= XXXX =

XXXX may refer to:

== Arts and entertainment ==
- XXXX (album), by You Say Party! We Say Die!, 2009
- XXXX, or Fourecks, the Australia-inspired continent in Terry Pratchett's Discworld series
- XXXX, the main character in the 2004 film Layer Cake

== Food ==
- XXXX (beer), a brand name
  - XXXX Bitter
  - XXXX Gold
  - XXXX Summer Bright Lager
  - Mr Fourex, the beer's mascot

== Organisations ==
- XXXX Panzer Corps, a tank corps in the German Army during World War II
- XXXX Reserve Corps, a German military formation

== Sport ==
- XXXX Derby, rugby league
- XXXX Gold Beach Cricket

== Other uses ==
- XXXX syndrome, Tetrasomy X, a chromosomal disorder
- XXXX Island, temporary promotional name given to Pumpkin Island, a privately owned island in Australia

== See also ==
- 4X (disambiguation)
- X (disambiguation)
- XX (disambiguation)
- XXX (disambiguation)
