= Castlemaine Brewery, Newcastle =

Castlemaine Brewery
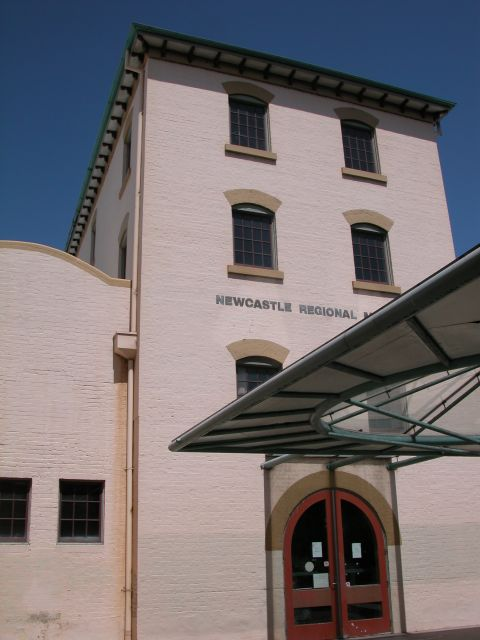

- Location within New South Wales Location within Australia
- 32.9256°S 151.7580°E
- Location: 787 Hunter Street, Newcastle West, New South Wales, Australia

History
- Built: 1874–1876

Site notes
- Architect: Oswald Lewis
- Owner: Newcastle City Council

New South Wales Heritage Register
- Official name: Castlemaine Brewery (former); Regional Museum
- Type: state heritage (built)
- Designated: 2 April 1999
- Reference no.: 312
- Type: Brewery
- Category: Manufacturing and Processing
- Builders: Messrs Laing and Wylie; supervising architect Mr G. H. Cox

Castlemaine Brewery is a heritage-listed former brewery and museum and now serviced apartments at 787 Hunter Street, Newcastle West, New South Wales, Australia. It was designed by Oswald Lewis and built from 1874 to 1876 by Laing and Wylie under supervising architect G. H. Cox. It was later used as the Pink Elephant Markets and as the Newcastle Museum before being redeveloped as the Quest Newcastle West serviced apartments.

== History ==
1856 – Arrival in Newcastle of the Wood family: John and Ann and three sons: John Jr., Joseph and Edward.

1856–1857 – Edward Fitzgerald established the Castlemaine Brewery at Castlemaine, Victoria.

1857 – John Wood Jr. was a miner with the A.A. Company in the D pit.

1859 – John Wood Jr. became publican of the Ship Inn Hotel.

1865 – Wood Brothers and Co. opened a Spirit and Bond Store in part of the spacious premises known as Bingle and Co.'s stores in Bolton Street, Newcastle

1868 – Wood Bros. accepted from Mr Fitzgerald the agency for the sale of Castlemaine Ale in Newcastle.

1874 – Fire destroyed the building in which the Wood Brothers' store was located.

1874 – Tenders were called for the construction of a new brewery to the designs of architect Oswald Lewis. Tender by Messrs. Laing and Wylie accepted.

1876 – The new brewery was opened and commenced operations. Water supply was obtained from a well on the site. The ale produced was of the highest quality produced by the most up-to-date methods.

1878 – Major extensions were made such that the brewery was said to be amongst the finest in Australia. The expansion was largely to cater for the greatly increased beer trade and the new complex is described as being 'replete with every convenience.'

1883 – The company name was changed from the Castlemaine Brewery and Malting Company Limited to the Castlemaine Brewery Maltings and Wine and Spirit Company Limited. This was changed again a few years later to the Australian Brewer and Wine and Spirit Limited.

1887 – A limited liability company was formed named The Castlemaine Brewery and Wood Bros. and Company, Newcastle, New South Wales Limited, which acquired the brewery business carried on in Newcastle and elsewhere under the name of Prendergast Wood and Co., and the wine and spirit business carried on at Newcastle, West Maitland and elsewhere under the name of Wood Bros and Co., together with the freehold land and brewery in Charlton Street (now Hunter Street) and the freehold land and store in Bolton Street, Newcastle. The first directors of the company were Joseph Wood, three Victorians: Edward Fitzgerald, Nicholas Fitzgerald and Malcolm Donald McEacharn and James Burns from Sydney.

Joseph Wood's brother John Wood Jr. died on 6 September 1887, and his shares passed to his only son, John Robert Wood (1865–1928), a fine cricketer who married the actress Essie Jenyns (1864–1920) in 1888 and took little interest in the company's operation.

1889 – Profit and turnover performance by the brewery in 1888–1890 was considered to be most satisfactory with dividend return to shareholders of 12 percent.

1890 – The Castlemaine Brewery purchases short-lived rival Great Northern Brewery on the south-western corner of Wood and Parry streets. There is little to indicate that Castlemaine used the Great Northern premises until 1897.

1893 – The Depression and strikes of the 1890s had a serious effect on the brewery business and the dividend payment was reduced to 7 percent.

1895 – The Depression deepened and was made worse by a drought which affected the previously strong country sales. Dividends, however, were held at 7 percent.

1897 – The dividend was reduced again to a level of 5 percent and the chairman during his annual report spoke of the troubles the company had faced, but which were now past: major modernisation of the equipment had been undertaken in the previous year and the brewery was now producing among the best beer in the Colony. Other improvements at the plant included asphalting the enclosure, repainting throughout, weather sheds to protect casks from sun damage, new cellars and vats.

The "evil" which had overtaken the company was a cessation of production for four months due to a bacterial growth in the brewery. During the complete renovations undertaken to counter this problem, brewing was transferred to the buildings purchased earlier from the Great Northern Brewery. Once the renovations were again completed brewing returned to Castlemaine and the Great Northern was used for only secondary purposes such as laboratories.

Partly as a result of the loss of trade during this period and due to increasing competition from Sydney, the dividend never rose above 4 percent during the remainder of the 1890s.

1898 – The renovations were completed at a total cost of £10,000 and the brewery was noted as being equipped with all the most modern appliances and capable of producing up to 800 to 900 hogsheads per week and up to 100 dozen bottled beer per day.

1899 – At the Annual General Meeting the directors complained that Tooth & Co and Tooheys from Sydney had plenty of money and were using it freely to secure business. This period saw a considerable effort to maintain the brewery's position in the market.

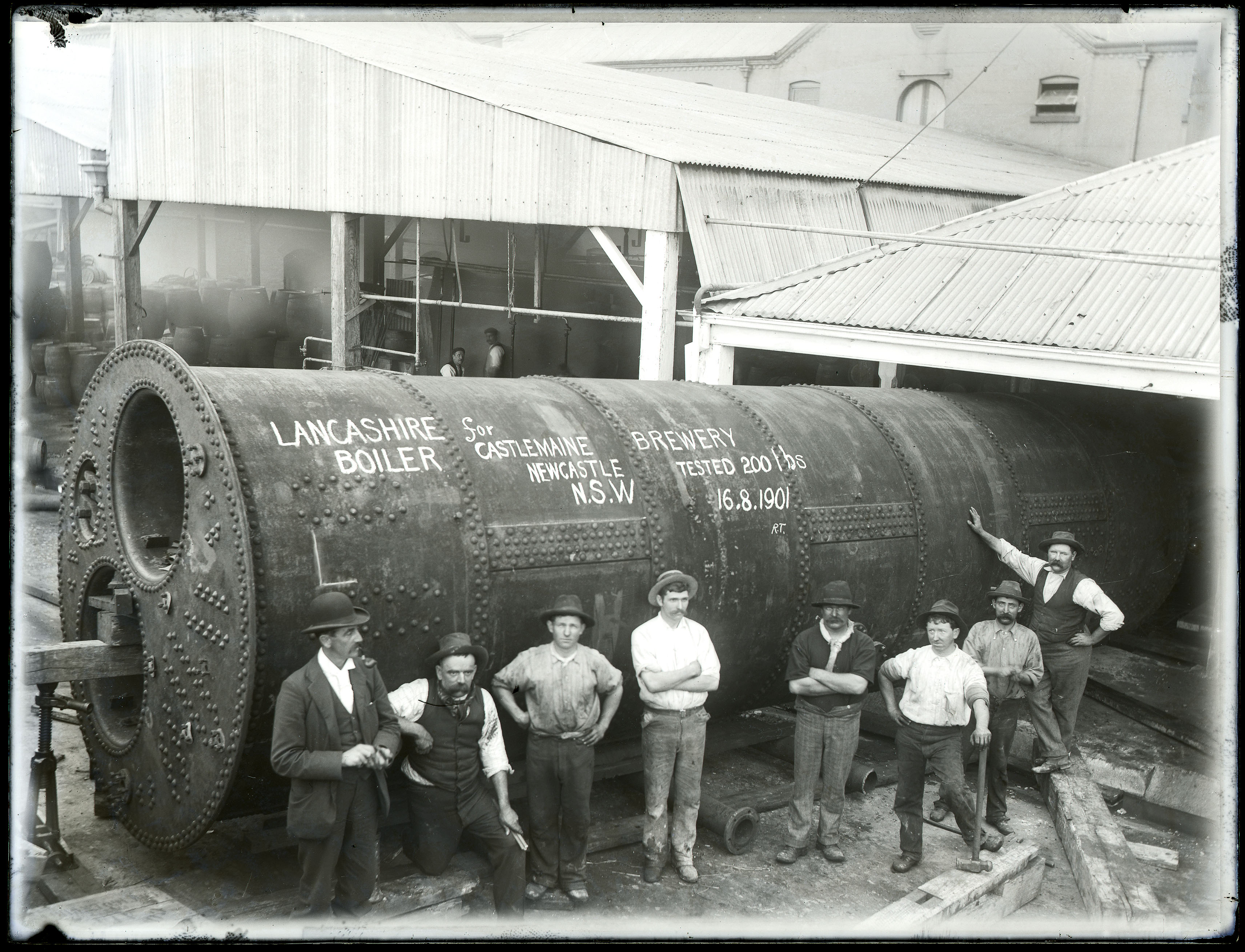
Boiler at Castlemaine Brewery, Newcastle, NSW, [17 August] 1901 by Ralph Snowball. Courtesy of the University Library's Cultural Collections.

1911 – The chairman, Mr. H. H. Long, noted that performance had been satisfactory given the adverse circumstances under which the brewery had been working during the previous twelve months.

Extensive alterations had been made which involved the installation of practically a new plant and a new system of brewing which necessitated important structural alterations and a great increase in engine, boiler and refrigeration plant. Under the guidance of Mr Pfrander, the head brewer, both the quality and quantity of the beer being produced had increased.

The alterations had been carried out while brewing continued which resulted in a staged alteration process. They had been undertaken under the superintendence of E. G. Castleden, architect, with the overall advice of Auguste de Bavay of Melbourne.

1912 – This year marked the twenty-fifth annual meeting of the Castlemaine Brewery and Wood Bros. and Company Newcastle NSW Limited. It was noted that the alterations of the previous year had been very successful with the company's beer now considered the most superior on the market. Partly as a result, beer output had increased by 40 percent and the spirit department had also expanded dramatically.

Further improvements costing almost £20,000 had been made which included about £6,000 expended in the building and equipping of a new bottling department, rendered necessary by the increased demand for the company's product. This reference is to the building facing Hunter Street designed by Castleden to house offices in the single-storey section and the bottling department in the two-storey portion to the rear.

1913 – The brewery's business continued to expand in both the beer and spirit departments as the new machinery continued in efficient production. Dividends of 5 percent were announced. The company had purchased the freehold on the Royal Exchange Hotel in Newcastle and arranged a long lease on the new Railway Hotel in Cessnock in an effort to popularise the company's products.

The new bottling plant had reached completion and other alterations were nearing completion. If the prospects for turnover were maintained at their anticipated levels, further additions were foreseen.

1921 – Tooth & Co entered into an agreement with the Castlemaine Brewery and Wood Bros. and Company Newcastle NSW Limited and subsequently acquired the company's brewing, wine and spirit business and properties. Prior to this Tooths had a small depot in Telford Street which was closed in late 1921.

Brewing continued on the site until mid-1931 when operations closed as a result of the Great Depression. Competition from other Sydney and Melbourne brewers and an apparent partiality for these "foreign" brews by the local people were given as reasons for the closure. The closure was not taken lightly by Newcastle as it had just lost its soap factory and biscuit works and the employment situation was not bright. More than 50 men were stood down and brewing ceased in Newcastle for nearly 40 years until Tooheys opened its Cardiff plant.

1938 – As business improved after the Depression, Tooth & Co decided to use the former brewery as a depot for the distribution of their products manufactured in Sydney. In order to implement this change of use, major alterations and additions were carried out to the designs of Pitt and Merewether, architects. The alterations involved the removal of all the brewing equipment, demolition of the power generating plant and erection of garages and buildings for the handling of packaged beer. This operation continued successfully with various additional buildings and alterations being required in the 1960s, until 1974.

1974 – Tooth & Co ceased operations on the site and transferred to a new depot in Nelson Road, Cardiff. The site was sold and became the Pink Elephant Markets.

1988 – Newcastle Museum opens in the former brewery after restoring the building.

2008 – Newcastle Museum closes at the brewery and moves to the former Honeysuckle Point Railway Workshops.

2014 – Development application approved for 47 units and associated car parking in the former brewery.

2017 – The Quest Newcastle West serviced apartments open in the former Castlemaine Brewery.

== Description ==
Original Brewery Building

Originally a four-storey tower, with symmetrical two-storey wings running to the east and west. The tower was roofed with galvanised iron with a central ventilating lantern running north–south with four accompanying ventilation dormers. Each floor had two windows on the northern face, with two on the east and west faces on the fourth floor. A verandah ran across the front of the tower, part of which was enclosed to form an office in 1878. The wings to the east and west terminated in brick gables that projected above the roof line.

In around 1880 the tower was enlarged and large openings created for vehicle access. Additional dormer windows and ventilation lantern was added. In 1911 the west wing was altered to allow the creation of a Gyle Room (Note: Gyle: a sample of unfermented wort set aside for later addition) with three gyle tanks to be added to the first floor. In 1912 the east wing was altered internally by raising the ground floor to match the later additions and a parapet was added to the northern wall. Two more Gyle tanks in the western wing required supportive alterations. In c. 1920 the dormers and ventilation lantern were removed from the roof of the tower. Pitt and Merewether designed extensive internal modifications to convert the buildings into a storage distribution depot in 1938, including drastic alterations to the northern ground floor to allow for new awnings and a loading dock.

Wood Street Brewery Building

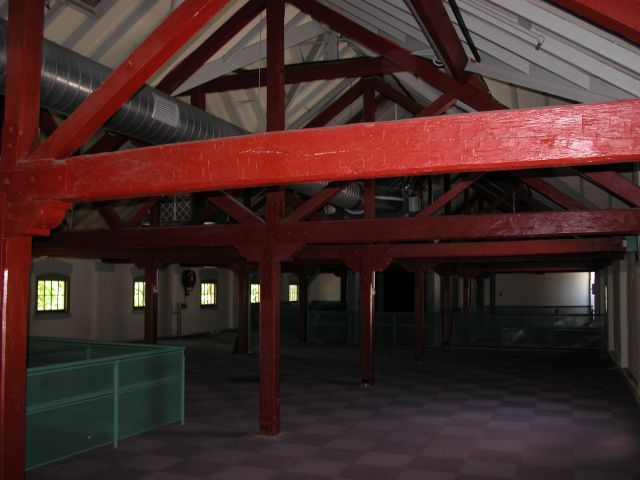
Loft

A two-storey building, with lofts, constructed in two stages between 1878 and 1885. The ground floor was concrete with a timber first floor, clad in brick with a galvanised iron roof. The Wood Street facade features two projecting gables and the roof profile creates an "M" shape, with central box gutter and fascia gutters. The 1878 section was built by George Yeomans as a malting room with overhead storage. In 1897 the ground floor was converted to refrigeration storage through the addition of cork insulation and loading access was created from the Hunter Street courtyard. Major internal alterations were undertaken in 1911, designed by E. G. Castleden, as a response to innovations in brewing technology. New skimming rooms were created on a raised floor in the centre of the 1878 building and an office and laboratory were created on the first floor. Prior to 1938 a cart dock was created on the eastern wall to load from the ground floor cellars. In 1938, when the new garage was built, the openings in the eastern wall were bricked up.

A 1911 illustration by E. G. Castleden indicates a room was attached to the south-east corner, also a shed, a boiler room, chimney stack and engine room to the south. These were demolished in 1938, along with workshops, harness room, bottle washing shed and earth closets along what was the eastern boundary.

Condenser Tower

No documentary evidence exists regarding the construction of the condenser tower, which first appears on a Department of Lands map in 1896, although it is believed to have been constructed in 1878. Castleden's drawing of 1911 describes the structure's purpose as bottle washing, however it has a shape traditionally associated with malting houses. The brick tower is square and topped with a pyramidal timber roof and ventilation lantern. Between 1911 and 1938 Castleden converted the tower from a malting house into a condenser tower. The pyramidal roof was removed and the masonry extended to three storeys. A refrigeration plant was located on the ground floor, with brine tanks on the first and second floors, supported by concreted and steel-framed barrel-vaults.

Bottle Store and Office

A two-storey construction, originally housing bottling equipment, with a single-storey section on Hunter Street for the office and reception area. The single-storey section has a triangular pediment over an entry portico, with rendered pilasters to add continuity to the Hunter Street facade. The two-storey section echoes the office, with the addition of a curved gable and a bullseye window common to the Federation style of the early 20th century.

The eastern facade was modified around 1914, with the addition of a bottling house. The original roof of the loading gate was extended to incorporate the new building. In 1938 Pitt and Merewether converted parts of the two-storey section into additional offices, a canteen and toilets.

Bottle House

An addition to the bottle store in 1914, it is thought to have been designed by Castleden, as the detailing matches the bottle store. In 1938 the hoist room, which had projected through the roof, was demolished. The southern parapet was lowered and finished with a triangulated brick gable. A substantial addition was constructed in 1960 with a plain brick face to Hunter Street and a saw-toothed roof.

Bottled Beer Store No. 2

The store was constructed before 1938 as a single-storey addition from the south-east corner of the bottle house. In the 1938 renovations the roof and southern parapet were lowered.

Receiving Platform

Constructed in 1938 on the southern wall of the bottle house, covered with a steel-framed cantilevered roof, to give access to the rear of the bottle store.

Vehicle Garage

A single-storey construction of steel-framing built between 1938 and 1939 as a lorry and car garage, with workshops and stores. Vehicle entry was via roller doors at the eastern end. Staff facilities were located on the southern side.

Courtyard Enclosure and Awning

In 1912 the former loading court was enclosed through the construction of brick walls. Originally sections were covered by verandahs, these were replaced in 1938–39 by a steel awning.

Covered Cask Platform

A free-standing raised platform with a galvanised iron roof supported by iron columns and trusses, built in 1938.

Oil Store

A small timber shed constructed in 1938 as an oil store and pump. In 1974 the shed was converted into a confectionery sales outlet.

Return Beer House

Removed from the main complex, a single-storey brick building with a galvanised iron roof for draining returned beer kegs was constructed in 1938.

Platform

A 25.6-metre (85-foot) platform was constructed on the southern boundary of the road in from Stewart Avenue.

== Heritage listing ==
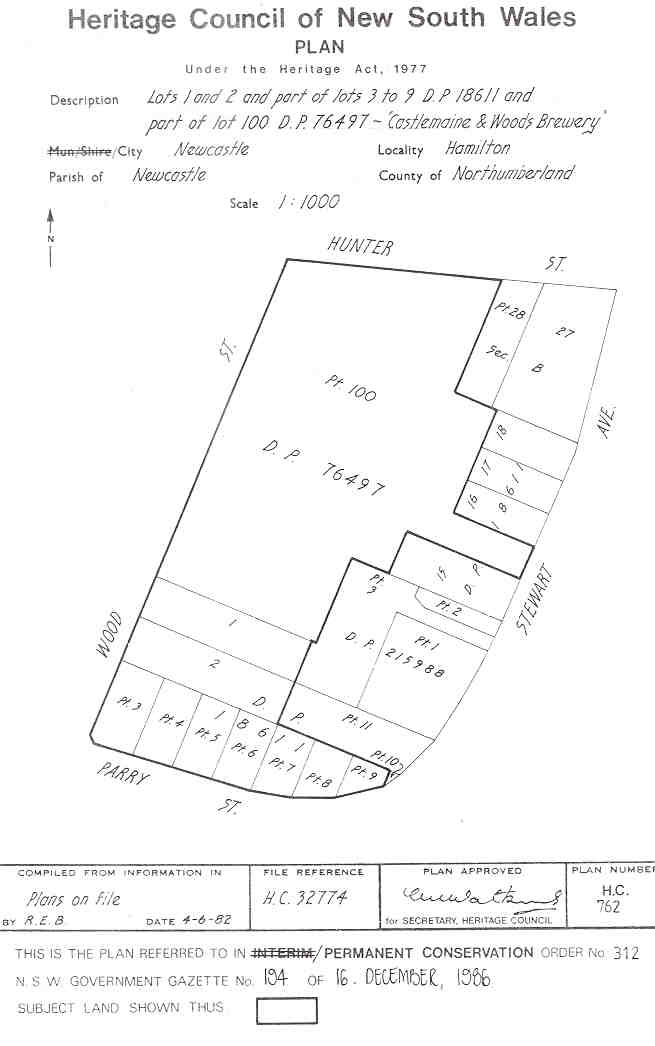
Heritage boundaries

The Castlemaine Brewery is of State Significance as a Newcastle landmark. Additionally, the item is unusual in the architectural sensitivity used during subsequent stages of construction, resulting in a significant industrial streetscape. The original brewery was constructed in 1874, with substantial additions being constructed in 1878 and between 1911 and 1914.

Castlemaine Brewery was listed on the New South Wales State Heritage Register on 2 April 1999 having satisfied the following criteria.

The place is important in demonstrating the course, or pattern, of cultural or natural history in New South Wales.

The Castlemaine brewery is historically significant as being indicative of the development of breweries in New South Wales. Its position is indicative of the prominence of brewing in Australian industrial development, and how, prior to the expansion of the transport system in Australia, each town had an independent brewery that was eventually bought out by a major brewing company and closed down as part of the gradual centralisation.

The place is important in demonstrating aesthetic characteristics and/or a high degree of creative or technical achievement in New South Wales.

The Castlemaine Brewery is of State significance as a set of 19th century buildings on a scale, massing and with a continuity of design that has a significant visual and landscape quality, particularly when viewed from Hunter or Wood Streets. The Brewery is an example of strong, but simplistic industrial architecture of the 19th century and has been a major visual element and landmark in Newcastle's skyline since its erection. The additions to the Brewery in 1910–1914 and again in 1912–1914 were undertaken in a sympathetic manner rarely seen in industrial buildings.
