= Francis Fitzgerald (cricketer) =

Australian cricketer and barrister

Personal information
- Full name: Francis John Fitzgerald
- Born: 4 July 1864; St Kilda, Victoria, Australia
- Died: 24 February 1939 (aged 74); Chelsea, London, England
- Batting: Right-handed
- Bowling: Right-arm roundarm slow
- Relatives: Percy Fitzgerald (brother)

Domestic team information
- Years: Team
- 1890: Marylebone Cricket Club

Career statistics
Competition	First-class
Matches	1
Runs scored	3
Batting average	3.00
100s/50s	0/0
Top score	3
Balls bowled	15
Wickets	0
Bowling average	–
5 wickets in innings	–
10 wickets in match	–
Best bowling	–
Catches/stumpings	0/–
- Source: Cricinfo, 12 September 2021

Francis John Fitzgerald (4 July 1864 — 24 February 1939) was an Australian first-class cricketer and barrister.

Fitzgerald was the son of the Irishman Nicholas Fitzgerald, who had emigrated to Australia from Galway in the 1850s and founded the Castlemaine Brewery Company, in addition to being elected to the Victorian Legislative Council. His mother was Marianne O'Shanessy, daughter of John O'Shanassy who served as the Premier of Victoria on three occasions. Fitzgerald was born in Melbourne at St Kilda and was educated in England at St Mary's College, Oscott. From there he went to Ireland to study law at Trinity College Dublin. He played minor matches for Dublin University Cricket Club, the most notable of which came against the touring Gentlemen of Philadelphia in 1884 at College Park. He was dismissed twice in the match by Frank Brewster and John B. Thayer. While studying at Dublin he played two minor matches for Ireland on their 1883 tour of England.

After graduating from Trinity College, Fitzgerald settled in London and became a barrister. He made a single appearance in first-class cricket for the Marylebone Cricket Club (MCC) against Yorkshire at Lord's in 1890. Batting twice in the match, he was dismissed for 3 runs in the MCC first innings by Bobby Peel, while in their second innings he was dismissed without scoring by Lees Whitehead. Having been a former chairman of the Oxfordshire Appeal Tribunal, his legal career concluded with Fitzgerald as recorder of Newbury in Berkshire, a post he held from 1904 to 1935. Fitzgerald died at Chelsea in February 1939. He was married to Susan Georgina North, a descendant of former British Prime Minister Lord North. His brother, Percy, was also a first-class cricketer.
