= Tooheys Extra Dry =

- Manufacturer: Tooheys Brewery (Kirin)
- Country of origin: Australia
- Alcohol by volume: 4.3
- Style: Dry beer
- Website: http://www.tooheysextradry.com.au

Tooheys Extra Dry (TED) is a dry style Australian lager brewed by Lion in the Tooheys Brewery at Lidcombe, New South Wales, Australia. Lion has been owned by Japanese conglomerate Kirin Holdings Company Limited since 2009.

== See also ==
- Australian pub
- Beer in Australia
- List of breweries in Australia
