= EX =

EX, Ex or The Ex may refer to:

== Film and television ==
- Ex (2009 film), a comedy directed by Fausto Brizzi
- Ex (2010 film), a 2010 Hong Kong film starring Gillian Chung
- The Ex (1997 film), a Canadian thriller film by Mark L. Lester
- The Ex (2006 film), a comedy film
- "The Ex" (The Amazing World of Gumball), an episode of The Amazing World of Gumball
- The Ex, an episode of Matlock
- TV Asahi or EX, a TV station in Roppongi, Tokyo, Japan

== Music ==
- The Ex (band), a Dutch punk band
- eX (Ipecac Loop album), 1995
- EX (Trigger album), 2011–2012
- EX (Plastikman album), 2014
- "Ex" (Elvana Gjata, DJ Gimi-O and Bardhi song), 2022
- "Ex" (Kiana Ledé song), 2018
- "Ex" (Ty Dolla Sign song), 2017
- "Ex" (Irama song), 2025
- "The Ex" (song), a 2003 song by Billy Talent
- "Ex", a song by Stray Kids from 2020 album Go Live

== Computing ==
- ex (text editor), for UNIX
- ex (typography), a unit of distance
- EX, the execute instruction on the System/360 and the IBM 7030

== Mathematics ==
- Expected value or E(X)
- EX (calculator key), to enter powers of 10
- Extension (simplicial set), or Ex functor

== Other sciences ==
- Extinct or EX, a conservation status
- ex, an author citation abbreviation in botany

== Other uses ==
- The Ex (target), a mannequin gun target
- EX postcode area, around Exeter, England
- Canadian National Exhibition or The Ex
- Endurocross or EX, a motorcycling discipline
- Sigma Chi, a North American collegiate fraternity commonly abbreviated as ΣΧ by its abbreviation in the Greek alphabet
- Ex code, IEC60079 code for electrical equipment in hazardous areas
- Pokémon ex, a special, more powerful type of card in the Pokémon Trading Card Game

== See also ==
- Relationship breakup
- X (disambiguation)
- The X (disambiguation)
- X mark
