= Castlemaine Perkins =

Brewery in Brisbane, Queensland, Australia

Coordinates: 27.4682°S 153.0057°E

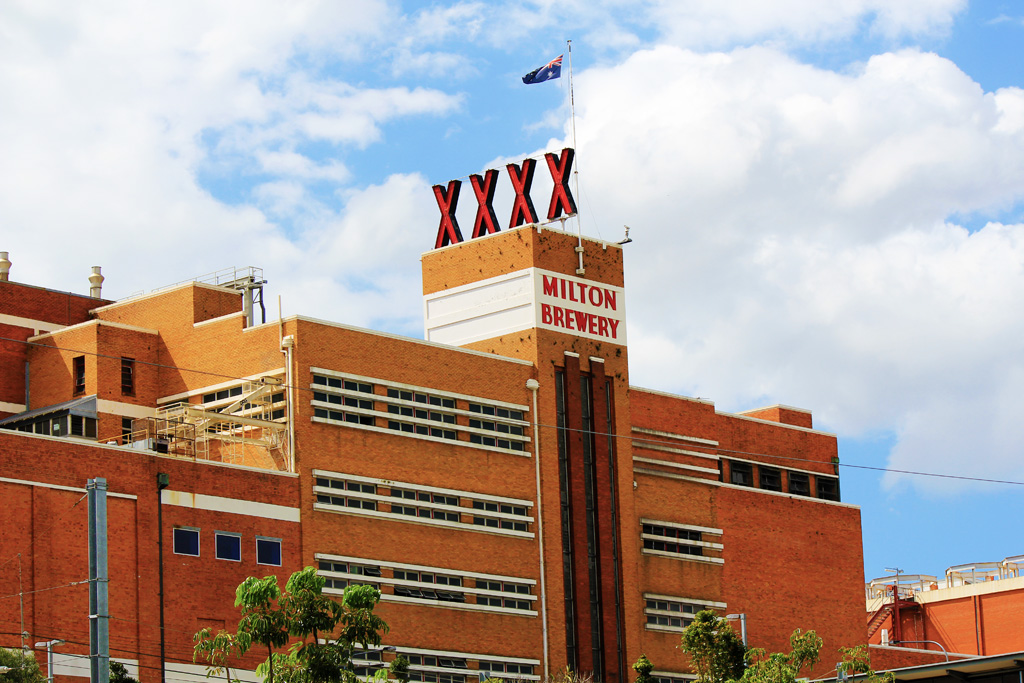
- Castlemaine Perkins Brewery in Brisbane, Australia
- Company type: Wholly Owned Entity
- Industry: Beverages
- Founded: 1878; 148 years ago
- Headquarters: Brisbane, Queensland, Australia
- Products: Beers and lagers
- Parent: Lion

Castlemaine Perkins is a brewery at 185 Milton Road, Milton, Brisbane, Queensland, Australia. It is a wholly owned entity of the Japanese-controlled Lion company. Operations began in 1878 and continue today. Castlemaine Perkins is the home of the XXXX beer brand.

== History ==
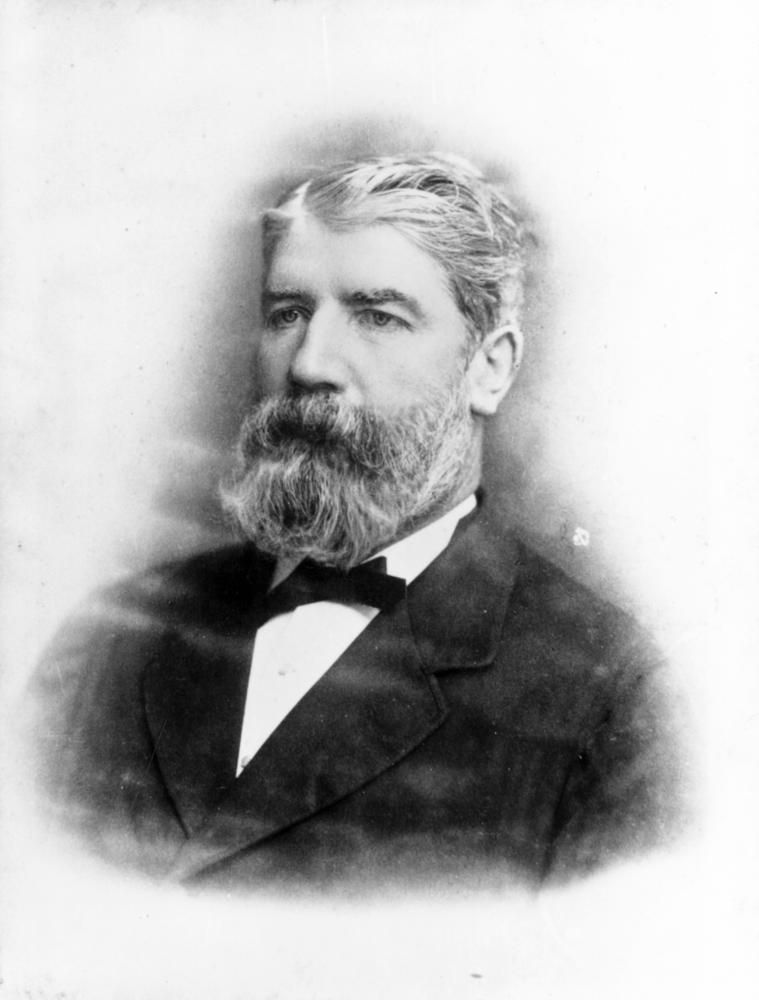
Brewer and politician Patrick Perkins, 1879

In 1877, brothers Nicholas Fitzgerald and Edward Fitzgerald partnered with a Brisbane commercial firm to buy the site of a failing distillery and establish a brewery, named for the Fitzgeralds' existing Castlemaine Brewery. They began to brew beer there in the following year and the brewery continues production to this day. The first beverage was called XXX Sparkling Ale.

In 1866, Patrick Perkins started the Perkins Brewery in Toowoomba. In 1872, he later extended his operations to Brisbane with the purchase of the City Brewery in 1872.

The company restricted its operations entirely to brewing by 1916. XXXX was introduced with new advertising campaign in 1924 after the brewery employed German brewer, Alhois William Leitner. The advertising included a depiction of a little man wearing a suit with a smile, a wink and a boater hat. The so-called 'Fourex Man' soon became one of the most recognised symbols in Queensland.

In 1928 (long after the death of Patrick Perkins in 1901), the Perkins brewing company was bought by the Castlemaine Brewery with new company being known as Castlemaine Perkins Limited.

In March 1980, Castlemaine Perkins merged with Tooheys to form Castlemaine Tooheys. Bond Corporation purchased Castlemaine Tooheys in 1985. Castlemaine Tooheys was acquired in 1992 by Lion Nathan.

== Building ==
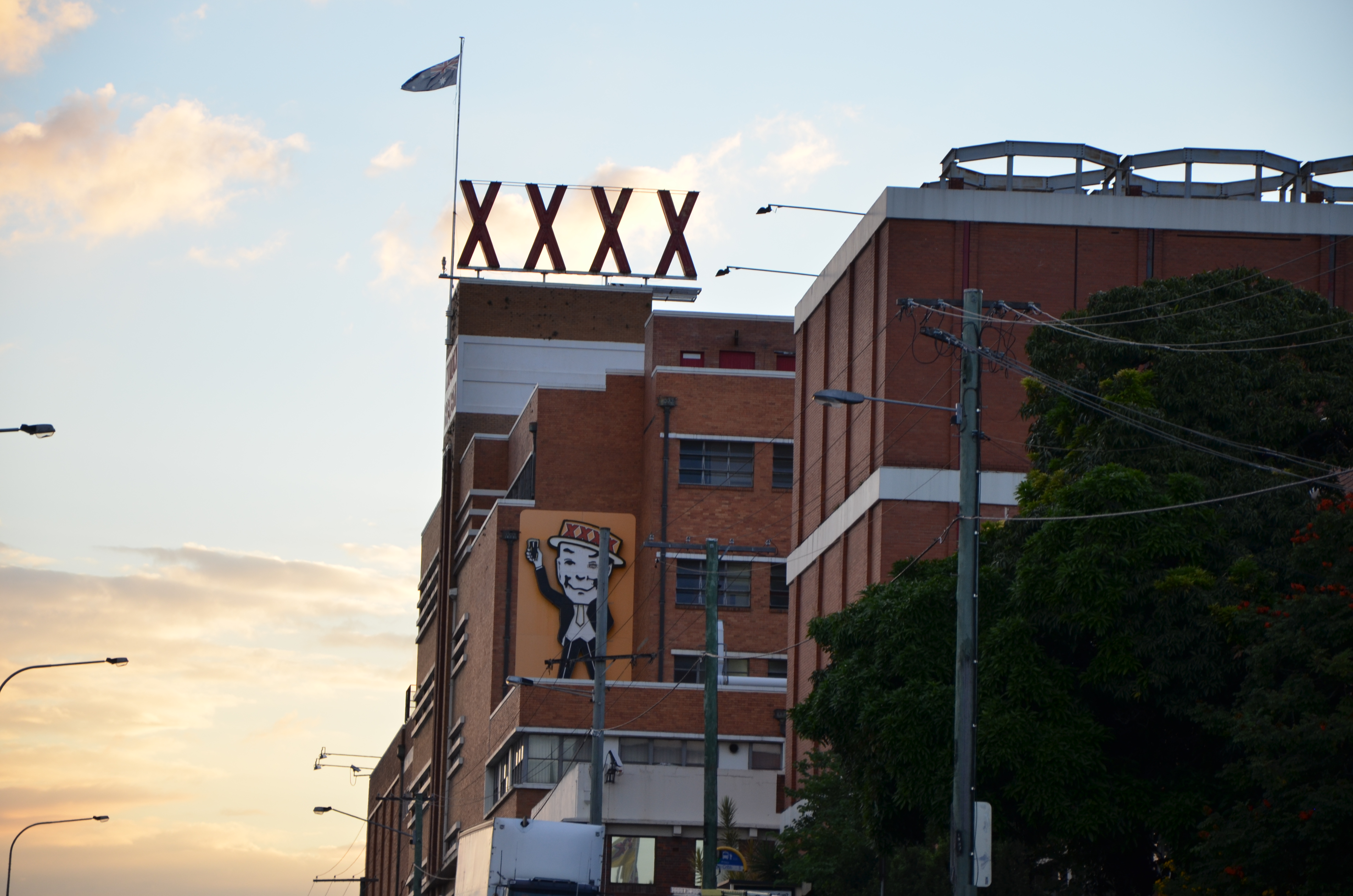
XXXX Brewery, Milton, Brisbane, Australia

The large, brick brewery is located on Milton Road opposite the Milton railway station, and is a prominent landmark visible in the surrounding suburbs. In particular the XXXX red neon sign is mounted on the top of the building. The side of the building also a neon XXXX man on the side (visible on Milton Road when travelling out of the city).

The brewery building, Milton Railway Station and trains feature on almost all XXXX packaging directly below the XXXX logo. Over the years bottle labels have depicted steam, diesel and electric trains. Tours of the brewery are regularly run for groups.

== Awards ==
In 2009 as part of the Q150 celebrations, the XXXX Brewery was announced as one of the Q150 Icons of Queensland for its role as a "structure and engineering feat".

Castlemaine Perkins was inducted into the Queensland Business Leaders Hall of Fame in 2009, for its significant contribution to economic development in Queensland.

== Beverages ==
Castlemaine's signature beer, XXXX Bitter (despite its name a lager), was introduced in 1924. The XXXX had been used for a sparkling ale since 1878.
XXXX Gold is a mid-strength beer.

XXXX Summer Bright Lager is a 4.2% abv low carb pale lager.

== See also ==
- Australian pub
- Beer in Australia
- List of breweries in Australia
- XXXX Island
