= Castlemaine Brewery =

Australian brewery and brewing company

The Castlemaine Brewery was an Australian brewery and brewing company established in 1857 by Edward Fitzgerald. He was joined in the business by his brother Nicholas Fitzgerald in 1859, after which the firm spread rapidly, opening breweries in Melbourne, Newcastle, Sydney and Brisbane, along with smaller breweries at Daylesford and Newbridge. The breweries, though all originating from the same brothers, were either established or later floated as separate companies with distinct histories thereafter, even though the brothers retained a stake in them.

== Castlemaine ==
The first brewery founded by Fitzgerald was located in Castlemaine, Victoria in 1857. It was closed and the company wound up in 1925, at which time it was reportedly the oldest industry in the district, with many employees who had worked there for much of their careers.

== Melbourne ==
A Melbourne brewery was established in South Melbourne (now Southbank) by Nicholas Fitzgerald and a managing partner, James B. Perrins, in 1871. It was floated as the Castlemaine Brewery Company (Melbourne) in 1885. It amalgamated with five other breweries to form Carlton and United Breweries in 1907, at which time the brewery was closed. Several of the historic buildings remain today.

== Queensland ==
In 1878, the Fitzgerald brothers partnered with the Brisbane business and shipping firm Quinlan & Co to form a new company, Fitzgerald, Quinlan & Co., for the purposes of opening a brewery in the Brisbane suburb of Milton. The new firm redeveloped the former Queensland Distillery into a new brewery. In 1887, The Castlemaine Brewery and Quinlan, Gray & Co. Brisbane Ltd was formed to acquire the assets of Fitzgerald, Quinlan & Co. and Quinlan, Gray & Co (the renamed Quinlan & Co). The company purchased competitor Perkins & Co Ltd in 1928, becoming Castlemaine Perkins.

== Newcastle ==
In 1874, Edward Fitzgerald and his partner in the Sydney brewery, Robert Prendergast, partnered with the Newcastle firm of Wood Bros. to build a new brewery there, which was completed the following year. It was operated by the partnership of Prendergast, Wood & Co. from 1886. In 1887, a new public company was formed to acquire the interests of the brewery, Castlemaine Brewery and Wood Brothers and Co., Newcastle, Limited. It was acquired by Tooth & Co in 1921, and continued as a Tooth & Co brewery until its closure in 1931 during the Great Depression.

== Sydney ==
In 1869, Edward Fitzgerald and partner Robert Prendergast built a brewery in Hay Street, Sydney, near Darling Harbour. The brewery was floated as the public Castlemaine Brewery and Malting Company in 1881 and reconstituted as the Castlemaine Brewing, Malting, Wine and Spirit Company Ltd. in 1885. In 1890, the company purchased the Australian Brewery and renamed itself the Australian Brewery and Wine and Spirit Co., Limited. The Castlemaine Brewery was closed after the sale and was demolished in 1905.
