= XXXX Gold =

Australian lager

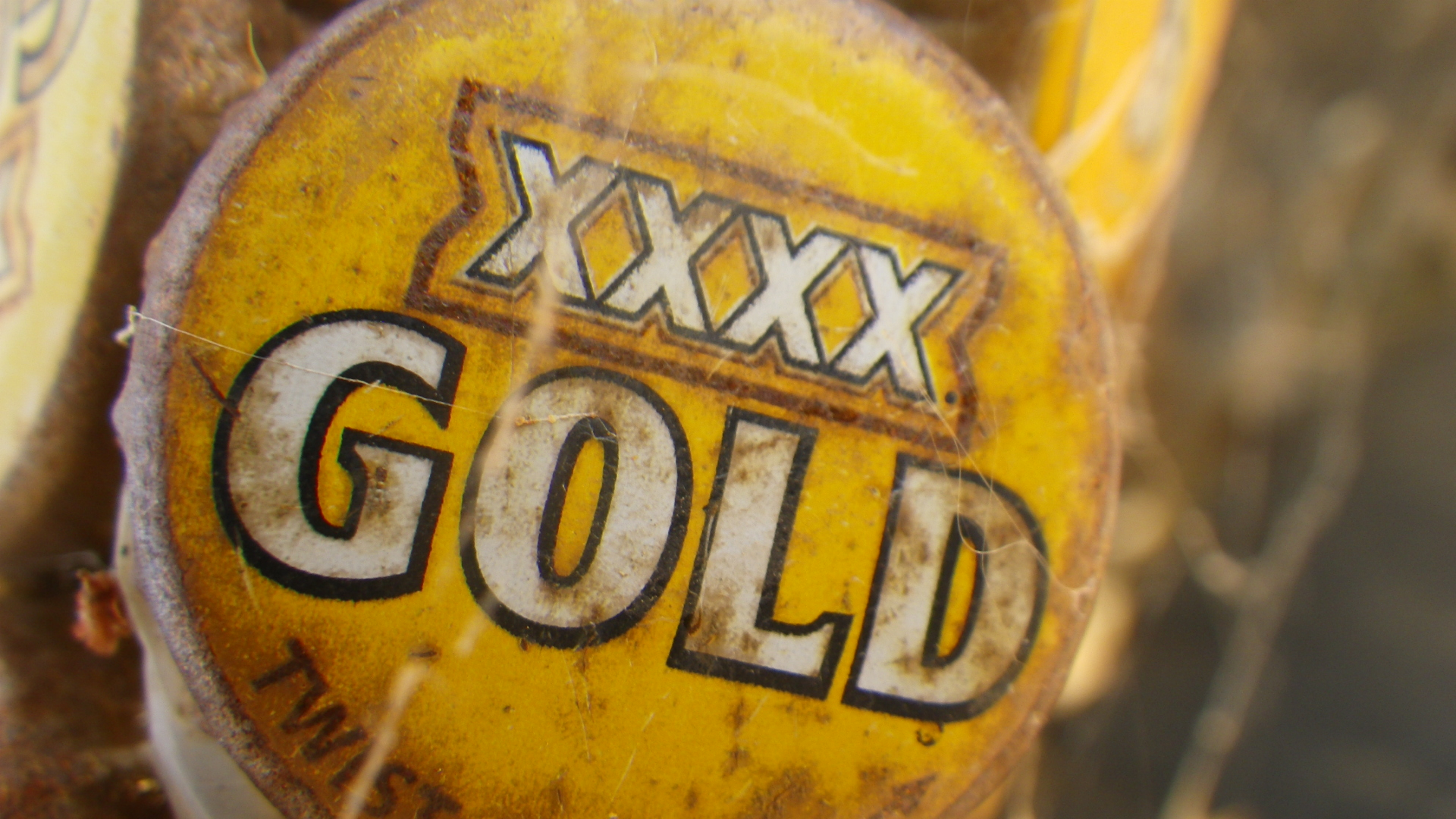
- XXXX Gold bottle cap
- Manufacturer: Castlemaine Perkins
- Introduced: 1991; 35 years ago
- Alcohol by volume: 3.5
- Style: a mid-strength Australian lager which is also a lower-carb beer.

XXXX Gold is a mid-strength lager from Australia manufactured in the state of Queensland, Australia, by Castlemaine Perkins. It is one of Australia's most popular beers, and is part of the XXXX beer brand. XXXX Gold is also produced in the Boag's Brewery in Launceston, Tasmania. XXXX Gold is a sponsor of the Queensland Bulls and the Queensland, South Australian, Australian Capital Territory and Northern Territory Cricket Associations. XXXX Gold previously sponsored the Australian V8 Supercars Championship Series from 2008 to 2011, as well as the Professional Bull Riders' (PBR) Australian branch. XXXX Gold has sponsored the Brisbane Lions since 2017 (shorts sponsor 2017–2018), and it remains one of the few active XXXX sponsorships.

== History ==
Victoria Bitter has held the highest market share of all beer sold in Australia for more than two decades. However, in 2012, this mantle passed to the Lion Nathan's Queensland XXXX Gold. Lion Nathan passed the mantle back to Victoria Bitter in 2013. In March 2012, XXXX GOLD obtained a three-year lease on the 6-hectare (15-acre) Pumpkin Island on the Southern Great Barrier Reef, which they turned into XXXX Island to use in advertising and promotional events. XXXX sponsored the XXXX Gold Beach Cricket Tri-Nations series, which involved famous cricket players from Australia, England and the West Indies such as Allan Border, Graham Gooch, Courtney Walsh and Sir Viv Richards.

== See also ==
- Australian pub
- Beer in Australia
- List of breweries in Australia
