= 4X (disambiguation) =

4X is a genre of computer strategy games.

4X may also refer to:

- Sogitec 4X, an audio processor created at IRCAM
- 4x CD-ROM drive, a speed of CD-ROM drive
- LG Optimus 4X HD, an Android smartphone
- NWFB Route 4X, a bus route in Hong Kong
- 4X, the production code for the 1977 Doctor Who serial Image of the Fendahl
- Quad scull or quadruple scull in rowing

== See also ==
- XXXX (disambiguation)
- Forex, or Foreign exchange market
- Castlemaine XXXX, an Australian beer brand
- Four-cross, a style of mountain bike racing
- Fourcross, a style of four-wheel downhill racing
- X4 (disambiguation)
