= Excess =

Excess may refer to:

== Music ==
- Excess (album), by Coma, 2010
- "Excess", a song by Astral Swans from Strange Prison, 2018
- "Excess", a song by Stewart Copeland from Klark Kent, 1980
- "Excess", a song by Tricky from Blowback, 2001
- "Excess", a song by Vision of Disorder from Vision of Disorder, 1996

== Television ==
- "Excess", a 2005 episode of Station X
- Dwayne "Excess" Wilson, a fictional character in the episode "The Gang, a Guy and a Bakery" of USA High

== Other uses ==
- Angle excess, in spherical trigonometry
- Excess insurance, a type of liability insurance
- Excess, in chemistry, a reagent that is not the limiting reagent

== See also ==
- Excess-K, or offset binary, in computing
- XS (disambiguation)
