= XX =

XX or xx most often refers to:

- 20 (number), Roman numeral XX

XX or xx may also refer to:

== Genetics ==
- An organism with two X chromosomes, in the XY sex-determination system (of humans, as well as some other animals and some plants) and the XO sex-determination system (of some animals):
  - Usually female, producing ova gametes that fuse with the male gamete during sexual reproduction
  - XX male syndrome (AKA de la Chapelle syndrome), a rare congenital intersex condition

== Arts and media ==
=== Music ===
==== Bands ====
- The xx, an English indie rock band
- X_______X (band), an American no wave band

==== Albums ====
- Toto XX, by Toto, 1998
- XX (Mushroomhead album), 2001
- xx (The xx album), 2009
- XX (Great Big Sea album), 2012
- XX – Two Decades of Love Metal, by HIM, a 2012 compilation album
- XX (O.A.R. album), 2016
- XX (Mino album), 2018
- XX (Note-oriety album), 2018
- [+ +], a 2018 EP by Loona, repackaged as [X X] or [× ×] in 2019
- XX (Brian Culbertson album), 2020
- XX (Il Divo album), 2024
- XX (Fally Ipupa album), 2026

==== Songs ====
- "xx", from Expectations (Hayley Kiyoko album), 2018
- "XX", from Ferxxo (Vol 1: M.O.R) by Feid, 2020

=== Other uses in arts and media ===
- XX (film), a 2017 anthology horror movie
- "XX" (CSI), a 2004 episode (S4 E17 / #86) of CSI: Crime Scene Investigation
- XX (web series), a 2020 South Korean online television drama
- XX (organization), a fictional organisation in the XIII comics (adapted into a video game, film, and TV series)
- XX (novel), 2020, by Rian Hughes
- Les XX, a group of twenty Belgian painters
- The Seeds of Death, a 1969 Doctor Who serial (production code XX)

== Military ==
- XX System or Double-Cross System, a British deception operation in the Second World War
- XX Bomber Command, an inactive US Air Force unit
- XX Corps (disambiguation)
- Legio XX Valeria Victrix, a legion of the Roman Empire

== Computing ==
- xx, to express exponentiation in the initial version of the FORTRAN programming language
- .xx ("dot ex ex"), a placeholder for an Internet country code top-level domain

== Other uses ==
- Dos Equis or Siglo XX, a brand of Mexican beer

== See also ==
- XX gonadal dysgenesis, a type of female hypogonadism resulting in non-functioning ovaries
- - Ex-ex-gay, a social movement
  - United States Exploring Expedition of 1838–1842 to the Pacific Ocean and surrounding lands
  - Ex Ex Lovers, a 2025 Philippine romantic comedy film
- 20 (disambiguation)
- Double Cross (disambiguation)
- X (disambiguation)
- XXX (disambiguation)
- XXXX (disambiguation)
