= The X =

The X may refer to:

== Television ==
- The X (TV series), a Canadian children's TV program aired in Canada on CBC Television
- The X's, an American animated TV series, seen on Nickelodeon
- WXSP-CD, a Grand Rapids, Michigan TV station branded as "The X"

== Radio ==
- KTHX-FM, also known as "The 'X' at 100.1 FM", a rock n' roll radio station in Reno, Nevada
- WXDX-FM, also known as "The 'X' at 105.9", a modern rock radio station in Pittsburgh, Pennsylvania
- WQXA-FM, also known as 105.7 "The 'X'", a modern rock radio station in Harrisburg, Pennsylvania
- WUHT, formerly WRAX, also known as "The 'X' at 100.5", a modern rock radio station in Birmingham, Alabama
- WXEG, also known as "103.9 The 'X'", a modern rock radio station in Dayton, Ohio
- WNFZ, also known as "94.3 the X", a modern rock radio station in Knoxville, Tennessee
- WHLI, former call sign branded as "90.3 "The X"", a college radio station in Allentown, Pennsylvania
- WZDA, formerly known as "103.9 The 'X'", a modern rock radio station in Dayton, Ohio
- KHTI, formerly KCXX, known as "The 'X' at 103.9 FM", a Southern California rock n' roll radio station
- KXZZ (FM), formerly known as "The 'X' at 100.1 FM", a rock n' roll radio station in Reno, Nevada

== Music ==
- The X (EP), a 2025 EP by Monsta X

== Other uses ==
- The X may refer to the École Polytechnique, also called X
- The X may refer to the Grand Casino Arena, an arena in Saint Paul, Minnesota formerly called Xcel Energy Center

== See also ==
- La X (disambiguation)
- X (disambiguation)
- The Ex (disambiguation)
