= X's =

X's may refer to:

- X's (album), an album by American band Cigarettes After Sex
- "X's" (song), a single by Dutch musician CMC$
- The X's, an American animated television series

== See also ==
- X (disambiguation)
- Xs (disambiguation)
