= ✕ =

✕ (Unicode character U+2715 ✕ MULTIPLICATION X) may be used as:

- An x mark, a mark used to for negation or indication
- A multiplication sign (more exactly, U+00D7 × MULTIPLICATION SIGN), a rotationally symmetric saltire
- The sign for cross product (more exactly, U+2A2F ⨯ VECTOR OR CROSS PRODUCT), a binary operation on two vectors in three-dimensional space
- A box-drawing character, more accurately represented by U+2573 ╳ BOX DRAWINGS LIGHT DIAGONAL CROSS

== See also ==
- Saltire (☓), a heraldic symbol
- U+26CC ⛌ CROSSING LANES, a character in the Miscellaneous Symbols Unicode block
- X (disambiguation)
