= X4 =

X4, X-4 or x4 may refer to:

- BMW X4, a German crossover automobile
- Sehol X4, a Chinese crossover automobile
- Honda X4, a Japanese motorcycle
- Moto X4, an Android Smartphone
- Mega Man X4, a video game
- Naish X4, a kitesurfing kite
- The Norteños street gang
- Northrop X-4 Bantam, an early jet age research aircraft
- A common name for petroleum ether
- A four-lane PCI Express slot
- Ruhrstahl X-4, a German World War II air-to-air guided missile
- Ultimate X4, a comic-book crossover in the Ultimate Marvel Universe
- X4 (New York City bus), an express bus route
- Stagecoach Gold bus route X4, a bus route in the United Kingdom
- X4 virus, a T-cell tropic HIV
- X-Men Origins: Wolverine, a 2009 film
- X-Men: Days of Future Past, a 2014 film
- WordPerfect X4, a version of word processing software
- X4: Foundations, a 2018 video game
- The airline code for SeaPort Airlines

== See also ==
- 4X (disambiguation)
