= XXXX (beer) =

Australian brand of beer

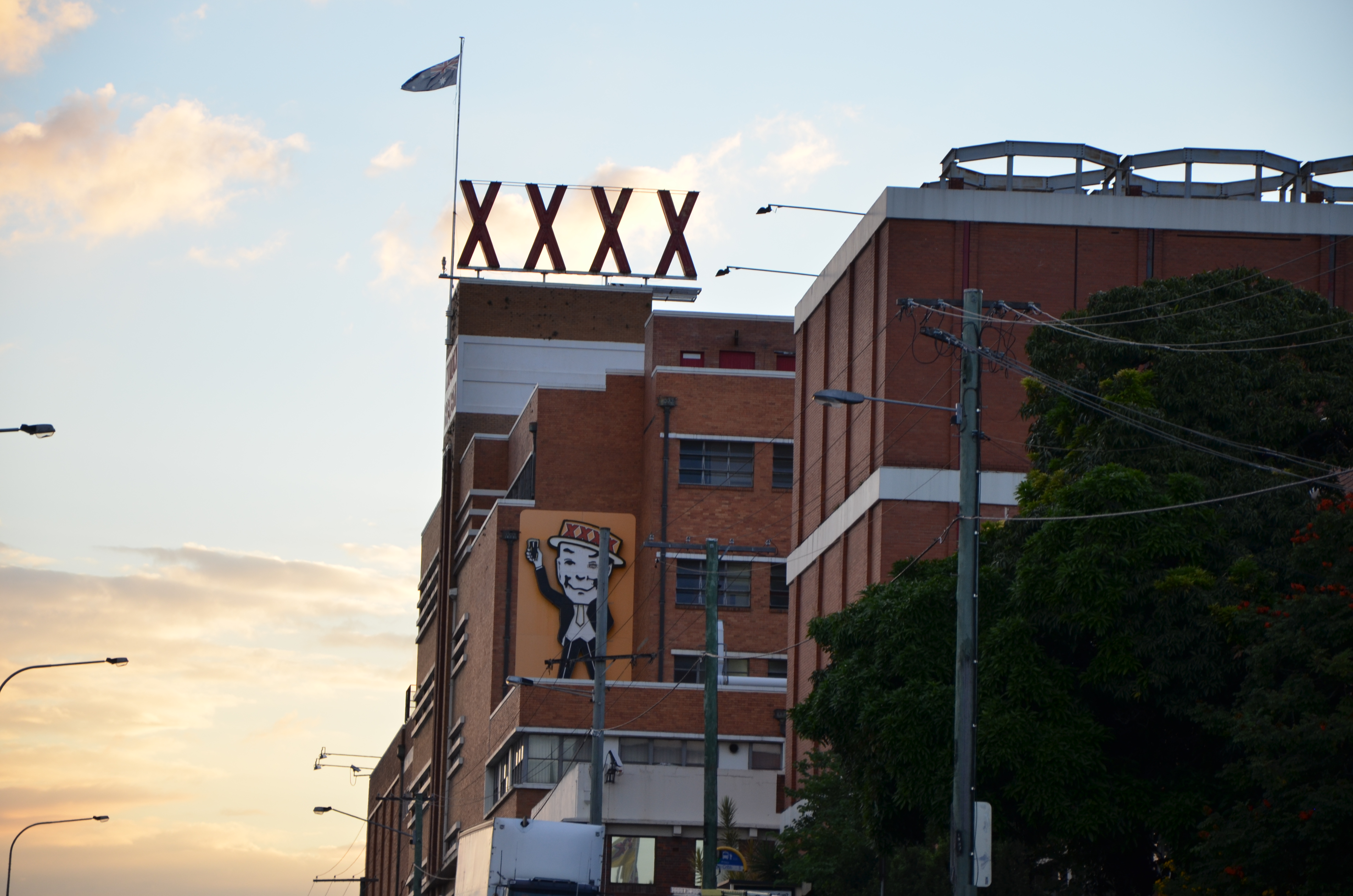
- XXXX Brewery, Milton, Queensland
- Location: Milton, Brisbane
- Opened: 1924

XXXX (pronounced four-ex) is a brand of Australian beer brewed in Milton, Brisbane, by Queensland brewers Castlemaine Perkins, now a division of the Japanese company Kirin. It enjoys wide popularity in the Australian state of Queensland, where it is commonly found on-tap in pubs and bars.

The XXXX brand was introduced by Castlemaine in 1924, and is a throwback to the long-standing tradition of using Xs to indicate the strength of an ale. The brand name is also built upon XXX Sparkling Ale introduced in 1878.

== Beers ==
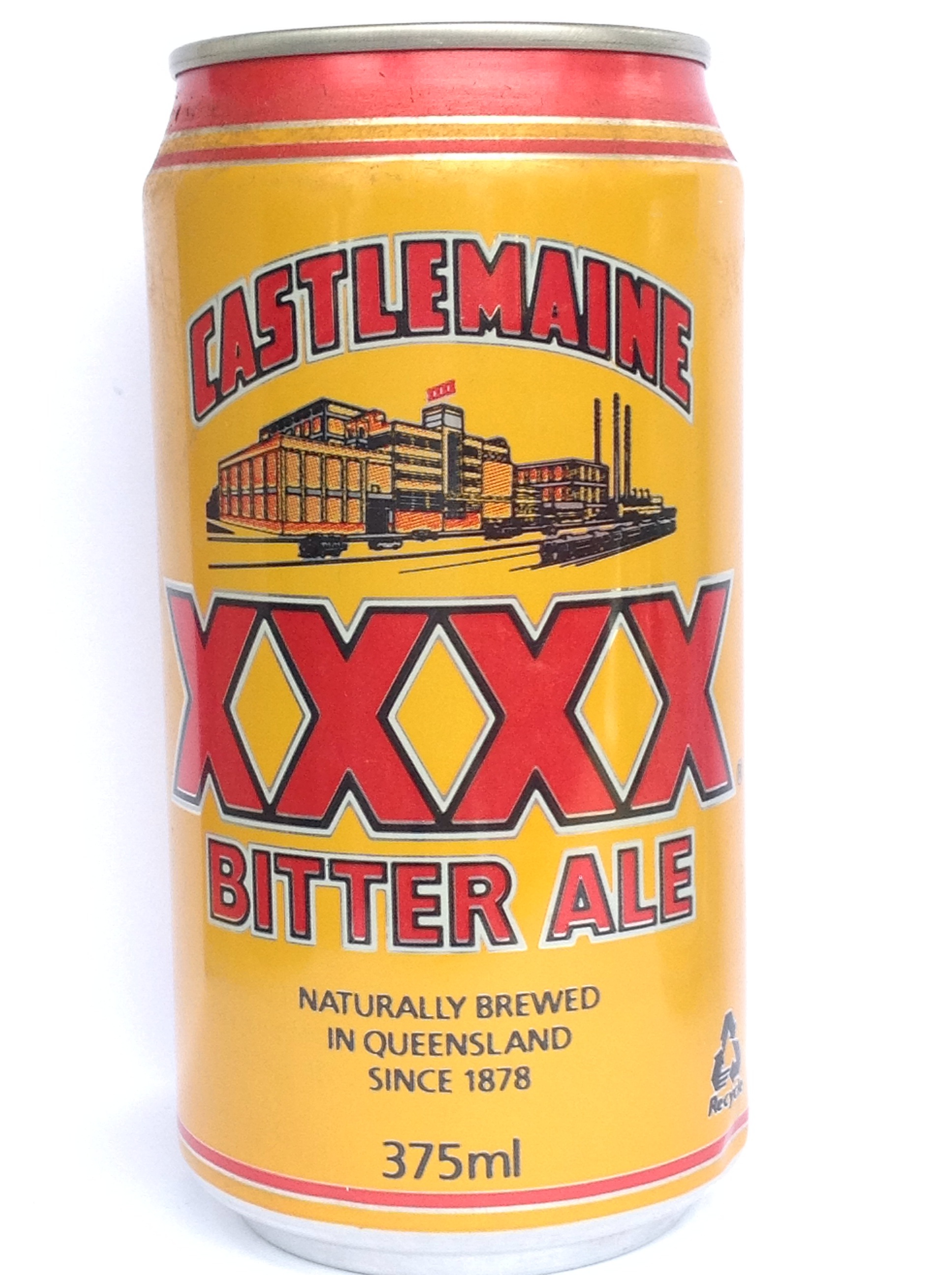
Can of XXXX Bitter Ale

Currently sold brands include:

- XXXX Bitter, a 4.4% ABV Australian lager marketed under the brand XXXX. When ordering in Queensland, it is often referred to as XXXX Heavy.
- XXXX Gold, a mid strength lager – 3.5% ABV. XXXX Gold is also a lower carb beer.
- XXXX Summer Bright Lager, a full strength 4.0% ABV low carb beer. Summer Bright is also available with lime or mango.
- XXXX Ultra, a zero carb lager at 3.8% ABV.
- XXXX Ginger, an alcoholic ginger beer at 3.5% ABV.

As well as these, previous beers that are no longer in mass production are occasionally available in small, limited releases at the XXXX Alehouse and Restaurant, located on the same site as the brewery. In the past, these have included:

- Thirsty Dog, a wheat beer popular in the 1990s.
- XXXX Draught, a less carbonated version of XXXX Bitter released in the 1970s, intended to replicate the unique taste of a beer from a wooden barrel.
- Carbine Stout, a stout brewed from 1915 to 2008, named after the racehorse Carbine from the 1890s.
- Castlemaine Best IPA, an India pale ale first brewed in 1918.
- In December 2019, the original XXX Sparkling Ale had a limited release in several bars across Brisbane's CBD, including at the Alehouse.

Other beers that are no longer available include:

- XXXX Light, a lower alcohol beer at 2.3% ABV.
- XXXX DL Lager, a lower carbohydrate beer which was available at 4.4% ABV.
- XXXX Gold Australian Pale Ale at 3.5% ABV.
- XXXX Dry at 4.2% ABV.
- XXXX Zero, an alcohol free lager at 0.0% ABV.

== History ==
In 1878, two brothers, Nicholas and Edward Fitzgerald, moved from Castlemaine, Victoria, to Brisbane, where they bought an old distillery on 13 September, which they called Castlemaine Brewing. They initially produced XXX Sparkling Ale, but in 1893, the brewers introduced a new beer which they called XXXX. The name "XXXX" itself refers to a traditional grading system for strong beer. In 1924, they launched XXXX Bitter together with cartoon character called Mr Fourex, claimed to be based on Paddy Fitzgerald, a former general manager of the brewery.

In 1928, Castlemaine Brewing bought the Perkins brewing company, established by politician and brewer Patrick Perkins, becoming Castlemaine Perkins.

The XXXX sign on the brewery was installed on top of the tower in the 1950s.

From the 1950s, a wider range of beers were produced, including XXXX Lite, Castlemaine 2.2 Bitter, and Castlemaine Special Dry. The company also began to use a smaller bottle to make it easier to hold in one hand, which is now known as the "stubby" and led to the development of the stubby holder.

In 1980, Castlemaine Perkins merged with Tooheys in 1980 to form Castlemaine Tooheys. In 1985, it was bought by Alan Bond's Bond Corp.

In 1988 the seven-metre high neon depiction of Mr Fourex was installed on the side of the brewery.

In 1990, a mid-strength lager XXXX Gold was introduced, which became the best-selling beer in Australia.

In 1992, Castlemaine Perkins was fully acquired by Lion Nathan.

In 1999, part of the old brewery was demolished to enable a new modern brewery to be built. In 2009, Summer Bright Lager was introduced.

In 2009, Lion Nathan was taken over by Japanese beverage conglomerate Kirin.

In March 2016, XXXX Bitter was reduced from 4.6% to 4.4% alcohol by volume (ABV).

== Distribution ==
XXXX was brewed under licence in the UK by InBev Ltd until 2009. It was commonly available in cans in British off licences and sometimes on tap in British pubs. At 3.7% ABV, the British brewed XXXX was somewhat weaker than most of the Australian variants. Castlemaine XXXX was withdrawn from the UK at the end of June 2009 when InBev's licensing agreement expired.

== Iconography, advertising and brand recognition ==
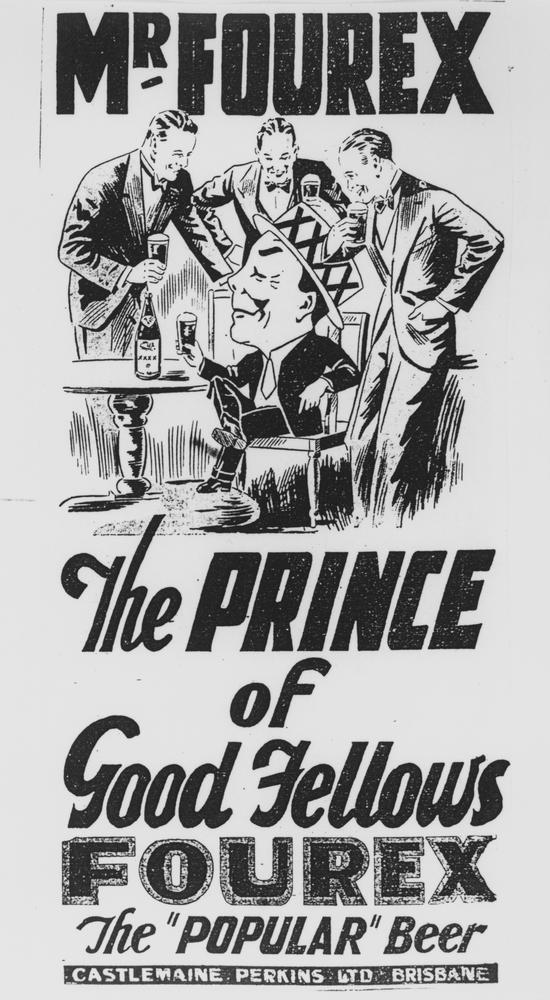
Mr Fourex in a 1920 advertisement

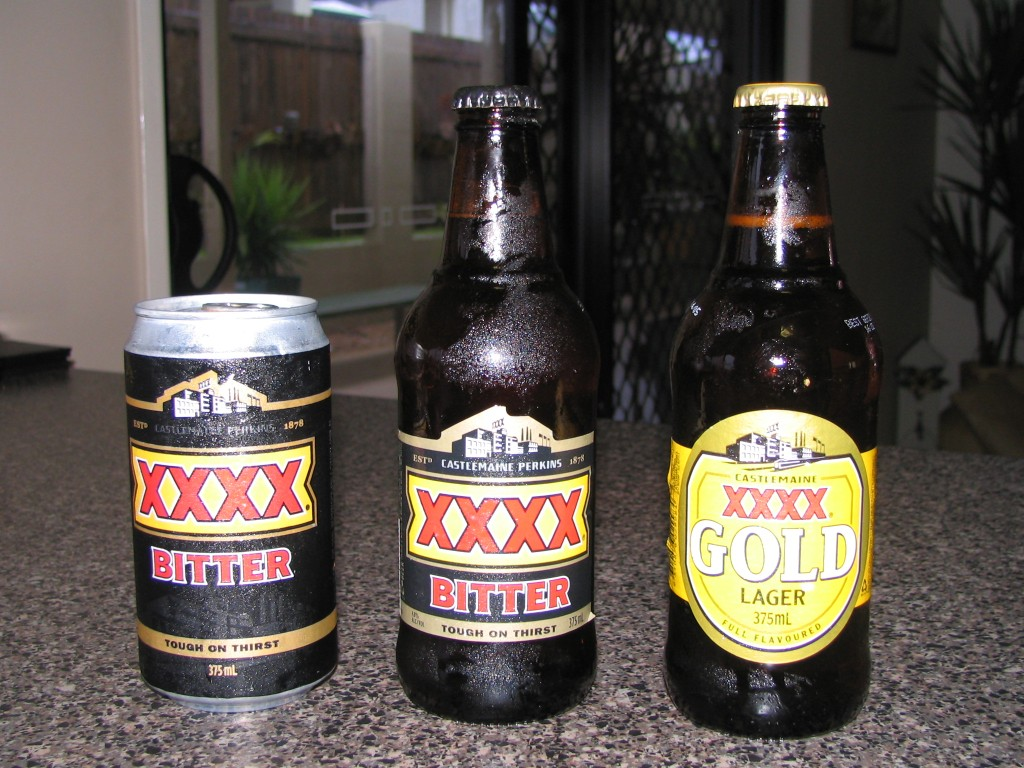
Canned and bottled versions of XXXX's two most popular beers

XXXX's mascot is Mr Fourex - a jovial cartoon man in a suit with a boater hat, who features on the City side of the Fourex Brewery at Milton. Conceived in 1924, he is said to be modelled after Paddy Fitzgerald, a former director of the company who started circa 1933. A second theory is that the cartoon is modelled on a well-known dwarf who sold newspapers in the inner city suburb of Fortitude Valley in the late 1920s. The true identity for the inspiration behind the cartoon remains a mystery.

A common nickname used by the military (Australian, passed along to their Allied guests) was "Barbed Wire," as the XXXX has the appearance of the fence product used in the outback.

The second major campaign was launched in the early 1980s in the North Queensland area after the then general manager of 'XXXX' Pat Holmboe heard of Clinton Howe, a locally well-known council road worker, being able to consume a high quantity of the beer in a short time (approx. 3L in 1 minute or 3/4 gal.). The company was forced to close the campaign within the first few days of T.V. advertising following government pressure.

An advertisement campaign from the 1980s and 1990s featured the tagline "Australians wouldn't give a XXXX for anything else."

Most beers under the XXXX label are sold in Australia as 375ml cans (tinnies), 375ml bottles (stubbies) and 750ml bottles (tallies or long necks), on tap (in most Queensland pubs but also to a lesser extent throughout the rest of Australia) and all bottles have twist top lids. Underneath the twist top lids there are trivia questions.

XXXX is still being served from wooden barrels at the Breakfast Creek Hotel in Newstead, Queensland. Whilst not cask-conditioned, as in the case of British real ale, the beer is unpasteurised and delivered by gravity.

In Terry Pratchett's Discworld series of fantasy novels, an Australian-like continent is named XXXX, pronounced "fourecks".

XXXX's labels generally feature a depiction of the Milton Brewery alongside the Ipswich railway line, presently with a Queensland Rail EMU in the foreground with the existing extensive railway fencing omitted. Prior labels had steam engines and diesels when those locomotives were more regularly seen in Brisbane.

=== Sports sponsorship campaigns ===
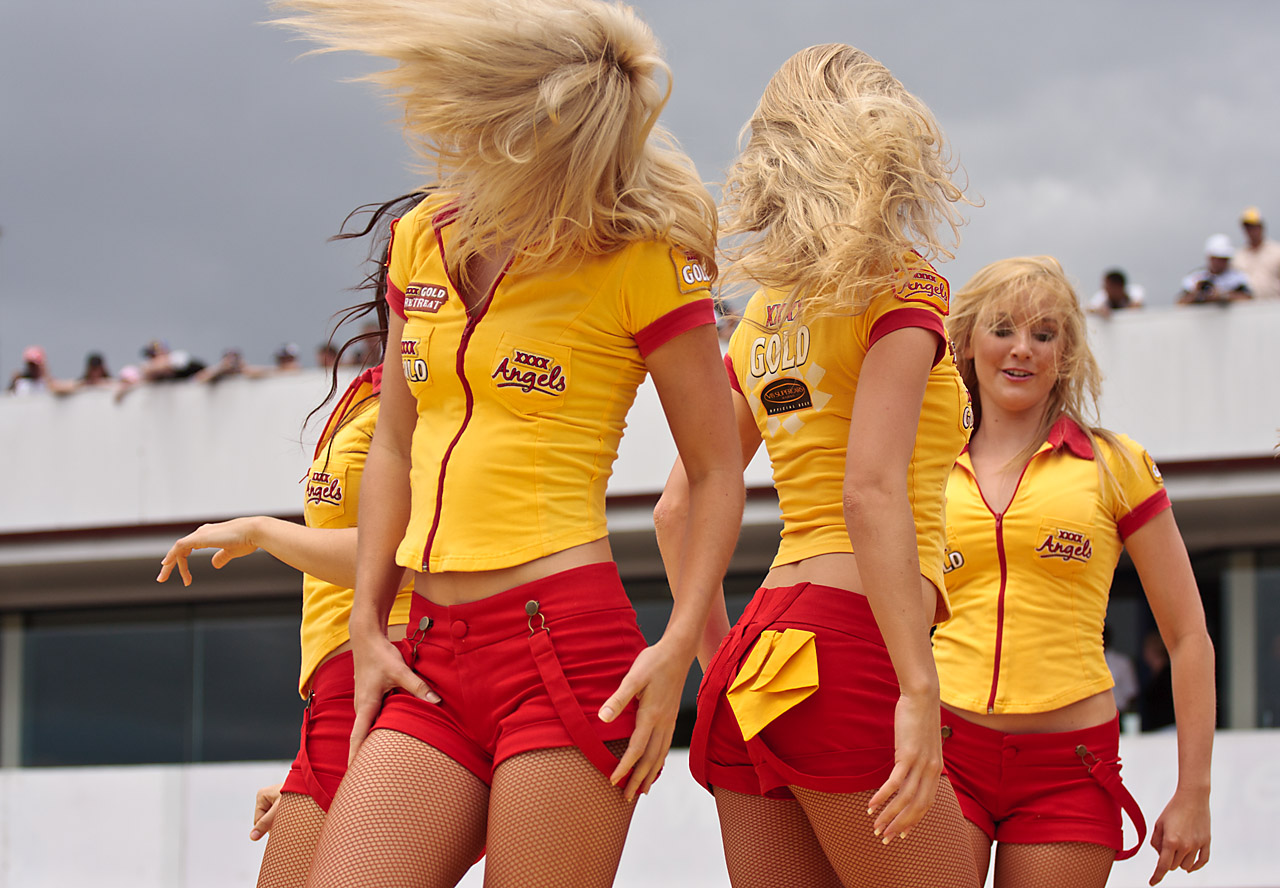
XXXX Angels at Eastern Creek Raceway, Sydney

XXXX is the major sponsor of the Queensland Maroons in the rugby league State of Origin series. XXXX Gold sponsors the Queensland Bulls and the QLD, SA, ACT and NT cricket associations. XXXX Gold also sponsors the Australian V8 Supercars Championship Series as well as the Professional Bull Riders' (PBR) Australian branch.

XXXX sponsored the XXXX Gold Beach Cricket Tri-Nations 2007 series. It involved cricketers from Australia such as Allan Border, England including Graham Gooch and West Indies including Courtney Walsh and Sir Viv Richards.

From 2012 to 2015, XXXX GOLD had a three-year lease on the 15-acre Pumpkin Island on the Southern Great Barrier Reef, which they turned into XXXX Island to use in advertising and promotional events.

== See also ==
- Australian pub
- Beer in Australia
- List of breweries in Australia
