= Swan (beer) =

Australian beer brand

- Manufacturer: Lion (Kirin)
- Introduced: 1908 by Swan Brewery
- Alcohol by volume: 4.0%
- Style: Australian lager

Swan is a beer brand owned by Lion Nathan. It was originally brewed by the Swan Brewery in Western Australia, but brewing was moved to South Australia in 2013 and to New South Wales in 2021. On 4 August 2022, it was announced that some of the brewing of Swan Draught, but not the Emu varieties, would be moved back to Western Australia, at the Little Creatures Brewery in Fremantle.

== Varieties ==
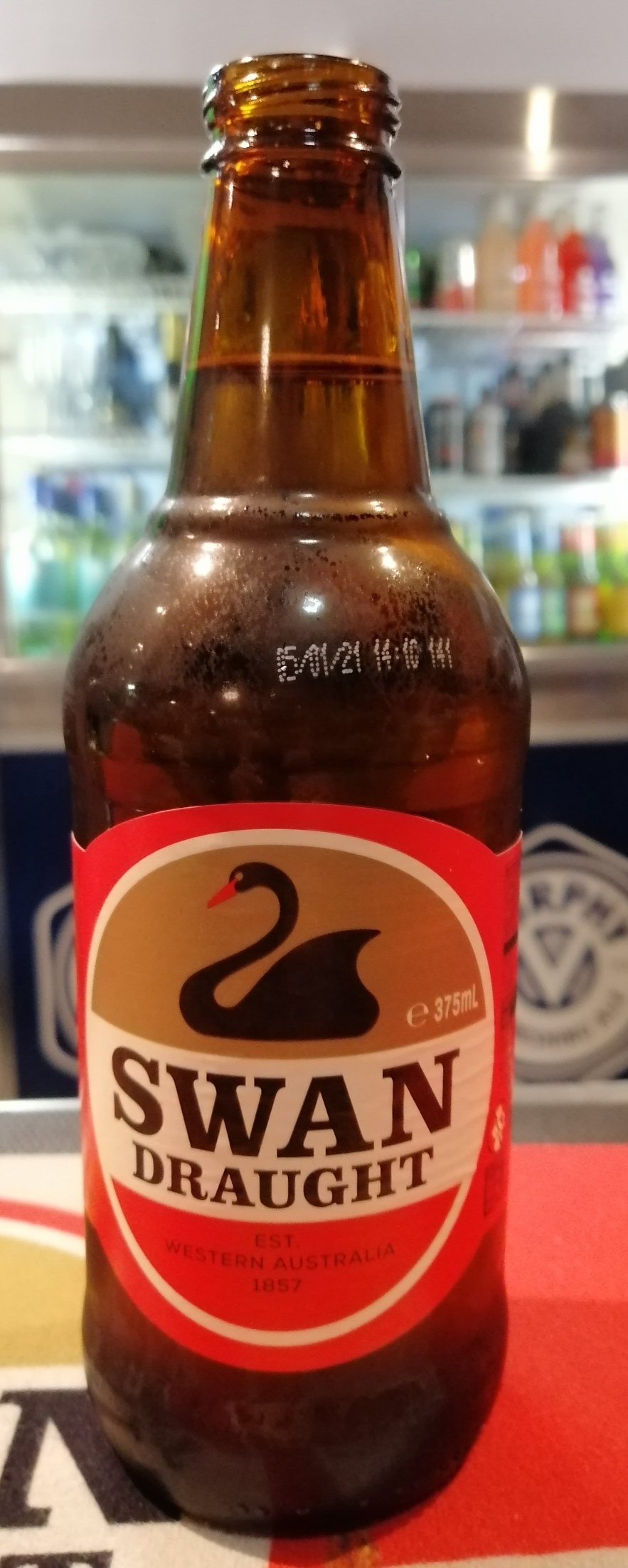
Swan Draught bottle (stubbie) 4.4% ABV

- Swan Draught is a mild Australian lager, with a medium bitter flavour and a full body (4.4% alc/vol). It has been in production since 1857.
- Swan Gold - a mid-strength lager, with a small head and a quiet bitter aroma (3.5% alc/vol). Production commenced in 1978. Ended 2003. Swan Gold was relaunched in 2023.
- Swan Stout - a unique stout naturally brewed using a centuries-old brewing style (7.4% alc/vol). Relaunched in 2025 as a 6.8%.
- Emu Bitter is a full-strength Australian lager (4% alc/vol). The recipe has not changed since it was first launched in 1923
- Emu Export is a medium bittered and full-bodied Australian lager (4.2% alc/vol), first launched in 1954.
- Emu Draft is a mid-strength lager (3.0% alc/vol). It has been in production since 1992

=== Former products ===
- Swan Export Lager - production commenced in 1933
- Swan Premium Lager - released following Australia II winning the America's Cup in 1983.
- Swan Dry - c. 1989
- Swan Special Light - a fully brewed low alcohol (0.9%) beer released in July 1984.
- Swan Skol
- Phipson's Australian Pilsner - produced by Swan Brewery for export in the late 1930s and continued into the 1940s
- Hannan's Lager
- 1857 Bitter - a mid-strength lager (3.5% alc/vol). Production commenced in March 1996.

== See also ==
- List of breweries in Australia
