= Beach Cricket Tri-Nations series =

Annual competition

The XXXX Gold Beach Cricket logo

The XXXX Gold Beach Cricket Tri-Nations series was a beach cricket competition created and sponsored by Australian beer brand XXXX. It was launched on 27 September 2006, and the event coincided with the 2006–07 Ashes series being played in Australia with the first series being played in January 2007.

The first series involved cricketing legends from Australia, England and West Indies. It was won by England, who beat Australia in the Grand Final on 4 February 2007. Due to the popularity to the initial series, a new 2008 series was held with teams from Australia, England and New Zealand competing, which also saw the addition of Glenelg Beach in Adelaide included in the schedule alongside the existing locations of Maroubra Beach in Sydney, Scarborough Beach in Perth and Coolangatta Beach in Gold Coast.

2009 saw the series reduced to just one location, Coolangatta Beach. The series did not return in 2010.

== Rules ==
The series incorporated rules that are a hybrid of outdoor cricket and that of indoor cricket. As with the regular game boundaries score 6 runs if hit over the perimeter, and 4 if the ball hits the ground before passing or touching the perimeter.

There are eight overs in an innings, with the final two overs declared "Captain's Choice" in which each side's captain is allowed to field the batsmen and bowlers of their own choosing. For the first six overs batsmen and bowlers are swapped out every two overs.

When a batsman is dismissed, he keeps batting – however, he loses runs. A score is decreased by 5 runs when the batsman has been dismissed by two-handed catch, and by 7 runs with a one-handed catch. It is possible to score into negative numbers.

A batsman cannot be dismissed LBW if he plays a shot.

The series uses a plastic drop-in pitch to allow the ball to bounce, and batting and bowling only take place facing one direction. The Coolangatta arena initially featured an open boundary along the surf, allowing fielding to be possible in the water; however this was later removed due to crowd control concerns.

== Competition results ==
=== 2007 series ===
Finals played in Maroubra, New South Wales, on Sunday, 4 February 2007:

- England v Australia – won by England

=== 2008 series ===
Leader board

Team	Played	Won	Lost	Points
New Zealand	11	7	4	17
England	10	5	5	13
Australia	9	3	6	6

Finals played in Coolangatta, Queensland, on Sunday, 20 January 2008:

- New Zealand 3/88 v England 6/63

=== 2009 series ===
Team	Played	Won	Lost	Bonus	Points
New Zealand	8	6	2	3	16
South Africa	7	3	4	2	8
Australia	9	3	6	0	6

== Records ==
Minimum of 8 overs.
Team

- Highest winning score; England 1/153 v Australia at Scarborough, 2008 (Round 1).
- Highest losing score; Australia 0/126 v England at Scarborough, 2008 (Round 1).
- Lowest winning score; West Indies v England ?/41 at Coolangatta, 2007 (Round 1).
- Lowest losing score; Australia v South Africa 6/22 at Coolangatta, 2009 (Round 2 Final).
- Most wins in a row; New Zealand 7 from 2008 (Round 3 Final) to 2009 (Round 1 Final).
- Most losses in a row; Australia 5 from 2007 (Round 3 Final) to 2008 (Round 2 - Game 1).

Individual

- Most runs (innings); Graeme Hick 81(57 & 24*) v Australia at Scarborough, 2008 (Round 1)
- Most runs (over); Graham Gooch 36 (6 6 6 6 6 6) v New Zealand at Coolangatta, 2008 (Round 4)

* ^{batted twice (Captains Choice)}

== Trophies ==
Winners of the round robin competition receive a beer glass, while the runners-up receive a can of XXXX Gold beer. Winners of the finals are presented with a beer glass mounted on a wooden stand. In 2009 the trophies were:

- Round 1 – Dennis Lillee Trophy
- Round 2 – Jeff Thomson Trophy
- Round 3 – McGrath Foundation Trophy

== Promotions & Marketing ==
For the 2008 series, XXXX was giving away free XXXX Gold Beach Cricket Aussie Team Shirts as part of sales of promotional cartons of XXXX GOLD. Television commercials were aired starring some of the Beach Cricket legends. Network Ten is the host broadcaster of the matches.

== Entertainment ==
Throughout the matches the players are miked up so both fans at the game and at home watching the televised match can hear the players talking. Also music is played throughout the day whilst the matches were being played.

When the players were fielding around the boundary, they take time out to sign autographs for fans situated around the boundary.

In between the matches there are performances on field, by the female cheerleading squad "XXXX Angels". Also XXXX promotional staff hand out giveaways including XXXX Gold bucket hats, beach cricket balls and other promo items.

== Controversy ==
XXXX's sponsorship of the series caused a number of controversies with Cricket Australia, which was sponsored by another beer brand, Victoria Bitter from Carlton & United Breweries.

The Gabba was forced to remove XXXX billboards promoting the series from the ground after the organisation threatened to take away the ground's rights to host future international matches. Cricket Australia claimed that XXXX's billboards were a form of ambush marketing.

Allan Border was also forced to resign as a national selector for taking part in the series against the wishes of Foster's.
