= X (disambiguation) =

X is the 24th letter of the English alphabet.

X may also refer to:

== Arts, entertainment, and media ==
=== Fictional entities ===
- X (Dark Horse Comics), a character and its namesake series
- X (Mega Man), protagonist of the Mega Man X video game series
- X (The X-Files), television series character
- Radio X, the fictional radio station broadcasting the Grand Theft Auto: San Andreas soundtrack
- X, symbol used on treasure maps in fiction to show the location of the hidden treasure
  - X Marks the Spot (disambiguation)
- X, a character from the fourth season of Battle for Dream Island, an animated web series
- X Parasite, element of the 2002 game Metroid Fusion

=== Film ===
- X (1963 film), subtitled The Man with the X-Ray Eyes, an American science fiction film
- X (1986 film), Norwegian drama directed by Oddvar Einarson
- X (1996 film), anime film directed by Rintaro, based on the X manga by CLAMP
- X (2022 film), American horror film directed by Ti West
- X the Unknown, 1956 British science fiction horror film
- X, alternate title for Malcolm X (1992 film), directed by Spike Lee
- X: Night of Vengeance, a 2011 thriller by Australian director Jon Hewitt
- X: Past Is Present, 2015 Indian anthology film
- X rating, designation for adult-only films

=== Literature ===
- X (Cage book), by avant garde composer John Cage
- X (magazine), quarterly review of literature and the arts
- X (manga), 1992 Japanese manga by CLAMP
- X (Grafton novel), 2015, by Sue Grafton
- X (young adult novel), 2015, by Ilyasah Shabazz and Kekla Magoon
- "X: A Fabulous Child's Story", 1972 short story and 1978 picture book by Lois Gould
- X: Or, Betty Shabazz v. The Nation, 2017 play by Marcus Gardley
- The 'X' Documents, 1974 collection of British reports on German opposition to Hitler based on meetings with Carl Friedrich Goerdeler
- 'X' Stands for Unknown, 1984 collection of science essays by Isaac Asimov

=== Music ===
==== Bands ====
- X (American band), punk band
- X (Australian band), punk band
- X Japan, Japanese metal band, originally named X from 1982 to 1992
- X:IN, multinational girl group based in South Korea

==== Albums ====
- X (Klaus Schulze album), 1978
- X (Gnags album), 1983
- X (INXS album), 1990
- X (K-Ci & JoJo album), 2000
- X (Def Leppard album), 2002
- X (Anna Vissi album), 2002
- X (Kristeen Young album), 2004
- X the album, a Christian compilation album series starting in 2004
- X (Liberty X album), 2005
- X (Intocable album), 2005
- X (Fourplay album), 2006
- X (Kylie Minogue album), 2007
- X (Trace Adkins album), 2008
- X (Spock's Beard album), 2010
- X (Royal Hunt album), 2010
- X (Roll Deep album), 2012
- X (The 69 Eyes album), 2012
- x (Chris Brown album), 2014
- X (Ed Sheeran album) (read as "Multiply"), 2014
- X (Agnez Mo album), 2017
- X (The Driver Era album), 2019
- X (Ken Carson album), 2022
- X (Stam1na album), 2023
- X (Lucki mixtape), 2015
- X (pH-1 mixtape), 2020
- X, a Philippine hip-hop album by Ex Battalion
- X (Nonpoint album), 2018
- X: The Godless Void and Other Stories, 2020, by ...And You Will Know Us by the Trail of Dead
- Ten (Sault album), (also styled X) 2022
- X, 2025 studio album by Maya Berović
  - X, 2024 extended play by Maya Berović

==== Operas ====
- X, The Life and Times of Malcolm X, 1986

==== Songs ====
- "X", by Miss Li
- "X" (21 Savage and Metro Boomin song)
- "X" (Chris Brown song)
- "X" (Jonas Brothers song)
- "X" (Liberty X song)
- "X" (Nicky Jam and J Balvin song)
- "X" (Poppy song)
- "X" (Xzibit song)
- "X" (Arca song)
- "X", from The Circle by B'z
- "X", from Neysluvara by Hatari
- "X", from Undeniable by Hellyeah
- "X", from Pain Is Love by Ja Rule featuring Missy Elliott and Tweet
- "X", from Future History by Jason Derulo
- "X", from Luv Is Rage 2 by Lil Uzi Vert
- "X", from the extended play The Code by Monsta X
- "X", from The Magic Position by Patrick Wolf
- "X", from Angels & Demons by Peter Andre
- "X", from Black Panther by ScHoolboy Q, 2 Chainz, Saudi, and Kendrick Lamar
- "X", from X by Stam1na
- "X", from Toxicity by System of a Down
- "X", from Blue Blood by X Japan
- "X", from In the Court of the Dragon by Trivium
- "X", from the album X by Ken Carson

==== Stations ====
- WXNY-FM, known as "La X 96.3", a Spanish radio station in New York City
- XETRA-FM/91.1 MHz, licensed to Tijuana, using the moniker "91X"
- Radio X (United Kingdom), British radio station which grew out of the former XFM

=== Roller coasters ===
- X2 (roller coaster), at Six Flags Magic Mountain, California, formerly known as X
- The Walking Dead: The Ride in Thorpe Park, England, formerly known as X

=== Television ===
- Kamen Rider X, Japanese series in the Kamen Rider franchise
- Ultraman X, 2015 Japanese tokusatsu series
- X (TV series), Japanese anime series based on the X manga by CLAMP
- The Ark, 1966 Doctor Who serial (production code X)

=== Video games ===
- X (1992 video game), a 3D game for the Nintendo Game Boy console
- X (video game series), a science fiction space simulator series by Egosoft
- X (Xbox show), an annual trade show hosted by Microsoft

=== World Wide Web ===
- XVideos, internet pornography-video sharing and viewing website
- X (social network), formerly "Twitter", known as X since 2023, an American social networking service

== Companies ==
- X Development, Google's in-house incubator established in 2010
- X Corp., the parent company of social network X
- X.com (bank), the predecessor of PayPal
- X.Org Foundation, non-profit corporation responsible for developing the X Window System
- United States Steel Corporation (stock symbol "X")

== Other organizations ==
- X (demo party), Dutch demoscene party which started in 1995
- Organization X, paramilitary, anti-communist, royalist organization in Greece, active during the Axis occupation and the Civil War
- X University, informal interim name of Toronto Metropolitan University, formerly Ryerson University
- x:talk, London-based cooperative network project to support migrant sex workers

== Language scripts and phonetics ==
- X, typographical approximation the Greek letter chi (Χ)
- Kha (Cyrillic), letter of the Cyrillic script
- x, used in the International Phonetic Alphabet for the voiceless velar fricative
- ꭓ, used in the International Phonetic Alphabet for the voiceless uvular fricative

== People ==
=== In arts and entertainment ===
- Director X (born 1975), Canadian music video director, also known as X and Little X
- Márcia X (1959–2005), Brazilian performer and visual artist
- Princess X (musician), former stage name of musician Liza Fox (active since 2010)
- DMX (rapper) (1970–2021), American rapper commonly referred to as "X"
- Shaun Ryder (born 1962), English musician also known as X
- Terminator X (born 1966), stage name for American DJ Norman Roberts, who worked with Public Enemy
- XXXTentacion (1998–2018), American rapper commonly referred to as "X"
- Carl Ouellet (born 1967), Canadian wrestler known by the ring name "X"
- Santiago X (born 1982), American artist with the working name X

=== Other people ===
- X González (born 1999), American gun control activist
- Clyde X (1931–2009), Nation of Islam official
- Khoisan X (1955–2010), political activist
- Laura X (born 1940), feminist historian
- Malcolm X (1925–1965), civil rights activist
- Michael X (1933–1975), activist and criminal
- Xiuhtezcatl Martinez (born 2000), climate activist, often known as "X"
- X, the girl in the X Case, landmark court case about abortion in Ireland
- X, pseudonymous author of the 1947 Foreign Affairs "X Article", formally titled "The Sources of Soviet Conduct"
- X, surname often assumed by members of the Nation of Islam

== Science, technology, and mathematics ==
=== Astronomy ===
- X, signifying a comet of unknown orbit
- Galaxy X (galaxy), postulated dark galaxy
- Planet X, hypothesised planet in the outer solar system

=== Biology and chemistry ===
- × (or x), used in some types of hybrid names in botany
- X chromosome, sex determinant in many animal species, including mammals
- A halogen or halide in organic chemistry (pseudoelement symbol "X")

=== Computing and electronics ===
- OS X (pronounced 'OS ten'), former name of the Apple macOS operating system
- X Window System, referred to as X or X11, a client-server display protocol often used in UNIX environments
- X file format, used by DirectX
- X, the mnemonic for the execute instruction on the TI-990 and the TMS9900
- X#, high-level assembler for the x86 processor architecture as part of the Cosmos operating system
- iPhone X, smartphone by Apple Inc.

=== Mathematics ===
- X, Roman numeral for 10, a number
- x, axis in the Cartesian coordinate system
- x, variable for unknown or changing concepts in mathematics
- A typographical approximation for:
  - Cross product (×)
  - Multiplication sign (× or ✕)

=== Physics ===
- X boson, hypothetical particle
- X (charge), conserved quantum number in particle physics
- X band, part of the microwave band of the electromagnetic spectrum
- X unit, unit of length in physics

=== Other uses in technology ===
- Fujica X-mount, bayonet lens mount used on manual-focus Fujica 35mm film SLR cameras in the 1970s and 1980s
- Fujifilm X-mount, fully electronic bayonet lens mount used on Fujifilm mirrorless APS-C digital cameras and XF lenses since 2012
- Nilgiri Mountain Railway X class

== Automobiles ==
- Tesla Model X, electric crossover by Tesla
- HiPhi X, electric crossover automobile produced from 2020
- Zeekr X, battery electric compact crossover SUV
- BMW X models, series of SUV models

== Other uses ==
- Generation X, the Western sociological generation born after Boomers or Jonesers, and before Millennials
- X (fragrance), set by Irish pop vocal band Westlife
- X (gender identity), used on passports and identification documents to denote intersex or indeterminate gender
- X mark, common written symbol of negation or affirmation
- Strike (bowling), indicated with an X in scorekeeping
- Kiss, as part of "xoxo" for "hugs and kisses"
- MDMA, recreational drug
- Straight edge lifestyle
- ╳, box-drawing character
- Ⓧ, Japanese typographic symbol used in resale price maintenance
- The legal signature of an illiterate person

== See also ==
- The X (disambiguation)
- TEN (disambiguation)
- 10 (disambiguation)
- Xs (disambiguation)
- X's (disambiguation)
- X force (disambiguation)
- X.com (disambiguation)
- XX (disambiguation)
- XXX (disambiguation)
- XXXX (disambiguation)
- ✕ (disambiguation)
