= John Wood (Australian cricketer) =

Australian cricketer (1865–1928)

Personal information
- Full name: John Robert Wood
- Born: 11 April 1865; Newcastle, New South Wales, Australia
- Died: 14 February 1928 (aged 62); London, England
- Source: ESPNcricinfo, 8 February 2017

John Robert Wood (11 April 1865 – 14 February 1928) was an Australian cricketer. He played two first-class matches for New South Wales in 1887/88.

Wood was born in Newcastle, New South Wales, the only son of John Wood, who with his brother Joseph Wood, founded the Castlemaine Brewery in Newcastle. He attended Sydney University.
