= Percy FitzGerald =

Brigadier-General Percy FitzGerald DSO
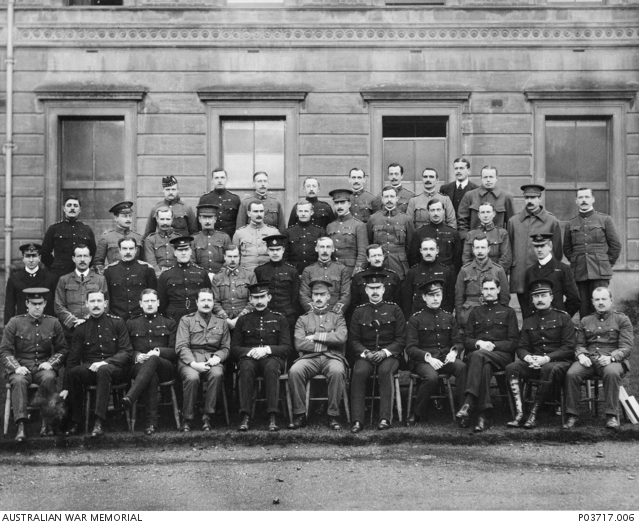
- Group portrait of officers at the Staff College, Camberley, 1906; FitzGerald, then a captain, is in the second row, second on the left
- Born: 18 April 1873; St Kilda, Melbourne, Australia
- Died: 17 August 1933 (aged 60); Marylebone, London, England
- Relatives: Nicholas FitzGerald (father)
- Military career
- Allegiance: United Kingdom
- Branch: British Army
- Service years: 1893–1920
- Rank: Brigadier-General
- Units: Buffs (Royal East Kent Regiment); 11th (Prince Albert's Own) Hussars
- Commands: 5th Mounted Brigade
- Conflicts: Second Boer War; First World War
- Awards: Distinguished Service Order; Mentioned in Despatches (5); Officer of the Legion of Honour (France)

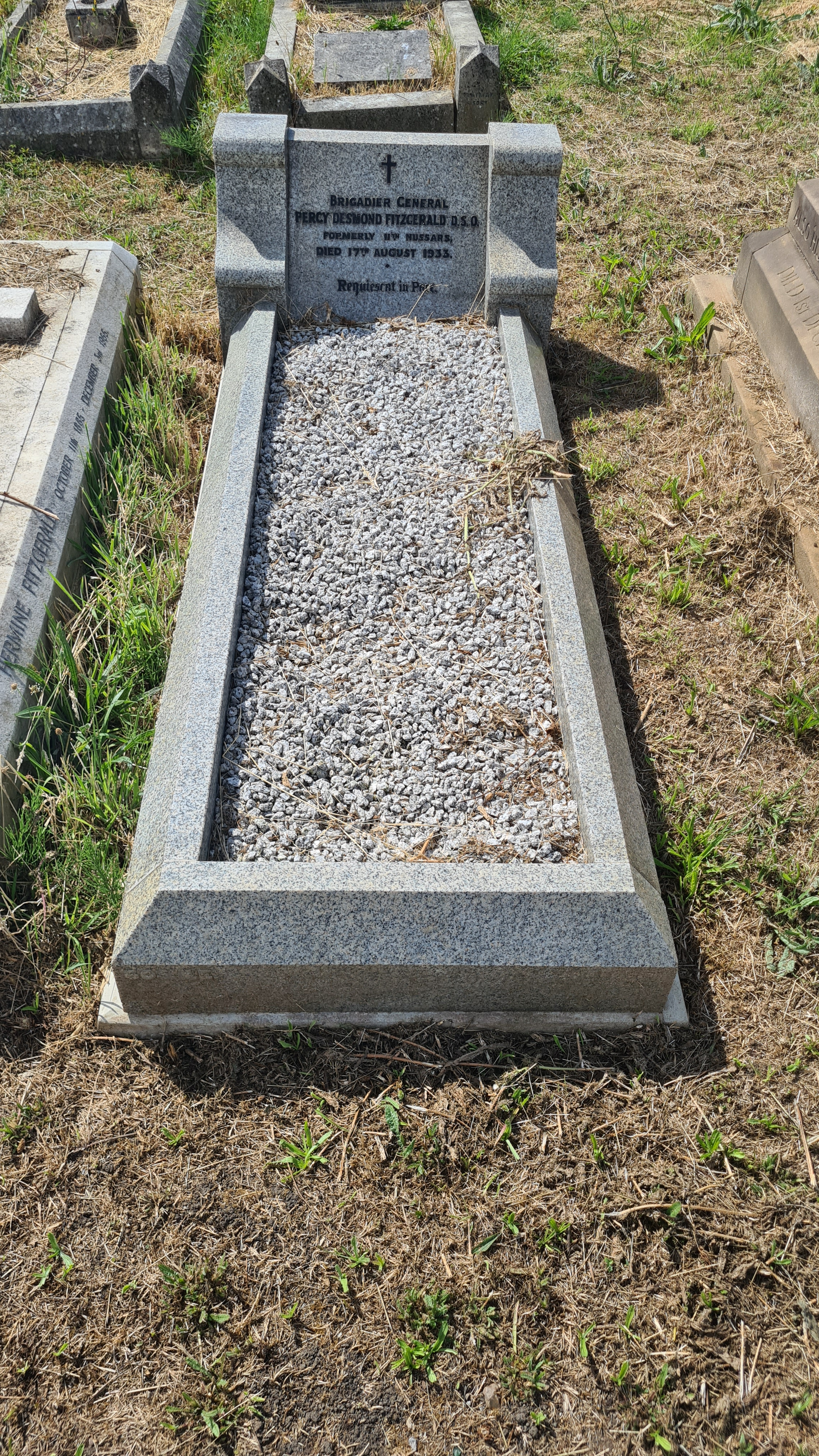
Tomb of Percy FitzGerald at St Mary's Catholic Cemetery, Kensal Green, London

Brigadier-General Percy Desmond FitzGerald, DSO (18 April 1873 – 17 August 1933) was a cavalry officer in the British Army and a sportsman, playing polo and cricket at competition levels.

Born in Australia, he moved to Great Britain and joined the army, initially serving in the Buffs (Royal East Kent Regiment), and then the 11th (Prince Albert's Own) Hussars. The highlight of his military career was as commander of the 5th Mounted Brigade during the Sinai and Palestine campaign.

== Civilian life ==
Percy Desmond FitzGerald was born 18 April 1873 in St Kilda, Melbourne. He was the son of Nicholas FitzGerald and Marianne (née O'Shanassy). His father was member of the Parliament of Victoria, having moved there in 1859 and established the Castlemaine brewery.

FitzGerald was educated at St Mary's College, Oscott. He became a first-class cricketer with the Marylebone Cricket Club in 1897, and a polo player competing several times for the Roehampton Trophy.

In October 1914, during the First World War, he married Lady Millicent Fanny St. Clair-Erskine, the daughter of Robert St Clair-Erskine, 4th Earl of Rosslyn and Blanche Adeliza Fitzroy. The marriage was annulled without issue in 1919. FitzGerald died in Marylebone, London, on 17 August 1933.

== Military career ==
FitzGerald's military career began with the Victorian local military force, but in December 1893 he became a second lieutenant in the Buffs (Royal East Kent Regiment). While still a second lieutenant he transferred from the Buffs to the 11th (Prince Albert's Own) Hussars in January 1894, and on 20 November 1897 he was promoted to lieutenant.

FitzGerald saw service in the Second Boer War, being mentioned in despatches four times and awarded the Distinguished Service Order in 1901. His Queen's South Africa Medal had four clasps: Belfast, Orange Free State, Defence of Ladysmith, Laing's Nek. While still in South Africa, he was appointed adjutant of his regiment on 6 May 1902. Following the war, in December 1903, FitGerald became the aide-de-camp to Brigadier General Michael Rimington, commanding the 3rd Cavalry Brigade. Then, in January 1905, he was promoted to captain. By 1913, FitzGerald had been promoted to major and was holding the position of a brigade major, Staff Officer at the War Office. In April 1914 he was made a GSO3 there.

At the start of the First World War he was General Staff Officer Grade 2. He eventually became a brevet lieutenant colonel and temporary brigadier general, commanding the 5th Mounted Brigade in the Sinai and Palestine campaign. During the war he was again mentioned in despatches, and awarded the French Legion of Honour. He retired from the army in 1920.
