= La X =

La X (English: The X) may refer to:

- "LA X", two 2010 episodes of the American TV series Lost
- La X (radio station), a Colombian music radio brand
- La X (sculpture), Ciudad Juárez, Chihuahua, Mexico

== See also ==
- Lax (disambiguation)
- The X (disambiguation)
