= Tooheys Old =

Australian beer

Tooheys Old beer

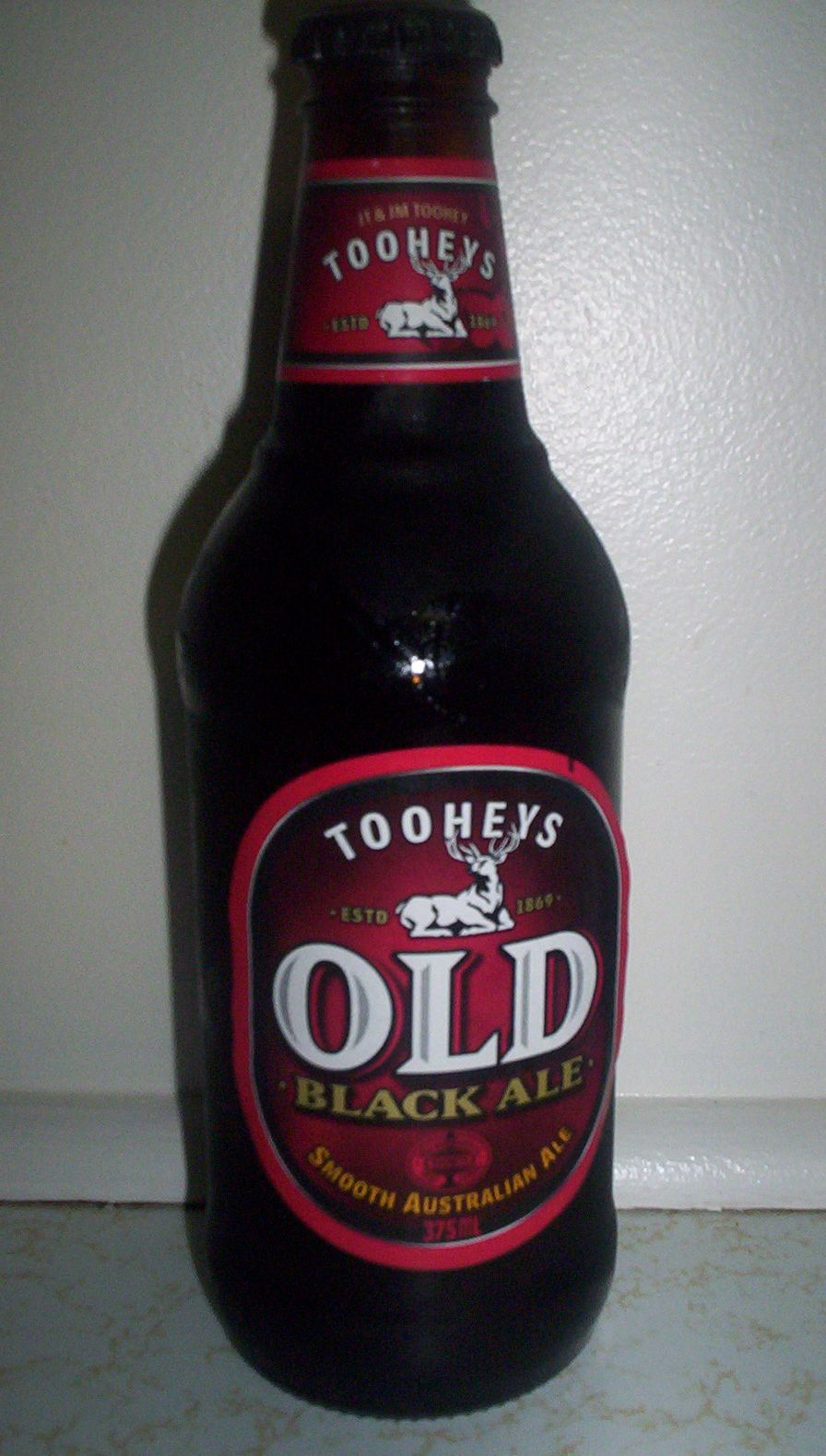
- Bottle of Tooheys Old from 2006
- Manufacturer: Tooheys
- Introduced: 1869
- Alcohol by volume: 4.4%
- Style: Dark mild

Tooheys Old is a dark ale produced in Australia by Tooheys. It has been brewed since 1869 and Tooheys began bottling it in 1970. It has 4.4% alcohol per volume and contains 132 calories. It is on tap in many bars in New South Wales, Australian Capital Territory, South Australia and Queensland. It is made with top fermentation ale yeast, lightly hopped with black malt giving it a very dark, almost blackish, colour.

The beer was formerly known as Tooheys Hunter Old Ale.

It is one of only two Australian mass-produced beers to earn a mention in The Great Beer Guide (ISBN 0-7894-5156-5) along with Dogbolter.

== See also ==
- Australian pub
- Beer in Australia
- List of breweries in Australia
