= XXXX Summer Bright Lager =

Australian beer

XXXN X Summer Bright Lager
- Manufacturer: Castlemaine Perkins
- Introduced: 2010
- Alcohol by volume: 4.0%
- Style: Full strength Low Carb Australian lager
- IBU scale: 8
- Website: https://www.xxxx.com.au/summer-bright/

XXXX Summer Bright Lager is a beer manufactured in the Australian state of Queensland by Castlemaine Perkins.

It is available in three varieties consisting of XXXX Summer Bright Lager, XXXX Summer Bright Lager with lime and XXXX Summer Bright with mango.

== See also ==
- Australian pub
- Beer in Australia
- List of breweries in Australia
