= Lees Whitehead =

English cricketer

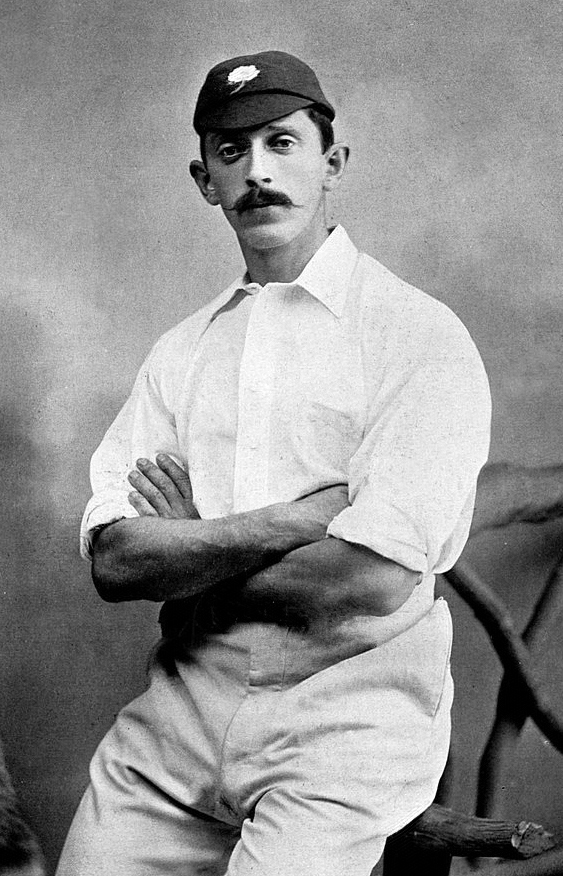
- Whitehead in about 1895

Personal information
- Born: 14 March 1864; Birchen Bank, Saddleworth, England
- Died: 22 November 1913 (aged 49); West Hartlepool, County Durham, England
- Batting: Right-handed
- Bowling: Right-arm fast

Domestic team information
- Years: Team
- 1889–1904: Yorkshire County Cricket Club
- 1890–1903: Marylebone Cricket Club
- 1896: Wembley Park

Career statistics
Competition	FC
Matches	136
Runs scored	2,433
Batting average	15.30
100s/50s	0/12
Top score	67*
Balls bowled	7,186
Wickets	109
Bowling average	25.67
5 wickets in innings	3
10 wickets in match	0
Best bowling	6/45
Catches/stumpings	79/–
- Source: CricInfo, 25 March 2019

Lees Whitehead (14 March 1864 – 22 November 1913) was an English first-class cricketer, who played in 119 games for Yorkshire County Cricket Club between 1889 and 1904. He also appeared in fifteen games for the Marylebone Cricket Club (MCC) (1890-1903) and for Wembley Park (1896) and over 30 (1901) in first-class games.

Born in Birchen Bank, Friarmere near Saddleworth in Yorkshire, Whitehead appeared in a total of 136 first-class matches. He scored 2,433 runs as a right-handed batsman, with a highest score of 67 not out against Somerset. He took seventy nine catches in the field, and took 109 wickets with his right arm fast bowling, with a best return of 6 for 45 against the MCC, at an average of 25.67. He took five wickets in an innings on three occasions. He stood as an umpire in at least three first-class, non-County Championship matches towards the end of his playing career.

Whitehead later became a director of Hartlepool United F.C.
