= Victoria Bitter =

Australian beer brand

- Type: Lager
- Manufacturer: Carlton & United Beverages (Asahi Breweries)
- Origin: Victoria
- Introduced: 1854
- Alcohol by volume: 4.9%
- Style: American Adjunct Lager
- IBU scale: 25
- Website: Official website

Victoria Bitter (VB) is a lager produced by Carlton & United Breweries, a subsidiary of Asahi, in Melbourne, Victoria. It was first brewed by Thomas Aitken at Victoria Brewery in 1854 and is one of the best selling beers in Australia.

== History ==
The origins of Victoria Bitter (VB) date back to the Victoria Brewery founder and head brewer Thomas Aitken, who developed the recipe in 1854. Like most Australian lagers, VB is made using a wortstream brewing process, and uses a portion of cane sugar to thin out the body of the beer.

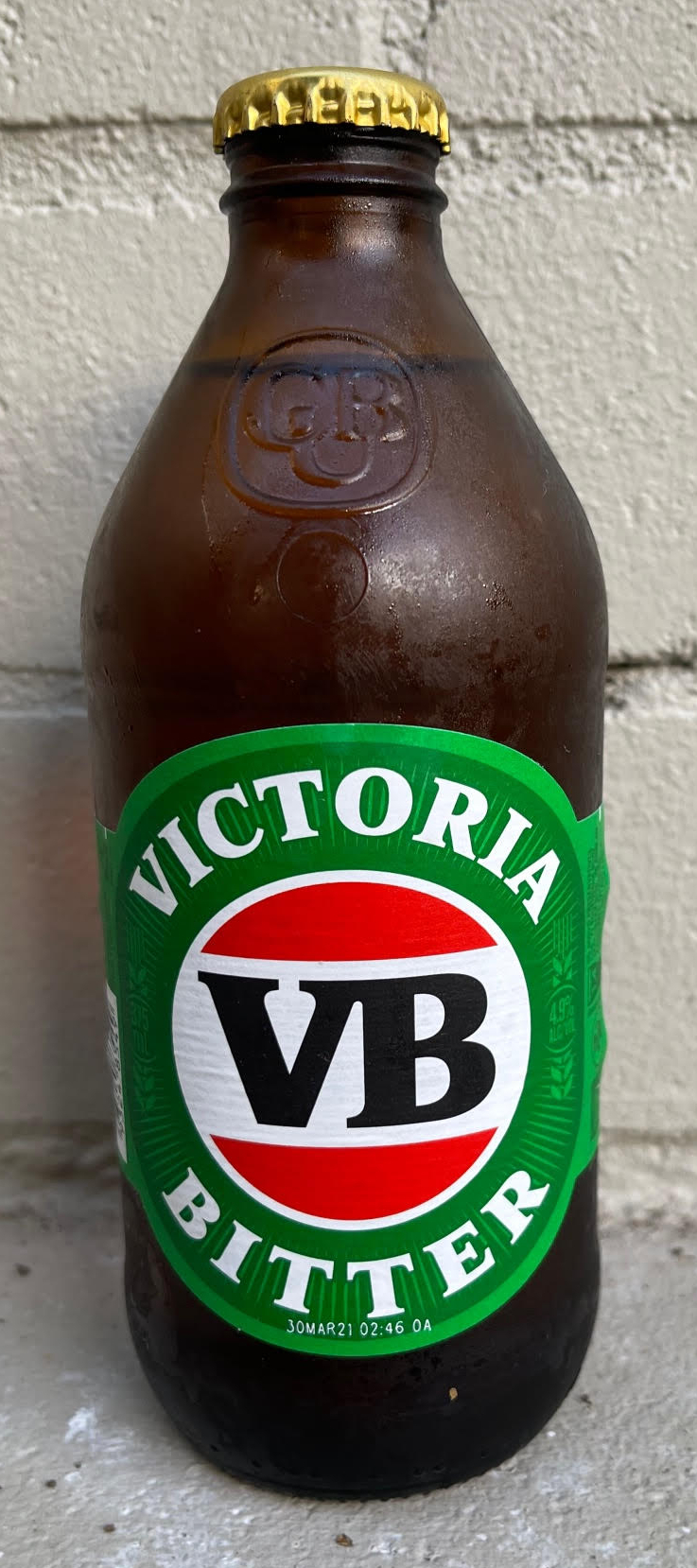
375 ml (13.20 imp fl oz; 12.68 US fl oz) stubby bottle, 4.9% ABV

It is available in bottles of 750, 375, and 250mL, and 500 and 375 mL cans. For a limited time only, VB was available in the Northern Territory in a 1-litre can nicknamed a 'Killer can' (Kilo can). As with all packaged beer sold in Australia it was for many years only available in 750 mL or 26 2/3 fl oz (1/6 imperial gallon) bottles, until the introduction of "stubbies" and smaller cans. In a testament to its long history and popularity, VB has acquired a number of nicknames, ranging from the abbreviated "Vic Bitter", "Veebs", polite "Very Best", "Vitamin B", "Very Bad" and "Victory Beer", for after a win in the footy. At Australian gatherings (for example, backyard barbeques) it is referred to as "The Staple" as being the default brand of beer consumed.

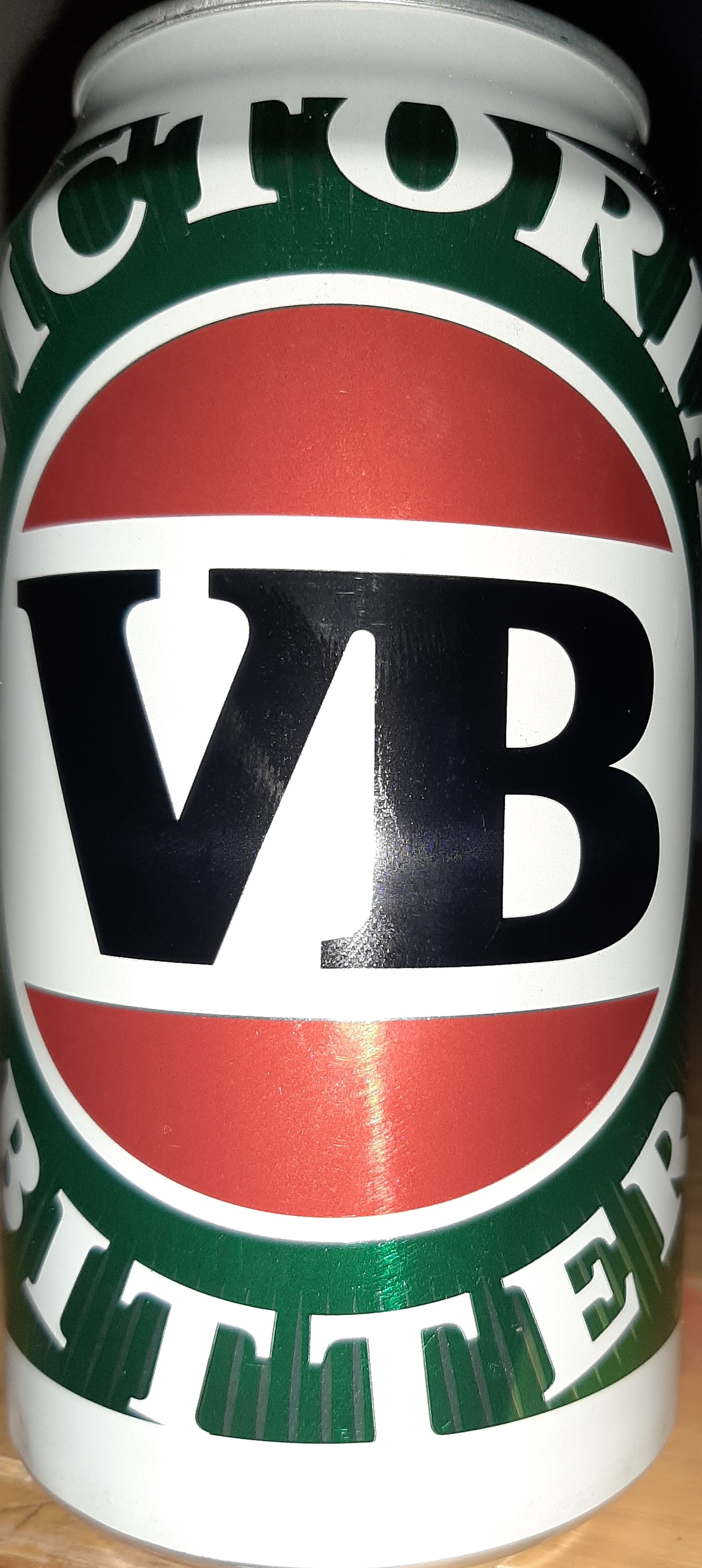
The Victoria Bitter logo on a 375mL can

The beer began to gain wide popularity in the mid 1960s with an innovative television advertising campaign featuring a very similar recording to the theme from the film The Magnificent Seven, images of working-class Australians at work and play, and a voice-over by notable Australian actor John Meillon used the slogan; "For A Hard Earned Thirst." The campaign was used until quite recently and was reinvented in 2018 with the launch of the 'New Knock Off Times' Campaign. In 2004, VB commanded more than a 25 per cent market share, meaning that one in four beers sold in Australia was a VB.

In July 2007, Foster's announced it would cut the alcohol content of VB from 4.9% to 4.8% in a bid to save millions of dollars in tax payments. The brewer cut the alcohol percentage of VB further in 2009, reducing it to 4.6% in an effort to make further savings. On 3 September 2012, CUB announced VB would be going back to its original 4.9% alcohol recipe and its original packaging. CUB had received many complaints since it was changed to 4.6% in 2009, and the beer had lost a large amount of market share. The updated VBs began rolling out in late October 2012. As of 2013, VB was the most popular beer in Australia with 12.2 per cent market share.

== Sales availability ==
According to ACNielsen in 2009, Victoria Bitter was claimed to be Australia's only billion dollar retail beer brand, selling the equivalent of one slab (24 x 375ml cans or bottles) every second. At one time, it sold twice as much as any other full strength beer and was the only Australian beer brand that was in the top 3 sellers in every state. Victoria Bitter held the highest market share of all beer sold in Australia for more than two decades, yet in 2012, it lost this position to XXXX Gold.

In April 2011, VB held 13.7% volume share and XXXX Gold had 11.7%. Just one year on in April 2012, VB had dropped to 12.3%, while XXXX Gold took the lead with 12.4%.

In addition to being sold in Australia, Victoria Bitter is also available in New Zealand, Bali, Indonesia, the UK, and, to a limited extent, other countries abroad. When the joint venture Angkor Brewing Co. was established in Cambodia in 1992, VB was briefly brewed in Sihanoukville, and later imported; it held a significant share of the premium beer market until 1994.

Despite its name, Victoria Bitter is a standard commercial lager rather than a bitter. Since late 2012, Victoria Bitter has been sold at a strength of 4.9% ABV after an interim period of producing the same product at an ABV of 4.6% (equal to virtually every other major Australian lager). The VB sold commercially in New Zealand is both 4.9% and 4.6% available in 375ml quantities in either bottles or cans.

=== VB Gold ===
The VB Midstrength Lager promotional logo.

In 2007, Foster's launched a new, midstrength version of VB called VB Midstrength Lager with an alcohol volume of 3.5% in order to capitalize on the growing market for midstrength beers, currently dominated by XXXX Gold. In May 2007, the launch was Foster's first ever mainstream variation of the VB brand. In 2009, Carlton & United Breweries re-branded VB Midstrength to the new name VB Gold, and in 2017, it reduced the alcohol content to 3%.

TV builder Scott Cam, a self-confessed VB fan, is the appointed VB Mid Ambassador.

On 24 July 2007, The Australian reported that within three months of Fosters launching VB Midstrength, market share for the full strength VB and mid VB had increased. Foster's regional marketing director Anthony Heraghty hinted at further VB brand extensions, saying Foster's was "trying to see past the big green giant".

During the 2008 Rugby League World Cup, VB Gold was advertised on TV by Australian Rugby League legends Wally Lewis and Gorden Tallis.

=== VB RAW ===
In September 2009, CUB released VB RAW to compete in the low carb market. The alcohol volume was 4.5%. VB Raw was discontinued in late 2010 due to poor sales.

== Marketing and promotion ==
In 2009, Foster's replaced the slogan from the '60s "A hard earned thirst needs a big cold beer, and the best cold beer is Vic, Victoria Bitter" with "VB – The Drinking Beer" as part of a marketing strategy to reposition VB to a broader range of drinkers. The new slogan, as part of a campaign called "The Regulars" included a brand website for the first time, including a production line live webcam. Advertising ran on TV and radio, in print, outdoor, online, and at point of sale. In 2015, Carlton and United Breweries revived the "hard earned thirst" campaign. In 2018, Victoria Bitter revisited the idea of knock off with the launch of a new campaign called new knock off times expanding its brand positioning to celebrate Australia's changing workforce. Marking its 50th anniversary of TV advertising, the ad celebrates the change in Australia's workforce that's taken place over the half century. These days, there's no one time that people knock off. 4.00pm might still be the end of the day for some, but for others, it might very well be the beginning of their day.

In 2005, VB had started a promotion where David Boon became the face of Victoria Bitter beer for its 2005/06 summer advertising campaign called Boonanza. Part of the promotion was the sale of a talking David Boon figurine with purchases of cartons of beer, which would make comments when prompted by Channel Nine commentary. In late 2006, the Boonanza promotion returned as Boonanza II for the 2006–07 Ashes series. The promotion included former England cricket captain Ian Botham as a talking figure, who would interact alongside an updated David Boon figure.

For the 2007–08 Australian cricket series, Shane Warne took over as VB spokesperson from David Boon. Warne also had a talking figurine as part of a Warnie promotion, taking over from the highly successful Talking Boony dolls from the two previous Boonanza promotions.

On 6 July 2011, Foster's released VB packaged in limited edition 1958 heritage cans. The packaging had the original artwork of the 1958 VB product, but it also included a standard ring pull on each can, something which was lacking on the original.

VB has invested heavily in sponsorships of Australian rugby league. It is currently the official beer of the NRL, the naming rights sponsor for NRL Friday Night Football and the main sponsor of the Australian national rugby league team, the Kangaroos.

Victoria Bitter was also the main sponsor of the Australian Tri-Series for five years between 2001–02 and 2005–06. During this time the series was renamed The VB Series.

Victoria Bitter were sponsors of the away Test, ODI, and Twenty20 teams for the Australia national cricket team from 2008 to 2014. In 2013, Cricket Australia agreed to remove the logo of Muslim cricketer Fawad Ahmed's uniform due to his faith's ban on alcohol.

The previous advertising campaign was called the Stubby Symphony, where 100 members of the Melbourne and Victorian orchestras play the theme from The Magnificent Seven only using VB beer bottles. The campaign was created by George Patterson Y&R in Melbourne.

VB launched a new advertising campaign in Australia in July 2009 to coincide with the SBS television broadcast of the 2009 The Ashes cricket series. They will drop the famous tag "For a hard earned thirst.." for "VB – The Drinking Beer".

== See also ==
- Australian pub
- Beer in Australia
- List of breweries in Australia
