= XS =

XS may refer to:

== Arts and entertainment ==
- XS (character), a DC Comics superheroine
- XS (manhwa), a South Korean comic by Song Ji-hyung (송지형)
- XS (radio station), a defunct station in Neath Port Talbot, Wales
- "XS" (song), a 2020 song by Rina Sawayama
- XS (video game), a 1997 FPS game made by GT interactive
- Xiaolin Showdown, an American animated television series
- XS: The Opera Opus (1984-86), a no wave opera
- PTS XS, a Taiwanese television channel

== Science, technology, and mathematics ==
- XS (Perl), an interface through which computer programs written in Perl can call C language subroutines
- Yamaha Motif, a series of synthesizers
- XS (EVS), a production server of EVS Broadcast Equipment
- Para-Ski XS, a Canadian powered parachute design
- Cross section (geometry)
- MG XS, the original name of the MG ZS crossover SUV produced by SAIC Motor
- iPhone XS, a smartphone produced by Apple Inc.

== Other uses ==
- XS Energy Drink, drinks produced by AMWAY
- XS (nightclub), located at the Encore hotel in Las Vegas
- Xavier School, a secondary school in San Juan, Metro Manila, Philippines
- Extra Small (XS), a size of clothing

== See also ==
- Excess (disambiguation)
- X's (disambiguation)
