= Castlemaine Brewery Company (Melbourne) =

Australian brewery (1885–1907)

Castlemaine Brewery Company (Melbourne) Ltd was a major brewer in Victoria, Australia, from 1885 until its amalgamation into the new Carlton and United Breweries in 1907.

The Castlemaine Brewery had been founded in 1857 by Edward Fitzgerald, with his brother Nicholas Fitzgerald joining in 1859. The brothers established a number of established successful breweries in Victoria, New South Wales and Queensland in different partnerships. The Melbourne brewery, known as "South Melbourne" at the time but now located in Southbank, was established by Nicholas Fitzgerald in 1872, with James B. Perrins as managing partner.

The Castlemaine Brewery Company (Melbourne) was floated on 1 March 1885 as a public company to acquire the interests of Fitzgerald and Perrins in the Melbourne brewery and associated hotels. Fitzgerald became chairman of directors of the new company, while Perrins became managing director. The company granted their workers an eight hour day in May 1885.

The company's products included ale, porter and stout.

The brewery was continually expanded through the 1870s, 1880s, and 1890s. Some of these buildings are now subject to heritage protection. Perrins remained managing director until his death in 1892, after which Fitzgerald assumed the role; he would be both chairman and managing director until the brewery's amalgamation and closure.

By 1899, the company was facing "unsatisfactory" trading conditions, noting the impact of "severe competition" on profits, despite increased sales. The company formed a cartel, the Society of Melbourne Brewers, with seven other breweries in 1903, in an attempt to end "ruinous competition". However, the company's financial position did not improve by 1906, with no dividend paid for 1905 and Fitzgerald seeking to retire and seeking a "settlement of the present very unsatisfactory conditions."

In 1907 it amalgamated with five other major breweries to form Carlton & United Breweries. CUB immediately proposed to centralise brewing at three premises and to close the remaining three, including the Castlemaine brewery. The brewery buildings and site were sold off and used for other commercial purposes.

Castlemaine Brewery Company (Melbourne) Ltd became a holding company for Carlton and United Breweries, formally continuing to exist until March 1973.
