= Pumpkin Island =

Privately owned Australian island in Keppel Bay

Coordinates: 23.0924°S 150.9009°E

Native name: Koey Ngurtai
- Interactive map of Pumpkin Island

Geography
- Area: 0.06 km^{2} (0.023 sq mi)

Administration
- Australia
- State: Queensland
- Region: Central Queensland

Pumpkin Island is a privately owned island in Keppel Bay on the southern Great Barrier Reef in Australia. It is 13.8 kilometres (8.6 mi) off the coast from Yeppoon and has an area of 6.1 Hectares. In 2012 it was listed in Australian media as the world's sixth most expensive private island available to hire.

The island is owned and operated by Sojourn Properties Pty Ltd, a Queensland-based company and run by Sojourn Retreats. The resort operates using wind and solar power systems, gas hot water, and filtered rain water for use as drinking water for its "7 self-catering units" which accommodate up to 34 guests combined.

The island is one of four properties owned by the company as of 2020. The others are Eden, Yeppoon; Sandcastles, Zilzie; and Elysian Retreat on Long Island.

Before 1961, the island was an oyster farm owned by Snigger Findlay who lost it in a poker game to Roger Mason. By 1964, it was operating as a tourist destination. Sojourn Properties purchased the island in 2003 when it was a "low-key private resort" defined by the Rumbles as more of a "fisherman’s hideaway". In addition to renovations and new buildings, they added a helicopter pad, two registered moorings and a 36-passenger boat for ferrying clients.

Between 2012 and 2015 the island was leased by Queensland brewer Castlemaine Perkins and, for the duration, renamed XXXX Island as a promotional campaign for their beer, Castlemaine XXXX. The company held contests and island escapes were offered as prizes. By 2016, the island was being renovated to become an advanced eco retreat. During the XXXX era, 3,000 people visited.

Pumpkin was recognised in 2019 as Australasia's most sustainable hotel at the World Boutique Hotel Awards, adding to its accomplishments that include Climate Action Leader and the first beyond carbon neutral island in Australia.

The address for Pumpkin Island is Keppel Islands, Yeppoon, Queensland, Australia.

== See also ==
- List of islands of Australia
