= Tooheys Brewery =

Australian brewery

Tooheys Brand
- Founded: 1869
- Headquarters: Sydney, New South Wales, Australia
- Products: Beer, cider
- Production output: 3 million hectolitres (2,600,000 US bbl)
- Owner: Lion (Kirin)
Lidcombe Site
- Interactive map of Lidcombe Site
- Location: 29 Nyrang Street, Lidcombe, New South Wales, Australia
- Coordinates: 33°51′00″S 151°02′41″E
- Website: tooheys.com.au
- Website: Tooheys Beer Heritage

Tooheys is a beer brand and brewery in the suburb of Lidcombe, in Sydney, Australia. It produces beer under the Tooheys and Hahn Brewery trademarks, and is part of the Lion beverages group which was acquired by the Japanese Kirin Company in 2009.

== History ==
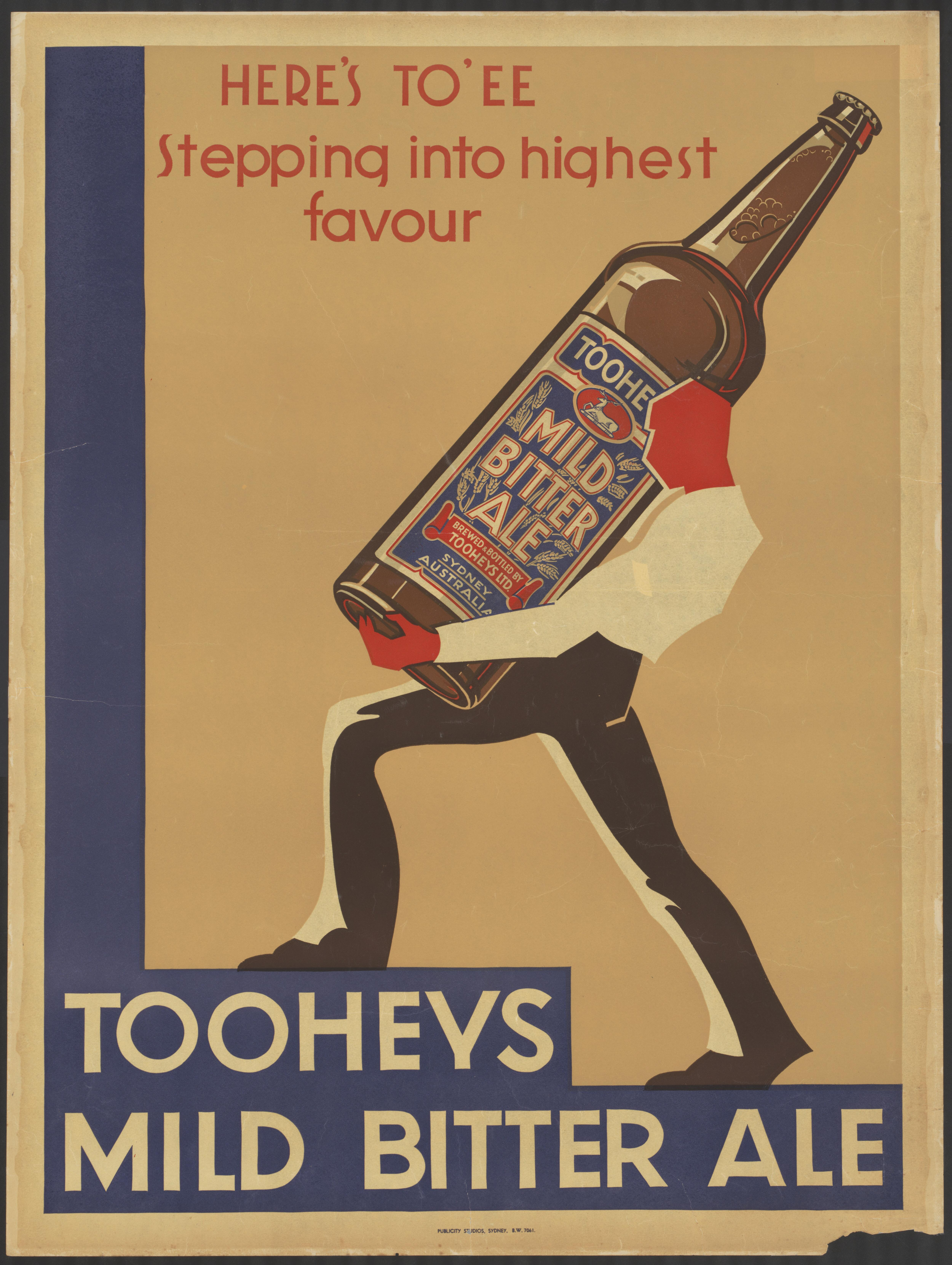
1930s poster advertising Tooheys Mild Bitter Ale

The foundation of Tooheys dates back to 1869, when John Thomas Toohey (an Irish immigrant to Melbourne) obtained his brewing licence. Toohey and his brother James Matthew ran pubs in Melbourne (The Limerick Arms and The Great Britain) before moving to Sydney in the 1860s. They commenced brewing Tooheys Black Old Ale in a brewery in the area of present-day Darling Harbour. By 1875, demand for their beer had soared and they established The Standard Brewery in inner-city Surry Hills. In 1902, the company went public as Tooheys Limited, and commenced brewing lager (the present-day Tooheys New) in 1930. In 1955, the brewery moved west to Lidcombe. In 1967, Tooheys bought competitor Miller's Brewers located in Taverner's Hill, closing that brewery in 1975.

In March 1980, Tooheys merged with Castlemaine Perkins to form Castlemaine Tooheys. Bond Corporation purchased Castlemaine Tooheys in 1985.

Castlemaine Tooheys were represented as the appellants in the landmark 1990 case of Castlemaine Tooheys Ltd v South Australia, heard by the High Court of Australia. Since the brewery operated outside South Australia, but sold its products there, a South Australian Act Amendment, imposing a substantial refund value for non-refillable bottles produced in other states, was ruled to be inconsistent with section 92 of the Constitution of Australia. Due to the significant discriminatory and protectionist financial impacts that they faced, Castlemaine Tooheys successfully invalidated the law.

Lion Nathan acquired a 50% stake in Bond's Natbrew Holdings in 1990, and took total ownership in 1992. Production of Hahn-branded beers was moved from the Camperdown Hahn Brewery to Tooheys, some time between 1993 (Lion's acquisition of Hahn) and 1999 (when Hahn Brewery was renamed Malt Shovel Brewery).

Products sold under the Tooheys trademark are brewed at Tooheys Brewery. Home-brew kits are distributed by Lion and produced at Canterbury Brewery.

== Sponsorships ==
Tooheys is a major sponsor of the most popular sport in the state, rugby league. Tooheys New sponsors the New South Wales rugby league team in the annual State of Origin series, the biggest sporting event in the state. The Tooheys New logo appears on the Blues' sleeves. The team was previously known by the sponsored name of the Tooheys Blues. Tooheys New is also the sponsor of many Country Rugby League competitions across the state as well as being available at almost every rugby league venue in the state.

The Tooheys Challenge Cup was a rugby league competition that ran in the 1990s sponsored by the company. Tooheys remains the principal beer partner of the New South Wales Rugby League team in State of Origin, appearing on the team's jersey sleeves and shorts.

As of 2015, the Tooheys brand also was the major sponsor of rugby union in New South Wales and Queensland. It was naming rights sponsor of the Bathurst 1000 from 1988 until 1995 and the Melbourne Cup from 2001 until 2003.

== Current beers ==
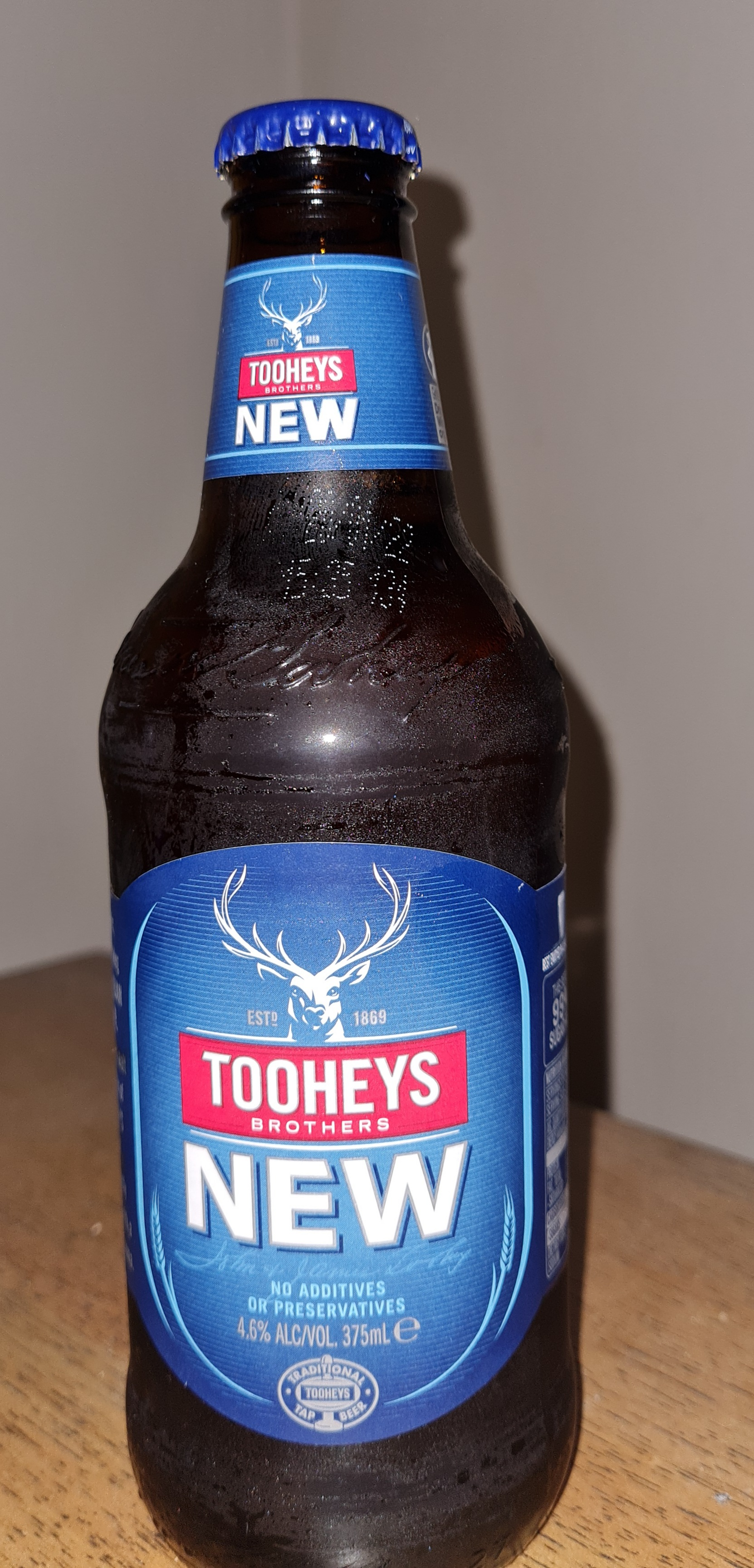
375 mL bottle of Tooheys New

- Tooheys New is an Australian lager, first brewed in 1930. It has a 4.6% ABV.
- Tooheys Old is a dark ale supposedly similar to the Toohey brothers' original brew. It has a 4.4% ABV.
- Tooheys Extra Dry is a lower carb dry style lager, available on tap and in bottles. It has a 4.3% ABV
- Tooheys Extra Dry Platinum is a dry, crisp style lager with a 6.5% ABV.
- Hahn Super Dry was launched in October 2006. A lower carb lager with a 4.6% ABV.
- Hahn Super Dry 3.5 is a mid-strength lower carb lager with a 3.5% ABV.
- Hahn GF is a gluten free lower carb lager with a 4.2% ABV.
- Hahn Ultra is a low carb lager (<1g per 330ml) with a 4.2% ABV.
- Hahn Premium Light was launched in 1998.
- Tooheys Ultra. A zero-carbohydrate lager launched in 2024 with a 4.2% ABV.

== Discontinued beers ==
- Red Bitter was formerly known as Tooheys Red, 4.0 to 4.2% ABV
- Gold Bitter was formerly Tooheys Gold, mid-strength, 3.0% ABV
- Blue Bitter was formerly Tooheys Blue, a low-alcohol "lite" version, 2.3% ABV
- Tooheys Flag Ale
- Hahn Premium, a German-style lager, was launched in 1988.
- Tooheys Country Special
- Tooheys Blue Ice
- Tooheys Amber Bitter
- Tooheys 2.2 Lite
- Tooheys Classic
- MeZ
- Tooheys Extra Dry Platinum, launched in 2007, is a beer with increased alcohol content of 6.5%.
- Tooheys Pils is a pale lager, launched in 1998.
- Tooheys New White Stag is a low-carb beer launched in 2008.
- Tooheys Darling Pale Ale

== Ciders ==
launched in 2009.

- Tooheys 5 Seeds Cider
- 5 Seeds Cloudy Apple Cider
- 5 Seeds Sour Apple Cider
- 5 Seeds Crisp Apple Cider
- 5 Seeds Lower Sugar Apple Cider
- 5 Seeds Night Orchard Apple Cider with Vodka
- 5 Seeds Night Orchard Apple Cider with Vodka And Berries

== See also ==
- Australian pub
- Beer in Australia
- List of breweries in Australia
- List of cider brands
