= Nicholas Fitzgerald (politician) =

Australian politician (1829–1908)

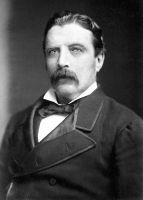
Portrait of Nicholas Fitzgerald

Nicholas Fitzgerald (7 August 1829 – 17 August 1908) was an Australian brewer, company director and politician. He was co-founder of the Castlemaine brewery in Melbourne, chairman of directors of the Castlemaine Brewery Company (Melbourne) and a member of the Victorian Legislative Council from 1864 until 1907.

== Early life and business career ==
Fitzgerald was born in Galway, Ireland to Francis Fitzgerald and Eleanor Joyes. He was educated at Trinity College, Dublin and Queen's College, Galway and entered the King's Inns in 1848. He worked in both Ceylon and India before following his brother, Edward Fitzgerald, to Victoria in 1859. His brother had established a brewery at Castlemaine in 1857, and Fitzgerald joined him in the business upon his arrival. The Castlemaine Brewery was successful and the brothers went on to own breweries in Victoria, New South Wales and Queensland. He co-founded their Melbourne brewery with partner J. B. Perrins in 1872, floated it as the Castlemaine Brewery Company (Melbourne) Ltd in 1885, and was its chairman of directors from 1885 until was one of six breweries to amalgamate to form Carlton and United Breweries in 1907, at which time he retired from business.

== Political career ==
Fitzgerald was a member of the Victorian Legislative Council for North Western Province from 1864 to 1882, for North Central Province 1882 to 1904, and for Southern Province from June 1904 until his death on 17 August 1908. He also represented Victoria at the Federal Convention in Sydney in 1891 and the Colonial Conference of 1894 in Ottawa, where he represented both Victoria and Tasmania.

== Personal life ==
In 1863 Fitzgerald married Marianne O'Shanassy, with whom he had seven sons. One, Percy, was a first-class cricketer and brigadier general in the British Army, whole another, Francis, was also a first-class cricketer, in addition to being a barrister. Nicholas Fitzgerald died in St Kilda on 17 August 1908.
