= Edward Fitzgerald (brewer) =

Australian brewer

Edward Fitzgerald (c. 1824 – 19 March 1890) was an Australian brewer and solicitor. He was the founder of the Castlemaine Brewery, which went on to have significant operations in Victoria, New South Wales and Queensland.

Fitzgerald was born in Ireland, the son of a brewer, was educated at Trinity College, Dublin and became a solicitor in Ireland. He migrated to Victoria as a result of the Victorian gold rush, had an unsuccessful stint as a miner at Moonlight Flat, near Castlemaine, and then practised as a solicitor in Castlemaine. While practicing as a solicitor there, he established the Castlemaine Brewery in 1857. His brother, Nicholas Fitzgerald, followed him to Victoria and joined him in the business in 1859. The Castlemaine Brewery became highly successful, opening breweries in Melbourne, Newcastle, Sydney and Brisbane, each of which was later floated as a separate company, as well as breweries at Daylesford and Newbridge. He continued to hold interests in the various breweries, invested in mining companies, and was a Borough of Castlemaine councillor and trustee of St Mary's Orphanage.

Fitzgerald died on 19 March 1890 at his home, Ardmore, at Brighton. He had been severely injured some time before when he tripped on the staircase at the Athenaeum Club in Melbourne and fell twenty feet, never recovering from his injuries. A large funeral was held at Castlemaine and he was buried at the cemetery at Campbells Creek. A stained glass window in his memory was erected in St Mary's Catholic Church, Castlemaine.
