= Australian lager =

Style of beer

Australian lager is pale lager that is produced in Australia. The pale lager-style beer originated in Europe in the mid-19th century, and moved to Australia with German immigrants. As a general trend outside of Bavaria and the Czech Republic where the beers may be firmly hopped, pale lager developed as a modestly hopped beer, and sometimes used adjuncts such as rice or corn – and this was also true in Australia.

Beer from XXXX, various Tooheys' brands, Victoria Bitter (which is classified as a lager), West End Draught, Swan, Young Henrys, and Foster's Lager, are Australian lagers. An Australian lager has an amber hue and slightly bitter flavour typically brewed with Pride of Ringwood hops or its descendants.

== See also ==
- Australian pub
- Beer in Australia
