= Foster's Group =

Australian beer producer

Foster's Group Limited
- Type: Subsidiary
- Industry: Beverages
- Founded: 1888; 138 years ago
- Founder: William and Ralph Foster
- Headquarters: Southbank, Melbourne, Australia
- Key people: Ari Mervis, Chief Executive Officer
- Products: Victoria Bitter; Foster's Lager
- Parent: Asahi Group Holdings

Foster's Group Pty. Ltd. was an Australian beer group with interests in brewing and soft drinks, known for Foster's Lager, now called Carlton & United Breweries since the company was renamed in 2011. Foster's was founded in 1888 in Melbourne, Victoria by two American brothers, who sold the brewery a year later.

The company was renamed prior to sale to British-South African multinational SABMiller in 2011. Foster's wine business was split into a separate company, Treasury Wine Estates, in May 2011. In October 2016 Anheuser-Busch InBev acquired SABMiller, which ceased trading as a corporation, making the Foster's Group a direct subsidiary of the parent company. In June 2020, Carlton and United Breweries was sold to the Japanese beverage giant, Asahi Group Holdings.

== History ==
Foster's was founded in Melbourne in 1888 by two American brothers William and Ralph Foster of New York, United States, who happened to own a refrigeration plant. Cooling was necessary to brew and store acceptable lagers in Australia's hot climate, unlike the English-style dark ales commonly brewed at the time. They sold the brewery the following year and returned to the United States.

In 1983 Elders IXL, a giant Australian diversified conglomerate, purchased Carlton and United Breweries, and renamed it Elders Brewing Group. Then in 1990, the Elders Brewing Group changed its name to the Foster's Group, to reflect the name of their most internationally recognised product.

In 2005, Foster's Group acquired the Australian wine-making group Southcorp Wines. This acquisition added famous brands such as Penfolds, Lindemans and Rosemount to the Foster's stable and around A$1 billion to revenues.

In May 2011, Foster's Group's Treasury Wine Estates unit was spun off into a separate company. The first day of trading saw its share price soaring, valuing the separate entity at A$2.2 billion.

There had long been speculation that the beer sector or all of Foster's Group would be subject to a takeover by a larger firm. Groups to express such an interest over the years have included Diageo, the British-South African company SABMiller, Molson Coors and Heineken International. Foster's Group was renamed Carlton & United Breweries (CUB), and its wine business split into a separate company, Treasury Wine Estates, in May 2011. CUB was sold to SABMiller in September 2011, valued at A$9.9bn (US$10.2bn; £6.5bn). Foster's Group Limited shares (ASX code: FGL) were suspended from trading on the ASX on 2 December 2011 and delisted from the ASX at close of trading on 20 December 2011.

On 10 October 2016 Anheuser-Busch InBev acquired SABMiller. SABMiller was delisted and ceased trading on global stock markets, and Foster's Group became a direct subsidiary of Anheuser-Busch InBev SA/NV. As a result, Foster's Group became a direct subsidiary of Anheuser-Busch InBev SA/NV.

In 2019, Business Insider reported that Asahi Group Holdings, a large Japanese beverage corporation, would buy Anheuser-Busch InBev's Australian assets, "including Foster's beer and Carlton and United Breweries". In June 2020, Anheuser-Busch InBev completed the sale of Carlton and United Breweries to Asahi Group Holdings.

== Business ==
In 1990, Asahi Breweries acquired a 19.9% stake in Australian brewery giant Elders IXL which later became Foster' s Group.

Foster's Group imports, licenses, and distributes a large number of brands. In Australia, Foster's distributes the Cinzano, Perrier, Skyy vodka, Stella Artois, and 42 Below import brands among many others. While in the United States and Canadian markets, Molson brews and sells Foster's Lager under license.

In August 2008, it was convicted and fined more than A$1 million for two breaches of Victoria's Occupational Health and Safety Act which led to the death of a worker in 2006. The prosecution of the company by the Director of Public Prosecutions for WorkSafe Victoria resulted in a call for the company to better report on health and safety in its annual report.

CEO Trevor O'Hoy resigned on 10 June 2008 after poor performance by the wine division of the group. O'Hoy was replaced by Ian Johnston on 21 July 2008 in the position of acting CEO.

Foster's announced yearly results which ended on 30 June 2009. The net sales revenue increases by 2.7% to A$4.5 billion. Net profit increases by 4.0% to A$741.5m and earnings per share increases by 4.6% to 38.5 cents.

In 2011, Fosters made major losses that including a write-down in the value of the wines division to A$1.8 billion that at the business's AGM in Melbourne on 29 April 2011, 99% of Fosters Group shareholders agreed to split Fosters Group business into two separate brewing and wines companies. The wines business became Treasury Wine Estates, and was listed on the ASX on 10 May 2011. In an ABC interview in late August 2011, the Carlton United Group (Fosters beer division) announced that they would be focusing more on craft beer to meet the change in taste of the Australian drinker.

In 2011, Foster's was acquired by SABMiller; the latter was acquired by Anheuser-Busch InBev SA/NV in October 2016.

== Brands ==
=== Beers and breweries ===
- Carlton & United Breweries
  - Carlton Black
  - Carlton Draught
  - Crown Lager
  - Melbourne Bitter
  - NT Draught
  - Pure Blonde
  - Reschs
  - Sheaf Stout
  - Victoria Bitter
  - Victoria Bitter Gold
- Cascade Brewery
  - Cascade Amber Ale
  - Cascade Bitter
  - Cascade Blonde Lager
  - Cascade Draught
  - Cascade Export Stout
  - Cascade Green
  - Cascade Lager
  - Cascade Pale Ale
  - Cascade Premium Lager
  - Cascade Premium Light
  - Cascade Stout
- Foster's
  - Foster's Premium Ale
  - Foster's Lager
  - Foster's Lightice
  - Foster's Radler
- Great Northern Brewing Co.
- Grolsch
- KB
- Matilda Bay Brewing Company
  - Alpha Pale Ale
  - Beez Neez
  - Big Helga
  - Bohemian Pilsner
  - Dog Bolter Dark Lager
  - Fat Yak
  - Redback
- Miller
  - Miller Chill
  - Miller Genuine Draft
- Peroni
  - Peroni Nastro Azzurro
- Pilsner Urquell
- Power's Brewery
  - Power's Bitter
  - Power's dry
  - Power's Gold

=== Cider ===
- Bulmers
- Mercury
- Strongbow

=== Spirits ===
- Akropolis Oyzo
- Barossa Brandy
- Black Jack
- Continental Liqueurs
- Cougar Bourbon
- Coyote Tequila
- Karloff
- Kirov
- Prince Albert's Gin
- The Black Douglas

=== Non-alcohol ===
- Cascade
- Torquay

== See also ==
- List of breweries in Australia
