= Ballarat Bitter =

Beer brewed by Ballarat Brewing Company of Ballarat, Australia

Ballarat Bitter Can; produced in 2006

Ballarat Bitter is a 4.9% (abv) Australian beer, originally brewed in Ballarat, Australia by the Ballarat Brewing Company and was until recently owned by the Japanese conglomerate Asahi Breweries.

== History ==
The beer is of the bitter top fermented ale variety, and was traditionally sold in 750ml longnecked bottles, with the label featuring the character "Ballarat Bertie", who was conceived in 1926 on a train journey between Melbourne and Sydney by a Ballarat Brewing Company director and an advertising agency.

The Ballarat Brewing Company beer division was bought out by Carlton & United Beverages (or Carlton & United Breweries as it was known at the time, commonly abbreviated to 'CUB') in 1989, and the Ballarat bottling operations subsequently closed. The Ballarat Brewing Company itself, board of directors and ownership of 160 pubs across Victoria continued until taken over by Foster's Group in 1997 with its buyout of remaining shares.

Ballarat Bitter is once again owned by the family that founded it almost 170 years ago. Stephen Coghlan – a descendant of brewery founder James Coghlan – has purchased the brand and its iconic mascot from Asahi, the parent company of Carlton & United Breweries, some 70 years after the latter acquired Ballarat Brewing Company from his family.

== Limited edition releases ==
In December 2006, following a request by the crew of the Anzac class frigate HMAS Ballarat (which uses the caricature of "Ballarat Bertie" from the label as a mascot) to Catherine King, the Member of Parliament representing the Division of Ballarat, Foster's Group (CUB's parent company) created a limited run of the beer. An initial release of 40 pallets (4,800 slabs, 115,200 individual cans) sold out within days of release, with $1 from every slab donated to the United Way charities. A second run of 50 pallets was released shortly after.

In November 2011 another limited edition release of the beer was brewed by CUB, with the 300 kegs being distributed between 26 licensed premises in Ballarat for the Ballarat Cup weekend. A limited supply of cans was available the following month.

== See also ==
- Australian pub
- Beer in Australia
- List of breweries in Australia
