= Carlton & United Breweries =

Australian beverage manufacturer

Coordinates: 37°49′22.73″S 144°58′01.72″E

- Type: Subsidiary
- Industry: Alcoholic beverage
- Founded: 1907; 119 years ago
- Headquarters: Melbourne, Victoria, Australia
- Key people: Peter Filipovic (CEO)
- Products: Victoria Bitter; Great Northern; Carlton Draught; Pure Blonde; Resch’s; Foster’s; Melbourne Bitter; Balter; 4 Pines Brewing Company; Green Beacon Brewing Co.; Pirate Life Brewing; Vodka Cruiser; Power’s
- Parent: Asahi Breweries
- Website: cub.com.au

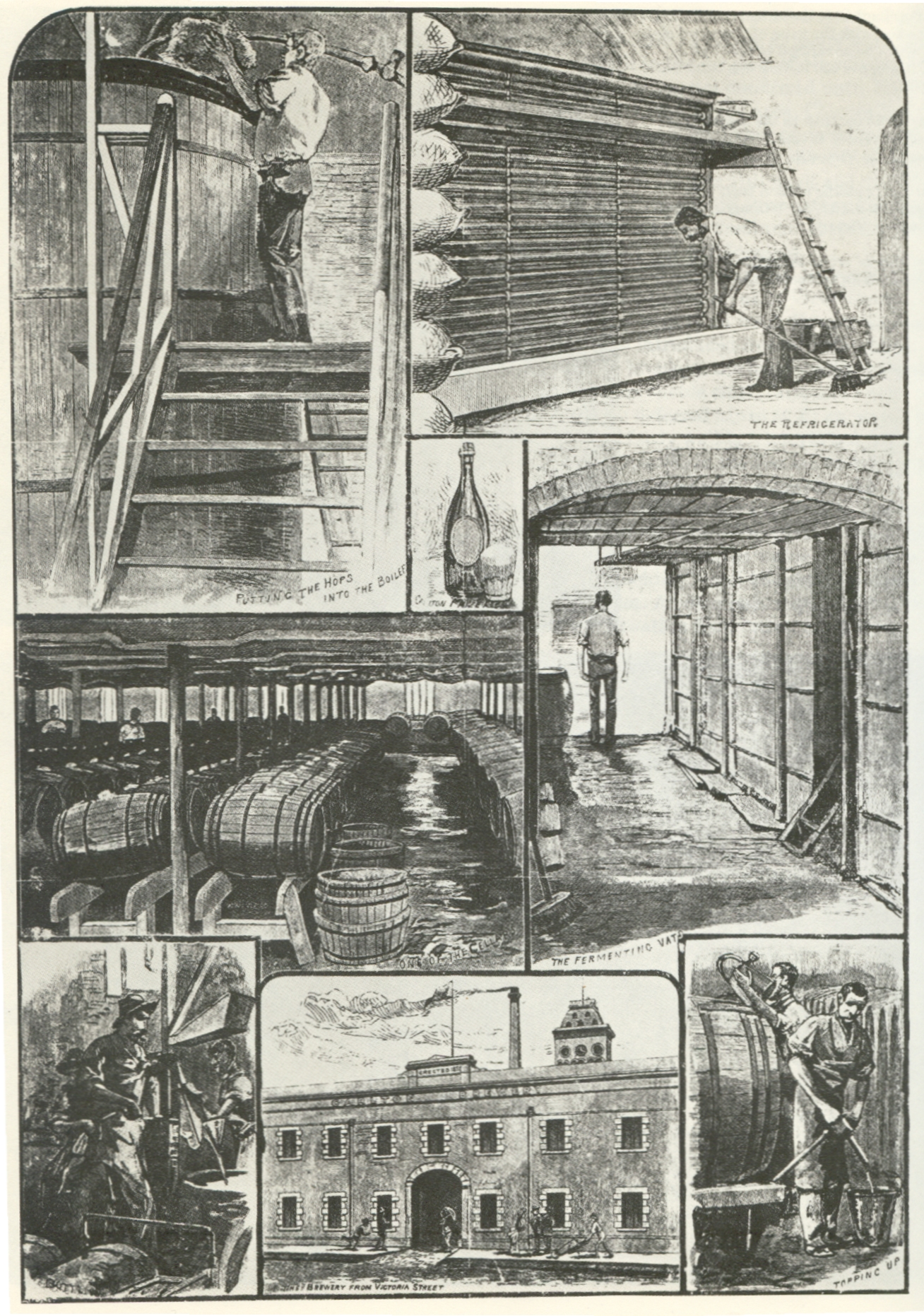
Carlton breweries in 1886

Carlton & United Breweries (CUB) is an Australian brewing company based in Melbourne and owned by Japanese conglomerate Asahi Breweries. Its notable brands include Victoria Bitter, Carlton Draught, Foster's Lager, Great Northern, Resch's, Pure Blonde and Melbourne Bitter.

CUB was established in 1904 as a merger of six existing breweries with Carl Pinschof as chairman and became a public company in 1913. It first expanded outside Victoria in 1931 and acquired a number of other brewing companies over the following decades. In 1983 it became a wholly owned subsidiary of Elders IXL and CUB was delisted from the stock exchange. In 1990, Elders IXL was renamed Foster's Group, and in July 2004, Fosters Group changed its name to Carlton & United Beverages. In February 2009, CUB announced the decision to separate the Australian Wine division from the Australian Beer, Cider & Spirits (BCS) division, and rename BCS to Carlton & United Breweries.

In December 2011, American multinational SABMiller acquired Foster's Group, and took over ownership of Carlton & United Breweries as part of the acquisition. Subsequently, in October 2016, CUB was included in the purchase of SABMiller by Anheuser-Busch InBev. SABMiller ceased trading on global stock markets and as a result, Carlton & United was then owned by Anheuser-Busch InBev.

In July 2019, Asahi Breweries agreed to purchase CUB, with the Australian Competition & Consumer Commission and Foreign Investment Review Board approving the deal in May 2020.

== History ==
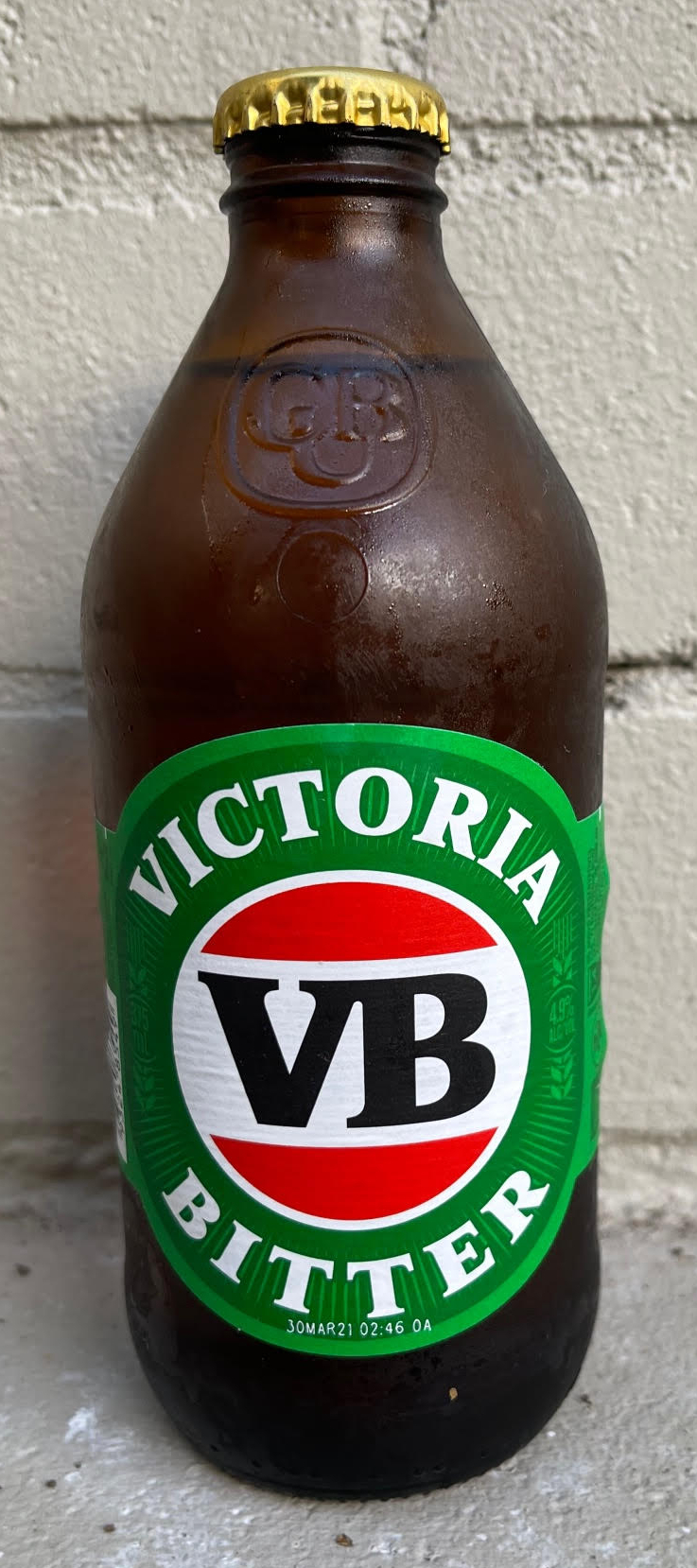
Bottle of Victoria Bitter

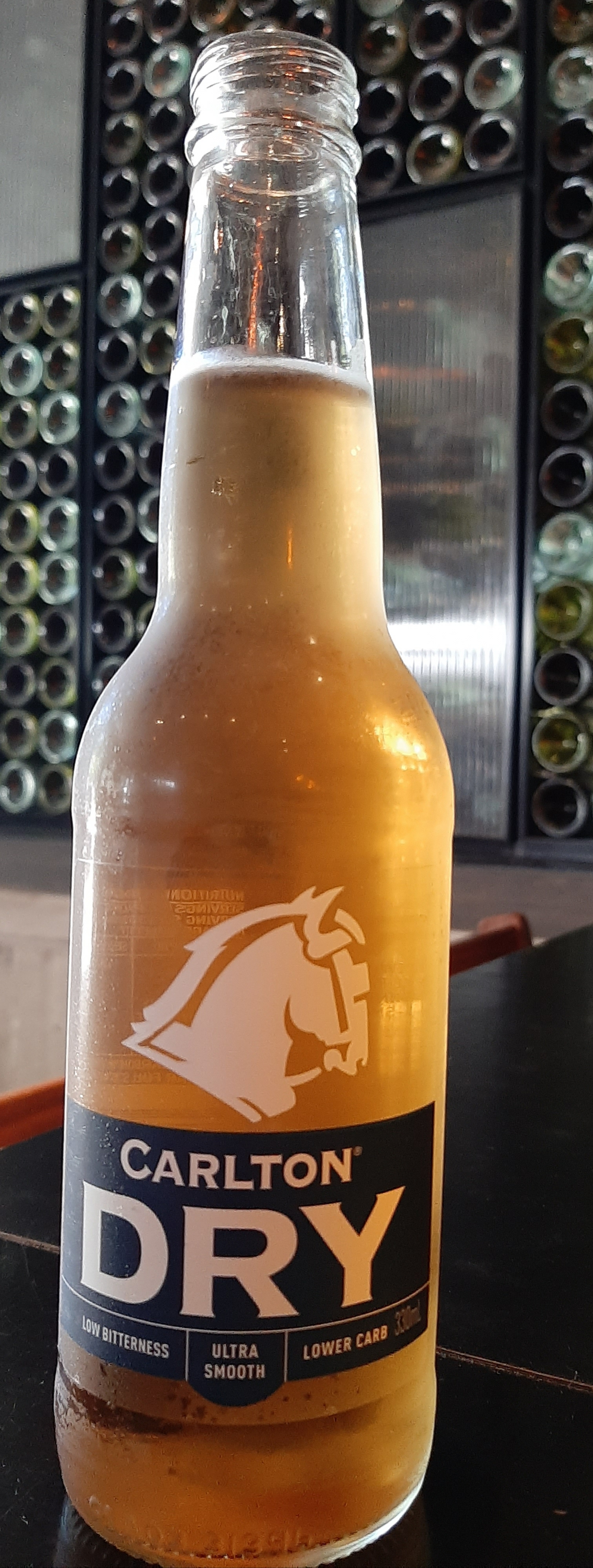
Carlton Dry Bottle

Carlton and United Breweries was formed in 1904 with the merger of six major Australian breweries: Carlton Brewery, Castlemaine Brewery Company (Melbourne), Foster Brewing Company, McCracken's City Brewery, Shamrock Brewing and Malting Company and Victoria Brewery. The six breweries - along with another two (Melbourne Brewery and Distillery Pty Ltd and Coghlan and Tulloch's Ballarat Brewing Co Ltd) - had formed a cartel known as the Society of Melbourne Brewers in 1903. Emil Resch played a significant role in enabling the amalgamation. Resch also went on to become the first general manager of CUB. The company became public in 1913 with the issue of 100,000 shares.

Over time it has bought out many other brewers, such as Abbotsford Co-operative Brewery in 1924 (a company set up by independent hoteliers to combat the anti-competitive nature of the Society of Melbourne Brewers.) Their first interstate acquisition was Northern Australian Breweries and the Cairns Brewery in 1931. Further acquisitions were the Ballarat Brewing Company, Queensland Brewery Ltd, Thos McLauchlin & Co Pty Ltd, Richmond Brewery and Tooth & Co.

In 1983, CUB was wholly bought by Elders IXL, a giant Australian diversified conglomerate with pastoral, financial, materials, and food interests. Elders Brewing Group (as it then became known as) continued to acquire brewing companies in the United Kingdom, Canada and the United States. In 1990 Elders Brewing Group changed its name to Foster's Group, to reflect the name of their most internationally recognised product.

In 1985, CUB purchased the Tooth and Co. site on Broadway in Sydney. The company demolished all of the existing Kent Brewery buildings on this site, except for one. CUB Management decided to close the Broadway site in 2003, with one of the reasons given being that it was a "large island of industry stranded in Sydney's central residential revival" that was happening in nearby Chippendale. In 2007, the site was sold and redeveloped into the Central Park precinct containing office blocks, shopping centre, a boutique hotel known as The Old Clare Hotel and the heritage brewery yard buildings underwent an extensive refurbishment.

In July 2004, Carlton & United Breweries changed its name to Carlton & United Beverages (retaining CUB acronym), citing the company's diversification into pre-mixed drinks, juices, ciders and non-alcoholic drinks.

In February 2009, Foster's announced the outcomes of a review of its global wine business, including the decision to separate the Australian Wine division from the Australian Beer, Cider & Spirits (BCS) division, and rename BCS to Carlton & United Breweries.

In mid-June 2016 CUB made the controversial decision to lay off 55 workers (mostly electricians and fitters) before inviting those same workers to reapply for their old jobs on individual contracts involving stripped conditions, clauses and significant pay cuts (the workers are suggesting a 65 per cent wage cut once penalty rates and other entitlements are factored in).

SABMiller, CUB's global owner, responded to criticisms from the union movement that its action was not illegal as it has no direct contractual relationship with the maintenance crews that were laid off. Rather, it has a contractual relationship with one subcontractor and the action constitutes the "passing" of a contract to another, which has the prerogative to set pay and conditions of workers at its own discretion. SABMiller have made no comment regarding the lower pay and poorer conditions offered to workers.

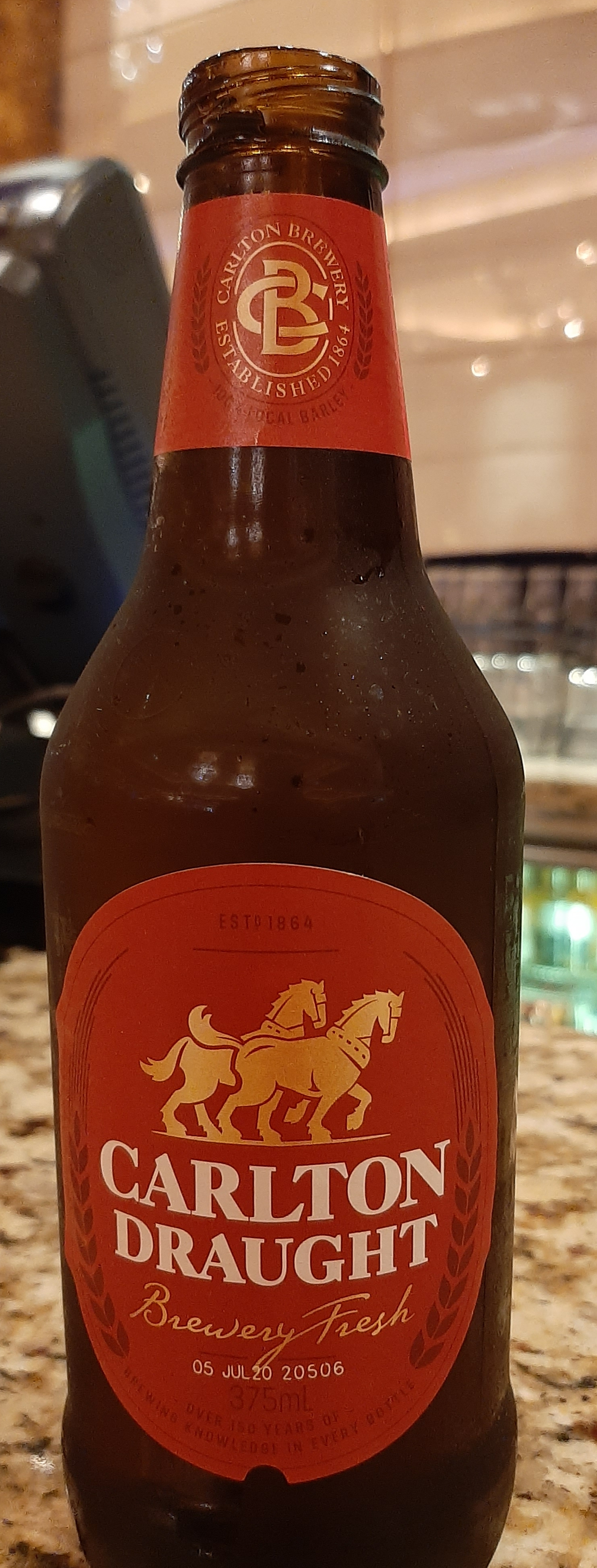
Carlton Draught (bottle 375mL)

The decision generated considerable poor publicity for CUB, with a widespread social media campaign as well as union efforts to highlight the workers' plight, who argue the brewer has conducted a "transmission of business" manoeuvre. Several pubs in Victoria have stopped selling CUB products in support of the sacked workers.

In July 2019, Asahi Breweries agreed terms to purchase Carlton & United Breweries with the transaction completed in May 2020 after being cleared by the Australian Competition & Consumer Commission and Foreign Investment Review Board.

== Carlton Premium Beverages ==
In 2020 Asahi Beverages has announced that it will combine its two alcohol businesses Carlton & United Breweries (CUB) and Asahi Premium Beverages to form Carlton Premium Beverages.

== Products ==
After the takeovers by SABMiller and then Anheuser-Busch InBev, CUB distributed their international brands such as Aguila, Corona Extra, Stella Artois, Beck's, Budweiser, Hoegaarden, Leffe and Leffe Radieuse.

=== Beer ===
Beer	Style	ABV	Hops etc.
4 Pines Brewing Co. Pale Ale	Ale	5.1%	35 IBU.
4 Pines Brewing Co. Pacific Ale	Ale	3.5%	15 IBU.
Abbotsford Invalid Stout	Stout	5.2%	
Abbots Lager	Lager	5.2%	
Alpha Pale Ale	Ale	5.2%	Cascade
Balter XPA	Ale	5.0%	30 IBU.
Balter Captain Sensible	Ale	3.5%	20 IBU.
Beez Neez	Wheat Braggot	4.7%	
Brookvale Union Ginger Beer	Ginger Beer	4.0%	Ginger Beer.
Carlton Black	Ale	4.4%	Pride of Ringwood
Carlton Cold	Lager	3.5%	Label changes colour when cold
Carlton Draught	Lager	4.6%	
Carlton Dry	Lager	4.5%	
Carlton Dry Peels	Lager	4.0%	Made with lime, not available.
Carlton Midstrength	Lager	3.0%	
Carlton Zero		0%	
Cascade Bitter	Lager	4.4%	
Cascade Draught	Lager	4.7%	
Cascade Pale Ale	Ale	5.0%	
Cascade Premium Light	Lager	2.4%	
Cascade Stout	Stout	5.8%	
Crown Golden Ale	Ale	4.5%	Galaxy
Crown Lager	Lager	4.9%	Pride of Ringwood
Dogbolter Dark Lager	Dunkel	5.2%	Hersbrucker
Fat Yak	Ale	4.7%	
Foster's Lager	Lager	4.9%	Pride of Ringwood
Foster's Light Ice	Lager	2.3%	
Great Northern Super Crisp	Lager	3.5%	
Green Beacon Brewing Co. 7 Bells Passion Fruit Sour	Gose	4.2%	
Lazy Yak	Ale	4.2%	
Melbourne Bitter	Lager	4.6%	Pride of Ringwood
Mountain Goat GOAT	Lager	4.2%	Galaxy and Ella hops, 22 IBU.
Mountain Goat IPA	Ale	6.5%	American style IPA, 70 IBU.
Power's Gold	Lager	3.0%	Discontinued.
Power's Ultra Smooth Lager	Lager	4.0%	
Pirate Life IPA	Ale	6.8%	
Pure Blonde Premium Mid	Lager	3.0%	
Pure Blonde Ultra Low Carb	Lager	4.2%	Hersbrucker
Redback	Wheat Beer	4.7%	Saaz and Pride of Ringwood
Resch's	Pilsener	4.4%	
Richmond Lager	Lager	4.4%	
Sheaf Stout	Stout	5.7%	originally by Tooth and Co.
VB Gold	Lager	3.5%	
Victoria Bitter	Lager	4.9%	
Wild Yak	Ale	4.2%	

=== Cider ===
Cider	ABV
Bulmers Original	4.7%
Bulmers Pear	4.7%
Dirty Granny	5.5%
Mercury Draught Cider	5.2%
Mercury Dry Cider	5.2%
Mercury Hard Cider Original	6.9%
Strongbow Original Apple	5.0%
Strongbow Dry Apple Cider	5.0%
Strongbow Lower Carb	5.0%
Strongbow Sweet Apple Cider	5.0%
Strongbow Rosé Apple Cider	5.0%

=== Spirits ===
Spirits	ABV
Akropolis Ouzo	37%
The Black Douglas	40%
Cougar Bourbon	37%
Mist Wood Gin	37%
Nikka Whisky	37%
Spicebox Whisky	37%
Tequila Blu	37%
Untold Spiced Rum	37%
Vodka Cruiser	37%
Vodka O	37%
Woodstock Bourbon	37%

== See also ==
- Australian beer
- List of breweries in Australia
