= Carlton Zero =

Australian beer

- Manufacturer: Carlton & United Breweries, a subsidiary of Asahi Breweries
- Introduced: August 2018; 6 years ago
- Alcohol by volume: 0.0%
- Style: No alcohol beer

Carlton Zero is an Australian no alcohol beer. It is brewed by Carlton & United Breweries (CUB), a subsidiary of Asahi Breweries.

Launched at the end of August 2018, Carlton Zero was CUB's first ever no alcohol beer. By September 2019, more than 3.2 million litres (700,000 imp gal; 850,000 US gal) of the brew had been sold in Australia.

== See also ==
- Australian pub
- Beer in Australia
- List of breweries in Australia
