= VB Gold =

Australian mid-strength lager introduced in 2007

- 375mL VB Gold Can
- Manufacturer: Carlton & United Beverages
- Origin: Australia
- Alcohol by volume: 3.0
- Style: Mid strength Australian lager

Victoria Bitter Gold is a mid strength Lager with an alcohol volume of 3.0% created in 2007 by Foster's. Originally branded as 'VB Midstrength Lager', Victoria Bitter Gold was created in order to capitalise on the growing market for mid strength beers, currently dominated by XXXX Gold. Victoria Bitter Gold rebranded from 'VB Mid strength' in 2009 and sells over one million cases every year and has grown strongly in popularity following its launch in late 2007. Originally brewed at 3.5% the alcohol volume has since been reduced to 3.0%.

TV builder Scott Cam, a self-confessed Victoria Bitter fan, is the appointed Victoria Bitter Mid Ambassador.

On 24 July 2007, The Australian reported that within three months of Fosters launching Victoria Bitter Gold, market shares for the full strength Victoria Bitter and Victoria Bitter Gold had increased. Foster's regional marketing director Anthony Heraghty hinted at further Victoria Bitter brand extensions, saying Foster's was "trying to see past the big green giant".

During the 2008 Rugby League World Cup, Victoria Bitter Gold was advertised on TV by Australian Rugby League legends Wally Lewis and Gorden Tallis.

== See also ==
- Australian pub
- Beer in Australia
- List of breweries in Australia
