= Abbotsford Invalid Stout =

Australian beer

Abbotsford Invalid Stout is a beer produced by Carlton & United Breweries, owned by the Japanese conglomerate Asahi Breweries. It was named 'Invalid Stout' in 1909 because it was believed it had a high iron content which would have medical benefits.

== See also ==
- Australian pub
- Beer in Australia
- List of breweries in Australia
