= Carlton Midstrength =

Australian beer

- Manufacturer: Carlton & United Beverages, a subsidiary of Asahi Breweries
- Alcohol by volume: 3.0%
- Style: Lager

Carlton Midstrength (or Carlton Mid) is an Australian lager, brewed by Carlton & United Beverages, a subsidiary a subsidiary of Asahi Breweries. The beer is currently one of the three mid-strength beers available, which is the second largest beer segment in Australia.

The alcohol content is 3.0%, and they are available in 375ml Bottles, 375ml Cans which are 0.9 standard drink and 750ml Bottle and they are 1.8 standard drink. Bittering hops and hop extracts are combined to give the hop-character like tastes in the drink.

== See also ==
- Australian pub
- Beer in Australia
- List of breweries in Australia
