= Trevor O'Hoy =

Trever O'Hoy was the president and CEO of Foster's Group from 2004 until 10 June 2008.

He was educated at Monash University, where he obtained a Bachelor of Economics in 1976. He has attended the Harvard Business School Advanced Management Program.

He joined Carlton & United Beverages in 1976 as a cadet executive, serving in numerous roles before being appointed managing director in 2002. After being appointed president and CEO of Foster's Group, he was voted Business Review Weekly's most admired new CEO.

O'Hoy also chairs the Fundraising Committee of Monash University.

== Latest News ==
Foster's Group chief executive Trevor O'Hoy resigned as the company announced an earnings downgrade and writedowns, saying it had paid too much for its wine assets.
