= Carlton Dry =

Australian beer brand

- Manufacturer: Carlton & United Beverages
- Origin: Australia
- Alcohol by volume: 4.5
- Style: Dry beer
- Website: https://www.carltondry.com.au/

Carlton Dry is an Australian beer brewed by Carlton & United Beverages, a subsidiary of Asahi Breweries. Carlton Dry was the second best selling beer in Australia in 2022.

== Marketing and promotion ==
When Carlton Dry took over the sponsorship of the Australian Independent Record Labels Association in 2013, the charts were renamed the Carlton Dry Independent Music Charts.

== Beers ==
=== Current production ===
Current Products
Beer	ABV
Carlton Dry	4.5%
Carlton Dry Hard Lager	6.5%
Carlton Dry Peels	4.6%
Carlton Dry Fusion	4.6%
Carlton Dry Fusion Black	4.6%
Carlton Dry Fusion Lemon	4.6%

- Carlton Dry: is a full-strength and lower-carb Australian lager.
- Carlton Dry Hard Lager:
- Carlton Dry Peels: is a lime-flavoured Dry beer.

== See also ==
- Australian pub
- Beer in Australia
- List of breweries in Australia
