= Michael Erceg =

New Zealand businessman

- Born: Michael Anthony Erceg; March 26, 1956; West Auckland, New Zealand
- Died: November 4, 2005 (aged 49)
- Education: University of California, Berkeley
- Occupation: Businessperson
- Known for: Founding Calypso Beverage Company Ltd (renamed Independent Liquor)

Michael Anthony Erceg (26 March 1956 – 4 November 2005) was a New Zealand businessman who founded Independent Liquor, which was New Zealand’s largest independently owned liquor distributor, known for its Ready to Drink (RTD) brands such as KGB, Woodstock and Vodka Cruisers.

At the time of his death in 2005, Erceg was one of the New Zealand's wealthiest individuals.

== Early life ==
Erceg was born in West Auckland to a Croatian winemaking family who operated Pacific vineyard in Te Atatū South. He had siblings Ivan and Vinka; his mother was Millie Erceg. He attended Kelston Boys High School. He was one of four children. Erceg was a top pupil, who skipped sixth form and was awarded Dux of Kelston Boys High School in 1972.

Erceg earned his PhD nine years later, from the University of California, Berkeley, and went on to teach math at the university level.

== Business career ==
=== Founding Independent Liquor (1987–2000) ===
Erceg soon returned to New Zealand to help with his ailing father's wine business in West Auckland. However, after a family disagreement over the direction of the wine company, Erceg left the company and formed Calypso Beverage Company Ltd in 1987. This business evolved to Independent Liquor.

Independent Liquor became New Zealand's largest independently owned liquor distributor, known for its ready to drink (RTD) brands such as KGB, Woodstock and Vodka Cruisers. Erceg relied upon alternative marketing strategies to combat the larger players in the New Zealand alcohol industry. He provided incentives to their retail customers that helped them increase their profit margins. The company opened production facilities in Australia in 1999, with plants in Sydney and Laverton. In late 2003, he was eighth on the National Business Review's rich list of New Zealanders, with wealth estimated at $300 million.

=== Expansion and sales (2001–2005) ===
In November 2005, his personal fortune was estimated at $600 million, making him the second richest man in Auckland. At the time, Independent Liquor had become the third largest liquor distributor in the country with a 65% market share for RTDs. Independent Liquor was also exporting its products to 70 countries.

After his death in 2005, Independent was put up for sale. Erceg's family oversaw the sale of Independent Distillers Group in December 2006 to CCMP Capital Asia and Pacific Equity Partners. The amount was undisclosed, but reported in the press to be for $864 million. The sale of Independent Liquor was approved by Erceg's widow in late 2006. At the time of the sale, Independent had 65% of the NZ market and 30% of the Australian market for RTD products, with brands including Woodstock Bourbon & Cola, Vodka Cruiser, Pulse and Purple Goanna, among others. Independent was sold to Asahi for $1.5 billion in 2011. In 2017, Independent Liquor was the largest "ready-to-drink" liquor company in New Zealand. On July 1, 2019, Independent Liquor (NZ) Ltd officially changed its name to Asahi Beverages (NZ) Ltd.

== Personal life and death ==
Erceg married Lynette (Lyn) Erceg later in his life. Lynette had a son, Matthew Pringle, from a previous relationship, whom Erceg treated as a stepson.

In his will, Erceg left $5 million to Pringle, alongside bequests to other family members and employees including $5 million to his sister Vinka, $2 million to his mother Millie, and $1 million each to five senior executives.

Following Erceg's death, Lynette Erceg became New Zealand's first female billionaire after selling Independent Liquor, with Forbes magazine estimating her fortune at $1.28 billion and ranking her 19th on its Australasian rich list.

By 2017, the Erceg family fortune was estimated at $1.65 billion, placing the family fifth on the National Business Review Rich List.

Lynette Erceg was also named as one of New Zealand's top 50 private landowners, holding 9,214 hectares of land including Lake Ohau Station in the Mackenzie Basin, in an analysis of Land Information New Zealand data published by RNZ and Stuff in 2019.

Matthew Pringle went on to lead Manuka Doctor and Honey New Zealand, becoming a prominent New Zealand businessman. In 2026, New Zealand media reported on his successful appeal against a costs order arising from family court proceedings in England involving Australian musician Olivia Nervo.

In November 2005, Erceg died in a helicopter accident. The helicopter he was piloting crashed near Raglan. Also killed was his passenger Guus Klatte, export director of Grolsch International. The wreckage was not found for two weeks. His [[Emergency position-indicating radiobeacon|ELT]] antenna on his Eurocopter EC120B was broken, so distress pings went unheard. According to Smithsonian Magazine, the ensuing search became one of the largest and most expensive search-and-rescue operations ever conducted in New Zealand. He and Klatte were said to have died on impact.

Two trusts he set up before his death, the Acorn Foundation and Independent Group Trust, both involving shares in his businesses, were later the subject of several legal battles involving beneficiaries. Their value was estimated at $1.2 billion in 2005 and 2006.

== See also ==
- Croatian New Zealanders
