= Matilda Bay Brewing Company =

Australian brewery company

- Location: Healesville, Victoria, Australia
- Opened: 1983
- Owner: Carlton & United Breweries; Phil Sexton
- Website: matildabay.com

Active beers
Name	Type
Redback	Wheat beer
Owl Original Ale	European Ale
Alpha Pale Ale	Pale Ale
Dogbolter	Dark Lager

The Matilda Bay Brewing Company is a brewery founded in Western Australia, the first new brewery opened in Australia since World War II, and Australia's first craft brewery. Originating from small batches brewed for the Sail and Anchor Hotel in 1984, their main brewery opened in 1989 in a prominent building at Stirling Highway previously occupied by Ford. The company was purchased by Carlton & United Breweries in the early 1990s.

== History ==
In 1983, Phil Sexton (a former brewer for the Swan Brewery), together with Garry Gosatti, John Tollis and Ron Groves, formed Brewtech Pty Ltd to brew commercial boutique beers. Due to lack of support from Perth hotels, the company purchased and renovated the Freemasons Hotel on South Terrace in Fremantle. The hotel was renovated, a micro brewery installed and renamed the Sail and Anchor, under the banner of Anchor Brewing Company. The first beer, Anchor Ale, "a dark, copper-coloured, traditional ale", was produced in late 1984.

In 1985, Brewtech opened its second venue, The Brewery Alehouse on Stirling Highway in Nedlands. The company also established a second microbrewery at 31 Carrington Street in Nedlands, which housed the Matilda Bay Brewing Company and began producing beers in 1985. In 1986, the company launched its first wheat beer, Redback, which went on to be one of the company's best commercial successes. In 1987, Brewtech Pty Ltd changed its name to Brewtech Limited, following which it made the decision to consolidate its business under the Matilda Bay Brewing Company banner. The company purchased another three outlets in Perth, including the Queens Hotel in Highgate and the Brass Monkey in Northbridge.

In 1988, Carlton & United Breweries purchased a 20% shareholding in the Matilda Bay Brewing Company, which led to the company in 1989 purchasing larger premises, the former Ford Motor Company building on Stirling Highway in North Fremantle, to brew its beers. In 1990, Elders IXL, which was renamed the Foster's Group, purchased the Matilda Bay Brewing Company in a deal that valued Matilda Bay at more than A$50 million. Carlton & United then sold the Sail and Anchor Hotel to the Australian Leisure & Hospitality Group, which subsequently closed the microbrewery operations at the hotel.

In 2000, the original brewers of Matilda Bay opened the Little Creatures microbrewery in Fremantle.

In 2005, the Matilda Bay Garage Brewery began operating in Dandenong South in Victoria in an effort to brew small batches of more experimental beers, such as Alpha Pale Ale, Dogbolter, Crema, Barking Duck, and Rooftop Red Lager.

In June 2007, Foster's announced the Perth-based brewery would close in September and its beer production would be moved to its other breweries to improve cost and capital efficiency, with most of the larger volume production beers, such as Redback, Beez Neez, Fat Yak, and Bohemian Pilsner, being moved to the Cascade Brewery in Hobart.

MB21 Bottle

In 2012, the company opened the Matilda Bay Brewery Bar in the former Cadbury factory building in Port Melbourne, relocating its brewery operations from Dandenong. The Brewery Bar was closed in 2014 with production of Matilda Bay beers moved to the Cascade Brewery in Hobart.

In 2019, Carlton & United Breweries and original founder Phil Sexton went into partnership to re-establish the brand, with a new brewery built in the Yarra Valley. The Yak beers were disconnected from the Matilda Bay brand and are brewed in Carlton & United Breweries facilities across the country, with Matilda Bay Brewing Company brewing a new range of beers out of its Yarra Valley brewery.

== Beers ==
=== Current ===
- Alpha Pale Ale, a North American style pale ale (5.2% alc/vol). In 2003, it won more awards than any other beer at the Australian International Beer Awards.
- Redback, a German style hefeweizen or wheat beer (4.7% alc/vol), named after the infamous Australian spider. Originally released in 1986 as a seasonal beer called Summer Wheat, it was renamed in 1987 and released nationwide. In 1993, it was awarded grand champion at the Australian International Beer Awards (AIBA).
- Dogbolter, a Munich style dark lager (5.2% alc/vol). First released in 1987.
- Owl Original Ale, a European style golden ale (4.2% alc/vol).

=== Past ===
- Bohemian Pilsner, a Czech-style pilsner (4.7% alc/vol).
- Beez Neez, a specialty honey-infused wheat beer (4.7% alc/vol). Often changes yearly due to honey supplies and varieties available.
- Rooftop Red Lager, made using red crystal malts.
- Big Helga, a Munich style lager (helles) (4.7% alc/vol).
- Brewers' Reserve Alpha Pale Ale, an American style Pale Ale.
- Brewers' Reserve Dogbolter, a dark lager.
- MB21, a strong, dark, unfiltered wheat beer. MB21 is not available for sale, or public ownership. Bottle size is 750 ml (25 US fl oz), with a directly printed label design and a large, heavy red wax seal. At last count, all production units of MB21 were accounted for.
- Fat Yak, an American style pale ale (4.7% alc/vol).
- Wild Yak, Pacific Ale (4.2% alc/vol). Subtle aromas of south seas yak.
- Matilda Bay I.G.P. (Itchy Green Pants), a cloudy Australian pale ale (4.7% alc/vol).
- Minimum Chips Handcut Golden Lager, a golden lager (4.7% alc/vol)
- The Ducks, an Australian pale ale (4.2% alc/vol)
