= Carlton Cold =

Australian beer

- Manufacturer: Carlton & United Beverages, a subsidiary of Asahi Breweries
- Alcohol by volume: 3.5%
- Style: Lager

Carlton Cold is an Australian beer brewed by Carlton & United Beverages, a subsidiary of Asahi Breweries.

Launched in 1993, the original alcohol level for the drink was 4.9%. However, in 2009 it was dropped to 4.0% and in 2013 it was dropped down to 3.5%. Carlton Cold is available in 355 mL bottles and 375 mL cans.

== See also ==
- Beer in Australia
- List of breweries in Australia
