= Carlton Black =

Australian beer

- Manufacturer: Carlton & United Beverages, a subsidiary of Asahi Breweries
- Alcohol by volume: 4.5%
- Style: Dark ale

Carlton Black is a traditional top fermented dark ale using old style yeast.

Carlton Black is brewed by Carlton & United Beverages, a subsidiary of Asahi Breweries. Known for its ruby tint and robust, yet balanced flavor profile, it features a blend of pale and roasted barley malts that create a smooth, full-bodied taste. The addition of Pride of Ringwood hops adds a subtle bitterness, which, combined with the malty sweetness, offers an inviting mocha aroma and easy drinkability at 4.4% ABV. This ale is crafted using traditional brewing methods.

== See also ==
- Australian pub
- Beer in Australia
- List of breweries in Australia
