= Pot glass =

Glassware used for drinking beer in Australia

A pot glass is a kind of glassware used for drinking beer in Australia. The size of a pot glass is 285mL (approximately ^{1}/_{2} Imperial pint). Within various states of Australia, a 285mL glass is also known as a middy, or in South Australia as a schooner, however, anywhere else in Australia, a schooner is considered a 425mL glass.

== See also ==
- Australian beer § Beer glasses.
- Australian English vocabulary § Alcohol
