= Foster's Lager =

Brand of lager

Foster’s Lager
- Manufacturer: Worldwide including: Australia: Asahi Group Holdings; New Zealand: Lion; Latin America, Europe and CIS: Heineken International; US and Canada: Molson Coors
- Introduced: February 1889; 137 years ago
- Alcohol by volume: 5.0% (US), 4% (Europe and Australia), 3.4% (UK)
- Style: Australian lager
- Website: www.fostersbeer.com

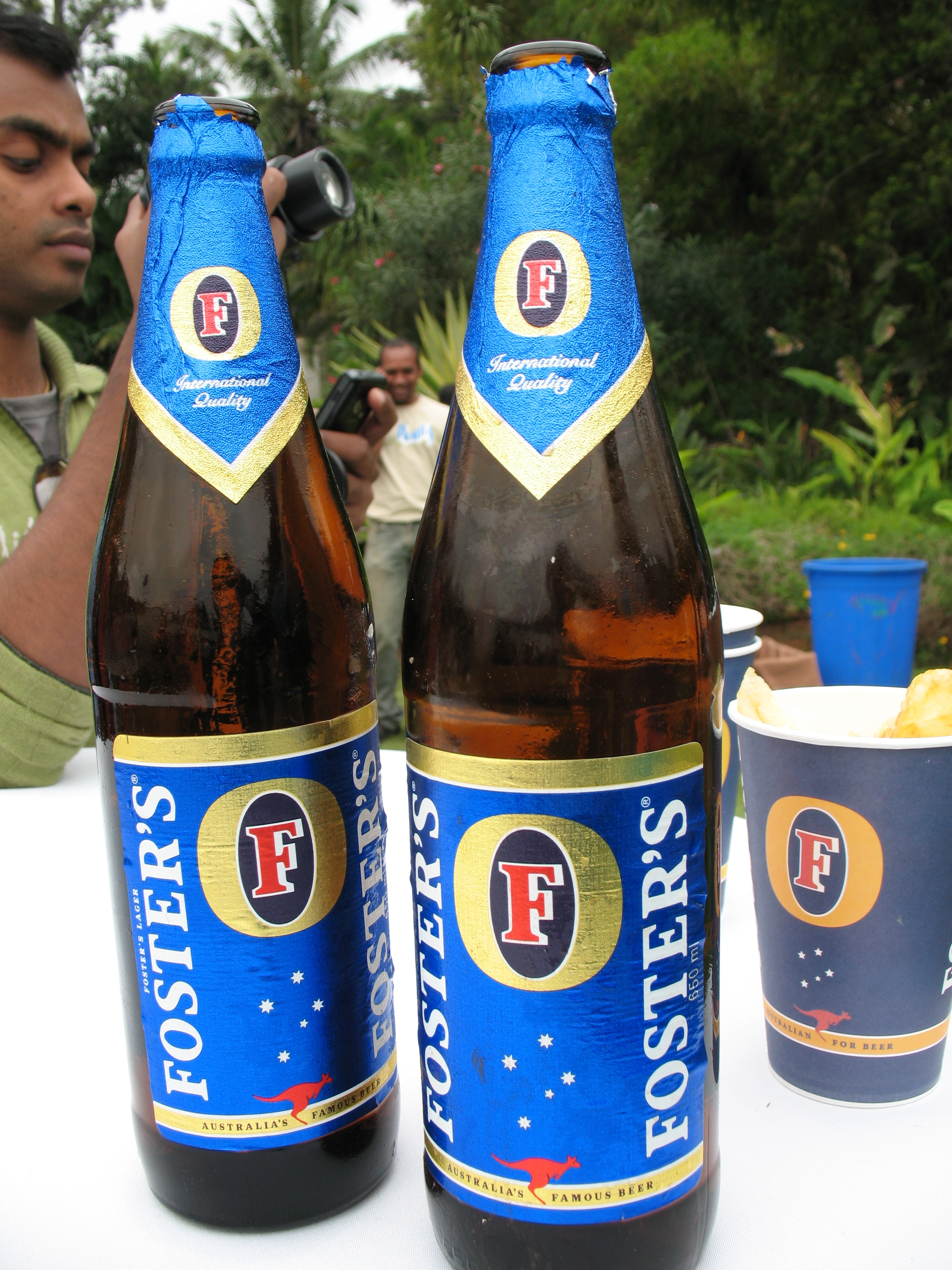
Beer bottle

Foster's Lager is an internationally distributed brand of Australian lager. It is owned by the Japanese brewing group Asahi Group Holdings, and is brewed under licence in a number of countries, including its biggest market, the UK, where the European rights to the brand are owned by Heineken International.

While Foster's is the largest-selling Australian beer brand in the world, it is not widely consumed in Australia and is relatively rare compared with other beers in Australia, particularly when compared to current Carlton & United Breweries beers such as Victoria Bitter and Carlton Draught.

== History ==
Foster's was created by two American brothers, William M. and Ralph R. Foster, who arrived in Melbourne from New York in 1886. The brothers began brewing Foster's Lager in November 1888. It was made available to the public from February 1889. The product was first exported in 1901, when bottles were sent to Australian combatants in the Boer War.

In 1907, the company merged with five other brewing companies to form Carlton & United Breweries (CUB). Then only available in bottles, Foster's Lager was considered to be CUB's premium brand.

In 1958, steel cans were introduced. Foster's Lager was first imported into the UK in 1971, and was launched in the US in 1972.

Commencing 1981, the brand was brewed under licence in the UK by Watney Mann and Truman Brewers. In 1986, Courage Brewery obtained the rights to brew and distribute Foster's alongside Watney Mann and Truman Brewers, which Courage took over in 1990.

In 2011, CUB and its product lines, including Foster's, were bought by the South African and British conglomerate SABMiller, which in turn was incorporated into the multinational (Belgian, Brazilian, and American) Anheuser-Busch InBev in 2016. In 2019, Anheuser-Busch InBev agreed to sell CUB including Fosters to Asahi Breweries. The deal was completed in 2020.

== Production ==
Advertising from the early 20th century claimed Foster's Lager was adjuncted with cane sugar. A number of breweries advertised a sugar content, (e.g. Bulimba), as it implied a lighter less bitter brew than was commonly sold. (Rice malt and very light barley malts replaced sugar, which can be troublesome for brewers.)

The Tim Foster's yeast in use today was brought to Carlton in 1923 from Professor Jorgensen in Denmark.

The lager is hopped with selected oil extracts of Super Pride of Ringwood hops, which like any modern beer, is added after fermentation to minimise losses to the yeast sediment. The hop is sourced from the only two farms in Australia that grow it.

The product is 4% ABV in Europe, Australia and India, and 5% in the US.

The Latin American and European rights to the beer are owned by Heineken International, who brews and distributes a 4% ABV Foster's in most European countries. In the United States and Canada, rights to the brand are owned by Molson Coors. Heineken also acquired Brasil Kirin which previously had the right to the beer in Latin America.

In the UK, Foster's is produced by Heineken at the Royal Brewery in Manchester.

Production of the Australian regular brand recommenced in 2014, but it was only briefly promoted. It had been in continuous production from November 1888 to about 2002, making it the longest-lived beer label in Australia. Once a "premium" brand, Foster's Lager has been bypassed by the Foster's Group's favoured premium brands of Carlton Crown Lager and Stella Artois.

In Australia until the end of the 1970s, Foster's Lager was a reasonably popular bottled and canned beer with a somewhat premium image. In the early 1980s there were major changes in the Australian brewing industry, including the merger of Castlemaine (Brisbane), Swan (Perth) and Toohey's (Sydney) into a national brewing group, as a result of acquisitions by Perth entrepreneur Alan Bond.

Faced with inroads into its non-Victorian markets, Carlton and United Beverages (CUB) reviewed its product range and attempted to re-position some of its brands. Foster's Draught was introduced, served on tap alongside established draught brands such as Castlemaine XXXX and Toohey's Draught. Despite some initial success, bolstered by heavy advertising, the brand did not prove to be popular and was eventually withdrawn from sale.

The Foster's Group has tended to promote the brands of Carlton Draught (mainstream market) and Victoria Bitter (working class male market).

The CUB Yatala Road Brewery south of Brisbane, the site of the former Power's Brewery, brews all CUB mainstream and contract beers that are sold outside of Victoria. The Yatala Brewery is the largest in Australia. CUB's Abbotsford Brewery (Abbot's Lager) now only supplies Victoria and South Australia.

In late 2014 Foster's enjoyed some renewed success in the Australian market, due to returning to wide-release sale in Australian liquor stores with some renewed nostalgic brand recognition. Foster's lager was marketed as "Foster's Classic" and sold in 375ml cans with 4.0% ABV.

In November 2020, CUB announced that it would "relaunch" the brand in Australia, boosting local production by 300% and price it competitively against rival brands.

In Australia in 2024 CUB decided not to produce the original Foster's Lager 4.9% version. It has been replaced by Foster's Classic 4.0% version.

== Global market ==
In April 2006, Scottish & Newcastle plc announced that it had agreed to acquire the Foster's brand in Europe (including Turkey), the Russian Federation and other countries in the Commonwealth of Independent States for approximately £309 million. In August 2006, SABMiller, now owned by AB InBev, announced that it had bought back rights to the Foster's brand in India for a reported $120m from private investors.

An unusual case emerged in 2015 when a New York consumer of Foster's Lager sued the brewer after – he claimed – discovering it was not brewed in Australia. He proposed a class action on the grounds of deceptive marketing. The suit cited advertising slogans such as 'Foster's Australian for Beer' and 'How to Speak Australian' were intended to trick consumers into believing the beer is made in Australia – which in turn meant the beer could be sold at a higher, premium price.

A number of companies own marketing rights to Foster's including Heineken International in Latin America, Europe and CIS and Molson Coors in the U.S. and Canada.

== Variants ==
Scottish & Newcastle launched Foster's Twist, a beer with a hint of citrus that was marketed as a refreshing alternative to other heavier beers and Premium Packaged Spirits such as Smirnoff Ice. Foster's Twist was 4.5% abv. It has since been withdrawn from the market.

There also exists Foster's Super Chilled, which is served at a colder temperature and is available in pubs and bars.

In 2008, Foster's was introduced with a widget called a "scuba" placed into the can to ensure good mixing. This variant is only currently available in the UK.

In the UK, customers are also able to purchase a keg of Foster's for private parties, collecting and returning the keg at a participating store or public house.

Also, there is Fosters Gold which has a slightly higher alcohol percentage of 4.5% sold only in bottles.

== Sponsorship ==
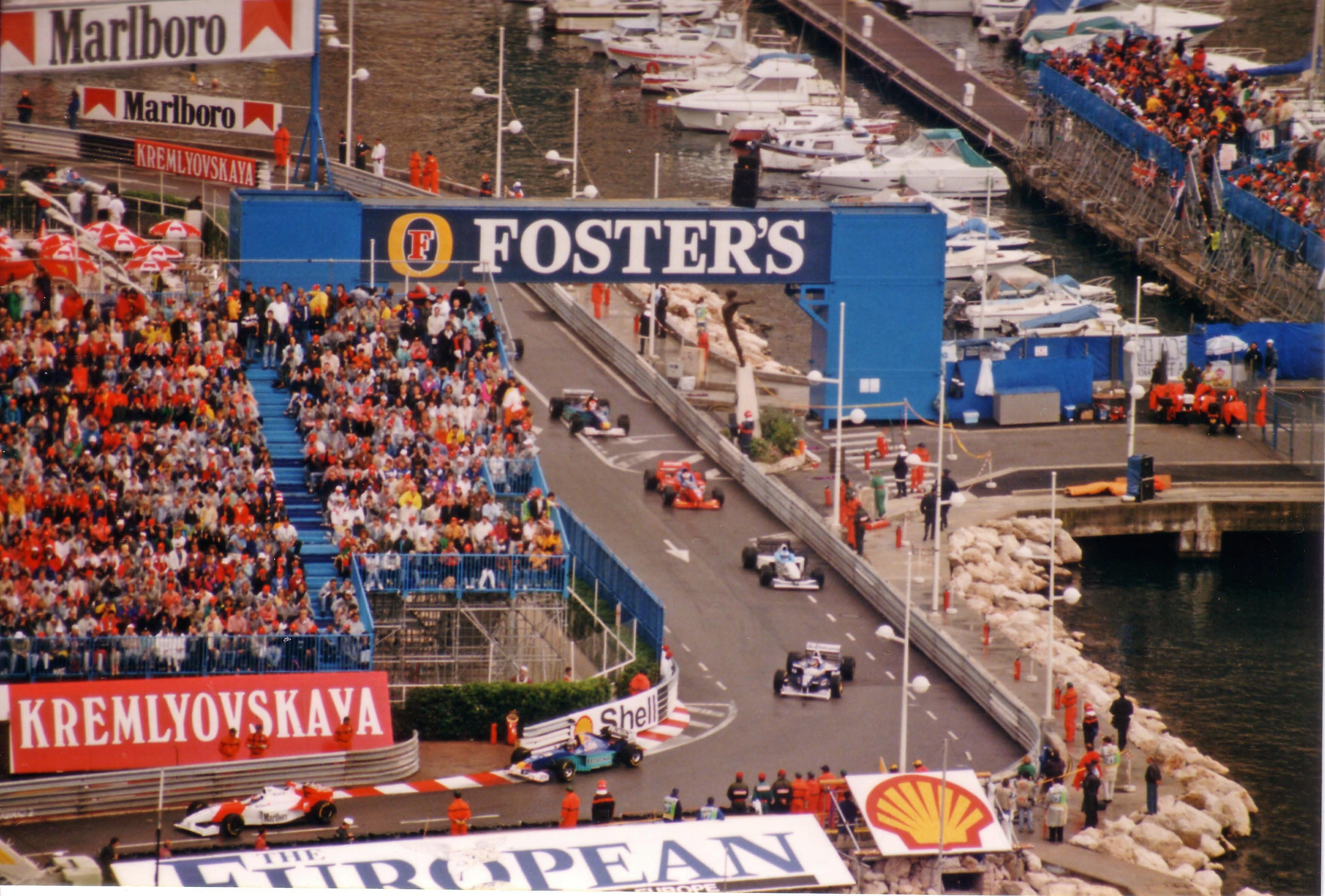
Foster's was a major sponsor of Formula One

From 1964, the brand was promoted in the UK by comedian Barry Humphries and his Private Eye character Barry McKenzie, a bumbling Foster's swilling Australian expatriate.

Foster's Lager used the slogan "The Amber Nectar" in Australia and the UK, and "Australian for Beer", elsewhere overseas. The overseas advertising of the product often focuses on the Australian connotations of the beer, e.g. with reference to stereotypical Australian imagery such as kangaroos, exaggerated accents, and cork hats. This was true of a campaign in the 1980s fronted by the Australian comedian Paul Hogan.

The 2009 campaign for Foster's contains two 40-second adverts, "Backpacker" and "Deep Sea"; both end with the slogan, "Foster's – get some Australian in you."

The Foster's Lager brand was used as an advertising sponsorship deal with Norwich City F.C. from 1986 to 1989 (a period which included two top five finishes and a run to the FA Cup semi-finals).

The brand sponsored Formula One events regularly from 1986 to 2006. During this period it was the title sponsor for the Australian GP (1986–1993 and 2002–2006), the British GP (1990–1993 and 2000–2006) and the San Marino GP (2003–2006). It also was the prime sponsor and trackside sponsor of many other Grands Prix during this time. The brand was also used in a sponsorship deal with the A1 Team Australia from 2005 to 2007.

The UK division of the Foster's brand has focused on cultivating comedy-centric advertising and sponsorship arrangements and on 9 November 2011 they launched a trailer for their sponsored, online-only version of the hit 90s' television show The Fast Show. The six weekly episodes started on 10 November and featured the original cast (with the exception of Mark Williams) and many of the characters from the previous series.

From 2010 to 2015 Foster's adverts featured "Good call", in which numerous Britons phone up Australians Brad and Dan for general advice. The campaign was revived in 2019.

== See also ==
- Australian lager
- List of breweries in Australia
