= HMAS Ballarat (FFH 155) =

Anzac-class frigate of Royal Australian Navy

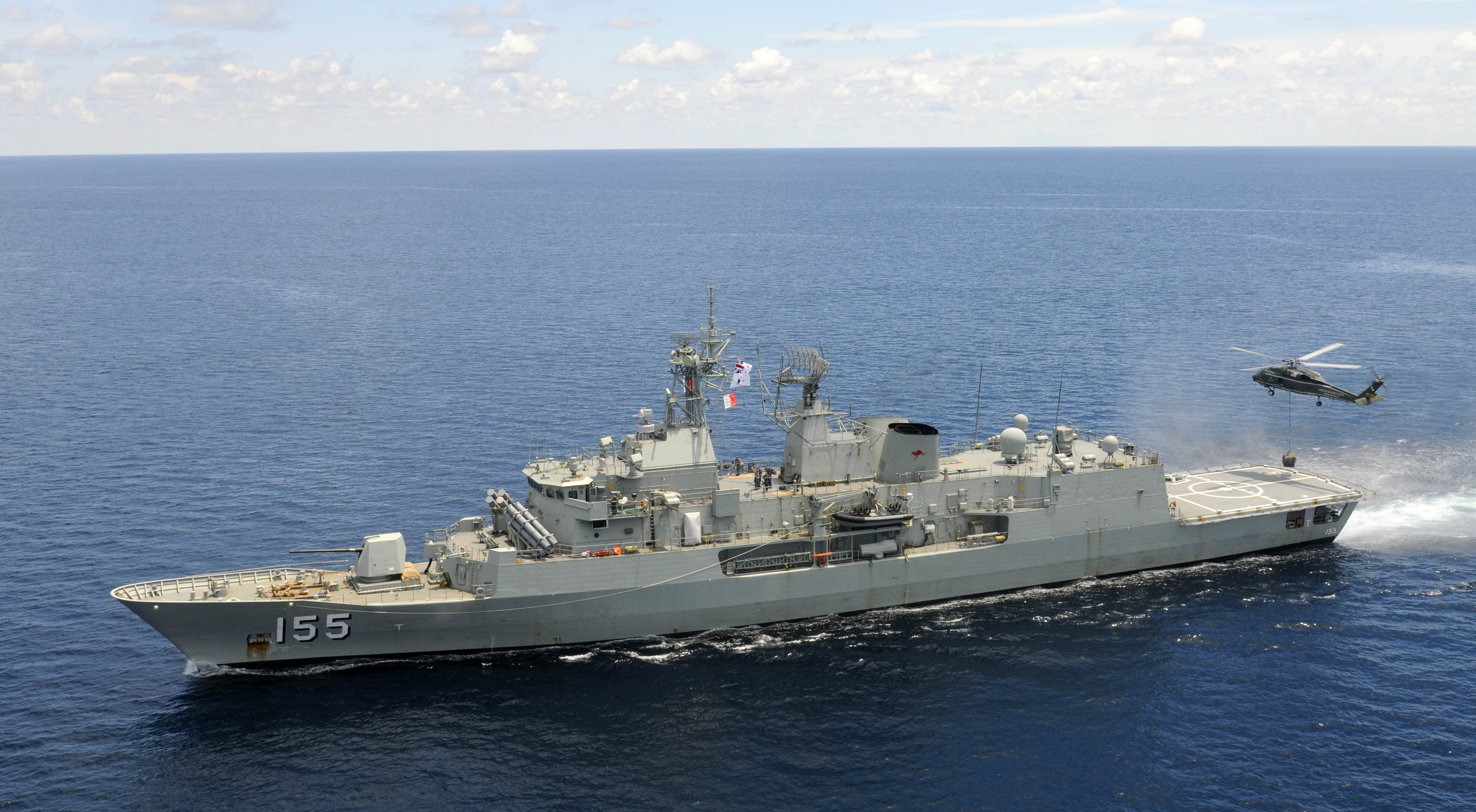
- HMAS Ballarat with a US Navy helicopter in 2012

History

Australia
- Namesake: City of Ballarat
- Builder: Tenix Defence
- Laid down: 4 August 2000
- Launched: 25 May 2002
- Commissioned: 26 June 2004
- Home port: Fleet Base West, Perth
- Identification: MMSI number: 503114000
- Motto: "Defend the Flag"
- Honours and awards: Three inherited battle honours
- Status: Active as of 2021
- Badge

General characteristics
- Class & type: Anzac-class frigate
- Displacement: 3,810 tonnes full load
- Length: 118 m (387 ft)
- Beam: 15 m (49 ft)
- Draught: 4 m (13 ft)
- Propulsion: 1 × General Electric LM 2500 gas turbine providing 30,000 hp (22.5 mW); 2 × MTU 12v 1163 TB83 diesels providing 8,840 hp (6.5 mW)
- Speed: 27 knots (50 km/h; 31 mph)
- Range: 6,000 nautical miles (11,000 km; 6,900 mi) at 18 knots (33 km/h; 21 mph)
- Complement: approximately 22 Officers and 160 sailors
- Sensors & processing systems: Sonars: Thomson Sintra Spherion B Mod 5; hull-mounted; active search and attack; medium frequency. Provision for towed array; Long-Range Air search radar: CEA Technologies CEAFAR2-L L-band Active Phased Array; Search radar: CEA Technologies CEAFAR1-S S-band Active Phased Array Radar; Navigation: Kelvin Hughes Sharpeye (I-band); Passive Detection: Sagem Vampir NG Infrared Search/track; Target Illumination Radar: CEA Technologies CEAMOUNT Active Phased Array Illuminator (X Band); Combat data systems: Saab 9LV 453 Mk 3E.Link 11& Link16; Weapons control: Saab 9LV 453 radar/optronic director with CEA Solid State Continuous Wave Illuminator
- Electronic warfare & decoys: ESM: Racal modified Sceptre A (radar intercept), Telefunken PST-1720 Telegon 10 (comms intercept); Countermeasures: Decoys: G & D Aircraft SRBOC Mk 36 Mod 1 decoy launchers for SRBOC, BAE Systems Nulka active missile decoy
- Armament: Guns: 1 × 5 in/54 (127 mm) Mk 45 Mod 2 gun, 2 × Rafael Mini Typhoon 12.7mm (.50 cal) CIWS, small arms; Missiles: 2 × 4 Naval Strike Missile anti-ship/land-attack missiles, 8-cell Mk 41 Mod 5 VLS for up to 32 RIM-162 ESSM; Torpedoes: 2 × triple 324 mm Mk 32 Mod 5 tubes with MU 90 Torpedo
- Aircraft carried: 1 × Sikorsky MH-60R Seahawk
- Notes: Post-Anti-Ship Missile Defence Project upgrade. See class article for original configuration.

HMAS Ballarat (FFH 155) is an Anzac-class frigate of the Royal Australian Navy (RAN). The frigate was laid down in 2000 and commissioned into the RAN in mid-2004. Since entering service, Ballarat has been involved in border protection as part of Operation Relex II, was deployed to the Gulf for Operation Catalyst, and was one of the two ships involved in the Operation Northern Trident 2009 round-the-world voyage. Ballarat has undergone the Anti-Ship Missile Defence (ASMD) upgrade, completing in 2015.

== Design and construction ==
The Anzac class originated from RAN plans to replace the six River-class destroyer escorts with a mid-capability patrol frigate. The Australian shipbuilding industry was thought to be incapable of warship design, so the RAN decided to take a proven foreign design and modify it. Around the same time, the Royal New Zealand Navy (RNZN) was looking to replace four Leander-class frigates; a deterioration in New Zealand-United States relations, the need to improve alliances with nearby nations, and the commonalities between the RAN and RNZN ships' requirements led the two nations to begin collaborating on the acquisition in 1987. Tenders were requested by the Anzac Ship Project at the end of 1986, with 12 ship designs (including an airship) submitted. By August 1987, the tenders were narrowed down in October to Blohm + Voss's MEKO 200 design, the M class (later Karel Doorman class) offered by Royal Schelde, and a scaled-down Type 23 frigate proposed by Yarrow Shipbuilders. In 1989, the Australian government announced that Melbourne-based shipbuilder AMECON (which became Tenix Defence) would build the modified MEKO 200 design. The Australians ordered eight ships, while New Zealand ordered two, with an unexercised option for two more.

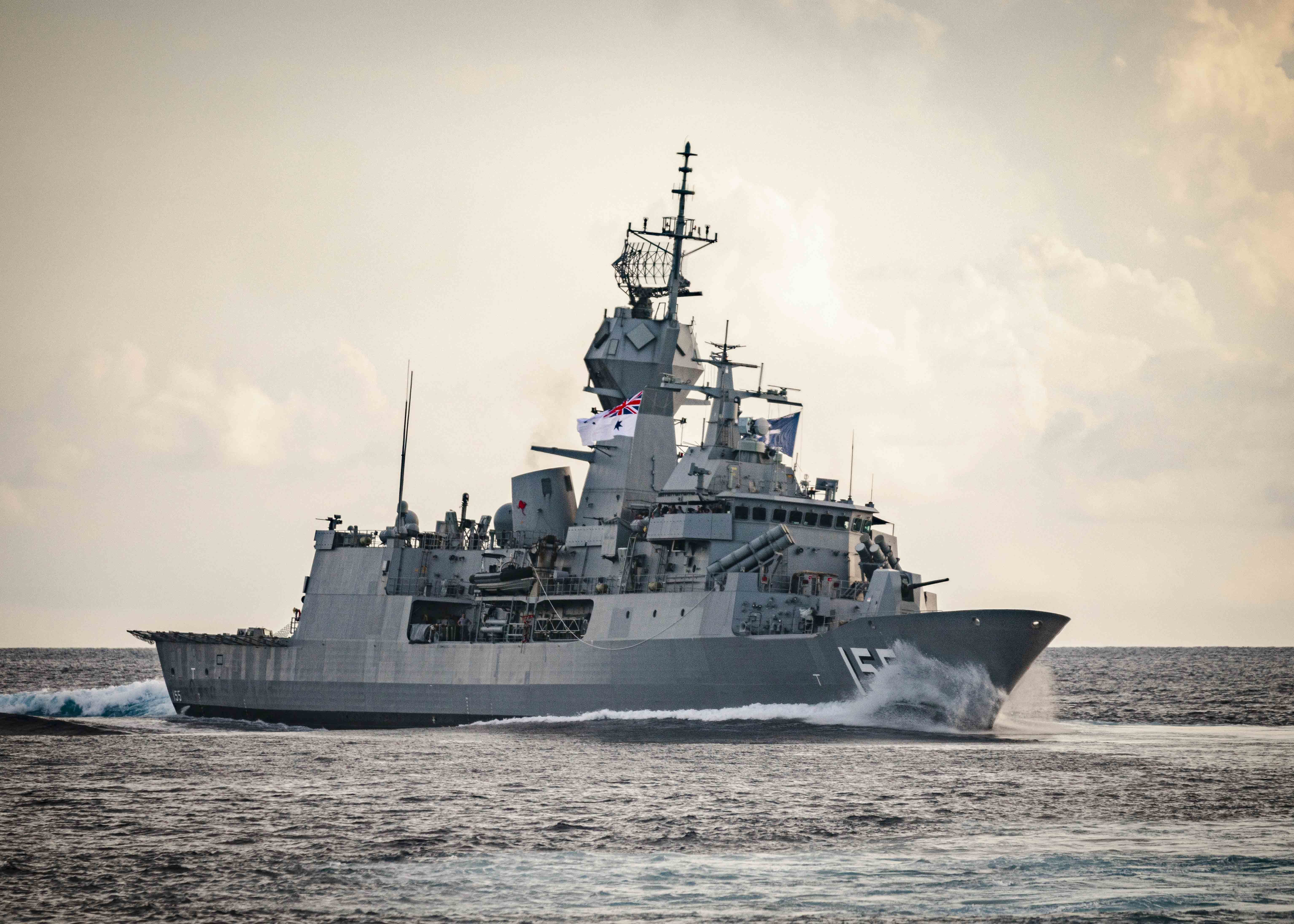
Bow view of Ballarat in 2020

The Anzacs are based on Blohm + Voss' MEKO 200 PN (or Vasco da Gama-class) frigates, modified to meet Australian and New Zealand specifications and maximise the use of locally built equipment. Each frigate has a 3,600-tonne (3,500-long-ton; 4,000-short-ton) full load displacement. The ships are 109 metres (358 ft) long at the waterline, and 118 metres (387 ft) long overall, with a beam of 14.8 metres (49 ft), and a full load draught of 4.35 metres (14.3 ft). A Combined Diesel or Gas (CODOG) propulsion machinery layout is used, with a single, 30,172-horsepower (22,499 kW) General Electric LM2500-30 gas turbine and two 8,840-horsepower (6,590 kW) MTU 12V1163 TB83 diesel engines driving the ship's two controllable-pitch propellers. Maximum speed is 27 knots (50 km/h; 31 mph), and maximum range is over 6,000 nautical miles (11,000 km; 6,900 mi) at 18 knots (33 km/h; 21 mph); about 50% greater than other MEKO 200 designs. The standard ship's company of an Anzac consists of 22 officers and 141 sailors.

As designed, the main armament for the frigate is a 5-inch 54 calibre Mark 45 gun, supplemented by an eight-cell Mark 41 vertical launch system (for RIM-7 Sea Sparrow or RIM-162 Evolved Sea Sparrow missiles), two 12.7-millimetre (0.50 in) machine guns, and two Mark 32 triple torpedo tube sets (initially firing Mark 46 torpedoes, but later upgraded to use the MU90 Impact torpedo). They were also designed for but not with a Mark 15 Phalanx close-in weapons system (two Mini Typhoons fitted when required from 2005 onwards). Two quad-canister Harpoon anti-ship missile launchers (which were installed across the RAN vessels from 2005 onwards) were previously fitted, but were replaced by two quad-canister Naval Strike Missile launchers in 2025. A second 8-cell Mark 41 VLS was also fitted for but not with. The Australian Anzacs used a single Sikorsky S-70B-2 Seahawk helicopter; plans to replace them with Kaman SH-2G Super Seasprites were cancelled in 2008 due to ongoing problems. Instead, the S-70B-2 was replaced with the Sikorsky MH-60R Seahawk by late 2017.

Ballarat was laid down at Williamstown, Victoria on 4 August 2000. The ship was assembled from six hull modules and six superstructure modules; the superstructure modules were fabricated in Whangarei, New Zealand, and hull modules were built at both Williamstown and Newcastle, New South Wales, with final integration at Williamstown. She was launched on 25 May 2002, and commissioned into the RAN on 26 June 2004. She was the eighth ship of the class to be constructed, and the sixth to enter service in the Royal Australian Navy. The motto and badge of HMAS Ballarat are references to the events of the Eureka Stockade, which occurred at Ballarat in 1854.

== Operational history ==
At the start of 2005, Ballarat was involved in Operation Relex II, a border protection operation in Australia's northern waters. Ballarat ran aground off Christmas Island near Flying Fish Cove on 22 January 2005 causing damage to the rudder and propellers from the sand and coral. There were no injuries to the crew.

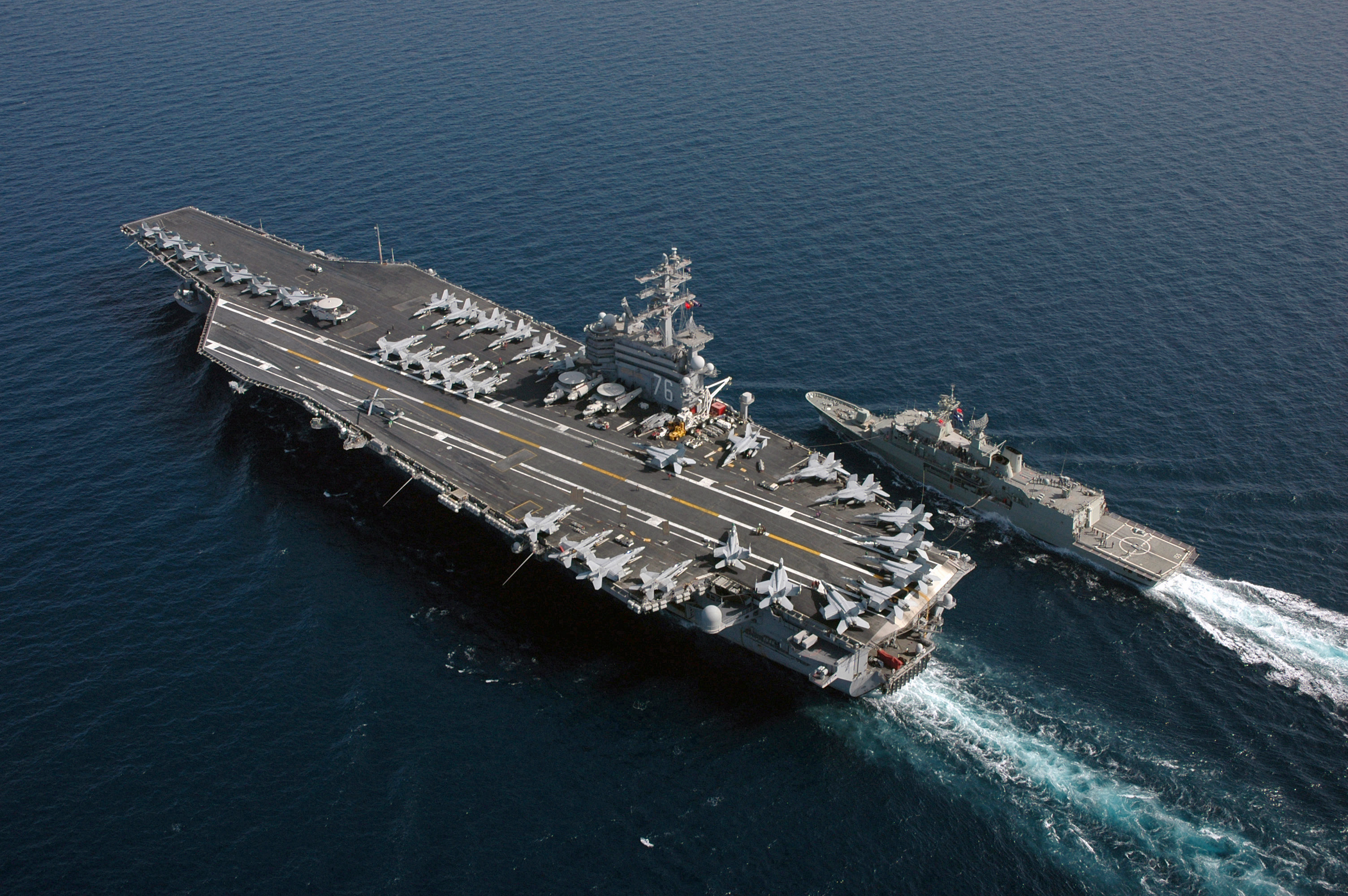
Ballarat refuelling from USS Ronald Reagan on 21 April 2006

In March 2006, Ballarat was deployed to the Persian Gulf to relieve HMAS Parramatta as part of Operation Catalyst, the Australian Defence Force's contribution to the rehabilitation and reconstruction of Iraq.

In December 2006 a request by members of the ship's company led to a re-launching of Ballarat Bitter, a beer originally brewed in Ballarat but stopped in 1989. Proceeds from the sale of the two limited releases were donated to the United Way charities. The brand's mascot, Ballarat Bertie, has been adopted by the ship as a mascot.

On the morning of 13 March 2009, Ballarat was one of seventeen warships involved in a ceremonial fleet entry and fleet review in Sydney Harbour, the largest collection of RAN ships since the Australian Bicentenary in 1988. The frigate was one of the thirteen ships involved in the ceremonial entry through Sydney Heads, and anchored in the harbour for the review.

On 20 April 2009, Ballarat and the Adelaide-class frigate HMAS Sydney departed from Sydney as part of Operation Northern Trident, a six-month round-the-world voyage by the two vessels, with numerous diplomatic visits and joint exercises with foreign navies. During the night of 17 May, Ballarat and Sydney provided aid to two merchant vessels in the Gulf of Aden, driving off two separate groups of Somali pirates attacking the ships. Ballarat escorted an impromptu convoy of eight ships, including the two that were attacked, to safety, while Sydney remained in the area to report the incidents to Combined Task Force 151.

Ballarat completed the Anti-Ship Missile Defence (ASMD) upgrade in September 2015. The upgrade included the fitting of CEA Technologies' CEAFAR and CEAMOUNT phased array radars on new masts, a Vampir NG Infrared Search and Track system, and Sharpeye Navigational Radar Systems, along with improvements to the operations room equipment and layout.

In September 2018, Ballarat sailed at short notice to participate in the rescue of two round-the-world sailors in the southern Indian Ocean. The ship transported one of them back to Australia from Île Amsterdam after he was rescued by a French fishing boat.

In April 2021, Ballarat took part in the search for the missing Indonesian Navy submarine KRI Nanggala (402). The next month the ship participated in efforts to enforce sanctions against North Korea as part of Operation Argos.

Between 10 and 18 November, Ballarat participated in the 2025 edition of Exercise Malabar along with JS Hyūga, INS Sahyadri and USS Fitzgerald of the Japanese Navy, Indian Navy and US Navy. The ship, with a crew of 177 sailors and officers, was equipped with an integral MH-60R Romeo helicopter and supported by a P-8A Poseidon aircraft of the Air Force which was deployed from the Andersen Air Force Base. The exercise included complex drills in anti-submarine warfare, air defence and replenishment at sea. The harbour phase was conducted on 10–12 November at Naval Base Guam followed by the Sea Phase on 13–17 November in the west Pacific training area.
