= Great Northern Brewing Co. =

Brewing company in Yatala, Queensland, Australia

- Type: Beer
- Manufacturer: Carlton & United Breweries (Asahi Breweries)
- Origin: Yatala, Queensland, Australia
- Alcohol by volume: 4.2%
- Style: Lager
- Website: www.greatnorthern.com.au

The Great Northern Brewing Co., commonly known as Great Northern, is a brand of full and a mid-strength Australian lager owned by Carlton & United Breweries (CUB), and brewed in Queensland at the CUB Yatala Brewery. It comes in 330mL "stubbies", 375mL "tinnies" and 700mL "tallies" (ie. tall bottles) at 3.5% Abv or 4.2% Abv.

== Overview ==
In 2010 Carlton United Breweries (CUB), announced the launch of a new brewery Great Northern Brewing Co. Great Northern is styled on 'Cairns Draught', a product first brewed in 1924 by Auguste Joseph François de Bavay, whose studies of sewage contamination in drinking water helped end diseases such as typhoid. Both brands feature a marlin character in their logo and package designs.

In the bottles the full strength 'original' style beers are identifiable by the gold-coloured bottle top and a white-coloured marlin fish on its label whereas the mid strength has a silver-coloured bottle cap with a black marlin on the label.

It was recently (2021), (2022), (2023), (2024) and (2025) the best selling beer in Australia.

== See also ==
- Australian pub
- Beer in Australia
- List of breweries in Australia
