= HMAS Ballarat =

HMT Ballarat, built for P&O in 1911 to expand its Blue Anchor Line subsidiary. Requisitioned as a troopship in the First World War. On 25 April 1917 a German submarine torpedoed her in the English Channel. All her passengers and crew were rescued and she was taken in tow, but she sank the next day.

Two ships of the Royal Australian Navy have been named HMAS Ballarat, for the city of Ballarat, Victoria.

- HMAS Ballarat (J184), a Bathurst-class corvette serving from 1940 to 1947
- HMAS Ballarat (FFH 155), an Anzac-class frigate commissioned in 2004 and active as of 2019

== Battle honours ==
Three battle honours are carried by ships named HMAS Ballarat:

- Pacific 1941–45
- New Guinea 1942–44
- Okinawa 1945
