= KB Lager =

Brand of Australian beer

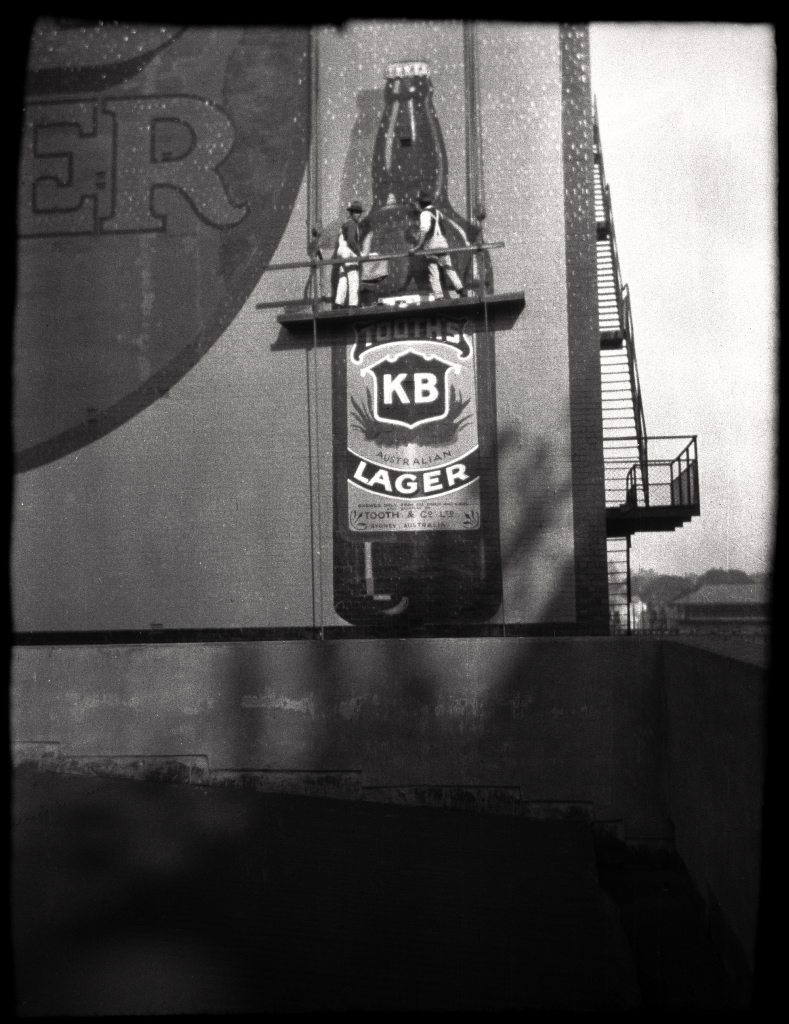
Advertising for K B Lager, 1920

KB Lager, named after the Kent Brewery, is an Australian beer, and was once one of the most popular beers in New South Wales. It was popularised amongst a younger demographic by the fictional beer-swilling rugby league legend Reg Reagan as his beer of choice.

KB sponsored rugby league tournament KB Cup (1982–83).

== See also ==
- Australian pub
- Beer in Australia
- List of breweries in Australia
