= Crown Lager =

Australian beer

- Manufacturer: Carlton & United Beverages (Foster's Group)
- Origin: Australia
- Introduced: 1919
- Alcohol by volume: 4.9%
- Colour: dark amber
- Style: Australian lager
- Website: crownlager.com.au

Crown Lager is a 4.9% premium Australian beer originally made by Carlton & United Breweries (CUB), a subsidiary of Foster's Group. The beer was first brewed in 1919 under its former name, "Foster's Crown Lager".

== History ==
Carlton & United Breweries has promoted Crown Lager (known colloquially as a "crownie") with the story that it was originally brewed in 1919 as "Foster's Crown Lager" and was initially only available to visiting dignitaries that visited Australia. During the first royal visit of Queen Elizabeth II to Australia in 1954, Carlton & United Breweries marked the occasion releasing Crown Lager. The company is currently re-investigating this history following claims that Foster's Crown Lager was brewed prior to 1919 and that it was widely available to the public prior to 1954.

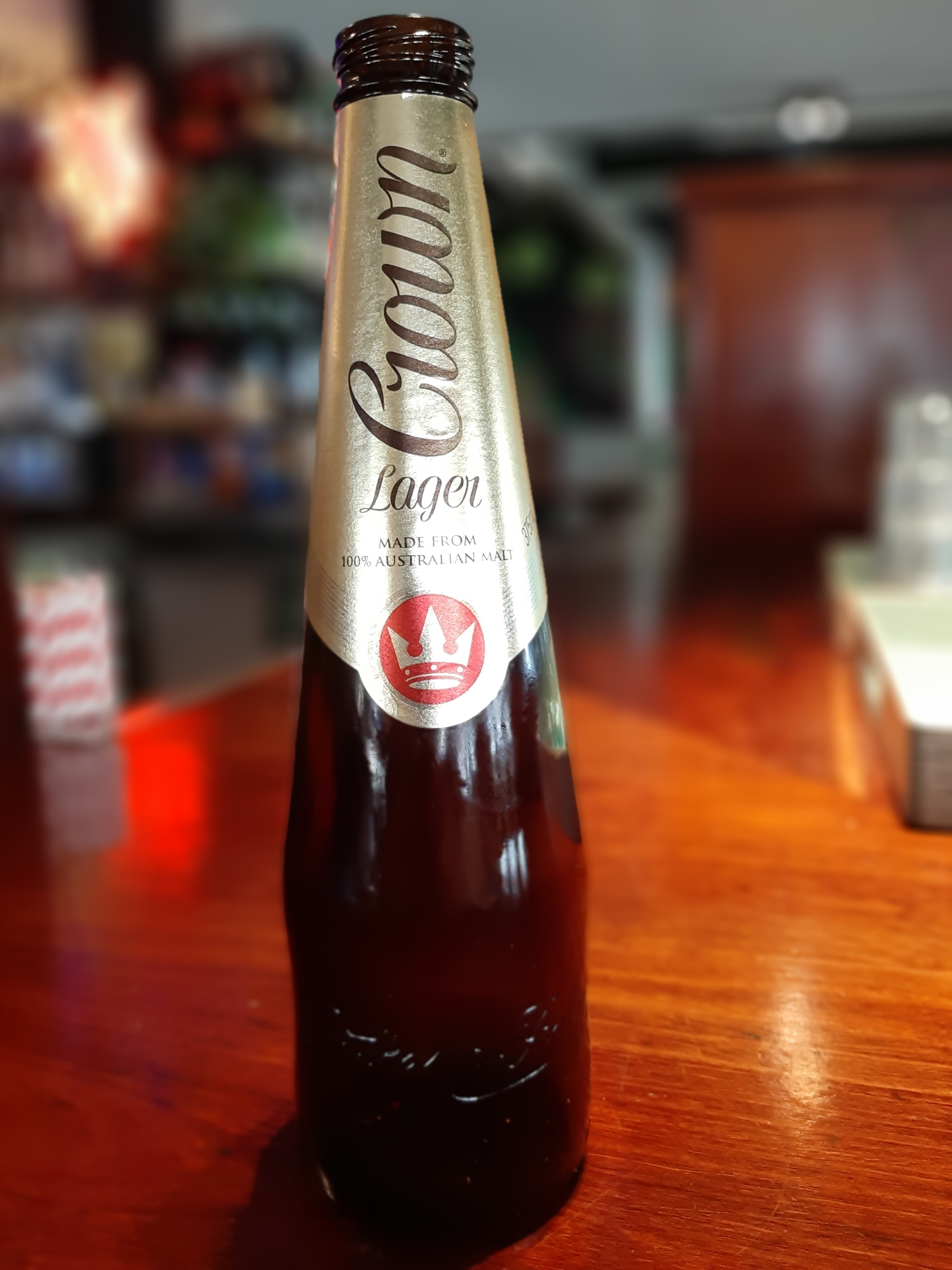
Crown Lager bottle

Crown lager is recognisable by its uniquely shaped bottle that also features its trademarked logo since 1954. The logo has only changed four times in the history of the beer. It remains one of Australia's most popular premium lagers. The unique bottle shape and label was designed by Eveline Annie Harvey (22 May 1910 – 5 August 2008), a commercial artist working in Melbourne. She was also responsible for many other well-known labels during the period, such as Monbulk Jam, and others. Harvey was the artist chosen by General Douglas MacArthur to draw critical and highly secretive maps during the war. Harvey produced the Crown Lager artwork at print size using only a (single haired) paintbrush and her exceptional skill as were the methods of the time.

In 2003, former Foster's president and CEO Ted Kunkel declared that in that year in a speech that 2003 would be the 50th anniversary for Crown Lager. Kunkel had also announced that the beer continued to show high growth, concluding the beer was still Australia's leading premium beer. Crown Lager was originally produced as an export beer—the current bottle shape and label remain mostly identical to Harvey's original artwork except that the word 'Export' has been removed. Crown Lager has marketed itself as a premium beer in the Australian market. As such it has formed an affiliation with Golf Australia to create the Crown Lager Social Golf Club.

== Varieties ==
In 2006, CUB released two alternative types of beer under the crown banner.

"Crown Gold" is a Mid-strength beer, available only in Queensland, Western Australia and the Northern Territory. The ale was launched in 2014 to hold its market share in an increasing competitive beer market. Crown Lager sales in the March 2014 results had shown that it had declined in the past year.

- "Crown Pilsner" – a limited release European-style beer available at selected venues.
- "Crown Golden Ale" – Australian-style ale with citrus and floral aromas and a sweet maltiness.
- "Crown Ambassador Reserve" –

== See also ==
- List of breweries in Australia
