= Pure Blonde =

Australian low carbohydrate beer

- Manufacturer: Carlton & United Beverages
- Introduced: 2004
- Alcohol by volume: 4.6%
- Style: Pale Lager
- Website: www.pureblonde.com.au

Pure Blonde is a brand of low-carb beer and cider produced in Australia. As of 2020, the brand is marketed internationally by Lion.

== Styles ==
As of 2020, there are three Pure Blonde drinks marketed in Australia: Pure Blonde Organic Lager; Pure Blonde Ultra Low Carb Lager and Pure Blonde Organic Cider.

Previously marketed styles include:

- Pure Blonde Premium Lager, released to the Australian market in 2004, the first low-carb beer in the country. According to CUB, the beer had 70 percent less carbohydrates than other lagers on the market. Pure Blonde Premium Lager was available on tap and also in 355ml bottles and had an alcohol level of 4.6% ABV/1.3 standard drinks.
- Pure Blonde Naked Lager was an all-malt lager made with Galaxy hops, which the brewer claims contains no artificial preservatives and over 50 per cent fewer carbohydrates than the average of mid-strength beers, with an ABV of 3.5% ABV.
- Pure Blonde White Lager (wheat beer) was launched by Carlton & United Beverages in November 2010. It was available on tap in selected venues nationally and also in 355ml bottles and had an ABV of 4.6%/1.3 standard drinks.

== Awards ==
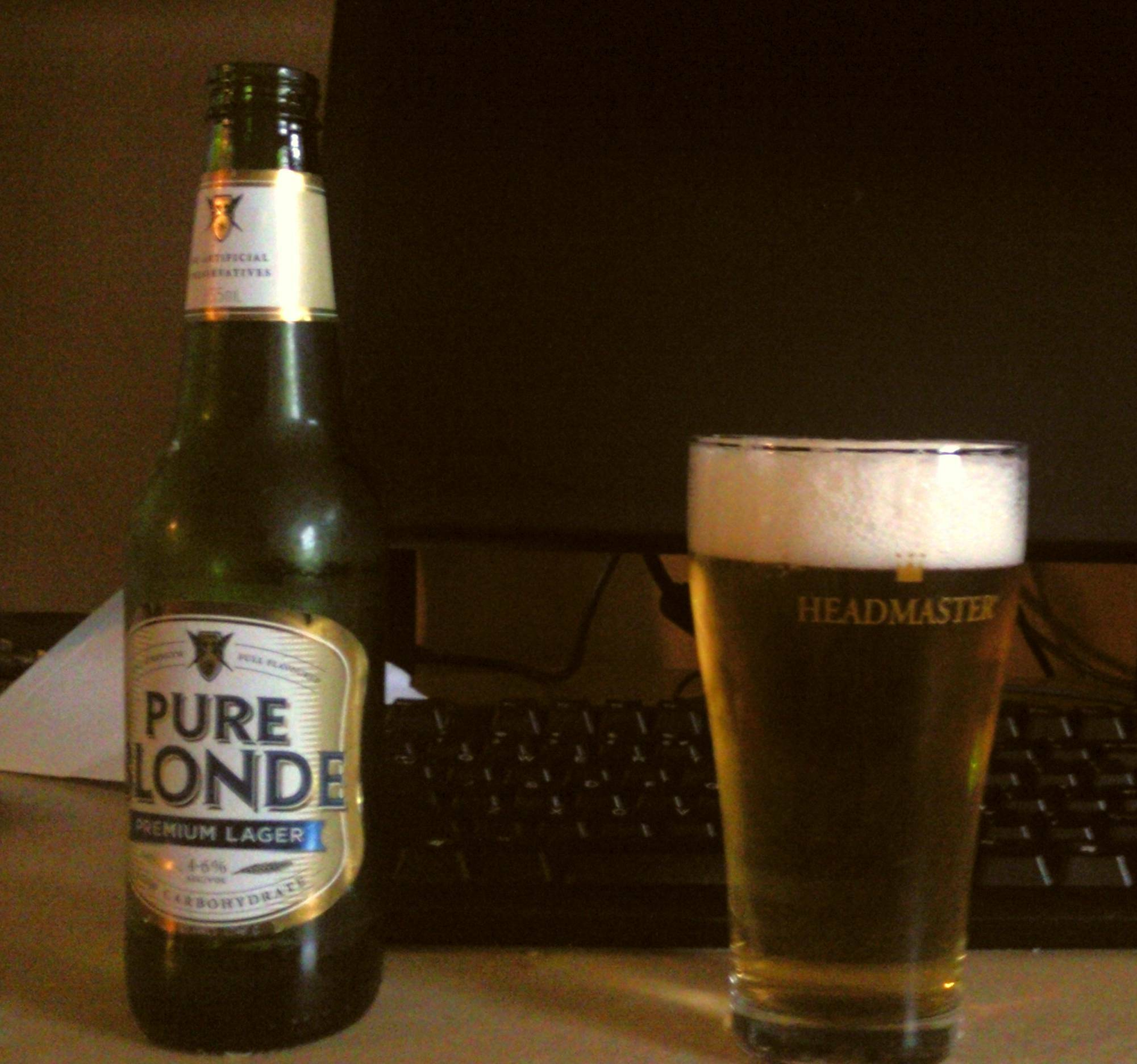
A stubby and glass of Pure Blonde

The Pure Blonde Brewtopia campaign:

- Won Gold at the EFFIES in 2009
- Won Silver in TV Lotus – Best of Alcoholic Beverages Category at Adfest 2008
- Was a finalist in the Film – Alcoholic Drinks category at Cannes 2008
- Won Silver in the Food/Beverage Category in the Phenoix Awards in 2008

The Pure Blonde Dove Love campaign:

- Won Bronze in the Best 45+" TV/Cinema category at the MADC Awards 2010.
- Won Silver in the TV Over 30" category at the AWARD Awards (2010)
- Won Silver in the TV Over 30" category at SPIKES ASIA (September 2010)
- Won a Mobius in 2008 in the Alcoholic Beverage Category and Technique: Direction category

== Music sponsorship ==
Pure Blonde has supported the Australian music scene since 2009 with a series of summer music festival sponsorships throughout the summer.

== See also ==
- List of breweries in Australia
