= Cougar Bourbon =

American brand of bourbon whiskey

Cougar bourbon whiskey, formerly called Sam Cougar's, is a brand of bourbon whiskey produced in Lawrenceburg, Indiana, by MGP Ingredients. It is an export-only brand owned by Foster's Group (a division of SABMiller) that is bottled and sold in Australia and New Zealand, where it is a popular bourbon whiskey. It is sold at 37% alcohol by volume.

== Sponsorship ==
Cougar is a sponsor of the TV comedy program, Stand Up Australia.
