= Emil Resch =

German-Australian brewer

- Born: 9 June 1860; Aalen, Württemberg
- Died: 22 May 1930 (aged 82)
- Notable work: Resch's Limited

Emil Karl Resch (9 June 1860 – 22 May 1930) was a German-Australian brewer. He founded and operated the successful brewing company Resch's Limited, the name of which survives today as beer brand Resch's.

== Early years ==
Resch was son of Johann Nicolaus Resch, ironmaster, and his wife Julia Bernhardine Louise Wilhelmine, née Heitmann, both of Saxony.
