= Melbourne Bitter =

Australian beer

- Manufacturer: Carlton & United Beverages, a subsidiary of Asahi
- Alcohol by volume: 4.6%
- Style: Full strength bitter lager

Melbourne Bitter is a brand of beer brewed by Carlton & United Breweries, (or CUB), a subsidiary of Asahi. While originally having an ABV of 4.9%, it has since been reduced to 4.6% ABV. Melbourne Bitter is available in 375 mL bottles ("stubbies"), 375 mL cans ("tinnies") and 750 mL bottles ("longnecks", or "longies/tallies").

== Overview ==
Melbourne Bitter stubby

Melbourne Bitter does not hold the iconic status of many of its counterparts at CUB, such as Victoria Bitter and Carlton Draught; however, it maintains a loyal customer base around Australia, predominantly in Victoria. Melbourne Bitter was first brewed by renowned Melbourne brewers Jack Prendergast & Nick Deheer in 1936 and was sold to CUB later that year. The beer quickly gained popularity amongst drinkers from regional Victoria for its robust flavour and strong bitter aftertones provided by the Pride of Ringwood hops. In recent years, it has experienced a resurgence in popularity.

CUB launched Melbourne Bitter draught in May 2015 in around 40 venues, including in Melbourne, Canberra, Adelaide and Darwin. Previously the beer had only been available in can or bottle form.

In 2016, CUB began trialing Melbourne Bitter in the Sydney market, including at Abbotts Hotel in Waterloo, New South Wales.

== See also ==
- Australian pub
- Beer in Australia
- List of breweries in Australia
