= Vodka Cruiser =

Vodka-based alcoholic premix drink

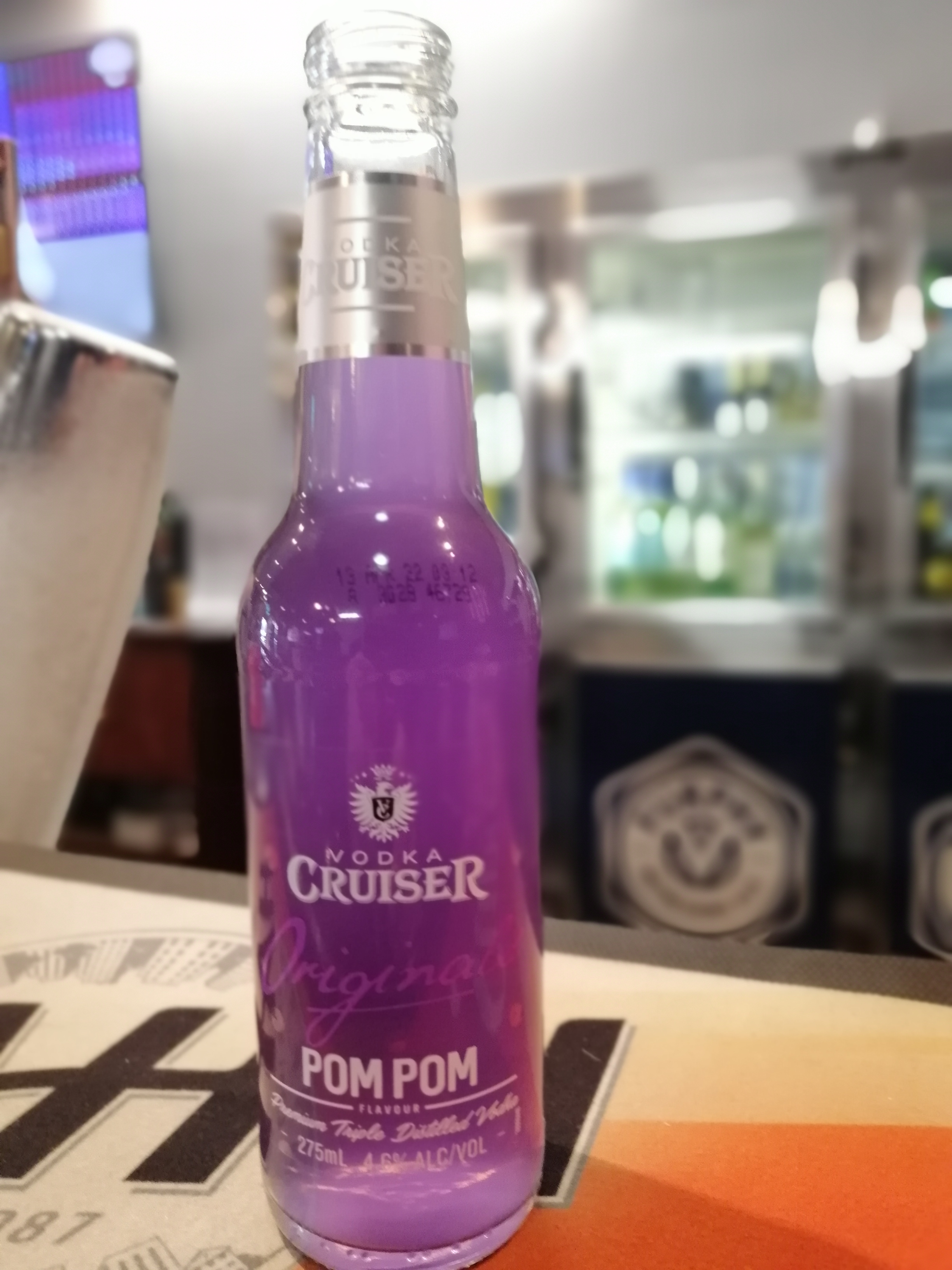
- 275ml bottle of "Pom Pom" flavoured Vodka Cruiser
- Type: Alcoholic beverage
- Manufacturer: Asahi Beverages
- Origin: New Zealand
- Introduced: 2000; 25 years ago
- Alcohol by volume: 5% - 7%
- Style: Alcopop
- Website: vodkacruiser.com.au

Vodka Cruiser is a line of brightly coloured vodka-based alcoholic beverages primarily sold in Australia and New Zealand. Sometimes described as an alcopop, this premixed drink is available in seventeen flavours, including guava, lemon, lime, passion fruit, pineapple, raspberry, and other flavours depending on location. The product originates from New Zealand, and is produced by Asahi Beverages, formerly known as Independent Liquor.

Vodka Cruisers normally come in 275 ml (9.3 oz) bottles, so each bottle contains slightly less alcohol than a standard shot. In 2022, Asahi Australia launched a range of limited-edition 3.1L "Double Magnum" sized bottles, containing the volume of roughly 11 regular cruisers, which could be won in a giveaway to celebrate the brand's 21st birthday.

== Varieties ==
In late 2003, Independent Liquor introduced a "Cruiser Black" range, containing a higher alcohol volume than standard varieties. In New Zealand, Vodka Cruisers are also available in a 7% alcohol, premium formulation sold in cardboard packages containing 12 cans of 250 ml each. According to the package labelling, each can has an alcohol content equivalent to 1.6 standard drinks, though the New Zealand definition of a standard drink would place one can at 1.75 standard drinks. In 2023, Asahi introduced a second high ABV range with the Vodka Cruiser Double line, which contains the equivalent of 2 standard drinks per beverage and comes packaged in 375ml cans rather than the standard 275ml bottles.

In 2009, Independent Distillers attempted to expand the Cruiser brand across a larger range of premix alcoholic beverages with the introduction of new female-oriented drinks, including the ready-to-drink line "Lady Luck", which contained half the sugar of a standard vodka cruiser, a blonde lager under the name "Hummingbird", and a cider under the name of "Apparella". Each of these product lines were available for a short period before being discontinued.

In 2012, Asahi Beverages announced the reformulation of the Vodka Cruiser product line in Australia, introducing six new core flavours to replace the original lineup while reducing the drink's sugar content.

In 2022, Asahi released 600ml long neck versions of the Guava and Raspberry Vodka Cruiser flavours for a limited time in Australia, following demand from fans on social media.

== Flavours ==
=== Australia ===
Standard Flavours: Juicy Watermelon, Wild Raspberry, Lush Guava, Pure Pineapple, Zesty Lemon-Lime, Bold Berry, Sunny Orange Passionfruit, Summer Peach, Exotic Lychee, and Ripe Strawberry.

Zero Sugar: Mixed Berry, Mango Raspberry, Strawberry Watermelon, Melon Lime, and Pineapple.

Doubles: Guava, Lemon Lime, Raspberry, Low Sugar Passionfruit, Green Apple

Sour: Sour Apple, Sour Grape.

Cocktails: Lime Margarita, Raspberry Cosmopolitan, Passionfruit Daiquiri.

Limited Edition: Pale Lime & Strawberry, Crisp Pear, Scrumptious Boysenberry, and Apple Blackcurrant.

Originals (Note: Although these flavours have been discontinued from regular production, some have returned in limited-edition batches.): Black Cherry, Electric Pink (pink grapefruit), Pom Pom (pomegranate), Blueberry, Carnivale (toffee-apple), Ice (citrus), and Pine Lime.

Mudshakes: Original Cowboy, Classic Chocolate, and Espresso Martini.

=== New Zealand ===
Standard Flavours: Cool Lime, Very Blueberry, Zesty Watermelon, Pure Passionfruit, Bold Blackcurrant & Apple, Juicy Mango Raspberry, Wild Raspberry, and Crisp Ice.

Discontinued: Pineapple, Guava, Electric Pink, Pom Pom, Black Cherry, Exotic Fruits.

Limited Edition: Strawberry Kiwi, Wild Berry, Lush Strawberry & Lemon, Tropical Peach & Mango Sorbet.
