= Yatala Brewery =

Brewery based in Yatala in South East Queensland, Australia

Coordinates: 27°45′16.15″S 153°14′4.53″E

Carlton & United Breweries Yatala
- Industry: Beer
- Founded: 1988; 38 years ago in Yatala, Queensland, Australia
- Founders: Bernie Power
- Headquarters: Yatala, Queensland, Australia
- Owner: Carlton & United Breweries
- Website: Official website

Carlton & United Breweries Yatala, formerly Power's Brewery and commonly known as the Yatala Brewery, is a brewery located at Yatala in South East Queensland. It is the largest brewery in Australia.

The story of Power's Brewery can now be found on Liquid wit-Power's Bitter advertising campaign. Other mentions of the beer can be found on the Foster's lager page and Australian beer page.

== Power's Brewery ==
- Power's Bitter
- Power's Dry
- Power's Gold

== See also ==
- Australian pub
- Beer in Australia
- List of breweries in Australia
- 1992 NRL Grand Final
