= Beer in Australia =

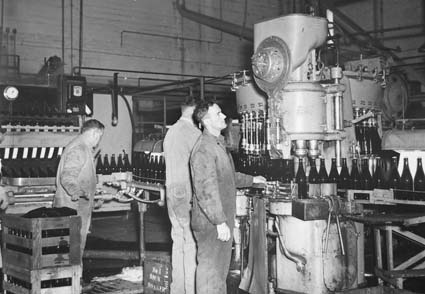
A bottling machine being used in 1945 as part of an Australian beer production operation

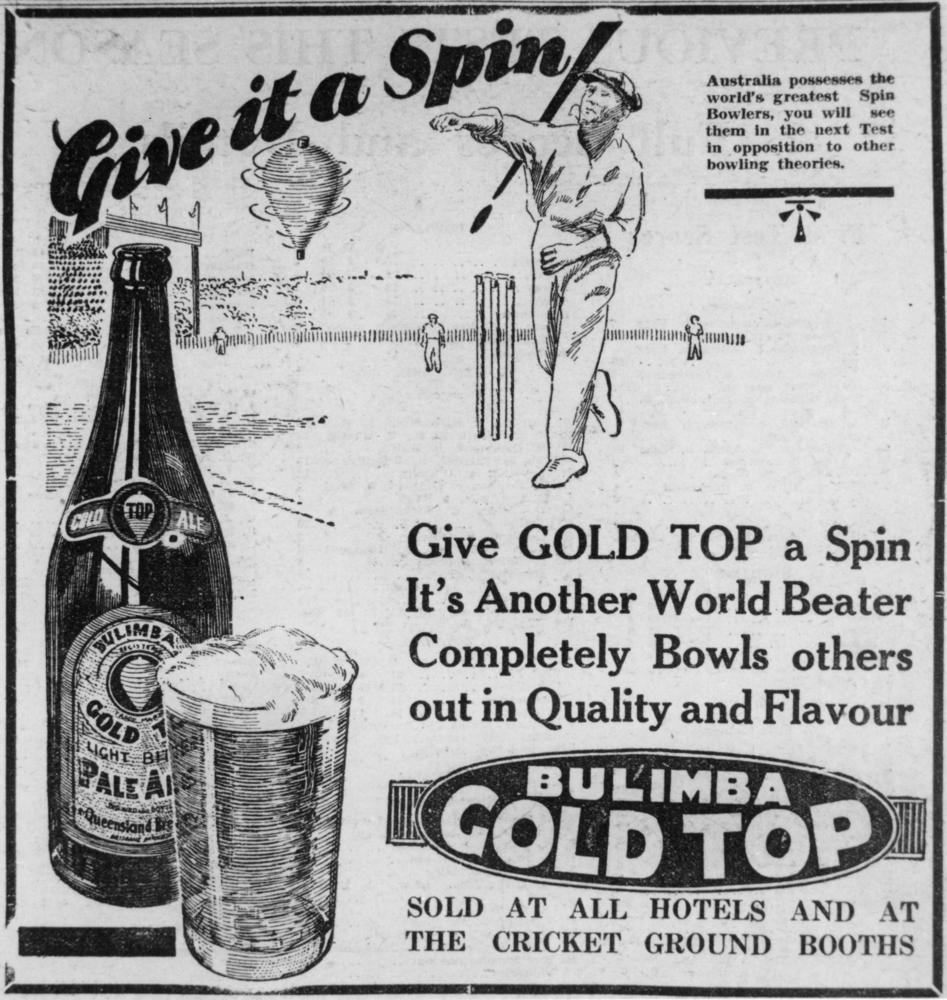
Advertisement for Bulimba Gold Top beer in Queensland, c. 1933

Beer in Australia can be traced to the beginning of British colonisation. Lager is by far the most popular type of beer consumed in Australia.

The oldest brewery still in operation is the Cascade Brewery, established in Tasmania in 1824 and now owned by Asahi. The largest Australian-owned brewery is Coopers Brewery; the other two major breweries, Carlton & United Breweries and Lion Nathan, are owned by Japan's Asahi Breweries and Kirin Company respectively.

== Market characteristics ==
Perhaps because of the generally hot, dry climate, Australian beer drinkers soon came to favour chilled pilsener style beers. This trend was reinforced with the expansion and consolidation of the Australian brewing industry, and by the development of hop growing, especially in Tasmania.

The dominance of chilled pilsener beer was further reinforced by the invention of refrigeration. Australia was one of the first countries to adopt the new technology on a wide scale and pubs were among the first local businesses to use refrigeration, to keep beer ice-cold.

Another notable feature of Australian beer is its relatively high alcohol content, which for many years has typically ranged between 4 percent and 6 percent alcohol – somewhat higher than their British and American counterparts.

Beer production in Australia began with small private breweries supplying local pubs. The industry rapidly became both larger in scale and more centralised as brewers adopted mass-production techniques during the late 19th century and new modes of transport came into operation.

By the 20th century the major brewing firms had become very large vertically integrated businesses. They owned the breweries and ran truck fleets and distribution networks, and the major brewers owned chains of pubs across the country. The premises were typically operated on a leasehold basis by licensed publicans.

As they grew, the larger and more successful firms began to take over smaller breweries, although they often retained the older brand names and the loyal clientele of those brands, such as Carlton & United Breweries (CUB) continuing to distribute "Tooth's KB Lager" and "Resch's Pilsener" and "DA" ("Dinner Ale") after they had bought and eventually closed the Reschs and Tooths breweries. By the mid-20th century the brewing industry was dominated by a handful of large and powerful state-based companies: Tooth's and Toohey's in Sydney, Carlton United in Melbourne, Castlemaine in Brisbane, West End and Coopers in Adelaide and Swan in Perth. These brands effectively became unofficial mascots for their respective states. In Victoria, until the late 1990s, a distinction was largely observed of serving the similar CUB lagers Carlton Draught on tap and Victoria Bitter and, to a lesser extent, Melbourne Bitter in bottles and cans; as Victoria Bitter became a prominent national brand on tap, in turn it became considerably more common on tap in Victoria.

In the late 20th century these beer empires began to expand overseas, before being themselves merged into consolidated global producers; brands under the Australasian CUB and Lion-Nathan subsidiaries of major global beverage empires have considerable presence in Australasia, the UK, Europe and many other regions.

In 2008, within an alcoholic beverage market worth some A$16.3 billion, equivalent to A$22.6 billion in 2022, beer comprised about 48% compared to wine at 29% and spirits at 21%. Within the beer sector, premium beers had a 7.8% share of the market; full-strength beer 70.6%; mid-strength 12%; and light beer 9.6%. Overall, 85% of beer was produced by national brewers, the remainder by regional or microbreweries. Microbreweries manufacturing less than 30,000 litres (7,900 US gal) received a 60% excise rebate.

== History ==
=== 18th century ===
The history of Australian beer starts very early in Australia's colonial history. Captain James Cook brought beer with him on his ship HMS Endeavour as a means of preserving drinking water. On 1 August 1768, as Cook was fitting out the Endeavour for its voyage, Nathaniel Hulme wrote to Joseph Banks with a recommendation:

a quantity of Molasses and Turpentine, in order to brew Beer with, for your daily drink, when your Water becomes bad. … [B]rewing Beer at sea will be peculiarly useful in case you should have stinking water on board; for I find by Experience that the smell of stinking water will be entirely destroyed by the process of fermentation.

— Letter to Joseph Banks 1768

Beer was still being consumed on-board two years later in 1770, when Cook was the first European to discover the east coast of Australia.

The drink of choice for the first settlers and convicts was rum, as represented in a supposed traditional convict song:

Cut yer name across me backbone
Stretch me skin across yer drum
Iron me up on Pinchgut Island
From now to Kingdom Come.
I'll eat yer Norfolk Dumpling
Like a juicy Spanish plum,
Even dance the Newgate Hornpipe
If ye'll only gimme Rum!

The first official brewer in Australia was John Boston who brewed a beverage from Indian corn, bittered with cape gooseberry leaves. It is likely though that beer was brewed unofficially much earlier. The first pub, the Mason Arms, was opened in 1796 in Parramatta by James Larra, a freed convict.

=== 19th century ===
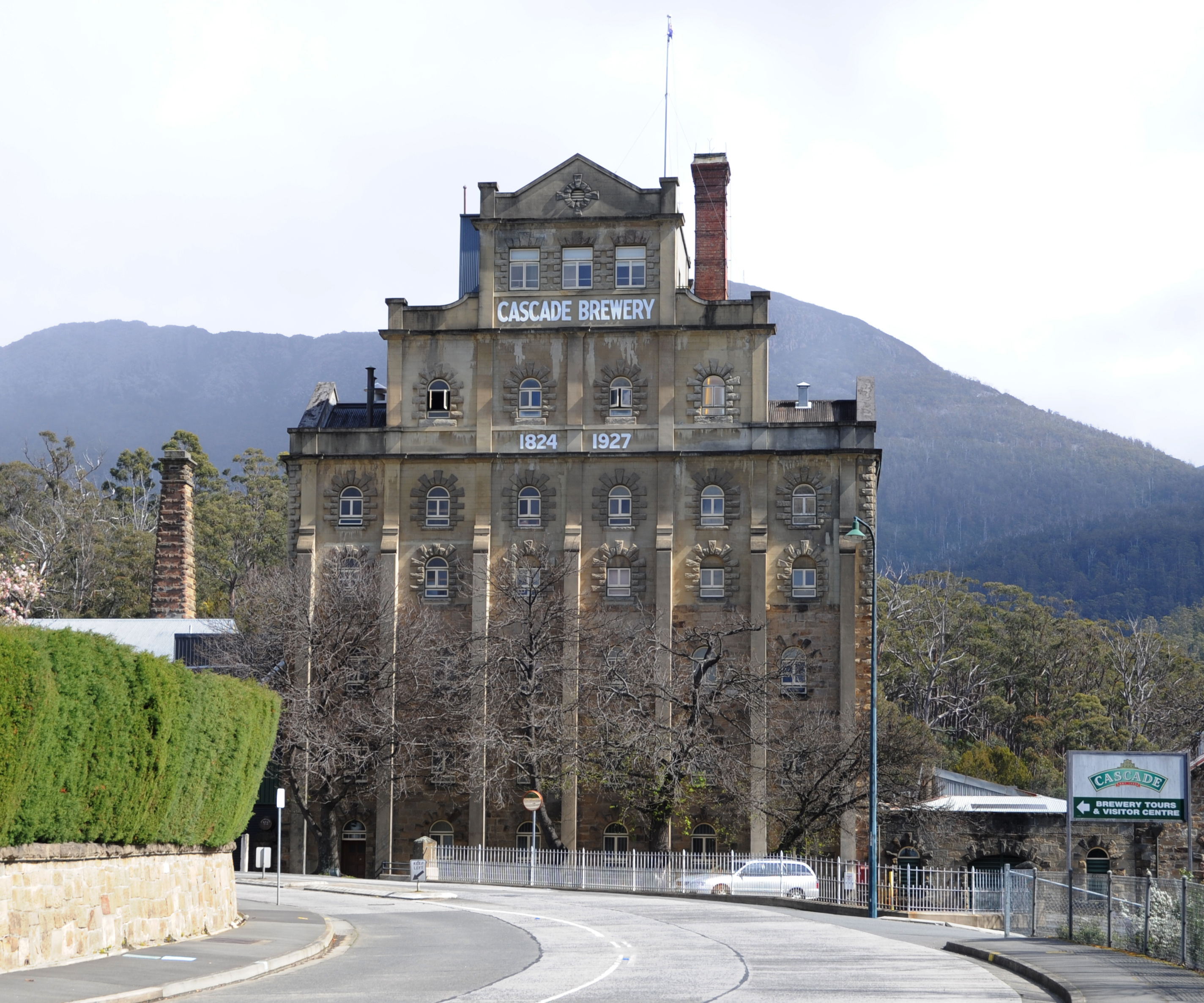
The Cascade Brewery is the oldest brewery in Australia, having been founded in 1824.

Rum was so popular – and official currency was in such short supply – that it became a semi-official currency for a period of time (see Rum corps), and even played a role in a short-lived military coup, the Rum rebellion in 1808. Drunkenness was a significant problem in the early colony:

Drunkenness was a prevailing vice. Even children were to be seen in the streets intoxicated. On Sundays, men and women might be observed standing round the public-house doors, waiting for the expiration of the hours of public worship in order to continue their carousing. As for the condition of the prison population, that, indeed, is indescribable. Notwithstanding the severe punishment for sly grog selling, it was carried on to a large extent. Men and women were found intoxicated together, and a bottle of brandy was considered to be cheaply bought for 20 lashes... All that the vilest and most bestial of human creatures could invent and practise, was in this unhappy country invented and practised without restraint and without shame

— Marcus Clarke, For the Term of his Natural Life, 1867

As a means of reducing drunkenness, beer was promoted as a safer and healthier alternative to rum:

The introduction of beer into general use among the inhabitants would certainly lessen the consumption of spirituous liquors. I have therefore in conformity with your suggestion taken measures for furnishing the colony with a supply of ten tons of Porter, six bags of hops, and two complete sets of brewing materials.

— Lord Hobart in a letter to Governor Philip King on 29 August 1802

Although modern Australian beer is predominantly Australian lager, early Australian beers were exclusively top-fermented and quick-maturing ales. Lager was not brewed in Australia until 1885. Early beers were also brewed without the benefit of hops, as no-one had successfully cultivated hops in Australia and importation was difficult. James Squire was the first to successfully cultivate hops in 1804, and he also opened a pub and brewed beer. The Government Gazette from 1806 mentions that he was awarded a cow herd from the government for his efforts.

In September 1804, a government-owned brewery opened in Parramatta, followed by a rival privately owned brewery three months later. The government brewery was sold two years later to Thomas Rushton, who was its head (and only) brewer. Brewing rapidly expanded in all of the Australian colonies and by 1871 there were 126 breweries in Victoria alone, which at the time had a population of only 800,000.

Notable events from this period include:

- 1832: Peter Degraves starts the Cascade Brewery in Hobart. It is Australia's oldest operational brewery.
- 1835: Tooth brewery established in Sydney.
- 1837: James Stokes establishes the Albion Brewery, Perth's first brewery, which later became the Emu Brewery.
- 1838: John Warren starts "The Torrens", Adelaide's first brewery.
- 1838: John Mills establishes the first brewery in Melbourne.
- 1844: William Henry Clark founded the Halifax Street Brewery in SA (Later to be known as West End Brewery).
- 1848: James Stokes opens the Stanley brewery at the Foot of Mt Eliza. (Later Changed to the Emu Brewery).
- 1853: Queensland's first brewery, "The Brisbane Brewery" is opened by John Beach.
- 1862: Thomas Cooper establishes the Coopers Brewery in the Adelaide suburb of Norwood. The brewery continues to be owned and operated by the Cooper family, and since 2011 has been the largest Australian-owned brewery.
- 1864: Carlton brewery opens in Melbourne.
- 1881: CS Button opens the Esk Brewery in Launceston.
- 1882: Cohn Brothers' Victoria Brewery in Bendigo becomes the first brewery in Australia to brew lager.
- 1883: In 1883, James I and his son took over the Esk Brewery. J. Boag & Sons was officially formed.
- 1887: The Foster brothers arrive from New York with refrigeration equipment and establish the first lager brewery to use refrigeration in Australia.
- 1889: Lager is first brewed in Queensland at the Castlemaine and Quinlan brewery.

Tasmania was the first Australian colony to tax beer. Its Beer Duty Act of 1880 established a duty of 3 pence per gallon, equivalent to A$0.36 per litre in 2022, which was raised to four pence in 1892, equivalent to A$0.71 per litre in 2022.

=== 20th century ===
By 1900 the number of breweries had begun to dwindle as a result of the recession of the 1890s. In 1901, just after Federation, the new federal government passed the Beer and Excise Act. This act regulated the making and selling of beer and made homebrewing illegal. The provisions in this act, regarded by many as draconian, led to the closure of many breweries. In Sydney 16 out of 21 breweries closed either immediately after the act's introduction or soon afterwards. The remaining breweries began a process of consolidation, with larger breweries buying out the smaller ones. Within a short period of time, only two breweries remained in Sydney: Tooths and Tooheys. In Melbourne, five breweries merged in 1907 to form the giant Carlton and United Breweries.

- 1951 - Harry Ellis-Kells founded the Darwin Brewery (to be known as N.T Brewery)

=== 21st century ===
Since 2011, Kirin-owned Lion Co and AB InBev-owned Foster's Group own every major brewery in Australia, with the exception of Coopers. Boag's Brewery, previously owned by San Miguel, was sold to Lion Nathan for A$325 million in November 2007. In 2006 Boag's Brewery reported total revenues of A$92 million.

Although Foster's Lager is not a popular domestic beer in the 21st century, its popularity internationally has grown and the product is made mostly in other countries. In January 2005, the brand was one of the ten best-selling beers globally.

The introduction of the Tap King product by Lion Nathan in mid-2013 caused controversy due to the perceived impact upon alcohol venues. The product is a home draught beer dispenser and raised concerns regarding lower patronage rates for venues due to a greater incentive for consumers to drink beer in home environments. The product is sold with a CO_{2} gas chamber that is cooled for eight hours prior to use.

== Beers by region ==
Before federation in 1901, Australia was a patchwork of separate colonies, each with different laws regulating the production and sale of alcohol. In addition, until the late 1880s when the rail network began to link the capital cities together, the only means of transporting foods in bulk between the colonies was by sea. This prevented even the largest breweries from distributing significant amounts outside their home city. This allowed strong regional brands to emerge; and, although all but one of the major regional brands (Coopers) are now owned by multinational companies, loyalty to the local brewery remains strong today.

- Australian Capital Territory: Bentspoke Brewing Co and Capital Brewing Company
- New South Wales: Tooheys, Reschs and Tooths
- Northern Territory: NT Draught
- Queensland: Castlemaine XXXX, Powers and Great Northern
- South Australia: Coopers, West End and Southwark
- Tasmania: Boags in the north, Cascade in the south
- Victoria: Carlton Draught, Melbourne Bitter, Victoria Bitter
- Western Australia: Swan, Emu and Kalgoorlie

While Foster's Group owns many of these brands, Foster's Lager itself is not considered a local drink anywhere in Australia.

== Speciality beers ==
Speciality brews in Australia are produced by both major brewers and microbreweries, and include a wide variety of ales. Microbreweries exist throughout the country, including small towns, but the availability of such beers on-tap in venues is often limited.

Microbrewery Nail Brewing, from Perth, Western Australia, produced a beer in 2010 using water from an Antarctic iceberg, and sold it at auction for US$1,850, equivalent to US$2,731 in 2025. The batch of 30 bottles was created to raise money for the Sea Shepherd Conservation Society, which assisted with the procuring of the ice.

== Australian styles ==
Australia has some unique beer styles of its own:

Name	Description	Image
Australian lager	A lager with an amber hue and slightly bitter flavour typically brewed with Pride of Ringwood hops or its descendants.	Australian style lager (cropped)
Australian pale ale	A beer style with a balanced malty profile, a slightly floral hop profile and dry finish.	Australian pale ale (cropped)
Pacific ale	A hazy pale ale brewed with malt, wheat and galaxy hops. Pacific ales have a tropical fruit aroma and a natural sweetness.	Pacific ale q (cropped)
Sparkling ale	A highly carbonated ale with low to medium maltiness and a lightly fruity flavour.	Sparkling ale (cropped)

== Brewed under licence ==
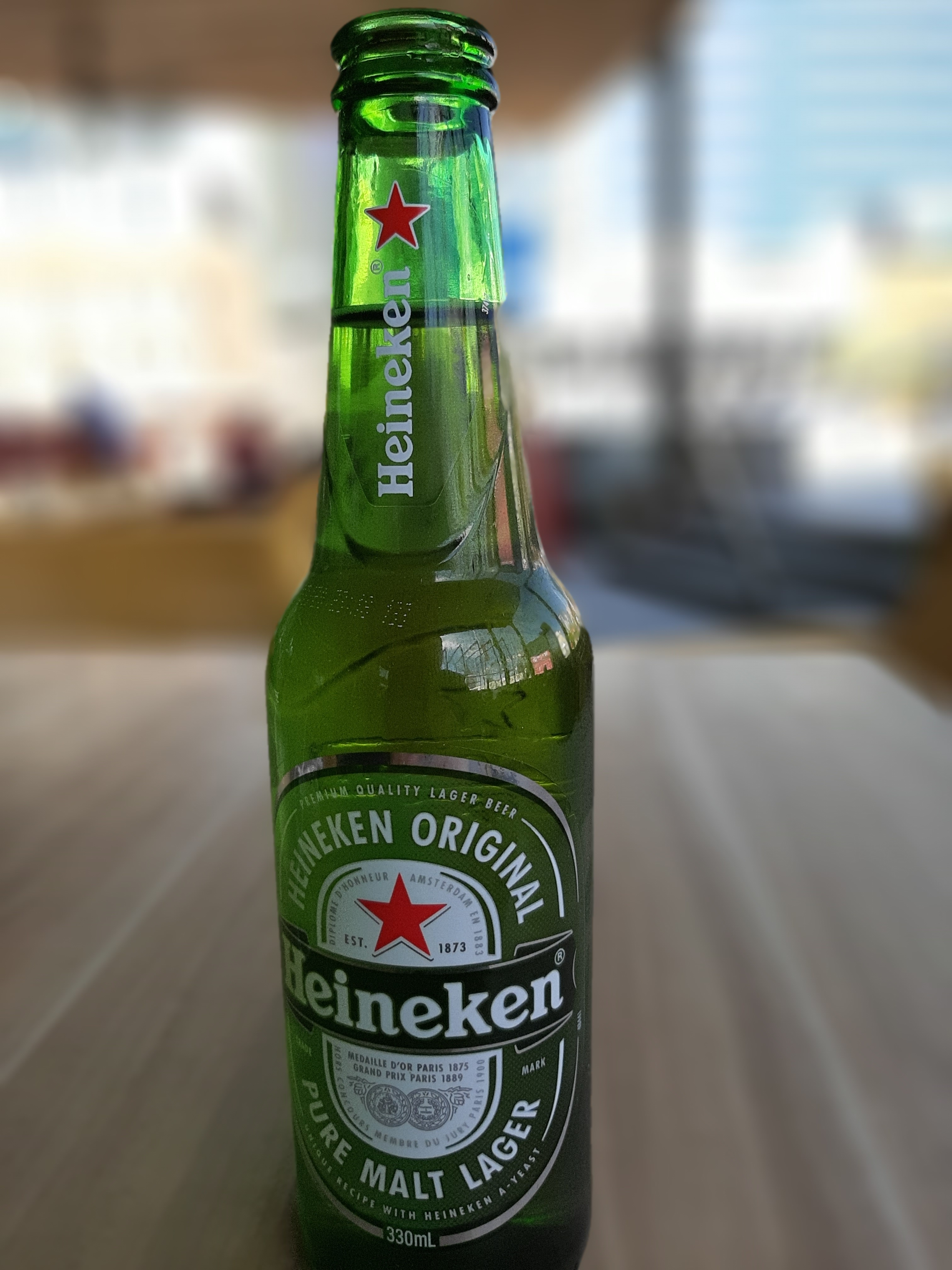
Heineken 330 mL bottle brewed under licence in Australia

Imported premium beers have started to gain market share in Australia. The two Australian corporate brewers responded to this by signing licence agreements with foreign brands to brew their beers here. Foster's Group brews Kronenbourg. Coopers Brewery brews Carlsberg in Australia. Lion Nathan locally produces Guinness, Heineken, Beck's, Stella Artois and Kirin. Brewers claim that their locally produced product tastes better because it is fresher, and local operations are overseen by the parent brewers using strict guidelines. However, groups such as the Australian Consumers Association say that such beers should have clearer, more prominent labels to inform drinkers.

== Sizes ==
=== Beer glasses ===
Before metrication in Australia, one could buy beer or cider in glasses of 4, 5, 6, 7, 9, 10, 15 or 20 (imperial) fluid ounces. Each sized glass had a different name in each Australian state.

These were replaced by glasses of size 115, 140, 170, 200, 285, 425 and 570 mL, and as Australians travel more, the differences are decreasing.

Smaller sizes have been phased out over time, and in the 21st century, very few pubs serve glasses smaller than 200 mL (approximately 7 imp fl oz).

Those typically available are the 200 mL, 285 mL (10 fl oz) and 425 mL (15 fl oz), with increasingly many pubs also having pints (570 mL, approximately 20 imp fl oz) available. It is also common for pubs and hotels to serve large jugs filled to 1140ml ( approximately two imp pints).

Many imported beers are also served in their own branded glasses of various sizes, including 250 millilitres (8.8 imp fl oz), 330 millilitres (11.6 imp fl oz) and 500 millilitres (17.6 imp fl oz) for many European beers.

Names of beer glasses in various Australian cities (Note: Entries in bold are common.) (Note: Entries in italics are old-fashioned or rare.) (Note: Entries marked with a dash are not applicable.)
Capacity (Note: The "fl oz" referred to here is the imperial fluid ounce.)	Sydney	Canberra	Darwin	Brisbane	Adelaide	Hobart	Melbourne	Perth
115 ml (4 fl oz)	–	–	–	–	-	small beer	foursie	shetland
140 ml (5 fl oz)	pony	–	–	pony	pony	–	horse/pony	pony
170 ml (6 fl oz)	–	–	–	–	butcher (Note: Before metrification, the butcher was 6 fl oz.)	six (ounce)	–	bobbie/six
200 ml (7 fl oz)	seven	–	**seven**	**beer**	**butcher**	seven (ounce)	**glass**	glass
285 ml (10 fl oz)	**middy**	**middy** / half pint	**handle**	**pot** (Note: "Pot" is also known as Pot glass)	**schooner** (Note: Confusingly for visitors, South Australians use the same names for different volumes than in the other States.)	**ten (ounce)**	**pot**	**middy** / half pint
350 ml (12 fl oz)	schmiddy (Note: A modern glass size, mainly used with European beers. While the glass may be 350ml, a 330ml or 300ml fill line is common. With the increasing popularity of European beers, glasses of size 250ml and 500ml are also becoming more prevalent, but as yet don't seem to have acquired "names".)	–	–	–	–	–	–	–
425 ml (15 fl oz)	**schooner**	**schooner**	**schooner**	**schooner**	**pint**	fifteen / **schooner**	**schooner**	schooner (Note: Traditionally, 425 ml is a size rarely found in Western Australia.)
570 ml (20 fl oz)	**pint**	**pint**	pint	**pint**	**imperial pint**	**pint**	**pint**	**pint**
Notes:							References: 1. The Aussie Beer Baron; 2. Buying Beer in Australia; 3. Guidelines at a glance 4. Ordering Beer; 5. Liquor Merchants Association of Australia (via archive.org); 6. Which Size Beer Do Ya Want, Mate? (via archive.org); 7. Take a butcher's hook at the butcher glass	

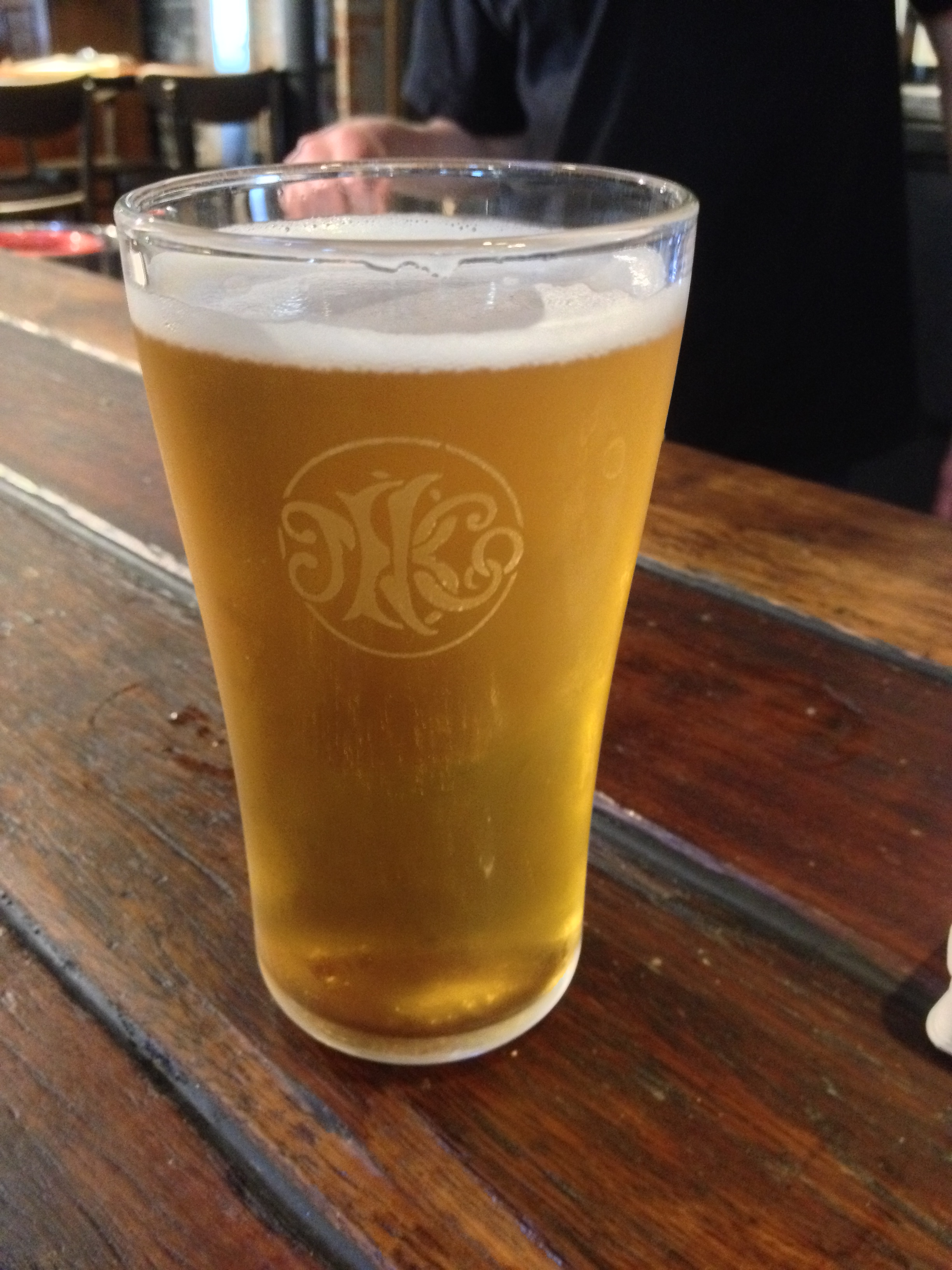
A glass of beer, produced by the Newstead Brewing Company

With the introduction of the National Trade Measurement Regulations in 2009 there are no prescribed sizes for beverage measures for the sale of beer, ale and stout, so terms such as seven, middy, pot or schooner do not legally specify a particular size. A typical "schooner" glass can be calibrated to hold 425ml to the rim but poured with 15mm of head, resulting in a "schooner" of 375ml of beer and 50ml of froth.

South Australia in particular has some unusually named measures:

- 6 fl oz (170 mL) – prior to metrification this glass was known as a "Butcher"
- 7 fl oz (200 mL), became known as a "Butcher" in later years after smaller sizes were phased out.
- 10 fl oz (285 mL) known as a "schooner". Prior to metrication and standardisation of glass sizes throughout Australia, schooners in SA were 9 fluid ounces (256 mL).
- 15 fl oz (425 mL) known as a "pint".
- 20 fl oz (570 mL) known as an "imperial pint".

Many of these sizes are now rarely used. In contemporary SA pubs and restaurants, the most frequent measures are the "schooner" of 285 mL (an imperial half pint), and the "pint" of 425 mL. "Imperial pints" are also increasingly popular, along with the sale of "premium" and non-locally brewed beer in bottles of between 300 mL to 375 mL.

Note that the SA "schooner" and "pint" are considerably smaller than the measures of the same name used elsewhere:

- the SA "schooner" (285 mL) is the same size as other States' pot / middy / half pint
- the SA "pint" (425 mL) is the same size as other States' schooner, and is three-quarters of an imperial pint.

Headmasters is one of the most common glass manufacturers, at least for the schooner size. Many pubs, in Sydney and Melbourne particularly, offer Guinness style and/or conical pint glasses along with tankard glass and British dimpled glass pint mugs.

Larger serving measurements have become increasingly popular, such as Jugs, 1 fluid litre Maß (pronounced like "mass", normally in German-themed bars) and beer towers (although technically illegal due to strict self-service of alcohol laws, these are in some Asian bars/karaoke parlours) have grown in popularity around Australia in tourist spots.

=== Beer bottles ===
The NT Draught Darwin Stubby

Before metrication, beer bottles were frequently 1/6 of an imperial gallon (26.7 imp fl oz; 757.7 mL), while a carton of beer contained a dozen bottles (two gallons) of beer. Originally, the bottles were reduced slightly to 26 imperial fluid ounces (739 mL), but with metrication they became 750 millilitres (26.4 imp fl oz), with a carton of 9 litres (1.98 imp gal) of beer.

From the 1950s, bottles known as "stubbies" (as compared to traditional bottles, they were "stubby") of 2/3 of an imperial pint (13.3 imp fl oz; 378.8 mL) were introduced. In 1958, cans were introduced by CUB, which were originally in steel and the same size as the bottle; other breweries introduced these in the 1960s.

Originally the stubbies and cans were reduced slightly to 13 imperial fluid ounces (369 mL), but with metrication they became 375 millilitres (13.2 imp fl oz), and the cans were later made of aluminium to accommodate its increasing use and lower cost compared to steel.

A carton of nine litres of beer in stubbies (i.e. 24 bottles) or cans became known as a "slab" because compared to the more cube-like shape of the traditional cartons, they were flatter, and hence, like slabs.

Traditional bottles subsequently became known as "long necks" or "tallies" to distinguish them from stubbies, and in Western Australia, the 750ml "long neck" bottle is known as a "king brown" because of the size and typical brown coloured glass (the term being wordplay in reference to the king brown snake).

In the 21st century, most bottled beer in Australia is sold in 250 mL (Throwdown/Twist Top), 375 mL (Stubby) or 750 mL (Long Neck) sizes. Carlton United briefly increased to 800 mL in the 1990s and 2000s, but this has since been reduced to the original 750 mL.

Bottle sizes of 330 mL, 345 mL and 355 mL (imported from the United States, equal to 12 US fl oz) are becoming increasingly common, particularly among microbreweries, so-called "premium" beers, and imported beers.

In the Northern Territory, the once-common "Darwin Stubby", a large two-litre bottle, is now sold largely as a tourist gimmick, albeit very successfully.

Most bottles are lightweight "single use only", though some are still reusable, and in some cases (e.g. Coopers 750 mL), breweries are reintroducing refillable bottles, such as the Growler (a large bottle of approximately two litres intended for re-use) sold by Four Pines Brewery – a boon to home brewers. In every state and territory, container deposits on beer bottles and cans (and some other types of beverage containers) support a well-established network of recycling centres, providing significant environmental benefits as well as generating employment opportunities for unskilled workers.

== Non-alcoholic beers ==
Non-alcoholic beer is a growing category within Australia, accounting for 45% of total non-alcoholic beverage sales in Australia in 2023, and approximately 10% of all Australian beer sales in 2024.

Notable Australian breweries that are dedicated to non-alcoholic beer varieties include Heaps Normal, a Canberra-born brand which has now reached international expansion and is worth over $60 million, sörzero, a "molecularly brewed" non-alcoholic beer that was among the first in the world to achieve a true 0.00% ABV rating, and Sobah, a non-alcoholic brand which featured Indigenous ingredients and native Australian flavours.

== Beer-related organisations ==
The Australian Hotels Association represents hoteliers around Australia. It was established in 1839. The Brewers Association of Australia and New Zealand was set up to advocate on behalf of brewers in both countries.

Drinkwise is an industry funded organisation that funds alcohol-related research and conducts public education activities. Ocsober is an Australian fundraising initiative that encourages people to give up alcohol for the month of October, while Dry July encourages people to give up alcohol for the month of July.

== See also ==
- Australian pub
- Beer and breweries by region
- List of breweries in Australia
- Australian wine
- Julodimorpha bakewelli
