= Orient Hotel, The Rocks =

Orient Hotel
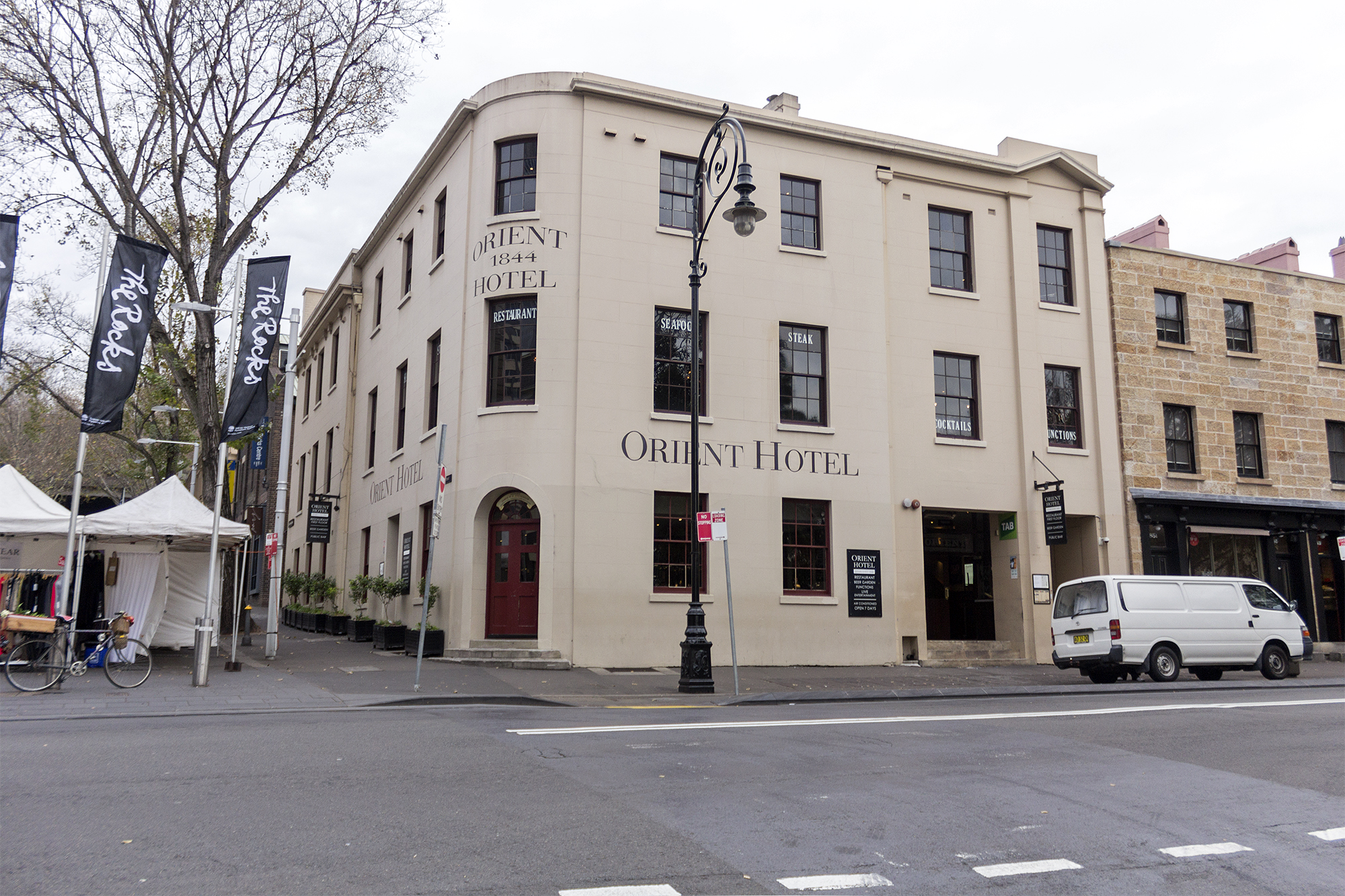
- Orient Hotel in 2014

- Location within Sydney Location within Australia
- 33.8591°S 151.2086°E
- Location: 87–89 George Street, The Rocks, City of Sydney, New South Wales, Australia

History
- Built: 1843–1844; 1922 and 1930s
- Built for: James Chapman (1844); Housing Board (1930s)

Site notes
- Architect(s): William Henry Foggitt (1922 and 1930s alterations)
- Architectural style: Colonial Georgian
- Owner: Property NSW

New South Wales Heritage Register
- Official name: Orient Hotel
- Type: State heritage (built)
- Designated: 10 May 2002
- Reference no.: 1567
- Type: Hotel
- Category: Commercial

The Orient Hotel is a heritage-listed pub located at 87–89 George Street, in the inner city Sydney suburb of The Rocks in the City of Sydney local government area of New South Wales, Australia. It was built from 1843 to 1844. The property is owned by Property NSW, an agency of the Government of New South Wales. It was added to the New South Wales State Heritage Register on 10 May 2002.

== History ==
This site was in the original grounds of Sydney's first hospital complex and later was enclosed by fencing to become a part of the Surgeon General's residence. In June 1828, the allotment was part of a land grant made to Captain John Piper.

=== Ownership by Frederick Unwin ===
The Orient Hotel site was classified in the general surveys of the town undertaken in the 1830s, ostensibly to formalise land boundaries and entitlements, as Lot 1 of City Section 85. By the time of the survey the allotment was in the ownership of the merchant Frederick Wright Unwin. Unwin had acquired the property from Mary Reibey in November 1828. Reibey's interest in the property lasted a matter of five months, over which time its value had increased from £2,025 in June 1828 to £2,500 on its sale in November. Reibey's intentions had been more long term however for she proposed to erect three houses along the George Street frontage. Owing to a problem with the land title (it not been issued and the extent of the George Street frontage was in dispute) Reibey evidently decided not to proceed further.

Unwin retained ownership over the boom years of the 1830s, only selling when the inevitable crash came in the early 1840s with total debts mounting to £45,000. Unwin was a solicitor and had come to the colony in 1827. Over the 1820s and 1830s he invested heavily in property in both the town and country. The George Street property was one of his earliest investments. Unwin's purchase in 1828 was inclusive of a stone building in the course of construction. Then construction of this building had in fact commenced during Piper's ownership and was described as "a building of great extent and expense". It was reported in the Sydney Gazette in 1826 that Piper had engaged 30–40 mechanics (carpenters, stonemasons, etc.) in its construction. It seems unlikely that this building was on the Orient Hotel site, and the exact use of the site during Unwin's ownership is not known. It would seem the building on the site may have been required to be demolished for the widening of George Street for which Unwin was compensated £800. Prior to the sale of the property in 1841, Unwin subdivided the land to form a number of allotments of which Lots 1 and 2 are historically associated with the Orient Hotel site.

=== Ownership by James Chapman and family ===
The pair of allotments were bought by the carcass butcher James Chapman in February 1842 for £1,101. It was Chapman who erected, probably in 1842, a three-storey residence of ten rooms and a neighbouring single storey shop, which were the first stage of what evolved over the nineteenth century into the Orient Hotel. The residence was one of the most valuable on George Street North on its completion and fitted, according to the council assessor, with every convenience on its first entry in the rate book for Gipps Ward in 1845.

Chapman by the 1840s had arguably some standing in the local community for he was a foundation councillor of the City Corporation (Council) in its first term of 1842–1845; he represented Gipps Ward that took in The Rocks. His business was evidently quite extensive in maintaining slaughter yards at Blackwattle Bay and was a large cattle buyer at Smithfield market. Over the mid-1840s Chapman had developed his land holding on George Street to benefit his business with the 1848 rate assessment noting the rear yard area with a brick stable and wooden shed. Chapman died in 1856 but for some years after his estate was contested by the property developer Andrew Hardie McCulloch. Henry Milford was subsequently appointed by the Supreme Court in June 1858 as trustee of Chapman' estate.

==== Conversion to a licensed premises ====
The Chapman family continued to own the property until his estate was settled in 1858. The shop at 87 George Street was retained by James' widow, Esther, but the family residence at 89 George Street was sold to James Kelly in April 1859; the purchase price was £2,700 (inclusive of other neighbouring properties). By this time the building had been converted to licensed premises trading under the sign of the Marine Hotel since 1853 under the management of the following licensees:

- 1853 – William Chapman
- 1854 – Richard Chapman
- 1856 – Samuel Miller
- 1858 – James G. Chapman or Christopher Chapman

The impetus for Chapman's move into the licensed hotel trade undoubtedly was associated with the discovery of gold and the wealth generated in the southern and western goldfields of NSW. In the gold rush decades of the 1850s and 1860s, businesses in the City readily met the demands for accommodation and other services and goods generated by the influx of gold seeking migrants. The association between The Rocks and the sea and seafarers is also clearly demonstrated in the name of the hotel. This association is also demonstrated in the establishment of the Sydney Sailors' Home in 1865 and the Bethel Chapel (Mariners' Church) in 1859, both fronting George Street and near the Orient Hotel.

=== Ownership by James Kelly ===
While James Kelly continued to own the hotel until 1876 the hotel was managed by a succession of publicans, inclusive of:

- 1860 – Henry S. Green
- 1859, 1861–1867 – William Jonathan Green
- 1868 – Vacant
- 1869–1871 – Catherine Brown
- 1873 – Samuel Reeve
- 1875–1876 – Mrs Delia Reeve

=== Ownership by Gustave Buckham ===
Kelly sold the hotel to Gustave Buckham in March 1876 for £2,400. Buckham then renamed it Buckham's Hotel. Buckham evidently arranged for alterations to the hotel increasing the number of rooms to 21 from the 10 under Kelly's ownership. As with the previous ownership, Buckham managed the hotel through a succession of publicans. This practice resulted in the frequent renaming of the hotel, evidently to entice trade on the good reputation of the publican. Over 1877-79 it was known as Buckham's, and then May's Family Hotel under publican James H. May until 1881, Pries' Family Hotel between 1882 and 1883, and Brown's Family Hotel under Peter Brown. These publicans had long standing associations with Sydney's hotel trade. John H. P. Pries for example had started in the trade at the now demolished Woolpack Inn in Haymarket. He then opened the Pries' Family Hotel and afterwards moved back to southern end of the town to manage the Golden Gate on Brickfield Hill.

In 1885 the hotel was renamed the Orient under the new licensee Walter McCombie. The name change reflects the broader changes occurring in the wharf area relating to the development of Campbell's Wharf, which had been sold in 1876 to the Australasian Steam Navigation Company. (ASN Co.). The ASN Co. rebuilt the wharf and moved its operations from Darling Harbour and also it to international shipping companies. From 1877 the steamers of the Orient Steam Navigation Line berthed here, hence, evidently, the name of the hotel. The licensees after McCombie were:

- 1886–1887 – John Hennessy
- 1888–1893 – Peter Brown (the same Peter Brown as above)
- 1894 – Arthur H. Lack
- 1895 – D. Davies
- 1896 – Peter Roseby
- 1897 – George Gardiner
- 1898–1899 – Jane Jones
- 1900–01 – J. De Mery
- 1902–03 – Berkley Dawson
- 1904 – Leonard C. Kennan
- 1905–1917 – John Bolsdon
- 1918–1919 – Robert C. West
- 1920–1921 – Michael Ryan

=== Ownership and use of 87 George Street ===
The residential nature of The Rocks area is demonstrated at the Orient Hotel site in the shop/store (now removed) at 87 George Street. The Chapmans retained this property until November 1861 when the trustee for the late James Chapman sold it to Thomas Andrew Drysdale of Melbourne for £825. Drysdale retained ownership until the resumption in 1900. Over this period the premises housed a diverse range of uses that in many instances used the rear yard area to undertake light manufacturing. The uses were inclusive of the following:

- 1858 – James Chapman, butcher
- 1861 – E. Chapman
- 1863 – Thomas Hunter, poultry dealer
- 1864 – Henry Harris, fruiterer
- 1865–1868 – Law & Tinsley, hay & corn dealer
- 1869 – George Law, produce store
- 1870 – George Walburn, hay and corn dealer
- 1871 – Vacant
- 1873 – Daniel Cahill
- 1875–1876 – Charles Banern, boarding house
- 1877–1880 – Mrs Mary Boddy, fruiterer
- 1882 – William House, butcher
- 1883 – Vacant
- 1884–97 – Alexander McLeod, brass founder, plumber, blacksmith. The Canonside Foundry
- 1898 – No listing
- 1899 – Jim Lee, laundry
- 1900 – William Schneider, bootmaker
- 1901 – No listing
- 1902–03 – C. Gaudron, laundry
- 1904 – No Listing
- 1905 – Joseph Thiering, yachtsmith
- 1906–07 – Janitzky & Fletcher, assayers and analysts
- 1908–1914 – J. R. Reid, boot polish manufacturer
- 1915–1918 – John E. Hunt, electrical engineer
- 1919–1924 – R. M. Crabbe, oil brokers, oil and varnish manufacturer
- 1925–1930 – Graham and Pinder, carpenters and joiners

=== Acquisition of head lease by Tooth & Co ===
A longstanding use of note here is Alexander McLeod's Canonside Foundry that operated for most of the 1880s and 1890s as it relates to the provision of marine engineering services. Initially the commercial licensed operation continued under the management of the publicans listed above. Around 1920 Resch's Limited entered into a head-lease with the Housing Board over the property. Associated with the coming of Resch's was the completion in 1922 of major additions to the hotel. This work was undertaken for the Housing Board, William Henry Foggitt being its architect at the time. This was the first of a number of alterations undertaken over the following years in 1929, in 1940 and 1961. The role of the hotel in this era continued as both licensed premises and as a place of accommodation. In 1930 the head lease was acquired by Tooth and Co. and then in 1948 it was taken on by British Breweries Pty Ltd. Over this period and up to the 1970s the licensees were held by:

- 1922–1934 – Frances Cooper
- 1935–1942 – J. Rohan
- 1942 – G. E. Edworthy
- 1943–1945 – A. Walker
- 1945 – (Mrs) A. N. Carey
- 1945 – P. J. O'Gorman
- 1946–1948 – (Mrs) J. Overall
- 1948 – H. C. Erickson
- 1948–1950 – E. J. Ward
- 1950 – E. G. Black
- 1951–1957 – J. Myerson
- 1957 – H. O. Hall
- 1957 – R. Martin
- 1958–1960 – J. T. A. Moon
- 1960 – Mr Gibbs
- 1960 – K. D. Foster
- 1960 – J. A. Gibson
- 1961 – W. J. C. Luscombe
- 1962 – Mrs Debus
- 1962 – A. L. & T. A. Cawood
- 1963–1969 – J. H. Button
- 1969 – M. J. Hicks
- 1969 – (Mrs) M. M. Hutchings

=== Resumption by the NSW Government ===
While The Rocks was administered parsimoniously by the government, the potential of West Circular Quay for international shipping and for its administration headquarters was actively pursued. In the decades following the World War II the Maritime Services Board built a new international passenger terminal in 1961 and new administrative offices in the mid-1950s. Coincidental with the shipping terminal development was a change in the management of the Orient Hotel with the head-lease being taken on by Miller's Brewery Pty. Ltd. in 1960. Miller's were formerly British Breweries Ltd. with the new company being founded by Robert W. Miller around 1951. Over the 1950s and 1960s the brewery provided serious competition to Tooths and Tooheys who traditionally dominated the Sydney market. Their former brewery still stands atop Taverners Hill on the Parramatta Road at Petersham. Miller's ownership would seem to have had only a marginal impact on the building with only the bar area being altered in 1961.

Since the mid-1970s the Orient Hotel has undergone numerous changes to enhance the popularity of the hotel to the broader public. The changes were overseen by the government authorities of the Sydney Cove Redevelopment Authority(SCRA), Sydney Cove Authority (SCA) and its successor the Sydney Harbour Foreshore Authority (SHFA). The SCRA was established by the Robert Askin-led Liberal Coalition government in 1968 and came into being in January 1970. Its origins date to the mid-1960s and the instigation of concept plans (the Wallace (1964) and Overall (1967) Schemes) for the redevelopment of The Rocks to provide high-rise office and residential blocks. The new Authority was given most of the state-owned property in The Rocks, with a charter to restore, renovate and redevelop the area. Public disquiet about the future direction of The Rocks under SCRA erupted in 1973 in organised community protests supported by the NSW Branch of the Builders Labourers' Federation. By 1975, SCRA's planning outlook had evolved to take into consideration cultural, social and historical values, but large scale developments continued.

The Orient Hotel with its corner location and historic street presentation has contributed to the public's association of The Rocks with a unique historic neighbourhood. Around 1976, a company named Rocks Hotels Pty Ltd. took on the management of the hotel and in 1979 extensive alterations valued at $120,000 were completed to provide street facades approximating its nineteenth-century appearance and undertake alterations to the basement, ground and first floors. The architects were Colin Graham and Partners Pty Ltd. There were other changes over the 1980s as follows:

- 1980 – Renewal of veranda and stairway
- 1981 – Reconstruction of the street paving lightwells
- 1983 – Removal of an internal wall
- 1984 – Relocation of entry doors and alterations to the bar

Another major change came in 1988, the bicentennial year, again for Rocks Hotels Pty Ltd. This work, valued at $1,500,000, was designed by architects Howard Tanner and Associates Pty Ltd.

== Description ==
The hotel follows the typical late Colonial Georgian mould of corner siting, a curved corner facade with plain parapeted walls, smaller windows on the top floor than lower floors, and glazed in a twelve pane pattern. The building is constructed of stuccoed brick walls, timber floors, roof and joinery, it retained this form until 1920 when a three bayed western addition was built and in 1930 a single bay to the north was added together with awnings and wall tiling.

=== Modifications and dates ===
- 1848: Addition of brick stable with two-roomed loft and open wooden shed; 1864-78 - external walls faced with cement render;
- 1922: Major extensions (Argyle Street) over site of stable, shed, courtyard (minor changes to original premises);
- 1930: Shop/sheds demolished; 1930s: Additions on George Street shop site; 1840s: Ground floor altered with enlarged bar, externally modified;
- 1978: Extensive renovations, interior/exterior restored to original elevation as far as practical, doors/windows restored to original width;
- 1981: Awning removed;
- 1988: Internal alterations removed much original fabric.

== Heritage listing ==
The Orient Hotel is a place of cultural significance at a state level for its historical importance, its scientific potential and its rarity. It is a place of cultural significance at a local level for its aesthetic qualities, social associations and its representative values.

The Orient Hotel is one of the oldest surviving hotels in the city. It commenced operations as the Marine Hotel and has traded through to the present day. Originally built as a residence c. 1842, the building was converted to licensed premises, a relatively common practice during the first half of the 19th century. It has since been modified and added to in response to changes in laws, social and commercial pressures, but retains its external form and Georgian character. The building also retains early fabric elements, which are rare and able to demonstrate Colonial construction. The building's remnant form and layout has high research potential in determining patterns of use as a residence and hotel in the Georgian period. The site may also have potential archaeological value as the location of the former convict hospital.

The building is part of the Colonial context of commercial, residential and industrial infrastructure that developed around the wharf as an early port facility in Sydney. The surrounding context contains many Georgian and early Victorian buildings, forming an important early streetscape, of which the Orient Hotel is an intrinsic part as a prominent corner site. This Georgian character has been emphasised by reconstruction work that illustrates the conservation ethos of the Sydney Cove Redevelopment Authority. The Orient Hotel is a good example of a Colonial Georgian hotel that has later sympathetic layers of Federation Georgian detailing. It retains its visual relationship to and from surrounding historic properties. Significant views and vistas are maintained to and from George Street, Argyle Street and Circular Quay.

Orient Hotel was listed on the New South Wales State Heritage Register on 10 May 2002 having satisfied the following criteria.

The place is important in demonstrating the course, or pattern, of cultural or natural history in New South Wales.

The Orient Hotel is significant as one of the oldest surviving working licensed hotels in the city that continues to trade. The hotel commenced operations in 1851 as the Marine Hotel (later the Orient Hotel). The building demonstrates the conversion of a residence into licensed premises during the first half of the 19th century, a relatively common practice. The Orient Hotel has an historic association with the former docklands and is part of the context of development demonstrating early residential and commercial infrastructure patterns related to the port.

The Orient Hotel provides evidence of the changing function of hotels from the mid-19th century to the present day. The alterations to the fabric of the building that have removed parlours, accommodation facilities, amongst other changes, demonstrate changing patterns of licensing laws and social attitudes. The hotel now provides community based activity based on the gentrification and tourist function of The Rocks area. The Orient Hotel meets this criterion at State Level.

The place has a strong or special association with a person, or group of persons, of importance of cultural or natural history of New South Wales's history.

The Orient Hotel is significant for its associations with Mary Reiby and Frederick Wright Unwin who constructed the adjacent Unwin's Stores. It is also associated with James Chapman who built the original shop and residence on the site, and Tooth & Co. a major brewer and lessee of hotels throughout NSW in the 19th and early 20th century. The Orient Hotel meets this criterion at local level.

The place is important in demonstrating aesthetic characteristics and/or a high degree of creative or technical achievement in New South Wales.

The Orient Hotel is significant as a fine example of a Colonial Georgian hotel located on a prominent corner site. Although many of the original features have been lost the external form, scale and Georgian character remain intact. The building retains examples of Colonial craftsmanship that are now rare. It has been modified sympathetically, but much of the significant interior has been lost. It occupies an important townscape location situated between the Argyle Bond Stores, Cadman's Cottage and as part of the context of Georgian buildings in George Street. It is an important corner element within the historically significant streetscape of George and Argyle Streets which has now been presented as a Colonial streetscape and a popular tourist destination. The architectural form of the original 1840s building is an important surviving example of a once prevalent architectural expression on street corners in the area. The hotel is an example of the utilisation of prominent corner sites for hotel premises in The Rocks in the 19th century.

The setting of the Orient Hotel within the historic landscape of The Rocks represents the practices of 19th-century hotel design in Australia retaining its Colonial character within a high-density precinct. It retains visual relationships to and from surrounding historic properties. Its prominent corner location retains significant views and vistas to and from George Street, Argyle Street and Circular Quay. The Orient Hotel is part of a collection of buildings in The Rocks that form part of a group of places of very high aesthetic value. It is part of a group that meets this criterion at State level.

The Orient Hotel meets this criterion at Local Level.

The place has a strong or special association with a particular community or cultural group in New South Wales for social, cultural or spiritual reasons.

The Orient Hotel is significant as a major social venue in the area for over 150 years forming part of a network of hotels along George Street and the greater area of The Rocks. It has continuously provided a social and recreational venue since the 1850s and accommodation until 1976 reflecting the evolving social character of the area during the 19th and early 20th century.

The Sydney Cove Redevelopment Authority was created to restore a large portion of The Rocks development area under a series of guidelines designed to maintain and enhance the perceived 19th-century character of the area. The partial reconstruction of the hotel to an earlier known state during the 1970s reflects the Authority's scheme. The hotel represents the State Government's recognition of heritage significant places and heritage values. It represents the conservation practices of the time which sought to return historically significant buildings to their original condition and eradicate gradual and significant additions which were not contemporary with the building style intended, in this case late-Georgian. The Orient Hotel meets this criterion at local level.

The place has potential to yield information that will contribute to an understanding of the cultural or natural history of New South Wales.

The Orient hotel has a layering of periods of construction and architectural styles that demonstrates past approaches to design and detailing. Its siting and setting also demonstrates 19th-century urban principles. The building layout of the hotel has the ability to demonstrate past commercial and hotel practices. Documentary evidence indicates archaeological potential on the property potentially providing insights into past occupation and use particularly associated with the Convict Hospital and later as a working yard for the residence and shop. The Orient Hotel meets this criterion at State Level.

The place possesses uncommon, rare or endangered aspects of the cultural or natural history of New South Wales.

The Orient Hotel is significant as one of the rare early surviving hotels in the state still in operation from the 1850s. The building retains fabric elements from this period that now offer a rare insight into Colonial design, construction and stylistic features. The Orient Hotel meets this criterion at State Level.

The place is important in demonstrating the principal characteristics of a class of cultural or natural places/environments in New South Wales.

The Orient Hotel forms part of a network of early hotel in The Rocks/Millers Point area. The hotel represents a pattern of historic uses of commercial and hotel operations that was a key character/element of the district. The Orient Hotel meets this criterion at local level.

== See also ==
- Australian non-residential architectural styles
