= Edmund Resch =

German-Australian brewer

- Born: 9 June 1847; Germany
- Died: 22 May 1923 (aged 75)
- Burial place: Waverley Cemetery
- Notable work: Resch's Limited

Edmund Resch (9 June 1847 – 22 May 1923) was a German-Australian brewer. He founded and operated the successful brewing company Resch's Limited, the name of which survives today as beer brand Resch's.

== Early years ==
Resch was the son of Johann Nicolaus Resch, ironmaster, and his wife Julia Bernhardine Louise Wilhelmine, née Heitmann, both of Saxony. He was born in Hörde in Westphalia, Kingdom of Prussia and migrated to Australia in 1863 at age 16, reportedly to evade compulsory military service. He was a miner in Victoria and a succession of rural towns in New South Wales in the early 1870s before building and operating a hotel in Charters Towers in Queensland for four years.

== Brewing industry and commercial interests ==
In c. 1877, Resch began producing beverages when he bought a cordial and aerated water factory at Wilcannia in far western New South Wales with one of his brothers. In 1883, they purchased a brewery at Cootamundra and named it the Lion Brewery, opening branches at Silverton and Tibooburra, but dissolved the partnership in 1885, after which Resch retained the Wilcannia interests and returned to brewing there. He appointed a manager to the brewery and moved to Melbourne in 1892.

In 1895, he returned to direct involvement in the brewing trade when he moved to Sydney to work as manager of Allt's Brewing & Wine and Spirit Co. Ltd. He purchased the company himself in 1897 and bought out rival New South Wales Lager Bier Brewing Co. Ltd. in 1900, rebranding each under the Resch's name. Following the NSW Lager Bier Brewing Co. purchase, he centralised brewing operations at their former base in Dowling St, Redfern, shifting the former Allt's operations from their Waverley base but retaining the Waverley Brewery name. In 1906, he incorporated Resch's Limited as a vehicle for his now substantial brewing interests.

He was consul in Sydney for the Government of the Netherlands from 1903 to 1913. Upon his retirement, he was appointed as a member of the Order of Orange-Nassau in 1913.

== Experience during World War I ==
Resch was partially blinded after suffering an injury at sea while returning from a visit to Germany in 1913. He returned to Germany for treatment and was there at the commencement of World War I, but fled after being threatened with internment by German authorities and returned to Australia.

He financially supported the Australian war effort in World War I, contributing over £3000 and topping up the military salaries of Resch's workers who enlisted, but was nonetheless interned in Holsworthy Internment Camp in 1917 at the behest of Minister for Defence George Pearce, one of a number of German businessmen to be targeted. He was hospitalised while at Holsworthy due to poor health, and was shifted to home internment at his Darling Point residence in March 1918, remaining there until the end of the war. It was reported during his internment that he had been ill for "eight or ten years" and was "living in retirement" and that his sons, Edmund and Arnold Resch, had been conducting the business.

== Death ==
Resch died in 1923 and was buried at Waverley Cemetery. He left an estate valued at £316,829. His sons took over the business upon his death, but it collapsed in 1929 and was purchased by Tooth & Co. His family property, Swifts, which he owned from 1899 until his death, is listed on the New South Wales State Heritage Register.
