= Pirrama Park ferry wharf =

Ferry wharf in Sydney

Pirrama Park
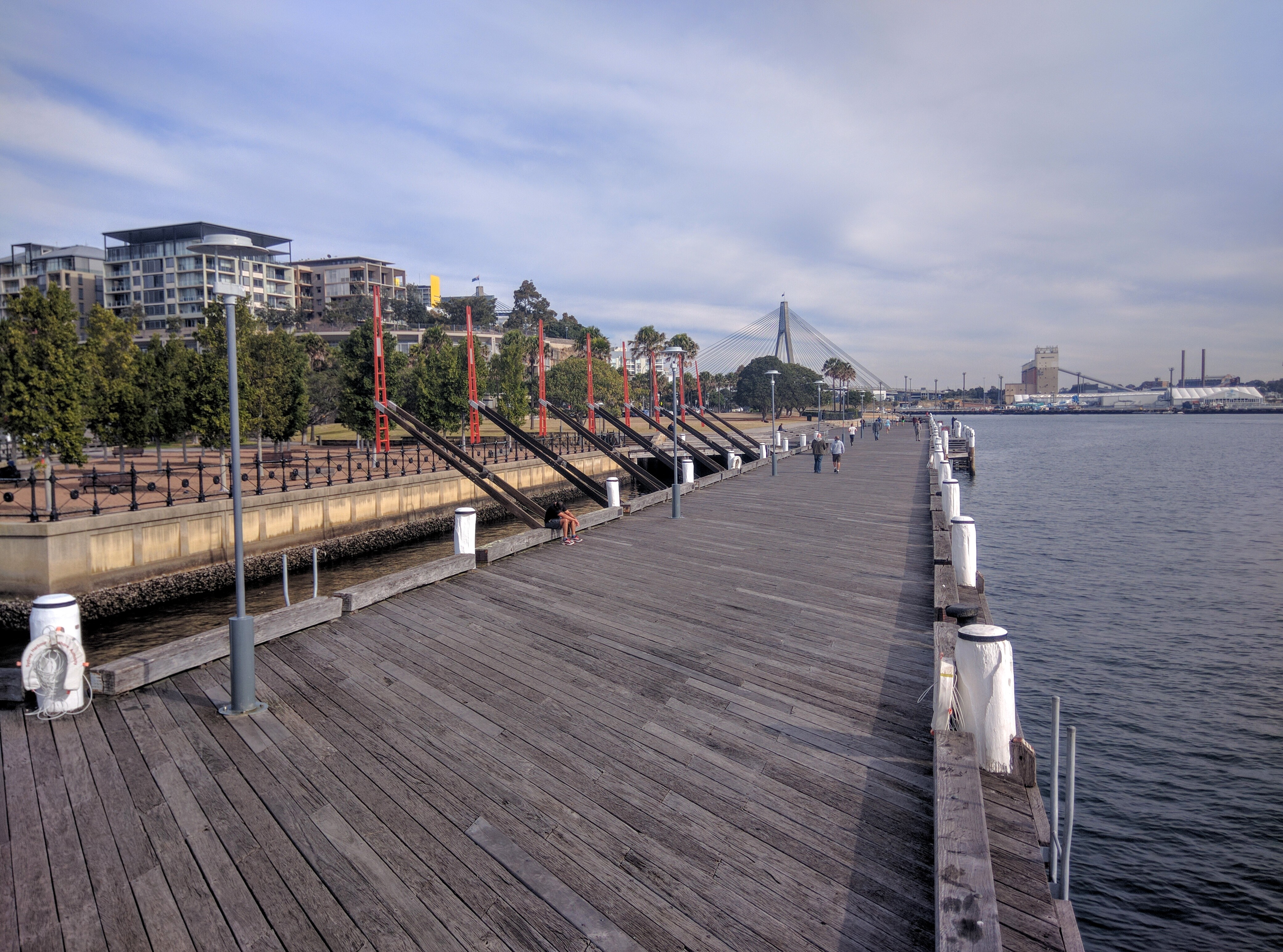
- Site of current wharf in 2016

General information
- Location: Pirrama Road, Pyrmont; New South Wales; Australia
- Coordinates: 33°51′52.631″S 151°11′28.85″E
- Owner: Transport for NSW
- Operator: Transdev Sydney Ferries
- Platforms: 1 wharf (1 berth)
- Connections: Pirrama Road, Harris Street; John Street Square

Other information
- Status: Unstaffed

History
- Opened: 7 April 2025

Services
Preceding wharf	Sydney Ferries	Following wharf
Barangaroo Terminus	F10 Blackwattle Bay	Blackwattle Bay Terminus
Location

Pirrama Park ferry wharf is a public pontoon and ferry wharf located on Elizabeth Macarthur Bay, serving the Sydney suburb of Pyrmont. As of 2026, it is one of the newest ferry wharves in Sydney, opening on 7 April 2025. It is served by the F10 Blackwattle Bay ferry route, operated by Transdev Sydney Ferries.

== History ==
The F10 Blackwattle Bay line was introduced in its current form in November 2021 in response to the temporary closure of the Inner West Light Rail. Initially the only stops on the route were Blackwattle Bay and Barangaroo. The service was made a permanent part of the Sydney Ferry network in 2022 and in April 2025, the Elizabeth Macarthur Bay Pontoon at Pirrama Park, Pyrmont was added as a stop on the line. On 30 March 2026, the F10 Blackwattle Bay line was added to the Opal network.

== Wharves and services ==
Platform	Line	Stopping pattern	Notes
1	F10	Services to Barangaroo & Blackwattle Bay	
