= Blackwattle Bay ferry wharf =

Ferry wharf in Sydney

Blackwattle Bay
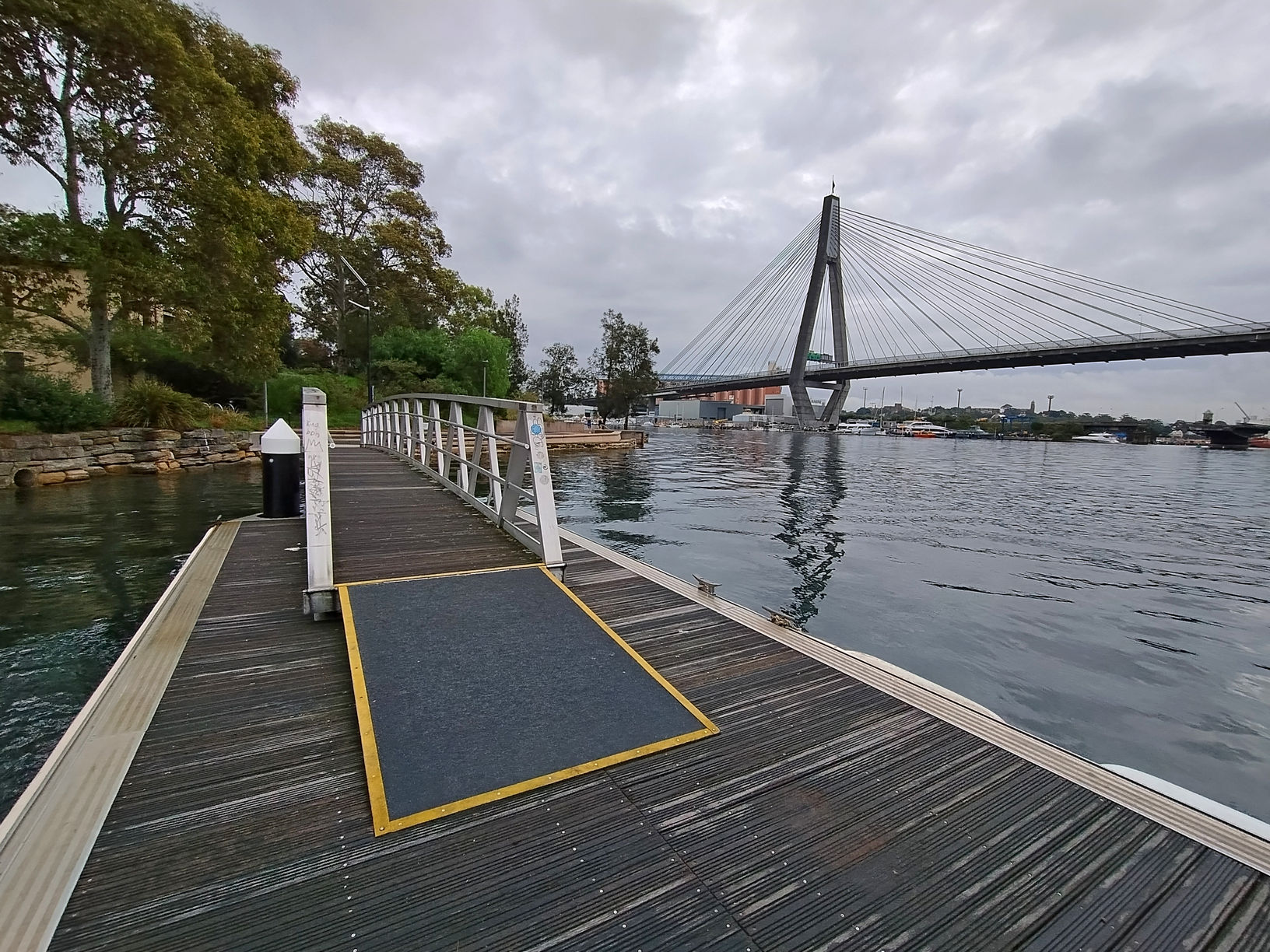
- View of the wharf in March 2026

General information
- Location: Leichhardt Street, Glebe; New South Wales; Australia
- Coordinates: 33°52′16.4″S 151°11′7.03″E
- Owner: Transport for NSW
- Operator: Transdev Sydney Ferries
- Platforms: 1 wharf (1 berth)
- Connections: Leichhardt Street, Glebe Point Road

Other information
- Status: Unstaffed

History
- Opened: November 2021

Services
Preceding wharf	Sydney Ferries	Following wharf
Pirrama Park towards Barangaroo	F10 Blackwattle Bay	Terminus
Location

Blackwattle Bay ferry wharf is a public pontoon and ferry wharf located on Blackwattle Bay, serving the Sydney suburb of Glebe. It is served by the F10 Blackwattle Bay ferry route, operated by Transdev Sydney Ferries.

== History ==
Blackwattle Bay wharf opened in November 2021 when the F10 Blackwattle Bay ferry route was introduced in response to the temporary closure of the Inner West Light Rail. It became a permanent service in 2022, and was added to the Opal network on 30 March 2026.

== Wharves and services ==
Platform	Line	Stopping pattern	Notes
1	F10	Services to Barangaroo	
