= Resch's =

Australian beer brand

Coordinates: 33.8967432°S 151.2152146°E

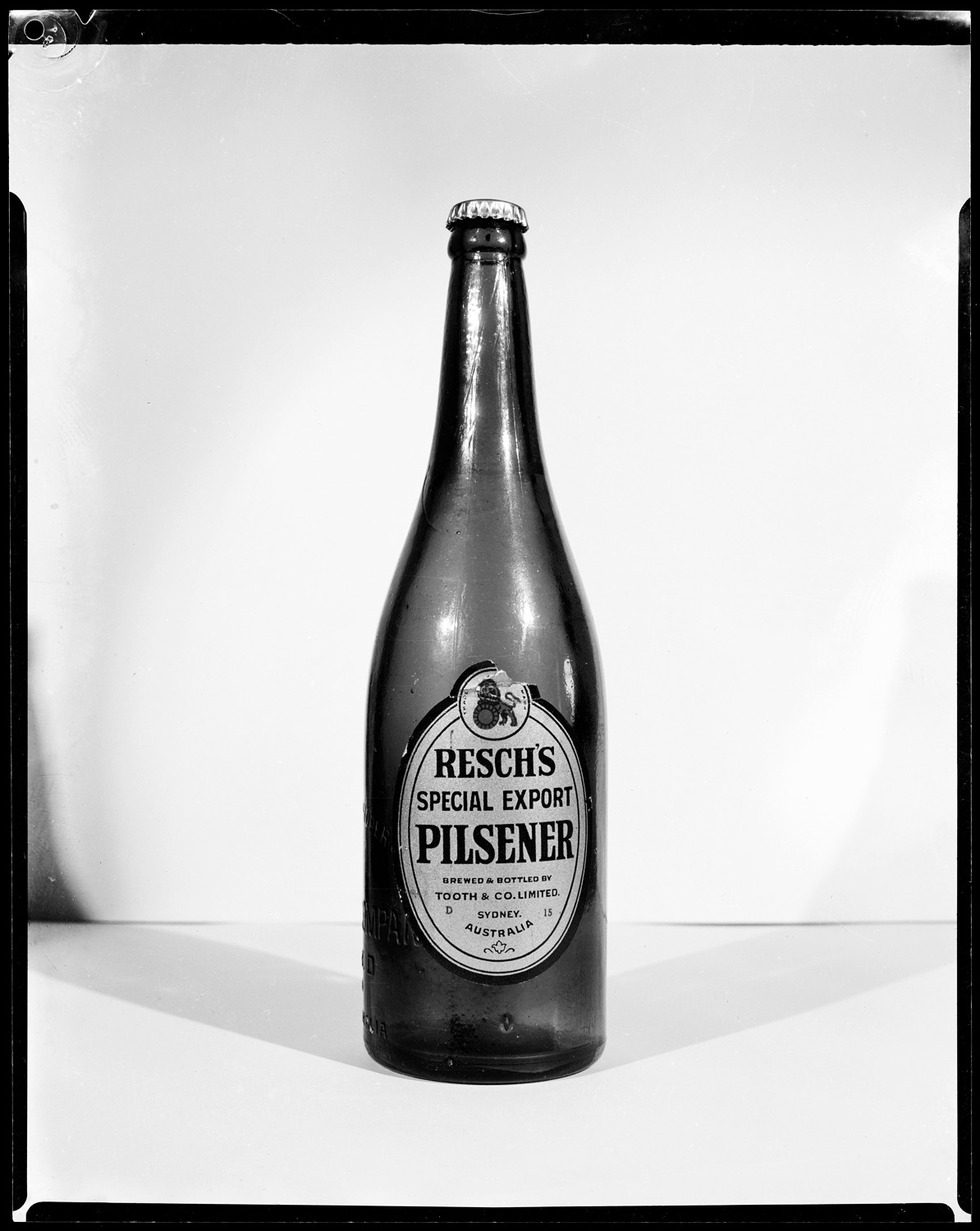
Photograph from 1952, label says: "Resch's Special Export Pilsener, brewed & bottled by Tooth & C.O. Limited. Sydney, Australia"

Resch's is a brand of beer produced by Carlton & United Breweries, available in New South Wales, Australia. It was also the name of the Sydney brewing company who produced the beer brand and were based in Redfern until taken over by Tooth & Co in 1929.

== History ==
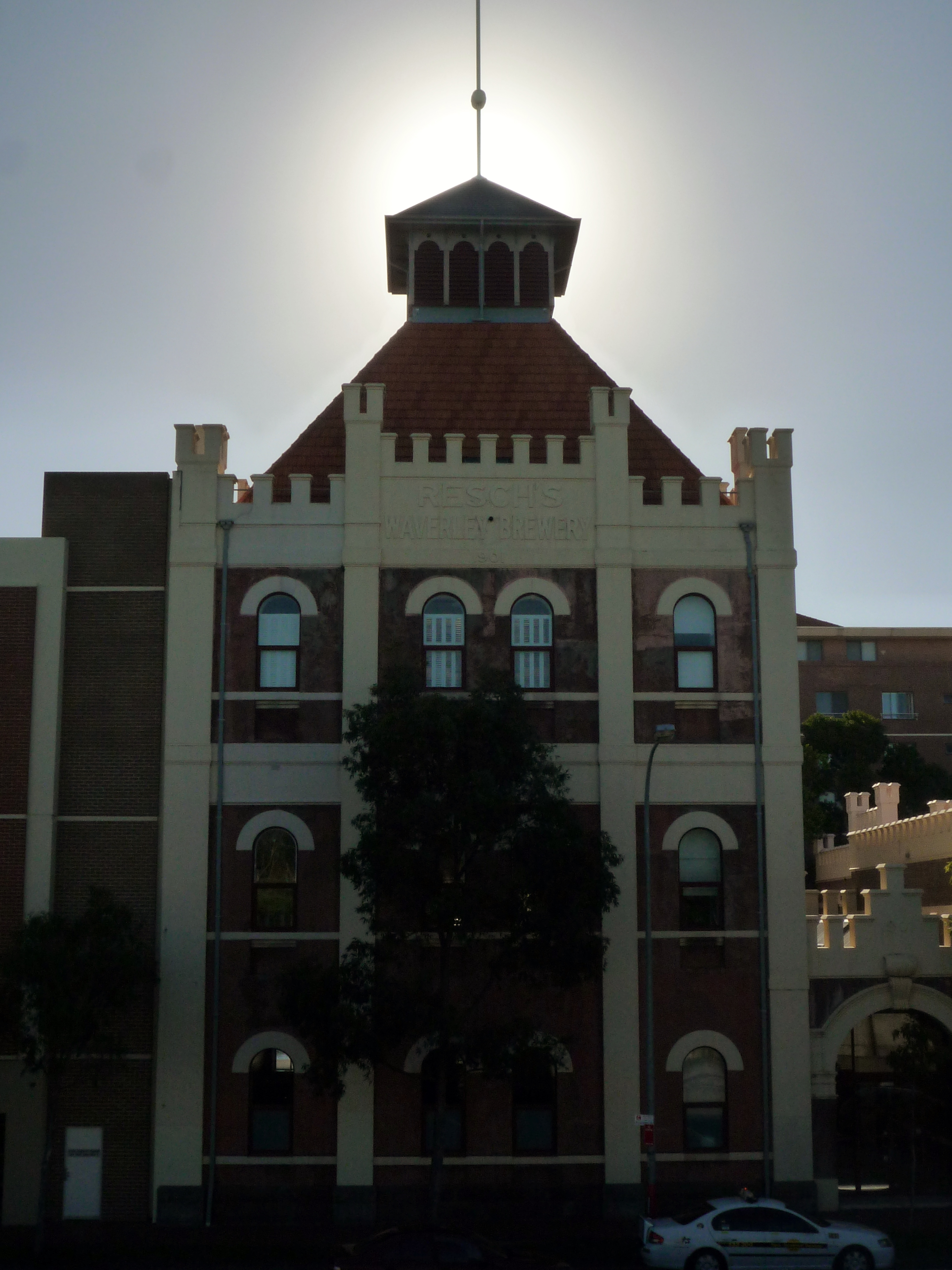
A building which was a brewery for Resch's now part of an apartment complex.

Resch's Limited was a Sydney-based brewery founded by Edmund Resch. The company collapsed in 1929, at which time it was taken over by Tooth & Co The name lived on in the brands of beer that continued to be produced. Waverley Brewery closed in 1983, and was redeveloped into the Moore Park Gardens Apartment Development by Dealruby in the 1990s. By the 2000s Resch's DB (Double Bitter) and DA (Dinner Ale) had been phased out of production.

== Current status ==
Carlton & United Breweries currently produces Resch's Draught for the New South Wales hotel market. It is also available in a small number of venues in South East Queensland. Resch's Pilsener is available in 750ml bottles (known as "longnecks") and 375ml cans throughout the New South Wales and available nationally via online retailers.

Resch's Real Bitter was discontinued in mid-2018 joining other retired varieties including Dinner Ale (DA), Smooth Black Ale, Extra Stout, Premium Lager, Premier Lager, Sydney Bitter and Double Bitter (DB). Dinner Ale made a limited return in 2022, also in 375mL cans like the Pilsener, and is available only through Liquorland and First Choice Liquor.

In January 2012, Carlton & United Breweries released a limited edition of Resch's Draught in 24 can cartons, using the old green and white labelling as well as the "Resch's Lion" adorning the top of each can.

== Reschs Appreciation Society ==
On 27 February 2009, the Resch's Appreciation Society was formed. This has grown steadily in membership over 10 years and contained approximately 9,000 members as of November 2020. The group regularly meets to socialise and raise money for men's health through the Movember Foundation.

== Revival ==
Despite a lack of advertising or investment from its current owner, Resch's has been growing in popularity in recent years. On 16 September 2019, Resch's was voted Australia's favourite beer in a news.com.au poll. While speculation has continued regarding the main reason for this, the loyalty of Resch's drinkers in the face of the brand's uncool image as 'old man's beer' is remarkable, having retained a core of consumers despite the explosion in marketing of craft beers.

== See also ==
- Australian pub
- Beer in Australia
- List of breweries in Australia
