= The Maltings =

Malthouse complex in New South Wales, Australia

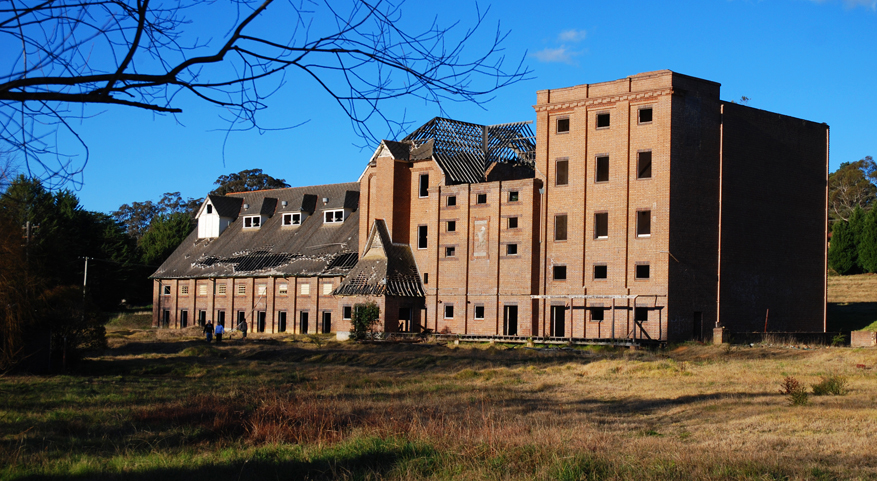
- Picture of Malthouse 3
- Interactive map of the The Maltings area
- Alternative names: The Maltings

General information
- Location: Mittagong, Australia
- Coordinates: 34.4482°S 150.4587°E
- Elevation: 631m
- Construction started: 30 Jan 1899
- Completed: Aug 1899
- Cost: £8,496 tender
- Owner: Malting Company of New South Wales (Limited)

Design and construction
- Architect: Mr. Timothy T. Connor – 1913 expansion
- Main contractor: Stuart Brothers of Sydney

The Mittagong Maltings was a large three-malthouse complex first established in 1899 by the Malting Company of New South Wales, Australia, to supply malt to breweries throughout the state. The Maltings site is listed as a local council heritage item.

== Location ==
Located northeast of the current Mittagong railway station, The Maltings consist of imposing buildings that were established next to the Main Southern Railway and Nattai Creek.

== Early times ==
A vacant area of the current Oaklands Estate was acquired in 1898 by the Malting Company of NSW. In 1899 an imposing yet dignified malthouse was constructed between the railway line and Nattai Creek. Over the following eighteen years, two additional malthouses, storage silos, workshops and a manager's house were constructed. The first malthouse was completed in 1899 and started operation in August of that year. In 1905 the Malting Company of NSW accepted an offer from Tooth & Co. to purchase the Mittagong Maltings and the original company was wound up. In 1906, Tooth & Co. constructed a second malthouse that was located to the north of the first malthouse and was a reverse image of the original. The third malt house, located across Nattai creek from the other two, began operations in 1916.

== Later ==
From 1916 until 1942 the three malt houses were more or less in continuous production with additional ancillary buildings erected and improvements in amenities provided. A light rail and pedestrian bridge was provided as a crossing point over the Nattai creek to link Malthouse No. 1 & 2 with No. 3. Malthouse 1&2 were damaged extensively by fire in 1942. Production ceased in Malthouse 1 for over a year and Malthouse 2 for a decade. Malthouse 3 continued production throughout this time. Malthouse 1 was temporally repaired over the following twelve months and fuller repairs were made over the following years. Malthouse 2 was completely rebuilt and did not return to active production until 1953.

There was a temporary closure in 1948 due to weather conditions.

Another fire in 1969 closed Malthouse 1 permanently with all internal structure's removed. Production in Malthouse 2 & 3 continued until 1980 when a fire burnt out the silo and kiln roof section of Malthouse 3.

With hard times being felt by Tooth & Co., and the easily availability of subcontracting malters, the owners decided to close the Mittagong maltings and placed all holdings up for sale in 1981.

== Modern times ==
In 2019 the site was sold to Halcyons Hotels who plan to retain the buildings exterior whilst inside creating a multi-use facility. The entire site is now fenced off preventing public access.

== Gallery ==
- "Tooth and Co. Maltings". www.bleakscenes.net.
- "The Abandoned Tooth & Co. Brewery (Mittaging Maltings)". Abandoned Places.
