= Blackwattle Bay ferry service =

Ferry service in Sydney

F10 Blackwattle Bay

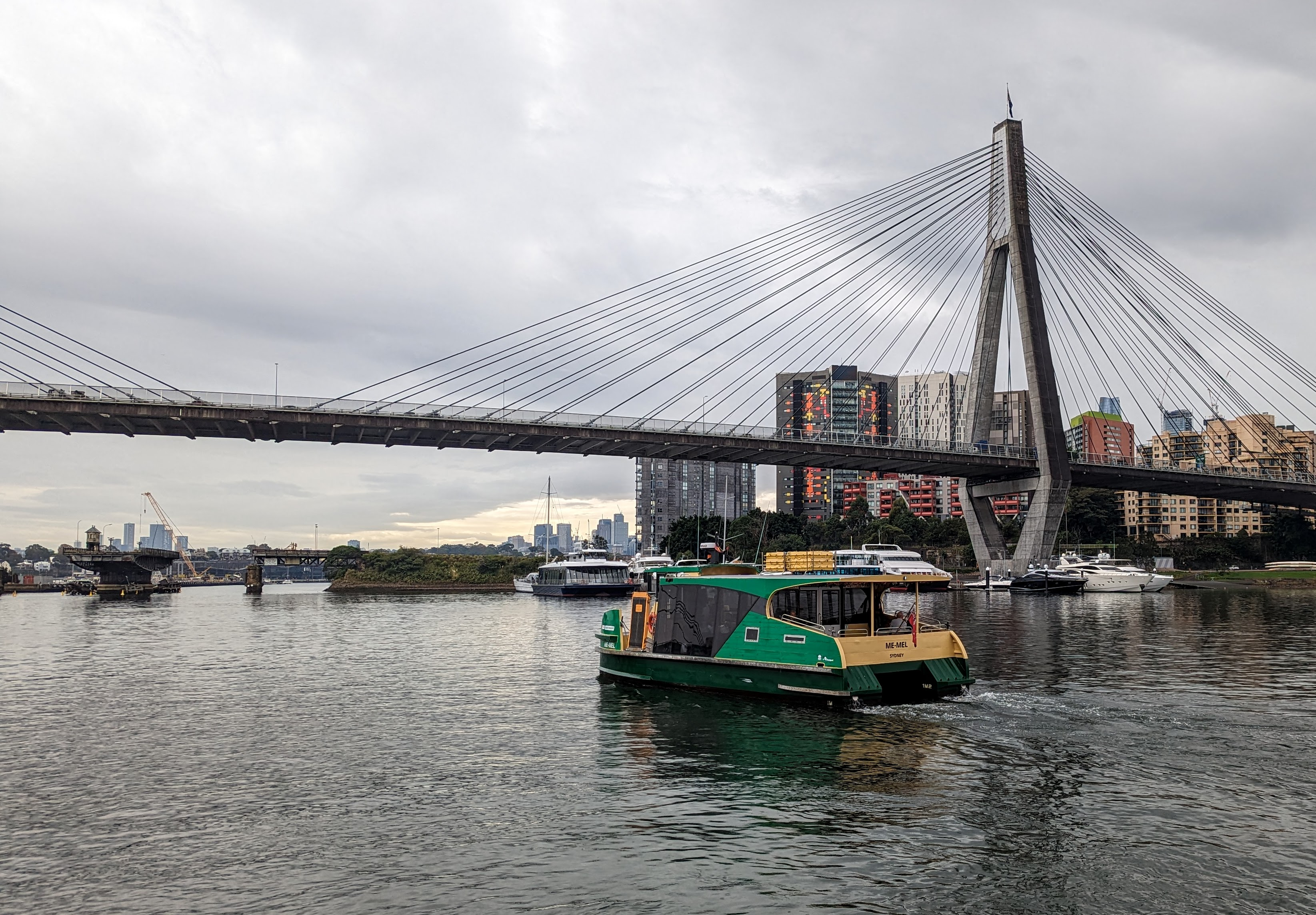
- The MiniCat "Me-Mel" ferry approaching the Anzac Bridge
- Waterway: Blackwattle Bay; Elizabeth Macarthur Bay; Darling Harbour
- Fleet: Minicat Ferry
- Owner: Sydney Ferries
- Operator: Transdev Sydney Ferries
- Began operation: November 2021
- System length: 3 wharves, 2.3km
- No. of vessels: 1
- Website: Transport for NSW

The Blackwattle Bay ferry service, officially known as F10 Blackwattle Bay, is a commuter ferry service in Sydney, New South Wales. Part of the Sydney Ferries network, it is operated by Transdev Sydney Ferries. The service operates between Barangaroo and Blackwattle Bay with one intermediate stop at Pirrama Park, taking 17 minutes.

== History ==
The service was initially introduced on 14 October 2019, as an on-demand service between four wharves, but was closed as a result of the COVID-19 pandemic. However, it was reintroduced in November 2021 as a timetabled service while the Inner West Light Rail was closed. In December 2022, the service was made permanent.

On 30 March 2026, the F10 service was integrated into the Opal network. Prior to this, patrons had to pay for their tickets on board using their credit or debit card. The government intended on incorporating the service into the Opal network by late 2025, but this was later delayed to 30 March 2026.

The Elizabeth Macarthur Bay public pontoon in Pirrama Park at the north end of Pyrmont was added as a stop on 7 April 2025. Transport for NSW refers to the new ferry stop as Pirrama Park wharf.

== Wharves ==
Name	Waterway	Suburbs served	Connections	Information on wharf	Photo of wharf
Barangaroo	Darling Harbour	Sydney CBD, Barangaroo	Parramatta River ferry service Pyrmont Bay ferry service	Barangaroo ferry wharf serves Darling Harbour, the Barangaroo precinct, and the western edge of the Sydney CBD. It is connected to Wynyard station by an underground pedestrian link, and is a short walk away from Barangaroo metro station. It features two large wharves, each with two berths on each side. Blackwattle Bay services typically use Wharf 2, Side A.	
Pirrama Park	Elizabeth Macarthur Bay	Pyrmont	none	Pirrama Park ferry wharf serves the suburb of Pyrmont, and is located on Pirrama Road near Pirrama Park. The stop was added to the line on 7 April 2025. It features a connection to the 389 bus on Pirrama Road, and is a short walk away from the light rail stop at John Street Square on the L1 Dulwich Hill line.	
Blackwattle Bay	Blackwattle Bay	Glebe	none	Blackwattle Bay ferry wharf serves the suburb of Glebe, and is located at the end of Leichhardt Street. It opened with the introduction of the F10 Blackwattle Bay line in November 2021.	

== Fleet ==
As of July 2026, there is one Minicat class ferry operating the F10 Blackwattle Bay line

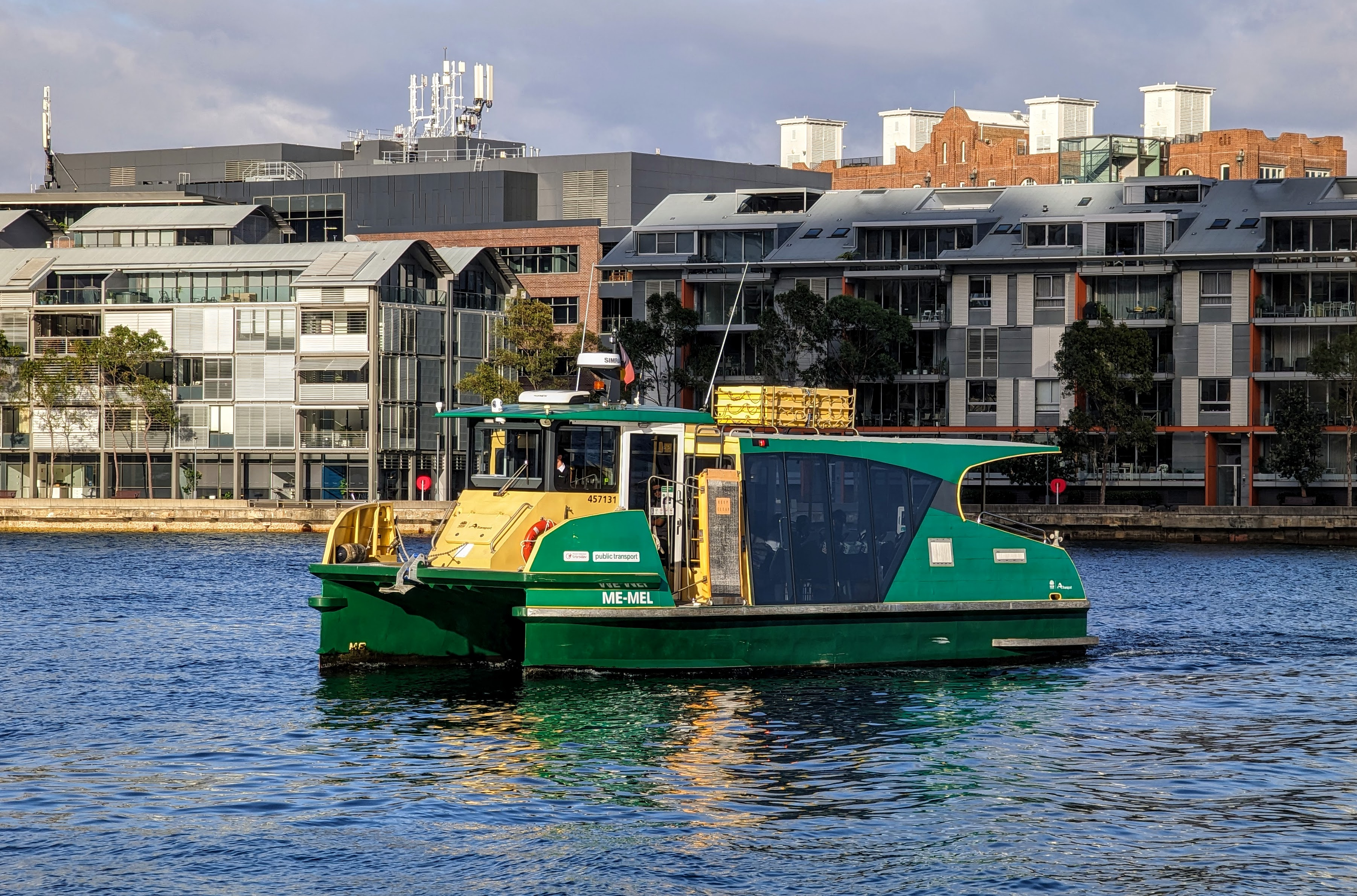
Minicat class ferry, since 2021
