= Bellevue, Glebe =

Bellevue
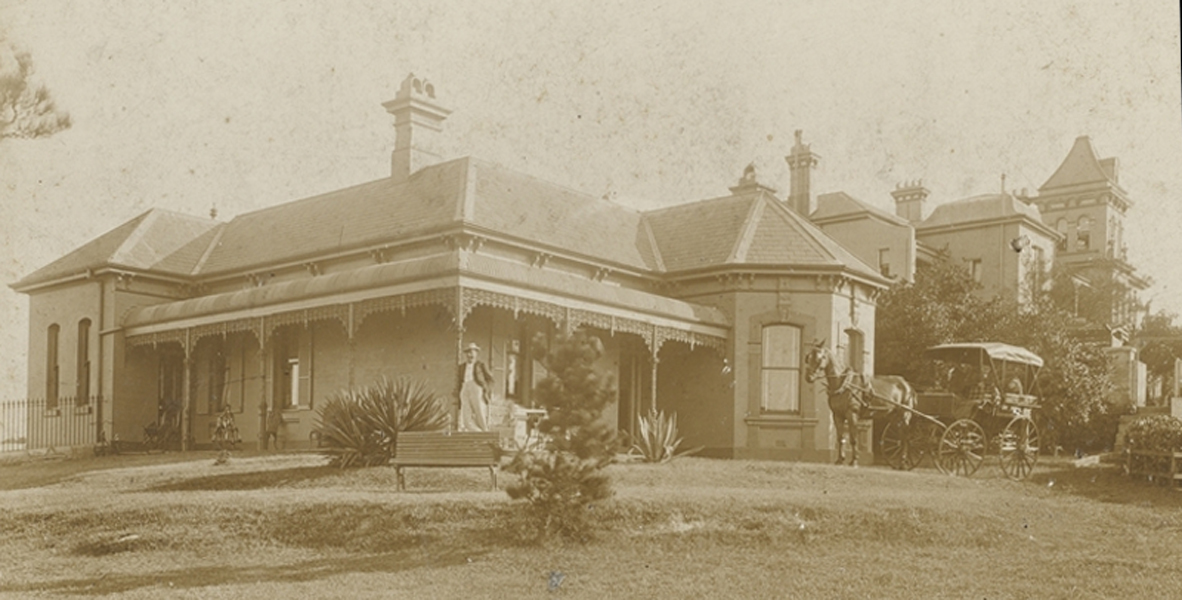
- Bellevue, Glebe 1899. The large house behind adjoining is Venetia

- Location within inner Sydney
- 33.8713°S 151.1845°E
- Location: 55–57 Leichhardt Street, Glebe Point, City of Sydney, New South Wales, Australia

History
- Built: 1896; 130 years ago
- Built for: William Jarrett

Site notes
- Architect: Ambrose Thornley Junior
- Architectural style: Victorian Italianate
- Owner: City of Sydney Council

New South Wales Heritage Register
- Official name: Bellevue; site of former Venetia (demolished); 55 Leichhardt Street
- Type: State heritage (complex / group)
- Designated: 2 April 1999
- Reference no.: 470
- Type: Villa
- Category: Residential buildings (private)

Bellevue is a heritage-listed former residence and timber yard and now cafe located at 55–57 Leichhardt Street in the inner city Sydney suburb of Glebe Point in the City of Sydney local government area of New South Wales, Australia. It was designed by Ambrose Thornley Junior and built in 1896 for William Jarrett who lived in the adjoining house. It is also known as site of former Venetia (demolished) and 55 Leichhardt Street. The property is owned by the City of Sydney Council. It was added to the New South Wales State Heritage Register on 2 April 1999.

== History ==
=== Indigenous history ===
The Leichhardt area was originally inhabited by the Wangal clan of Aborigines. After 1788 diseases such as smallpox and the loss of their hunting grounds caused huge reductions in their numbers and they moved further inland. Since European settlement the foreshores of Blackwattle Bay and Rozelle Bay have developed a unique maritime, industrial and residential character. A character which continues to evolve as areas which were originally residential estates, then industrial areas, are redeveloped for residential units and parklands.

=== Early Colonial history ===
The first formal grant in the Glebe area was a 162-hectare (400-acre) grant to Rev. Richard Johnson, the colony's first chaplain, in 1789. The Glebe (land allocated for the maintenance of a church minister) comprised rolling shale hills covering sandstone, with several sandstone cliff faces. The ridges were drained by several creeks including Blackwattle Creek, Orphan School Creek and Johnston Creek. Extensive swampland surrounded the creeks. On the shale ridges, heavily timbered woodlands contained several varieties of eucalypts while the swamplands and tidal mudflats had mangroves, swamp oaks (Casuarina glauca) and blackwattles (Callicoma serratifolia) after which the bay is named. Blackwattle Swamp was first mentioned by surveyors in the 1790s and Blackwattle Swamp Bay in 1807. By 1840 it was called Blackwattle Bay. Boat parties collected wattles and reeds for the building of huts, and kangaroos and emus were hunted by the early settlers who called the area the Kangaroo Ground. Rozelle Bay is thought to have been named after a schooner which once moored in its waters.

Johnson's land remained largely undeveloped until 1828, when the Church and School Corporation subdivided it into 28 lots, three of which they retained for church use.

The Church sold 27 allotments in 1828, north on the point and south around Broadway. The Church kept the middle section where the Glebe Estate is now. Up until the 1970s the Glebe Estate was in the possession of the Church.

On the point the sea breezes attracted the wealthy who built villas. The Broadway end attracted slaughterhouses and boiling down works that used the creek draining to Blackwattle Swamp. Smaller working-class houses were built around these industries. Abbattoirs were built there from the 1860s.

When Glebe was made a municipality in 1859 there were pro and anti-municipal clashes in the streets. From 1850 Glebe was dominated by wealthier interests.

Reclaiming the swamp, Wentworth Park opened in 1882 as a cricket ground and lawn bowls club. Rugby union football was played there in the late 19th century. The dog racing started in 1932. In the early 20th century modest villas were broken up into boarding houses as they were elsewhere in the inner city areas. The wealthier moved into the suburbs which were opening up through the railways. Up until the 1950s Sydney was the location for working class employment - it was a port and industrial city. By the 1960s central Sydney was becoming a corporate city with service-based industries - capital intensive not labour-intensive. A shift in demographics occurred, with younger professionals and technical and administrative people servicing the corporate city wanting to live close by. Housing was coming under threat and the heritage conservation movement was starting. The Fish Markets moved in during the 1970s. An influx of students came to Glebe in the 1960s and 1970s.

=== Bellevue ===
Most of the lots near Blackwattle Swamp were purchased for slaughterhouses and other noxious industries which had been forced out of the city. These included tanneries, copper smelting, pig yards and tobacco works. In contrast the elevated blocks to the north, with harbour views, became "villa retreats" where the prosperous middle class merchants escaped the crush of the city.

Alexander Brodie Spark (of Tusculum, Potts Point and Tempe House, Tempe) purchased this site as part of his 8-hectare (20-acre) lot in the Church subdivision of 1828. In the 1840s depression Spark became bankrupt and his land was sold.

By 1870 Mary Chisolm owned large portions of the original grant, and she commenced the subdivision and sale of the remaining lots in 1873. Ambrose Thornley owned a house near the point at this time (west of the Bellevue & Venetia lots), and a bathing house (later known as Homecroft) had been built c.1858 on the foreshore of the land owned by James Rothwell, immediately west of lot 45/Venetia). A second bathing house was built in the shallows of the adjacent (to Lot 45) foreshore.

==== William Jarrett ====
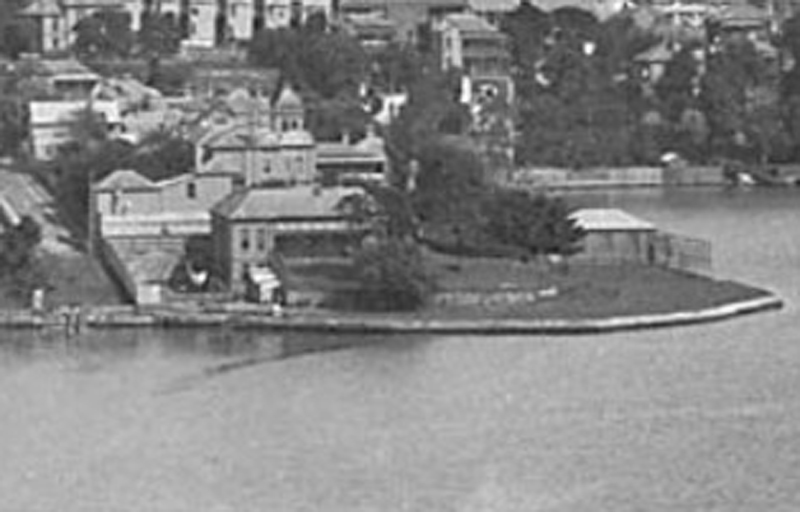
Bellevue on Blackwattle Bay foreshore c. 1900. The large house immediately behind with the tower is Venetia

Lots 45 & 46 adjacent to Rothwell's land were bought by William Jarrett in 1873, with a mortgage from the Industrial & Provident Permanent Benefit Building Society, of which Jarrett was manager. William Jarrett was born in Kent, England in 1829. In 1850 he married Margaret Roberts. Jarrett arrived in Sydney in 1853 with his wife and their two infant daughters aboard the ship Beejapore. Soon after their arrival in Sydney, Jarrett became licensee for the Tradesmen's Arms Hotel in Leichhardt. He was a publican until 1870 when he started his association with Industrial Buildings Societies. Over the next thirty years he acquired enormous amounts of land and property. His holdings are listed in an advertisement for the sale of his estate in 1902. In Glebe he owned many houses including the now heritage-listed seven adjoining residences in Glebe Point Road which encompass the houses called Favo and Gaza. In 1870 he founded the Industrial Permanent Building Society and remained as its Manager for the rest of his life. William was also an alderman for Glebe for three years and gave evidence to the Government's Select Committee on Immigration in 1880.

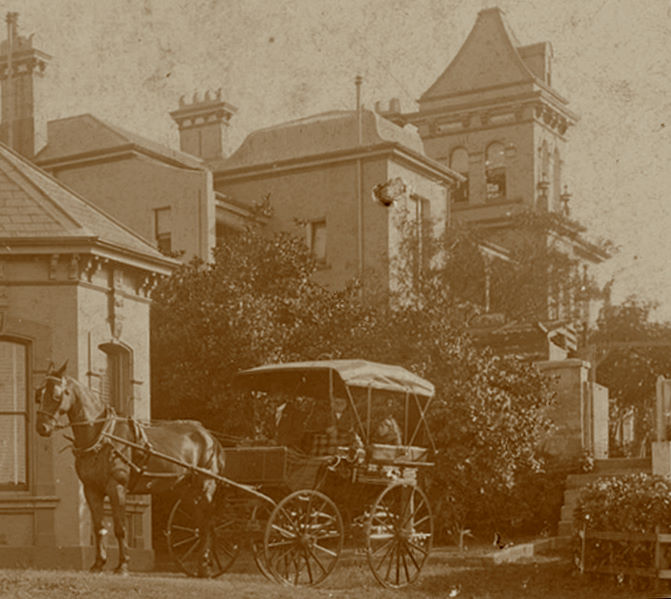
Close view of Venetia, 1899

In 1873 he bought two lots on Blackwattle Bay foreshore and two years later built a very large house which he called Venetia. Venetia was known to be full of art pieces, many collected on the Jarrett's overseas travels. A very strict father, his children and their spouses continued to live at Venetia, even after their marriages. By 1880 a row of seven houses had been built in then Kennedy Street (renamed in 1909 as an extension of Leichhardt Street). Jarrett also built a row of four houses further west in Oxley Street. Venetia was described in 1902 in an advertisement in the following terms:

“Venetia is a handsome and commodious two-story brick residence, slate roof containing wide entrance hall, 4 reception rooms and 7 bedrooms. Out offices, verandah and balconies, brick coach house, stable, man’s room, bathing house, terraced lawns, and garden extending to the sea-wall".

Jarrett's wife Margaret died in 1891 at their country residence called Fairlight in Mulgoa which is now also a heritage-listed property. In 1892 Jarrett remarried. His new wife was Lucy A. White. In about 1896 Jarrett commissioned Ambrose Thornley, an architect to build Bellevue on the adjoining lot fronting the Bay (see photo on right). The house was described in an advertisement in the following terms:

“Bellevue is an elegant Villa on the Point. Brick, slate roof. Containing hall, 3 reception rooms, 4 bedrooms and out offices, verandahs, garden and lawns".

In 1890 a residence, The Poplars, was built opposite Venetia. Jarrett built a second house Bellevue, adjoining Venetia in 1896. It was designed by Ambrose Thornley Junior, an architect who lived nearby in Florence Villa, and is typical of Thornley's designs, which included the Glebe Town Hall. Thornley was declared bankrupt in the 1890s and became a publican.

Jarrett rented this property from the time it was built. One of the first tenants was James George Warden who took the photograph of Bellevue shown above in 1899. Jarrett died in 1901 and his second wife, Lucy, lived at Venetia until 1903 and then moved to another house in Glebe.

==== James George Warden ====
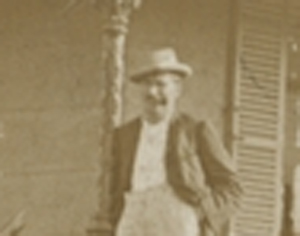
James George Warden, 1899.

James George Warden rented Bellevue from 1898 until 1903. Warden was born in London in about 1860. He immigrated to Sydney in 1878 on board the ship Christiana Thompson. In 1886, he established the firm of Warden Hotel Brokers in Pitt Street and in the following year he married Mary Jane O’Dwyer. The couple had five sons and one daughter over the next 12 years. Their youngest child, William was born in Glebe in 1899.

Warden was a foundation member of the Royal Motor Yacht Club. He also owned the property Pine Park in Forbes. Warden's wife died in 1903 and he remarried in 1924 to Edith H. Palmer, and the couple lived in Bellevue Hill. Warden died in 1937 at the age of 76.

==== Ownership, 1910s to 1950s ====
Following Jarrett's death, in July 1913 Bellevue and Venetia were sold to solicitor William Archibold Windeyer. Extensive reclamation and sea walls had extended Jarrett's original lots.

The 1905 Sands Directory shows Joseph Stinson (who owned the largest real estate agency in Glebe at the time) occupying Venetia and Thomas Riley occupying Bellevue. This was still the case in 1914, however from 1915 there are no further listings of Venetia, suggesting it was demolished by Windeyer in 1914/5, soon after his purchase.

Bellevue was occupied by Mrs Lena Reilly in 1920, and from 1924 until 1925 by George Cavanagh. After about 1925 the area around the Point at Blackwattle Bay became increasingly industrial and Bellevue became part of a timber yard for many years. By 1970 the whole foreshore was very unappealing and dirty. The newspaper The Glebe described it as “"a disaster area - deserted timber yards, empty fuel drums littered about, derelict houses and rusting hulks of barges moored to rotting jetties". 53 Leichhardt Street for a short time became a lighterage for McEnnally Bros. & Co. Ltd. While the sites of Venetia and The Poplars, together with Bellevue were incorporated into the Vanderfield & Reid Ltd. Timber Yards. 49–53 Leichhardt Street became Sylvester Stride's ship breaking yards. The crane which remains on the foreshore today (2004) to the rear of numbers 49 & 51B was part of Stride's operation. Although Stride demolished parts of the houses on his site, they remained relatively intact during his ownership, number 49 becoming part of the offices for the salvage and wrecking business.

Windeyer sold his land on the Point to Property Purchase P/L in 1939. Vanderfield & Reid Limited bought the property in 1948. The c. 1950 survey by the City of Sydney shows the extent of their timber yard holdings, north and south of Leichhardt Street. They also extended their holdings into the bay, as large numbers of logs were floated ready for processing. A c. 1970 photo shows a building (now demolished) had been attached to the rear of Bellevue (its south).

==== Ownership, 1970s to 1980s ====
In 1970, the extensive Vanderfield & Reid holdings were sold to Korvette Hardware, with mortgage finance provided by Parkes Developments and CAGA Finance. Parkes became known as the developer of the sites. At that time, the foreshore land was zoned industrial, and described in The Glebe as "a disaster area - deserted timber yards, empty fuel drums littered about, derelict houses and rusting hulks of barges moored to rotting jetties". Only the Maritime Services Board opposed the rezoning of the land to residential.

As a condition of the rezoning of the land as residential, and the approval process for a large apartment development on the site, the developer agreed to set aside land on the foreshore for a park. That outcome was assisted by community activists and members of the Glebe Society who, in particular, opposed the demolition of Bellevue.

Another condition of development approval was the restoration of Bellevue for community use, but Parkes commenced demolition. Insisting that it was an unfortunate misunderstanding, the company halted the demolition but subsequently failed to restore Bellevue's fabric, and also dumped fill excavated during the apartment construction on to the Bellevue site.

==== Local government ownership ====
Leichhardt Council subsequently purchased the foreshore parkland, including Bellevue, at the end of 1981. A section 130 Order was placed over Bellevue on 16 May 1980 to provide time to investigate the retention and re-use of the building.

Blackwattle Bay Park to the south of Bellevue was designed by Stuart Pittendrigh & Associates, who also designed the Reserves at Simmons Point and Peacock Point in Balmain. It was opened in August 1983. Part of the park was created to the west of the Strides site and in 1985 the Strides site was purchased by the then Department of Environment & Planning, for open space to link the two parts of Blackwattle Bay Park. However, after the original residences on the site were assessed as having heritage significance, the foreshore was subdivided and retained as a link, while the houses at 49, 51/51A, 51B and 53 had their squatters evicted and were sold with caveats which ensure their restoration and retention. The 5 houses were sold for $800,000.

The foreshore land was transferred to Leichhardt Council in 1987. Council had limited funds to restore Bellevue.

After LEP listing as an item of state significance in 1984 it was re-roofed with slate, assisted by a $17,000 $ for $ grant from the Heritage Conservation fund administered by the Heritage Council. As one of the conditions attached to the assistance the owner applied for the making of a Permanent Conservation Order over the item. To ensure the long term protection of the item the Heritage Council at its meeting of 6 February 1986 recommended to the Minister that a Permanent Conservation Order be placed over Bellevue. The Permanent Conservation Order was gazetted on 25 July 1986.

In 1984 the Glebe Society surveyed local residents and community organisations on possible uses for Bellevue. Council prepared sketch plans, allocating the upper storey for public use and a scheme of funding was presented to Council. This plan did not proceed. In 1988 the Australian Society of Authors expressed interest in establishing its headquarters in Bellevue, with a low level of use and some public access. Changes in Council caused this proposal to lapse.

In 1991 Leichhardt Council called for tenders for the lease, restoration and commercial use of Bellevue, and made a new wharf a condition of its development. Successful tenderer Anthony Vick & Associates was to restore Bellevue and establish a restaurant with water access from a new wharf. The approval also allowed for a kiosk, caretaker's flat and 20 parking spaces. By 1993 the approval had lapsed. After extensive public consultation, the Glebe Society favoured using Bellevue for a 'kiosk, public toilets, park equipment storage and a local environment museum.'

In 1996 Anthony Vick lodged a new application for a large residence, coffee shop/kiosk, gazebo and toilets, which was refused.

In the late 1990s Council also refused an application to use Bellevue as a restaurant with part of the park area providing 22 parking spaces. In 1998 further community consultation occurred when EDAW P/L prepared a Management Plan for Blackwattle Bay Park and Bellevue. Despite the many proposals and community consultations, Bellevue remains derelict and fenced to prevent public access.

In 1994 the Heritage Council approved work for the conversion of the building into a restaurant and caretakers flat and construction of a kiosk, store and toilets within the courtyard of the property. (this did not proceed). In 2003, the suburb of Glebe and Bellevue came under the jurisdiction of the City of Sydney Council. In 2005, the City of Sydney commissioned a Conservation Management Plan for Bellevue and a development application was approved for its restoration and refurbishment as part of Glebe foreshore parks upgrading. On 3 March 2007 an open day was held at Bellevue to celebrate the completion of the building's restoration. The house remains in the ownership of the City of Sydney.

=== Popular culture ===
In 1979, the band, Australian Crawl, filmed their video for "Beautiful People" at the then dilapidated and graffitied Bellevue.

== Description ==
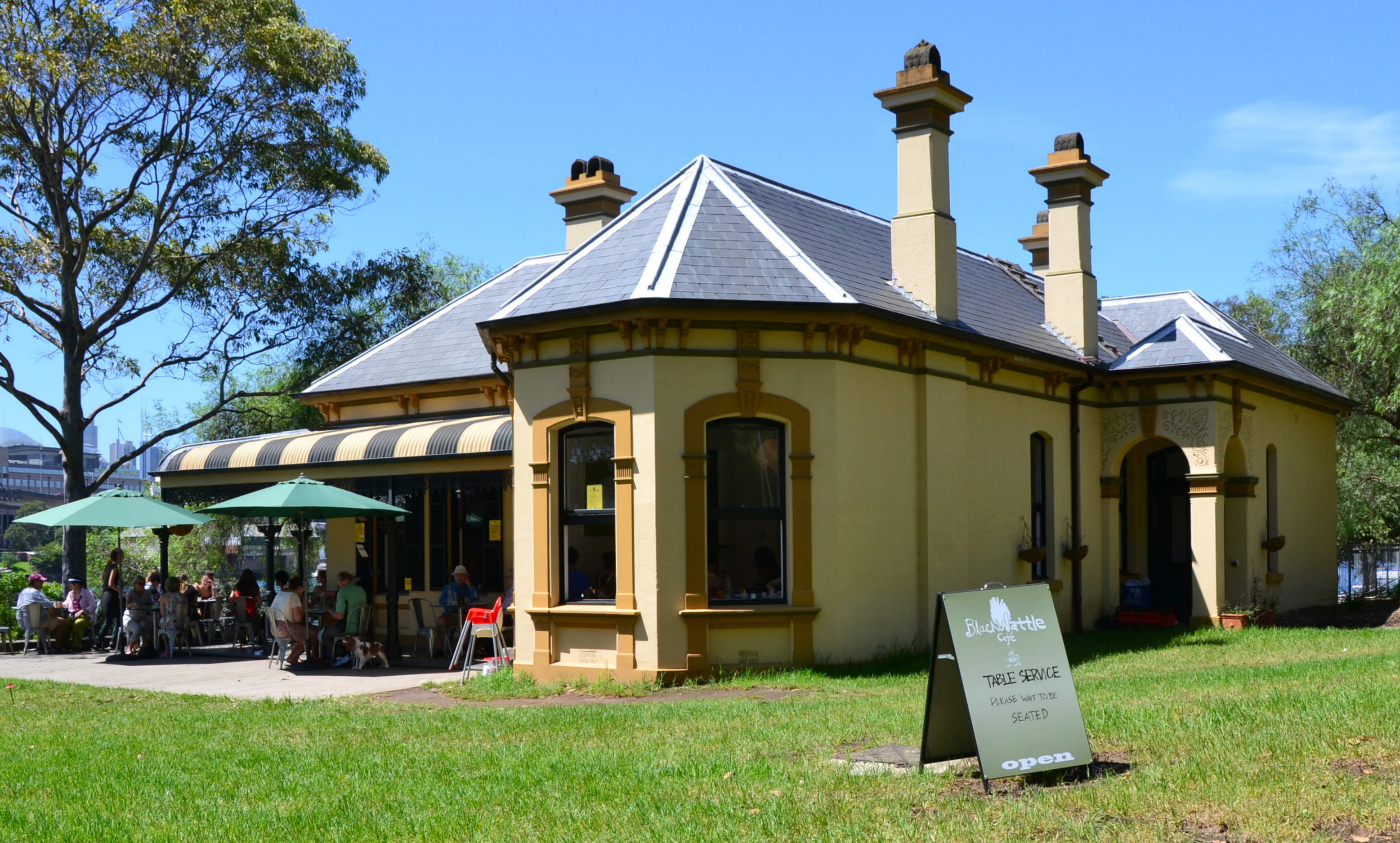
Bellevue converted to use as a cafe, 2012.

Bellevue is of restrained Italianate design and is of stuccoed brick construction. Part two storey stucco, new fibre cement shingle roof- plaster eaves brackets bullnose verandah. Multi-bedroom single storey building with large entertaining areas and numerous basement rooms.

In 2003 Bellevue came under the jurisdiction of the City of Sydney Council because the suburb of Glebe had been transferred to their control. In 2005, the Council commissioned a Conservation Management Plan for Bellevue, and a development application was approved for its restoration and refurbishment as part of Glebe foreshore parks upgrading. On 3 March 2007 an open day was held at Bellevue to celebrate the completion of the building's restoration. The house remains in the ownership of the City of Sydney Council. It was converted to commercial use and was being used as a cafe by 2012. This cafe closed in mid 2016. In 2018, the SMH Good Food Guide noted a new cafe/restaurant operator Anthony Moskovitz was intending to 'rebirth' the Blackwattle cafe site as 'Antoine at the Cottage', to open March 2018 under the restrictions of the last tenant. As of September 2018, this cafe had still not opened.

=== Condition ===
As at 5 May 2004, despite the many proposals and community consultations, Bellevue remains derelict and fenced to prevent public access. A preliminary assessment of the archaeological potential of Bellevue is that it is of local significance. Both Bellevue and the physical remains of the adjacent Venetia are representative of houses constructed in the last quarter of the nineteenth century, which are common in the area.

The site of Venetia is considered to have a high degree of archaeological potential.

=== Modifications and dates ===
- 1875+ – residential use of the site: Venetia constructed, with several outbuildings fronting Leichhardt Street and along the (eastern) boundary with Bellevue, boatshed, formal gardens with carriage drive in front, wall to east end of wharf
- 1896 – Bellevue constructed
- c. 1915 – Venetia demolished, and a large shed was built over the site of the house. At least one outbuilding continued in use under the timber milling operation.
- 1925 – timber milling operation commenced on site. Vanderfield & Reid Timber milling company operations extended across both sites, and to Blackwattle Bay on the south side of Leichhardt Street. Accretions were added to Bellevue, e.g.: shed in courtyard to rear, and attached to the building.
- c. 1970 – timber framed and iron-roofed buildings across much of the site (aerial photograph) and much site clearing, on foreshore areas and around sheds, and dumping of fill on the slope and in front of Bellevue. Particular site disturbance appears to have occurred in the west corner where a crane was located, corresponding with the site of a former boatshed.
- 1970+ – Blackwattle Bay Park was created by further filling and landscaping over the site. All structures except Bellevue were removed, substantial amounts of fill added from nearby development sites, and landscaping with tree plantings and lawn.

== Heritage listing ==
As at 5 May 2004, Bellevue was constructed c. 1896 and designed by local architect Ambrose Thornley and is a compromised example of a modest late Victorian dwelling with some characteristics of the Italianate style. It is one of the few surviving examples of mid-late Victorian dwellings that characterised Jarrett's Point on the Blackwattle Bay foreshore. The dwelling's form and general aesthetic character is representative of its architectural style, the late 19th century period of construction and the phase of residential development in the local area at the time. However the comprehensive loss of detailing, joinery and ornamentation in association with its dilapidated state has eroded the representative formal aesthetic values of the place.

Bellevue is significant to the local area for its landmark aesthetic values associated with its prominent siting on Jarrett's Point in the open space setting of Blackwattle Bay Park. The dwelling is highly visible from a number of significant vantage points in the area and is a significant and characteristic feature of the Glebe foreshore area. Bellevue was also the focus of the local community during the mid-1970s when it was saved from demolition by developers through the actions of ardent local residents

Bellevue has aesthetic and social significance as an important townscape element on point between Rozelle Bay and Blackwattle Bay. It has architectural significance as one of the most visually prominent cottages at Glebe Point.

Bellevue was listed on the New South Wales State Heritage Register on 2 April 1999.

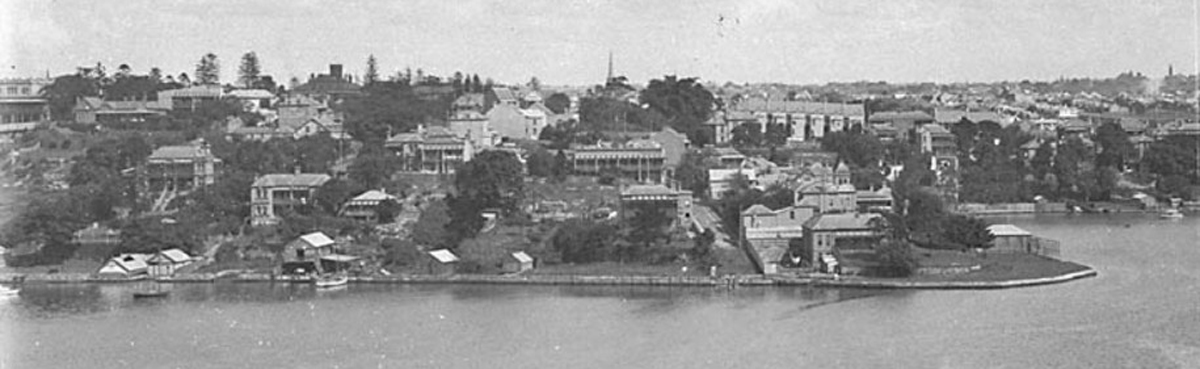
Blackwattle Bay foreshore circa 1900. Bellevue can be seen at far right.

== See also ==
- Australian residential architectural styles
