= Resch's Limited =

Former Australian brewing company

Coordinates: 33.8967432°S 151.2152146°E

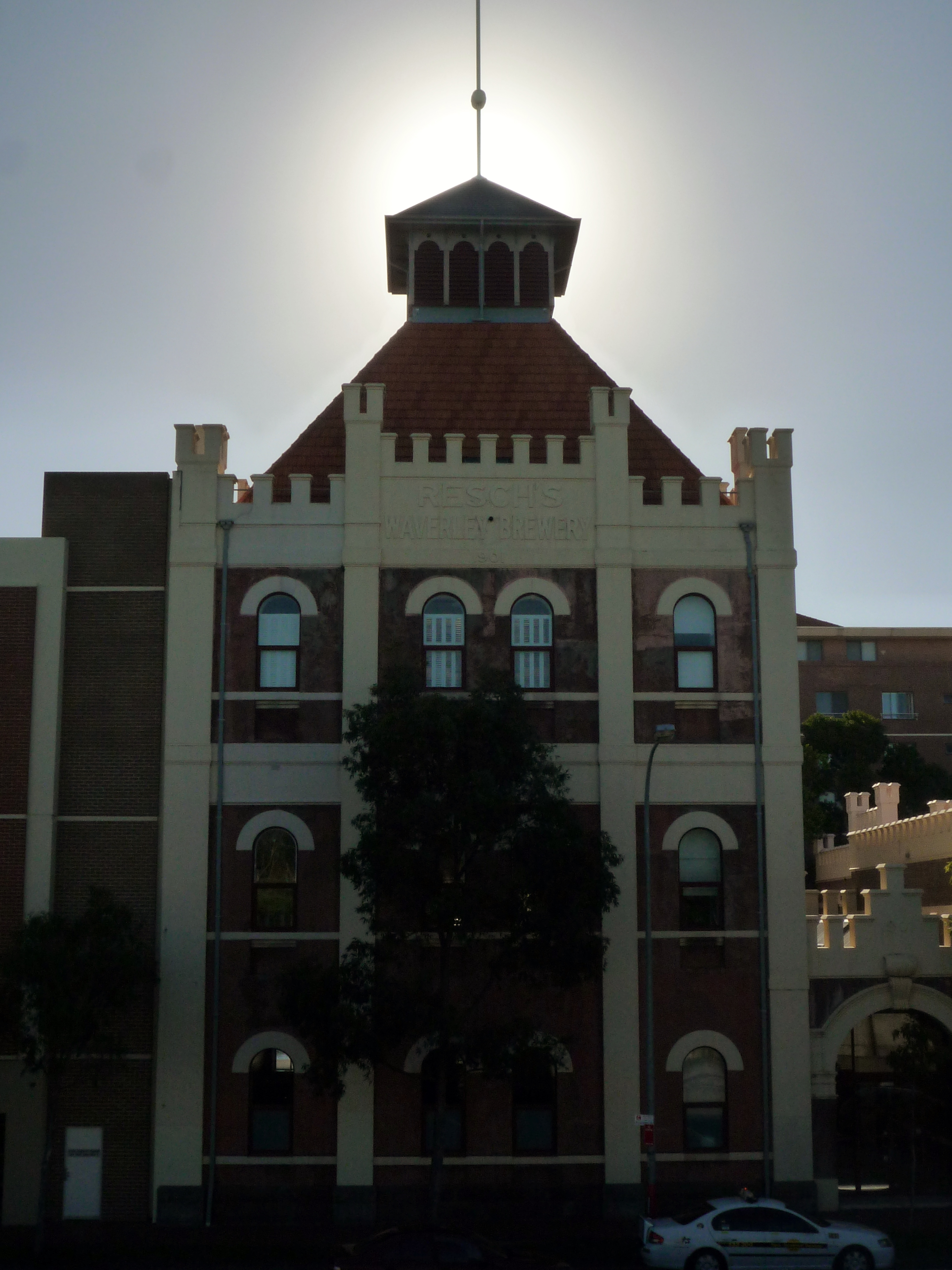
The former Resch's Limited brewery, now converted to apartments

Resch's Limited was an Australian brewing company. It was incorporated in July 1906 to manage the brewing interests of German immigrant Edmund Resch, who had owned regional breweries before buying out Sydney brewer Allt's and then building his own brewery. It operated the "Waverley Brewery" in the Sydney suburb of Waterloo. Resch operated the company until his death in 1923, after which time it was operated by his sons. In July 1929, Tooth and Co. purchased the company's assets for approximately £2,500,000 and it was placed into voluntary liquidation. Their brand continues in 2018 as Resch's, now owned by Carlton and United Breweries.

As with other Australian breweries, it also owned a series of hotels, with the Royal George Hotel in the Sydney central business district and the Australian Hotel and Orient Hotel in The Rocks among the notable hotels formerly owned by the company.
