= Elizabeth Macarthur Bay =

Recreational bay in Pyrmont, New South Wales, Australia

Coordinates: 33°51′55″S 151°11′27″E

Elizabeth Macarthur Bay is a small bay off Johnstons Bay, Pyrmont, in Sydney, now developed into a decorative and recreational bay at Pirrama Park.

The Bay is named for Elizabeth Macarthur, wife of the wool pioneer John Macarthur, who had purchased nearby land in Pyrmont in 1797.

The Elizabeth MacArthur Bay Public Pontoon in Pirrama Park was reopened as a stop on the F10 Blackwattle Bay ferry service in early 2025.

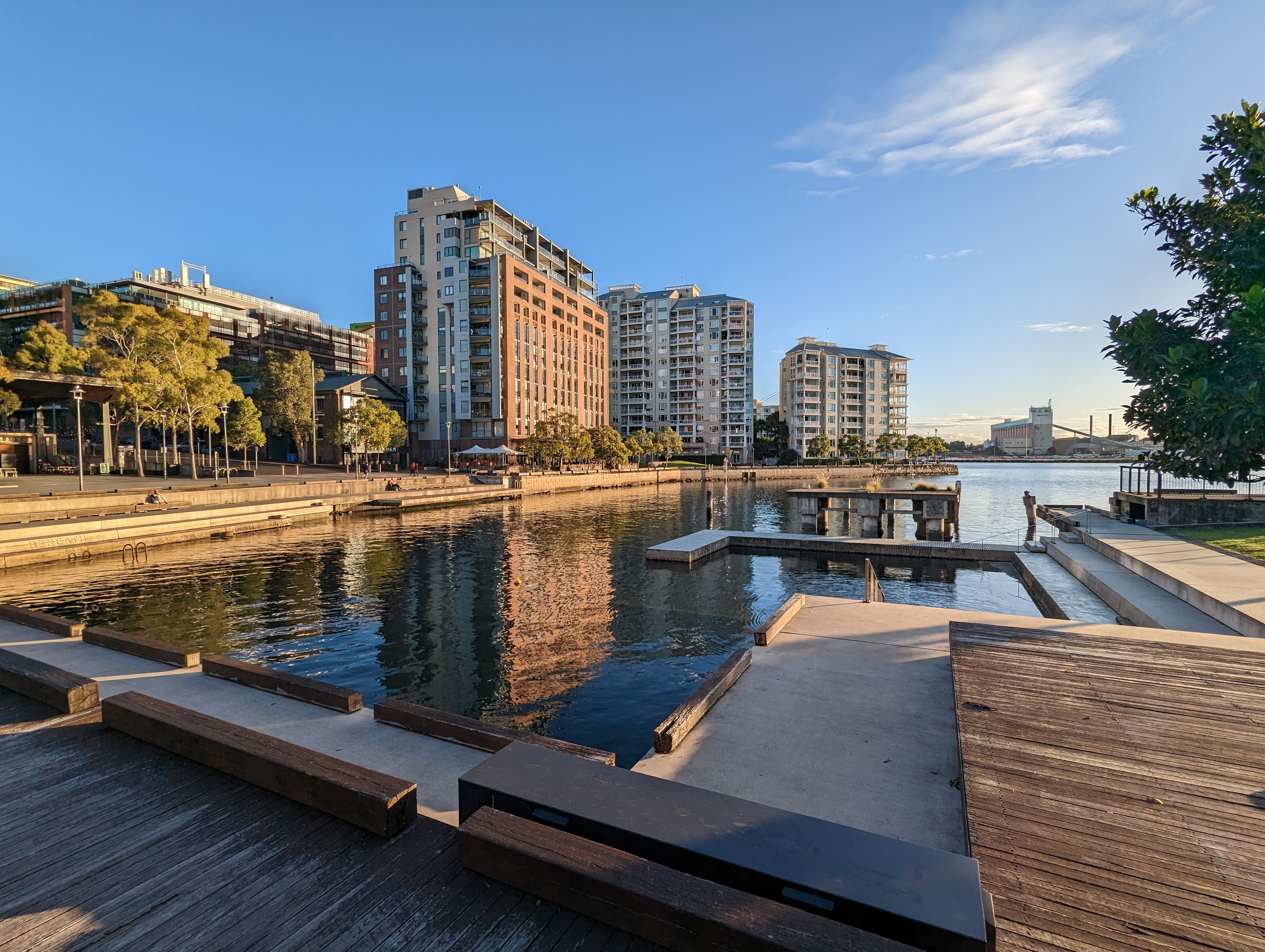
View of Elizabeth Macarthur Bay from Pirrama Park
