= Tooth and Co. =

Australian brewer and beer brand

Tooth & Co
- Type: Public
- Traded as: ASX: TTH
- Industry: Brewing
- Founded: 1835
- Founder: John Tooth; Charles Newnham
- Headquarters: Sydney, Australia
- Products: Beer

Tooth and Co was a major brewer of beer in New South Wales, Australia. It was one of Australia's oldest companies, having been established as a partnership in 1835. It was formerly listed on the Australian Securities Exchange.

== History ==
Tooth's era label of KB Lager, one of its most popular beers

Invicta, the flag of the English county of Kent

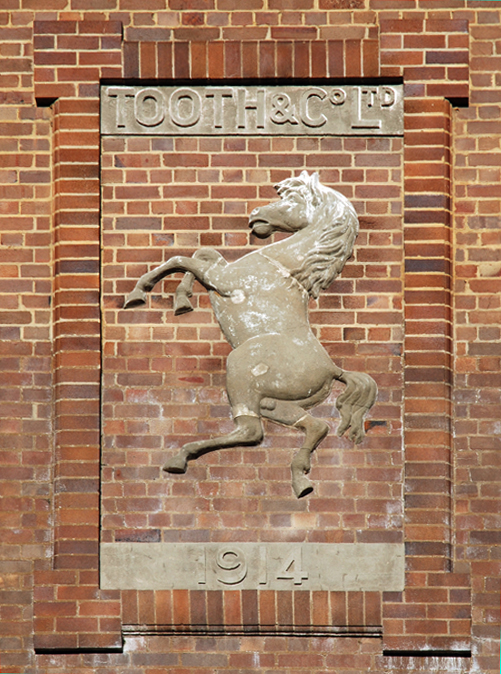
Trademark of Tooth & Co., embedded in the wall of one of the buildings at the abandoned Mittagong Maltings

=== Family business ===
John Tooth emigrated to Australia in the early 1830s, traded for a time as a general merchant, and then in 1835, with his brother-in-law, Charles Newnham, opened the Kent Brewery in Sydney. It was incorporated as a company in 1888.

The Tooth family had interests in banking, agriculture and real estate and could afford to support their brewing operations through the turbulent times of the late 19th century, enabling the brewer to become the dominant maker of beer into the 20th century. Tooth's major asset was Kent Brewery, although Tooth had numerous other assets; it owned Blue Bow Cordials (which later produced Blue Bow Lemonade), it acquired the Maltings at Mittagong in 1905, Maltings at Carlton Street, Sydney, Resch's Limited and its Waverley Brewery in 1929, numerous hotels and considerable land. Tooth owned the New South Wales franchise of Hungry Jack's, although it failed to exploit the franchise. It also owned the d'Albora Marina. For a short period from 1978 it also owned the Courage Brewery in Victoria, and a brewery at Tuncester, near Lismore. For a period it owned Penfolds and the Koala Motel Chain. The Tooth family is also famous for building the Swifts mansion at Darling Point in Sydney.

=== Breweries and other buildings ===
Kent Brewery was built on Blackwattle Bay in 1835. The original Tooth and Co produced many beers, of which only two remain on the market – KB Lager and Kent Old Brown. Kent brewery was substantially damaged by a fire in about 1900. In 1913 Tooth and Co acquired the Maitland Brewing Company.

In 1911, architects Spain, Cosh & Minett designed a brewery administration building for Tooth and Co. at 10B Ultimo in Federation Free Style, a building considered "a prestigious and elaborate example of the firm's brewery work".

In 1921, Tooth and Co took over Resch's and their "Waverley" brewery on South Dowling Street in Redfern. Acquisition was conditional that Tooth would not change the original recipe for Resch's Beer. In 1921 Tooth also acquired a Newcastle brewery, the Castlemaine Brewery and Wood Brothers Company. (Note: The Castlemaine Brewery and Wood Brothers Company was unrelated to the brewery company that became Castlemaine Perkins or the Castlemaine Brewery, Western Australia.) Tooth later made an unsuccessful attempt to acquire the Millers Brewery (owned by coal and shipping magnate RW Miller), located at Taverner's Hill in Sydney. In 1967, Millers Brewery was sold to rivals, Tooheys.

Tooth was losing business to the takeaway packaged beer market, and established Bottle-Mart, whose original spokesman was the comedian Spike Milligan. In 1978, Tooth constructed a brewery at Lismore.

=== Expansion into Victoria ===
Tooth relied primarily on the pub industry; however, clubs were becoming increasingly important as a liquor outlet. The clubs were supplied by Courage Brewery in Victoria, which meant that Tooth was losing ground. In 1978, Tooth acquired the Courage Brewery in Victoria, signifying a major move into the Victorian market.

== Logo ==
The logo and trademark of Tooth and Co was based on the battle standard of two Saxon chiefs, Hengist (stallion) and Horsa (horse) who invaded Britain more than 1,400 years ago, landing at Ebbsfleet in 449 AD. On the crowning of Hengist's son, Eric, as the first King of Kent, their standard, a white horse known as Invicta, became the emblem of Kent. It was adopted in more modern times as the ensign of Kentish Units in the British Army. Kent has always been the principal hop growing area of the UK, and John Tooth was born in Kent. He made the white horse rampant his company's trademark. In the early 1970s, in an apparent attempt to modernise the image of the company, the symbol was secretly gelded. The more observant staff of the company noticed the change, and saw it as a portent of things to come. Subsequently, the trademark was changed, with some fanfare, to a stylised horse head, as shown on the label shown above. A more recent annual report (1995) showed both the gelding and a knight, located on the corner of a chess board.

== Staff facilities and benefits ==
Tooth offered numerous staff benefits. The company offered a £10 marriage bonus to those employees getting married while in the company's service. Leave was four weeks per year, with 50% loading. Although there was no formal superannuation available, employees retiring from the company "would be provided for" on confidential terms. There was a staff social club coordinated by Kent Brewery. Following restructuring circa 1975, Tooth had a gymnasium (at Kent Brewery), "Wet" canteen (Kent and Waverley breweries) and a (non-technical) reading room/library. The social club also purchased an old fishing boat, sponsored by the company. The social club published a magazine called Tooth Topics.

Employees had a generous ration of beer at morning tea (called the beer break), lunch, afternoon tea and when they clocked off. Some of the trade supervisors were able to float between bars during the day. The brewery had several bars, in addition to which plant operators could tap a leaking cask for their own enjoyment; such a cask was called the honeypot. Tooth unsuccessfully sought a ruling from the Industrial Relations Commission that the honeypot would be banned. The ruling was that a precedent had been set. Subsequently, an inebriated operator, while travelling home, was hit by a train. Tooth successfully appealed the IRC decision. The honeypot was banned and instead Tooth would issue plastic tokens allowing employees to take home one carton of beer per week for their private enjoyment. That arrangement ended with Carlton & United Breweries.

In an apparent contradiction, Tooth would not tolerate drunkenness among its staff. Depending on perceived value to the company, alcoholism could lead either to summary dismissal, or to a drying out period at a clinic.

== Decline ==
Prior to 1974, Tooth relied on a handshake agreement with its interstate rivals that they would not intrude in each other's territories, while Tooth's hotels were tied, meaning licensees were bound to market Tooth beers.

Both of these practices would be outlawed under the Trade Practices Act in 1974. Tooth appointed McKinsey & Company to review its procedures, which was headed by Fred Hilmer, a strong advocate of free competition.

Following the review, Tooth made a number of structural changes; McKinsey generally followed the Harvard Business School of thought that the company should use external consultants for its non-core activities. Between 1975 and 1980, Tooth made numerous acquisitions, two of which were catering firm Wright-Heaton and Budge Refrigeration.

In 1975, Tooth reconstructed the brewing facilities at Irving Street, Sydney, which was funded from cash flow. Between 1976 and 1982, Tooth and Co owned Penfolds winery. As indication of the conservative financial status of Tooth, the acquisition was funded by tightening credit terms with the hoteliers from 90 days down to 30 days. Penfolds was later acquired by Southcorp Wines.

Tooth saw the weakness in its financial position, and took some action to avert being a takeover target. It attempted a reverse takeover of LJ Hooker, so as to acquire Hooker's expertise in managing the land holdings; the takeover failed.

In 1981, a controlling interest in Tooth and Co was acquired by David Jones, then a division of the Adelaide Steamship Company, a corporate raider and asset stripper. In 1983 Adelaide Steamship Company sold the brewing interests to Carlton & United Breweries. Subsequently, Victoria Bitter, Fosters, Cascade Light and Stirling Light were then brewed at Kent Brewery. Adelaide Steamship Company's acquisitions were funded by huge borrowings, and the group had high debt levels (gearing). With the onset of the recession of the early 1990s, interest rates rose.

Under the pressure of its debt, Adelaide Steamship Company was forced to liquidate all tangible assets, although its bankers had agreed to an orderly sale. The disposal started in 1991, and concluded on 24 December 1999 when Adelaide Steamship Company, under its new name of Residual Assco Group Limited, was delisted.

With the disposal of assets, various member companies of Adelaide Steamship Company were renamed. David Jones was renamed DJL Ltd prior to the relisting of the department stores as David Jones in 1995. The Adelaide Steamship Company was renamed Residual Assco prior to the listing of AdSteam Marine in 1997. The owners of Dextran, and hence IEL, were now called Residual Assco, DJL and Tooth, and still share the tax liability. Pending the outcome of the taxation ruling, the three companies remain in limbo. The matter continued to grind on in the courts, as in December 2007 IEL were given leave to appeal the Australian Taxation Office ruling, with the matters being completed by 2010.

Tooth, as a listed company, had to publish an annual report. Each year the three companies (Residual Assco, DJL, and Tooth) went through the formality of an Annual General Meeting. The meeting in regard to the three worthless companies takes about twenty minutes; on the basis of a comparison with three witches huddled over a cauldron, analysts and the press named the three companies the three ugly sisters. Tooth and Co was delisted from the Australian Securities Exchange in February 2010.

== Today ==
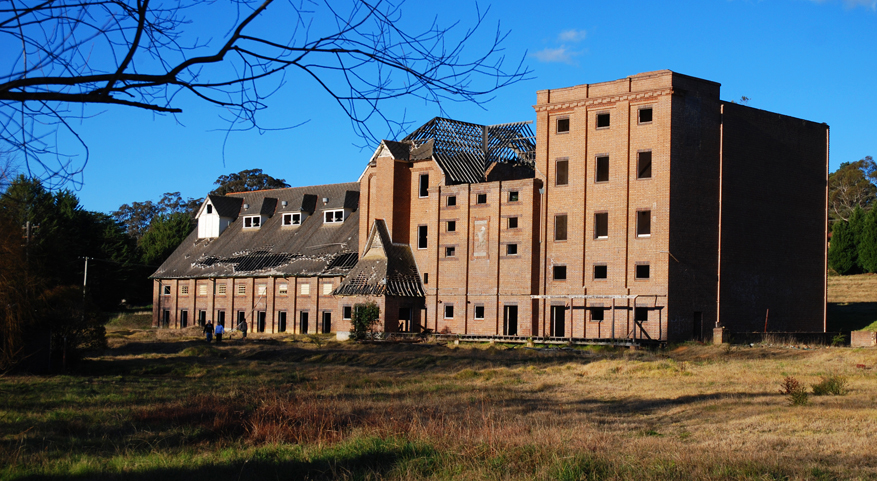
The abandoned Mittagong Maltings

=== Kent Brewery ===
In early 2005, CUB closed the massive Kent Brewery in Chippendale, with all CUB beers in NSW now sourced from Queensland and Victoria. The brewery site was demolished and is now high-rise units, a shopping mall, green space and offices known as the Central Park precinct. The core cluster of brewery yard buildings has undergone an award-winning refurbishment by Tzannes architects and a heritage chimney and a gate have been retained. The gate still bears the trademark of Invicta, the rampant stallion.

=== Hahn ===
Staff from the Kent and Waverley breweries founded several small boutique breweries. Chuck Hahn, who was production manager at Tooth, founded the Hahn Brewery on Pyrmont Bridge Road, Pyrmont. A syndicate of brewers founded the Pumphouse Brewery in Darling Harbour. The two fledgling breweries were physically close and shared technology. A third brewery was established at Old Sydney Town near Gosford. Hahn was subsequently acquired by Lion Nathan, and the Pumphouse brewery site has been redeveloped.

=== Maltings ===
The Maltings at Carlton Street, Sydney, and at Mittagong were managed by three brothers Ernest, Clarrie and Arthur Jones. Their father William was also the original manager of the Maltings from 1905 until his death in 1928. The Jones family had a combined service to Tooth and Co of well over 150 years. Mittagong Maltings had a considerable land holding, although much of the land was sold for a peppercorn to an adjacent girls school. Mittagong Maltings had three separate buildings, one destroyed by a fire in 1965. The other two are now abandoned, having closed in 1981. The Mittagong Maltings is in a state of disrepair and has been considerably vandalised. Waverley Brewery and the Blue Bow site have been redeveloped as housing.

The Lismore Brewery did commence production, and was intended to cover distribution of regions north of Tooheys' Grafton brewery. But as soon as production commenced, Tooheys acquired Castlemaine XXXX brewery, so the distribution potential for a brewery at Lismore became locked in. Tooheys and Castlemaine are now part of the Lion group.

=== Museum ===
Tooth established and maintained a comprehensive brewing museum at its Kent Brewery. The contents of the museum have since been donated to the Powerhouse Museum, located in Harris Street, Ultimo, where some are now on permanent display.

== Beers ==
Longneck of Reschs DA

- KB Lager – named after the Kent Brewery, once one of the most popular beers in NSW, was produced in small amounts by Carlton & United (CUB) was discontinued everywhere apart from Henson Park, NSW, the home ground of the Newtown Jets Rugby League Football Club until a few years ago when it ceased to be available there are as well. Following campaigning by the on-line group, The Reschs Appreciation Society, CUB resumed making it and it is still available despite it initially meant to be only a limited release.
- Kent Old Brown – a brown ale, different in style from the darker and sweeter Old Black Ale brewed by Tooheys. Kent Old Brown is only available on tap. It is most common on tap in Newcastle.
- Reschs Pilsner – originally brewed by Reschs brewery until it was taken over by Tooth and Co in 1929. It was once a very popular NSW beer, but has never been advertised by Carlton United. It has maintained a level of popularity and is still available in most bottle shops in NSW. Old advertisements depicting Rugby League players from the 1930s to the 1960s, with the tagline "Reschs Refreshes", are now considered collector's items. With the current fashion of being "retro" in Australia, Reschs Pilsner has managed to maintain a market share in the younger demographic, and is available throughout Sydney, and other major centres of NSW (e.g. Newcastle, Wollongong). While being brewed in Queensland by CUB, it is sold only in New South Wales. Critics claim that these 'retro' beers from CUB differ only by their labels, and are not true to the original recipes.
- Reschs Draught, the draught version of Reschs Pilsener is readily available on tap in New South Wales (outside the Riverina district).
- Reschs Dinner Ale (DA) – available again unofficially as of 6 April 2022 in cans only when some retailers jumped the gun and made their stocks available early. The re-release followed campaigning by the on-line group, The Reschs Appreciation Society. CUB officially launched it on 12 April 2022. Originally, DA was available in longneck cans and bottles, but there does not appear to be any plan by CUB to release it in bottles again. The brew was often called 'Dirty Annie'. Its supporters considered it to be the finest of Edmond Resch's creations. In 2012, a 1962 bottle of DA was discovered hidden inside a piano, but the owner has yet to open it.

== Pub paintings ==
A feature of Tooth and Co was the sponsorship of large pub paintings in the 1930s and 1940s in NSW. Walter Jardine (1884–1970), an internationally known commercial artist of the era, was contracted to do a series of ink and water colour posters for Tooths. These pub posters sought to advertise beer by associating it with sport, health and cultural sophistication. Tooth and Co owned hundreds of pubs throughout NSW at the time and sought to decorate many with these paintings. Many have now disappeared from the pub walls; they are now highly valued as souvenirs of the era.

== See also ==
- Australian pub
- Beer in Australia
- List of breweries in Australia
