= Blackwattle Bay =

Bay in Sydney Harbour

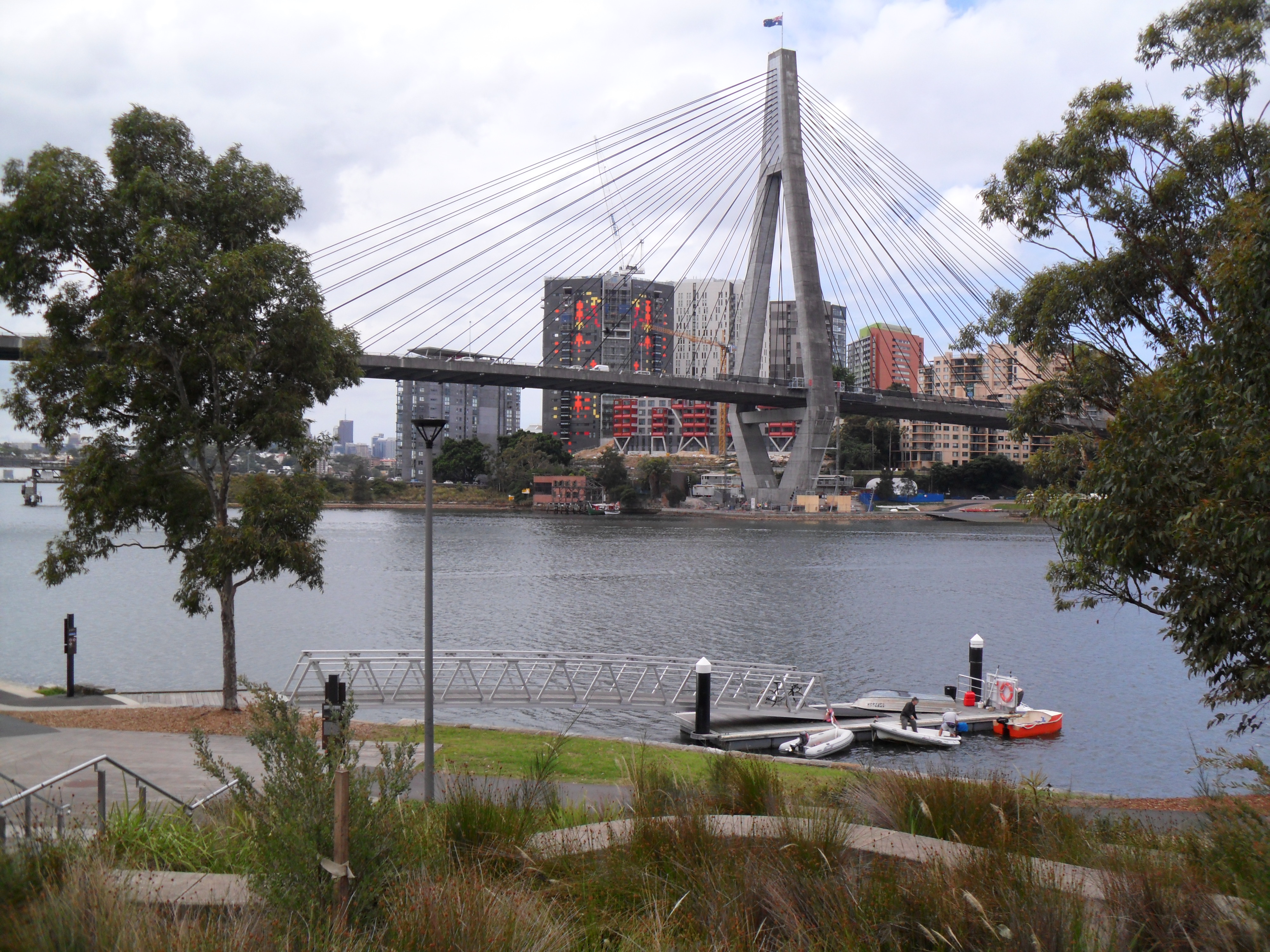
- Blackwattle Bay Pontoon, Glebe

- Location within New South Wales
- Location: Sydney Harbour
- Coordinates: 33°52′21″S 151°11′20″E
- Part of: Sydney Harbour
- Primary outflows: Johnstons Bay
- Basin countries: Australia
- Settlements: Glebe

Blackwattle Bay is a bay to the south-east of Glebe Island and east of Rozelle Bay on Sydney Harbour. In 1788 the bay was named after the black wattle tree found there that was used for housing construction.

When first used, the bay was a swampy inlet fed by a creek that ran from its eastern end. Industrial use by tanners and slaughter houses fouled the area with noxious fumes and there were many complaints by residents.

An embankment with a bridge was built across the swamp to provide access from Glebe to Pyrmont, being known as Bridge Road. The area to the southeast of the road was filled in becoming Wentworth Park. A coal unloader among other facilities was built on the northwest side of the road; the Sydney Fish Market lies on its northeast side.

== See also ==
- Blackwattle Bay ferry service
- Blackwattle Bay coal wharves and depots
- Wentworth Park

== Gallery ==
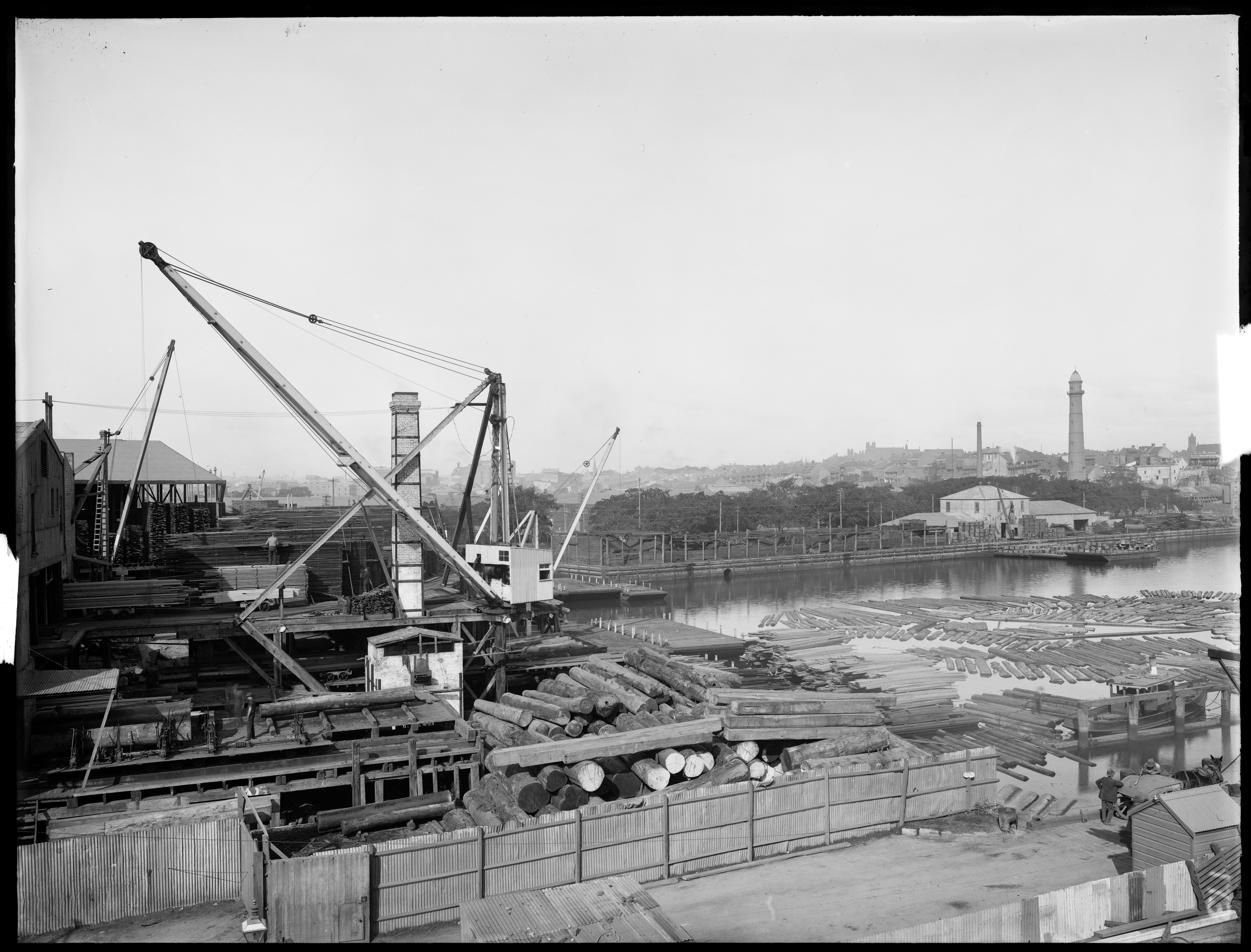
Hudson's Timber yard, Blackwattle Bay, Sydney, ca. 1920-1925

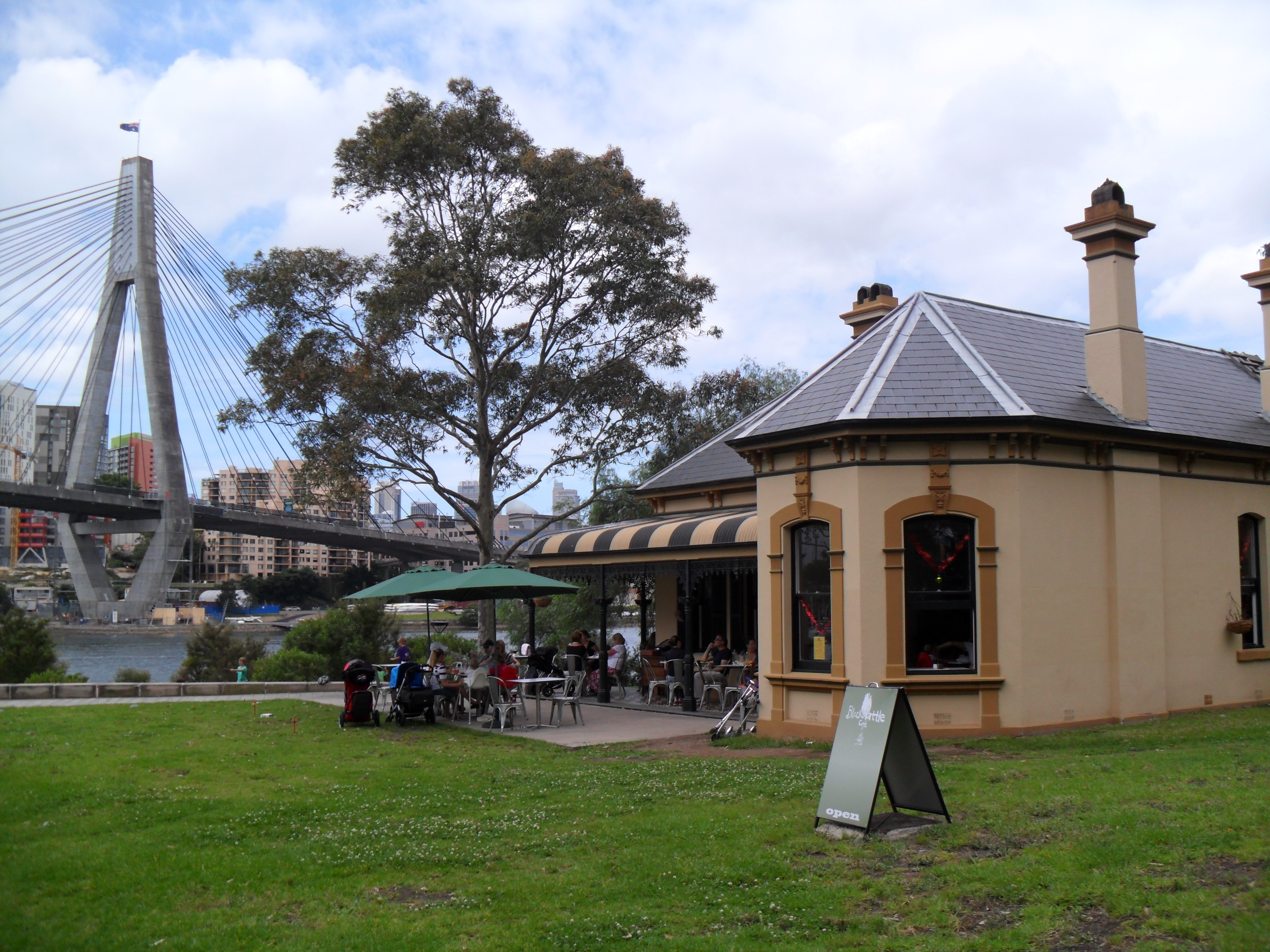
Bellevue House at waterside end of Leichhardt Street, Glebe, which includes a cafe and restaurant

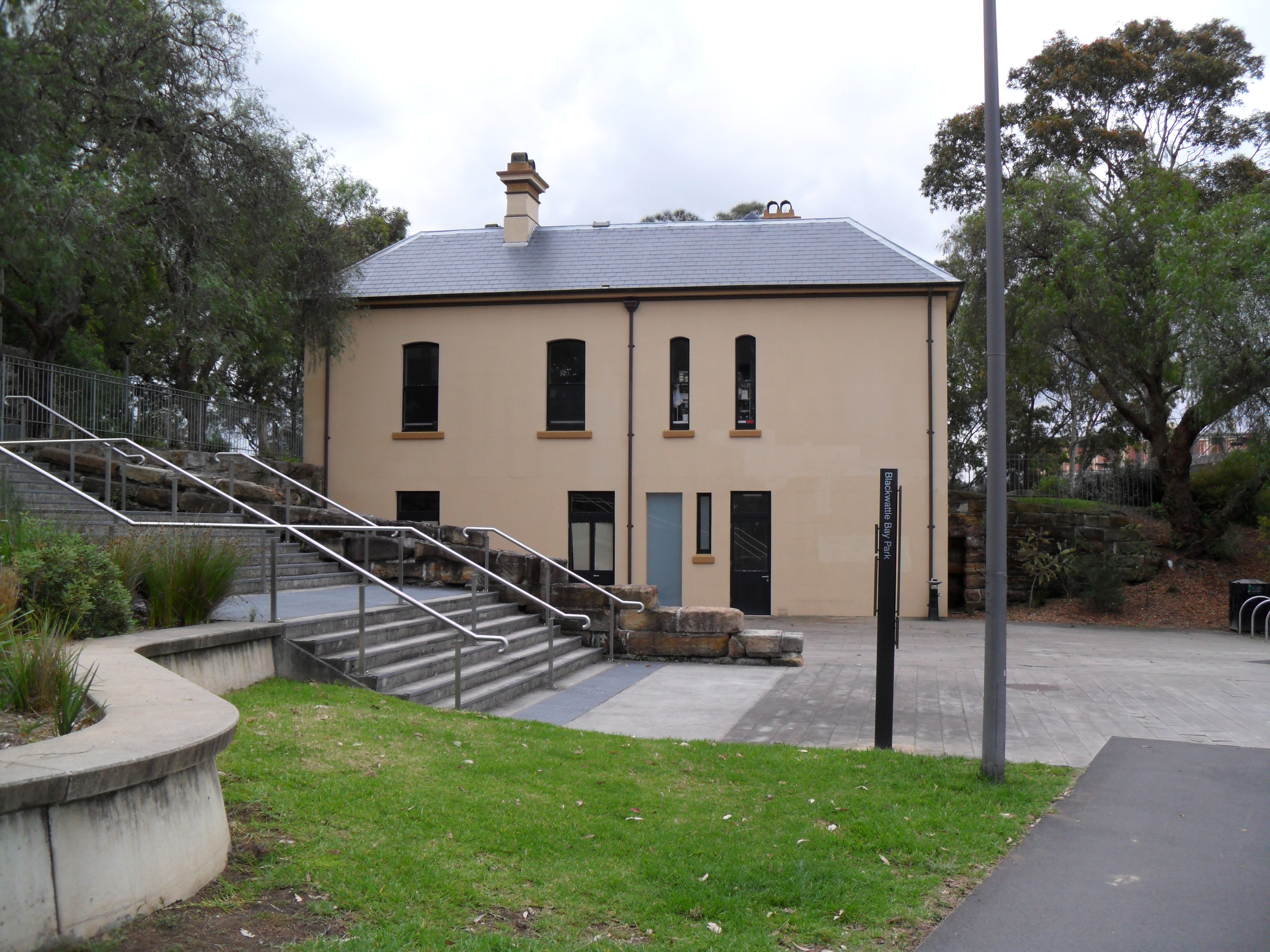
Bellevue House, Leichhardt Street Glebe at Blackwattle Bay Park

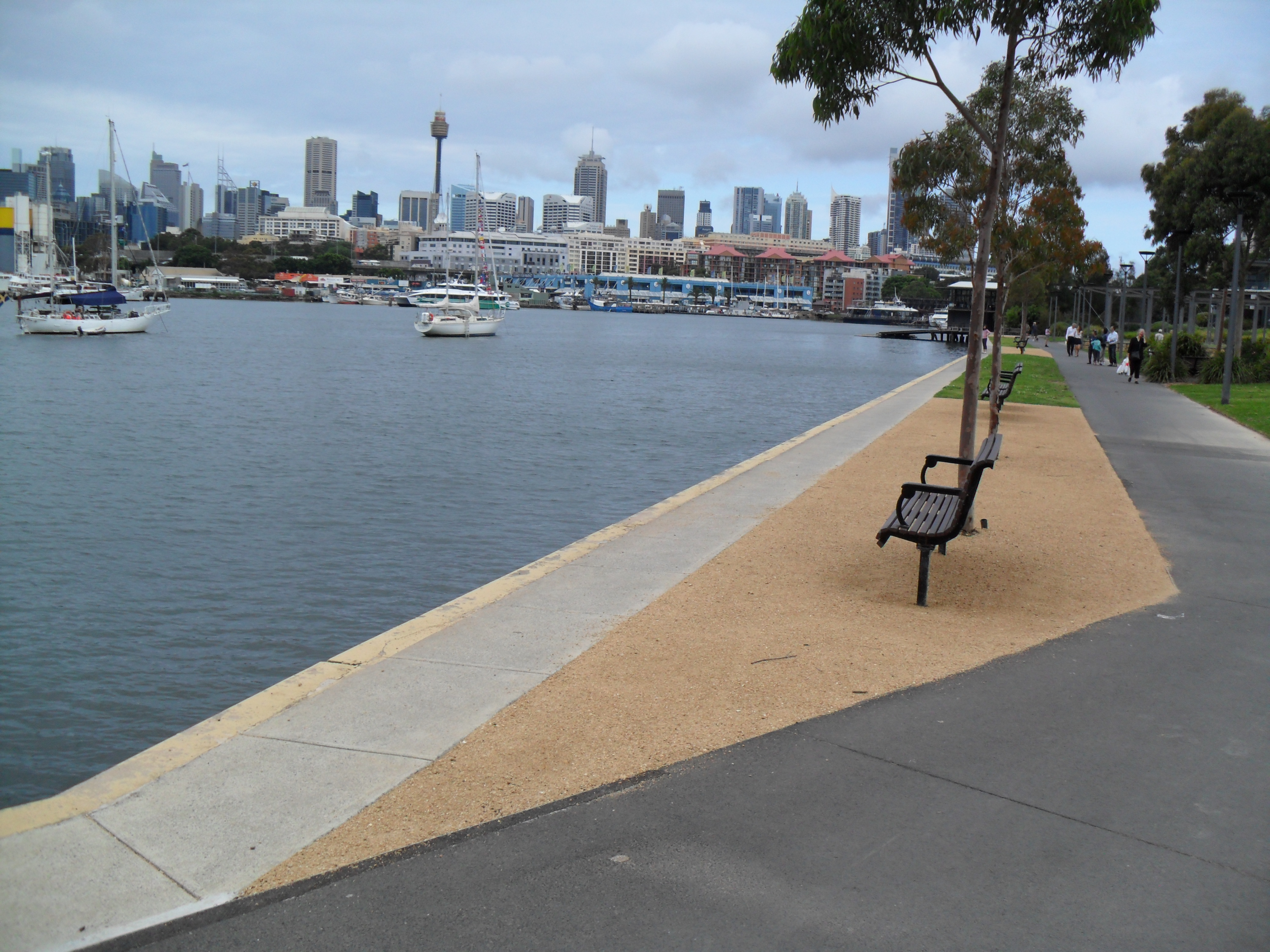
Blackwattle Bay view from end of Cook Street, Glebe Point, across to Sydney Fish Market and Sydney CBD

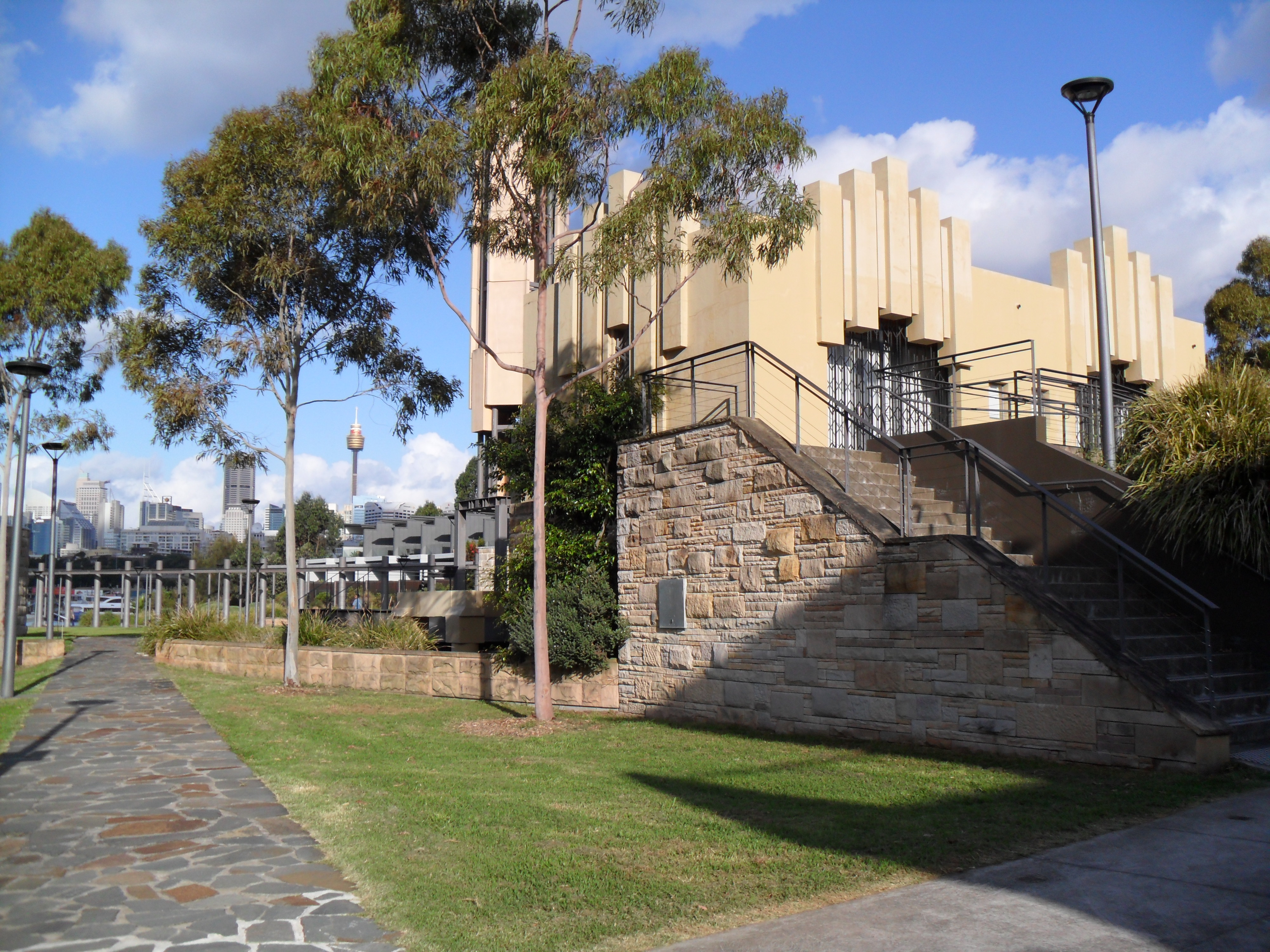
Walter Burley Griffin historic, now re-purposed, incinerator in Sheehy Street

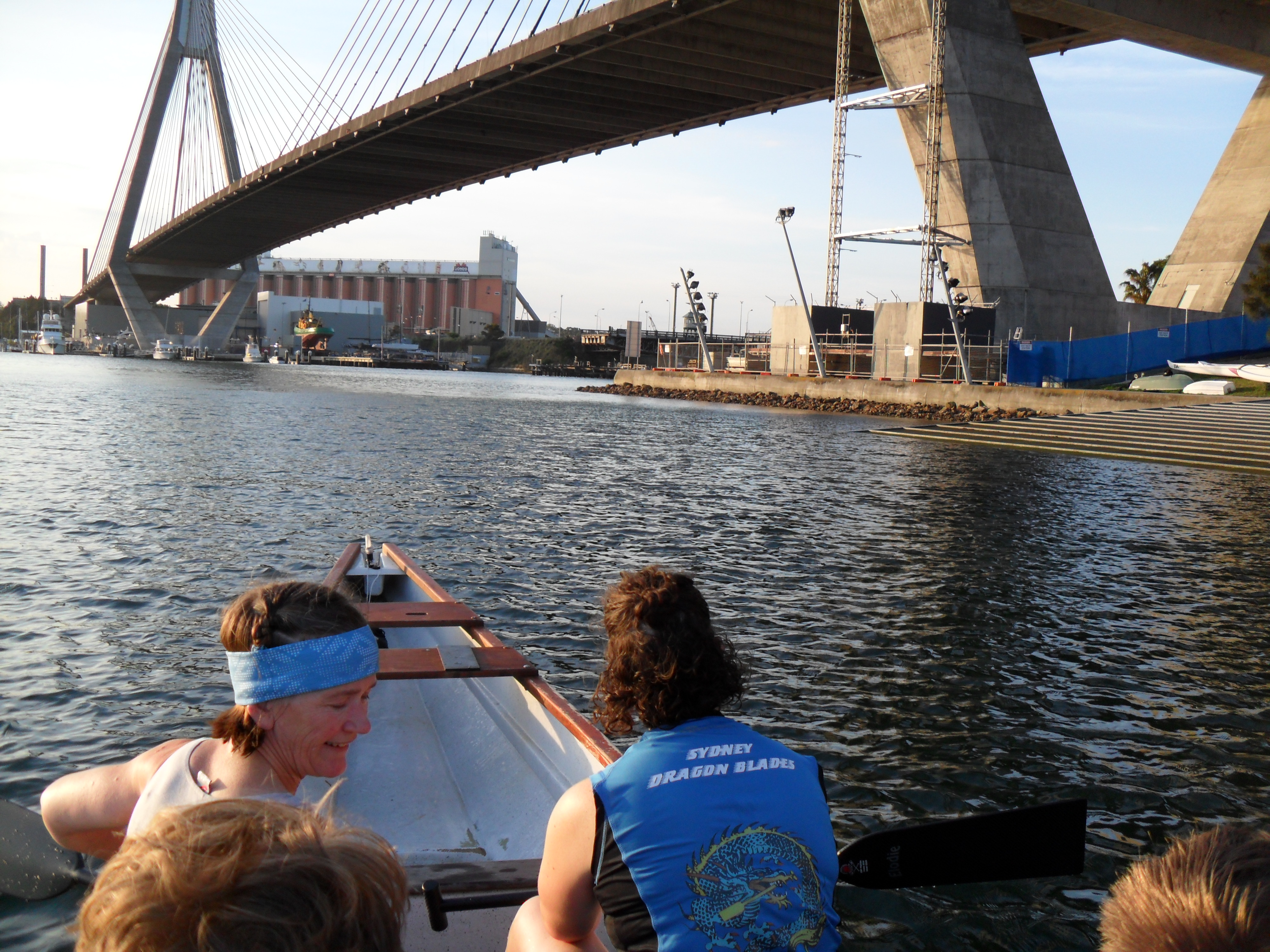
View of ANZAC Bridge from dragon boat on Blackwattle Bay

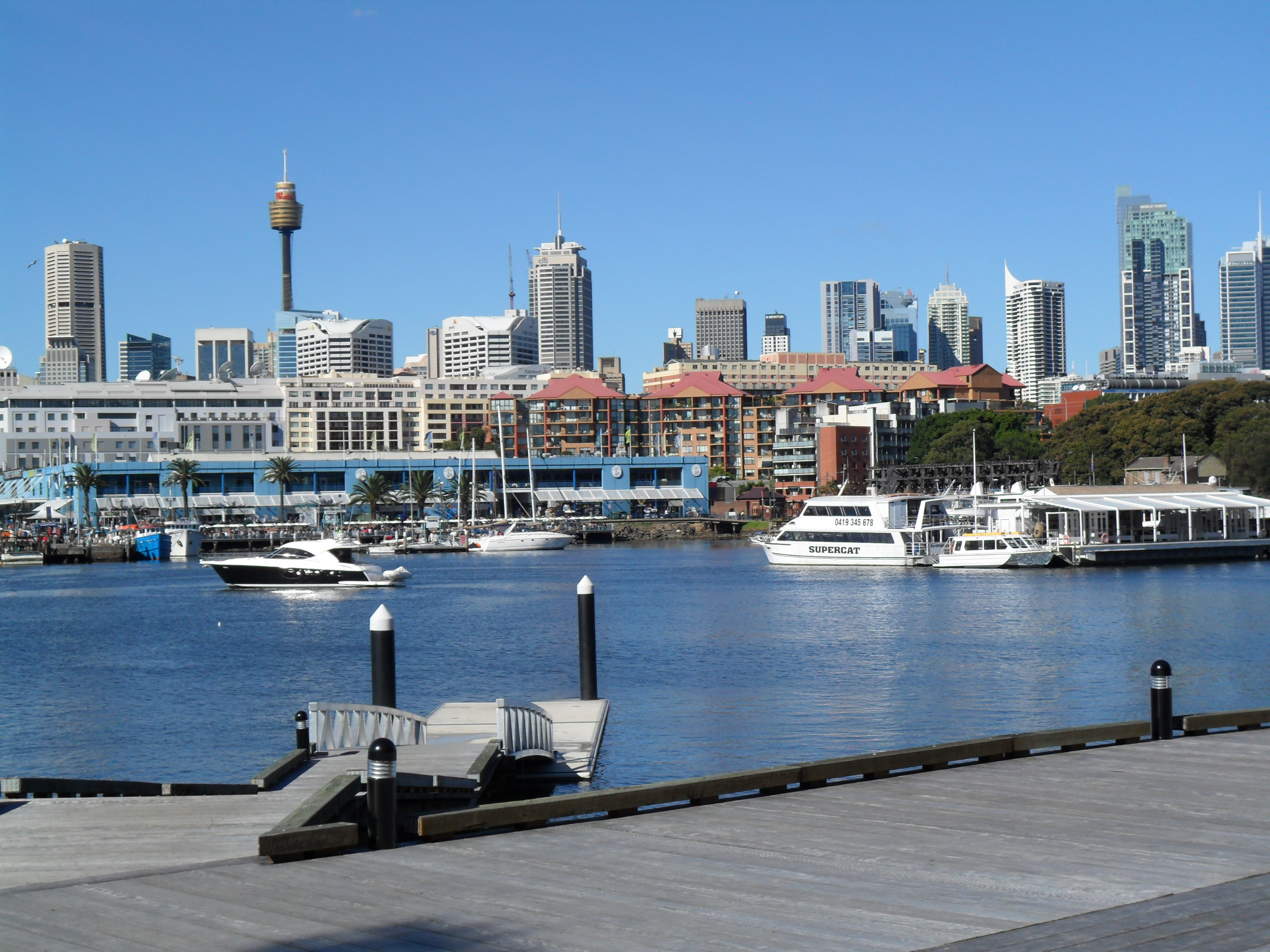
Blackwattle Bay, marina area
