= Sarina Air Raid Shelter =

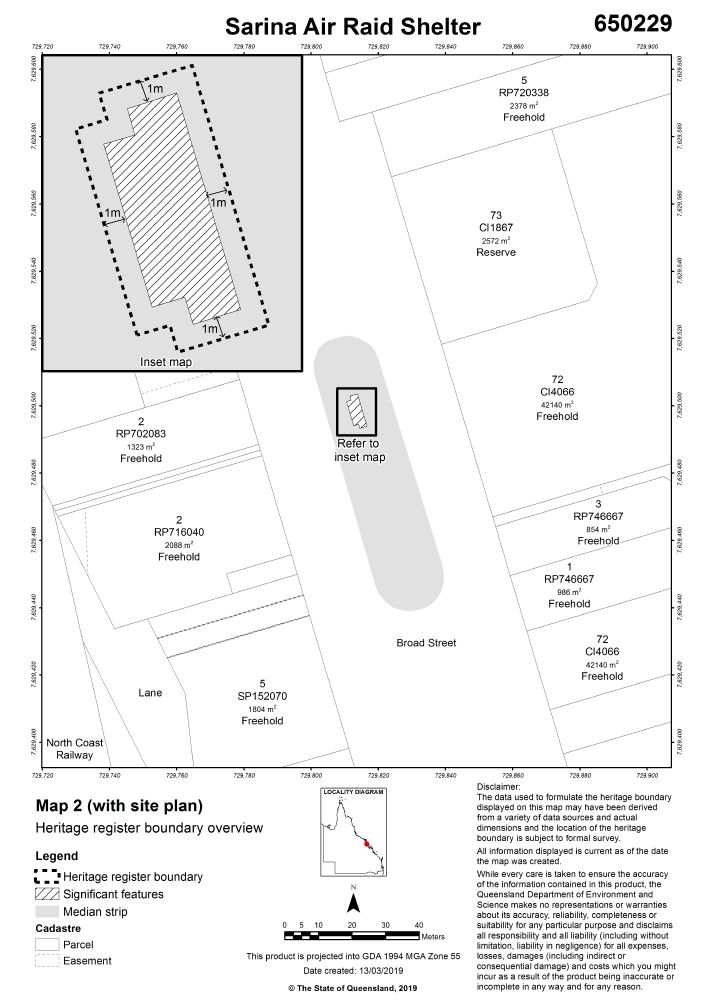
- Site map, 2019

- Location within Queensland
- 21.4222°S 149.2172°E
- Location: Broad Street, Sarina, Mackay Region, Queensland, Australia

History
- Design period: 1939–1945 (World War II)
- Built: 1942

Site notes
- Architectural style: Brutalism

Queensland Heritage Register
- Official name: Sarina Air Raid Shelter (former)
- Type: state heritage
- Designated: 3 May 2019
- Reference no.: 650229
- Type: Defence: Air raid shelter
- Theme: Maintaining order: Defending the country

Sarina Air Raid Shelter is a heritage-listed former air raid shelter at Broad Street, Sarina, Mackay Region, Queensland, Australia. It was built in 1942. It was added to the Queensland Heritage Register on 3 May 2019.

The Sarina Air Raid Shelter stands in the median strip of Broad Street (Bruce Highway) in Sarina, about 32 kilometres (20 mi) south of Mackay. It is the surviving one of two public reinforced concrete air raid shelters constructed in the street in early 1942. At this time Australia was at risk of air attack due to Japan's entry into World War II (WWII). Built by the Sarina Shire Council as a half-size version of a standard Department of Public Works (DPW) concrete air raid shelter, the Sarina shelter was adapted for other uses after WWII. It is one of the most intact of its type (T-shaped with toilet closets).

== History ==
Sarina, located on the banks of Plane Creek, is part of the traditional land of the Yuwibara people. The Plane Creek pastoral property, established in the 1860s, was opened for selection in 1880, which facilitated the local sugar cane-growing industry. The town, initially known as Plane Creek, grew after the opening of the Plane Creek Central Sugar Mill in 1896, and was renamed Sarina by 1907. At this time Sarina possessed three hotels, a police station and Plane Creek Provisional School. The Sarina Shire was formed in 1912, breaking away from the Pioneer Shire. The railway line reached Sarina from Mackay in 1913, and opened to St Lawrence in 1921, where it became an extension of the North Coast railway line from Rockhampton. In 1924, 60 shade trees were planted along the median strip of Broad Street, a wide thoroughfare and former stock route, which is the main business street of Sarina. In 1927 a "power alcohol" distillery opened next to the sugar mill, to produce ethanol from waste molasses. By 1933 Sarina had a population of 1747, up from 218 in 1901. The Plane Creek Power Alcohol Company was formed in 1926, and in 1927 was renamed the Australian National Power Alcohol Company. The distillery in Sarina was the first in Queensland, after the Commonwealth's Acetate of Lime Factory at Colmslie in Brisbane produced power alcohol from molasses from 1924 1926. Section 6 of Queensland's Motor Spirit Vendor's Act 1933 compelled petrol companies in Queensland to add ethanol to their petrol. The Sarina ethanol plant is still operating.

With the declaration of WWII in September 1939, the Queensland Premier's Department, as the agency responsible for co-ordinating civil defence works in the state, began implementing home security policies. Air Raid Protection Committees, usually consisting of the local mayor, inspector of police and government medical officer, formed in centres along the Queensland coast. As the threat of war with Japan increased, construction of public air raid shelters was planned in main centres considered vulnerable to air attack. These home security policies were outlined in the Commonwealth War Book, which was prepared before the outbreak of war and outlined measures to be taken by authorities in wartime.

On 8 December 1941, the United States of America entered the war, following the previous day's bombing of the American fleet at Pearl Harbor by Japanese carrier-borne aircraft. Simultaneously Japanese forces launched assaults on Thailand, the Philippines and the British colony of Malaya. Three days after the attack on Pearl Harbor, two capital ships of the Royal Navy (HMS Prince of Wales and HMS Repulse) were sunk by Japanese aircraft off the coast of Malaya. The sudden fall of Singapore on 15 February 1942 and the rapid Japanese advance through the islands of the Netherlands East Indies (NEI) raised fears of air attacks on Australia. The first Japanese air raid on Darwin occurred on 19 February, carried out by aircraft launched from four of the six aircraft carriers involved in the attack on Pearl Harbor, plus land-based aircraft flying from the NEI. During early 1942 Japanese air raids on other targets in Australia seemed likely, and a Japanese invasion of Australia was also feared. Japan briefly considered invading Australia (an idea promoted by the Imperial Japanese Navy, but rejected by the Japanese Army due to a lack of resources) before shelving that option in March 1942, in favour of isolating Australia from the United States by capturing Port Moresby, and later Fiji, New Caledonia and the Samoan Islands.

As a result, the Queensland Government closed all coastal state schools in late January 1942. Although most schools reopened on 2 March 1942, student attendance was optional until the war ended. A policy of voluntary evacuation of women and children from Queensland coastal areas was also implemented by the Queensland Government on 27 January 1942 with the voluntary evacuation zone was extended on 29 January 1942. The Australian Government opposed the mass evacuation of civilians. About 10,000 civilians moved during the voluntary evacuation, including 5,000 from Townsville.

Another result of the fear of air attack was the construction of air raid shelters. In the Protection of Persons and Property Order No.1, gazetted 23 December 1941, Premier William Forgan Smith ordered the Brisbane City Council to construct 200 public surface shelters in the city area (235 were eventually constructed). Order No.1 also required the owners of any building in the coastal areas, where over 30 people would normally be present at any one time, to build shelters within, or adjacent to, the building. Businesses such as hotels constructed shelters for their patrons. Queensland Railways (QR) also instituted a shelter-building program at its railway stations. The Queensland Premier acted with powers conferred by Regulation 35a, an amendment to the National Security (General) Regulations of the National Security Act 1939–1940. Regulation 35a, notified in the Commonwealth Government Gazette on 11 December 1941 (as Statutory Rules 1941 No.287), authorised each State Premier to direct "blackouts" and to "make such provision as he deems necessary to protect the persons and property of the civil population". In early February 1942 Queensland Railways claimed that local authorities should build public shelters near railway stations, rather than Queensland Railways having to build them on railway premises. At a conference in late February, the Secretary for Health and Home Affairs, E.M. Hanlon, stressed that if Queensland Railways did not act on building public air raid shelters it would make it harder for the Queensland Government to insist that other businesses and local authorities do so.

Order No.1 was applied state-wide, and another 24 local authorities in Queensland's coastal areas were ordered to produce surface or trench shelters for the public, to be built according to the Air Raid Shelter Code laid down in the Second Schedule of Order No.1. Initially, 19 of these local authorities were expected to construct a total of 133 surface shelters able to withstand the blast of a 500-pound bomb bursting 50 feet away. A surface shelter was a self-contained external structure with the floor surface at or above ground level. These surface shelters were only meant to protect people, caught by surprise out in the open, from blast and debris - not a direct hit. Five local authorities, including Sarina Shire Council (SSC), were ordered to dig trenches. Standard designs for brick and concrete surface shelters, and for trench shelters, were sent to local authorities by the Architectural Branch of the DPW.

However, as a result of a visit to Sarina on 24 December 1941 by Queensland Government staff, instead of digging trenches, Sarina constructed two "half-size" surface air raid shelters. The manager of the power alcohol distillery at Sarina was also ordered to construct a half-size concrete shelter. A report on the visit, by engineer Percy Ainscow of the Public Estate Improvement Branch, noted that "trenches were of no use in the town of Sarina [due to the wet ground, which was also an issue at Proserpine]. Approval was obtained for two small reinforced concrete shelters for Sarina, and authority to arrange for the erection of a shelter at the Power Alcohol Factory". Even before Pearl Harbor, the Australian Government sought to increase the production of power alcohol at Sarina, Pyrmont (Sydney) and Yarraville (Melbourne), to help the war effort. Extensions at Sarina were completed by March 1942. Pairs of half-size concrete shelters were also built at Home Hill and Proserpine.

Sarina"s half-size air raid shelters were based on the standard DPW design (January 1942) for a reinforced concrete air raid shelter. Although the half-size version had the same wall and roof thickness, and the same size entry corridors and toilet closets, the main shelter space was half the length of a full-size shelter. The full-size standard shelter had 12 inches (300 mm) thick walls, and a flat 6 inches (150 mm) roof (flush with the outside walls) - unless there was a risk of nearby buildings collapsing onto the shelter, in which case the roof had to be 12 inches (300 mm). The outside length of the front wall of the full-size standard shelter, not including toilets, was 39 feet 5 inches (12.01 m); while the total length of the rear wall (including toilets) was 47 feet 7 inches (14.50 m). The shelter was 12 feet (3.7 m). In Sarina"s case, although the width was the same, the shelter"s front wall was 7.7 metres (25 ft) long, while the total rear length was 9.9 metres (32 ft). The front walls of the toilet closets at each end of both the standard and half-size shelters were set back 5 feet (1.5 m) from the main front wall of the shelter, giving the shelters a symmetrical, fat "T" shape.

The two entrances to both the full-size and half-size shelters were at right angles to, and just inside, the front wall of the shelter. Each entrance made a 90-degree turn into a corridor towards the rear side of the shelter. Each corridor was formed by a 12-inch (300 mm) thick internal blast wall (separating the corridor from the main space of the shelter) to one side, and a 12-inch (300 mm) thick wall to a "closet" (containing a toilet) on the other side. From the end of each corridor, there were 90-degree turns either into the main shelter space, or the toilet closet, which was 5 feet (1.5 m) by 3 feet 1 inch (0.94 m) in size. Each internal blast wall had a recess through the top of its end for a lamp. The walls had angled corners (called a "haunch" in plans) to the floor and ceiling, while the height of the interior space was 7 feet 10 inches (2.39 m).

The main interior shelter space in the full-size version was 30 by 10 feet (9.1 by 3.0 m), with seating for 50 persons. This consisted of a central, double timber slat bench (set on five footings) for 30 people (15 facing each way); while a timber slat bench, for 20 people, was set (on seven footings) against the front wall of the main space, between the internal blast walls. In comparison, the half-size shelter"s main space was only 4.6 by 3 metres (15.1 ft × 9.8 ft). In the full-size shelter, seven offset air vents (doglegged, to avoid splinter penetration) were formed through both the front and back walls of the main shelter space; and each toilet closet also had three offset vents, for a total of 20. The half-size shelter only had four vents in each wall of the main shelter space, for a total of 14 vents, including the toilet closet vents.

By 9 January 1942, the steel for Sarina"s shelters, which would be built by the SSC, was being cut and bent, and construction commenced around mid-January. It was announced that the shelters would be 32 by 12 feet (9.8 m × 3.7 m)in size, with four rows of seats to accommodate 40–50 people. The number able to be seated in these half-size shelters seems high, given that there was only seating for 50 in a full size shelter. By comparison, Proserpine"s half-sized shelters only had seating for 25. However, there was supposedly an extra row of seats in Sarina's half-size shelter. Local authorities were informed that the cost of shelters would, in the first instance, be borne by the Queensland Government, but ultimate financial responsibility had not been determined, and they would be informed later of the allocation of financial responsibility. The first half-size concrete shelter was built in Broad Street "just opposite Kelly's" (in 2019 the National Australia Bank, corner of Broad Street and the Marlborough-Sarina Road). The second shelter (the surviving air raid shelter) was originally planned for Central Street, near the railway crossing, but as QR was building its own (trench) shelters nearby, it was relocated to Broad Street, to the north of the first shelter: in front (west) of Sarina State School and within 50 metres (160 ft) of the Post Office. At a council meeting on 15 January 1942, Cr J Langdon had moved that DPW be asked to place any second shelter near the flag pole in Broad Street. The first shelter was finished by 14 February 1942, and the second by 28 February 1942.

The number of shelters to be built, and the number of local authorities required to build them, was increased in January 1942. By 26 January, 26 local authorities outside Brisbane were expected to build 143 surface air raid shelters, with Cardwell Shire Council and Redcliffe Town Council constructing trenches while Ipswich City Council built a combination of surface shelters and trenches. Ultimately, those local authorities outside Brisbane which had work funded by the DPW, built 133 shelters - 126 surface shelters, and seven underground (the latter at Bundaberg and Mount Morgan). In five cases (Atherton, Cairns, Gladstone, Mackay, and Toowoomba) the DPW built the shelters without local authority assistance. Some local authorities, like Brisbane, undertook and funded their own shelter building program. Brisbane City Council spent £88,933 of its own funds; Coolangatta Town Council spent £150, and Warwick City Council spent £565.

The DPW's construction program outside Brisbane cost £56,596; £30,929 worth of the work was undertaken by the DPW, and the rest by local authorities with funds provided by the DPW. However, problems arose when the DPW asked the local authorities to pay half the total cost. Townsville City Council, Toowoomba City Council, Gladstone City Council, and Ayr Shire Council denied liability for costs, and a Bill was passed in December 1942 to force their compliance. The Ayr Shire Council claimed that the shelters would be death traps during an air raid, as they concentrated people in one place, and would be a target for low-flying aircraft.

The SSC was also not happy having to pay half the total cost £1124/17/1 of its two air raid shelters, claiming it was led to believe that the Queensland Government would pay the full cost; it could have built cheaper shelters than the DPW's design; and QR had been allowed to build timber trench shelters at the Sarina railway station. However, the SSC applied for, and received, a loan to cover its liability. £318/6/4 of the cost of Sarina's two shelters was direct expenditure by the DPW, while £806/10/9 was "recouped" (paid) to the SSC for its work at the time. Sarina was later billed for half the total cost. Sarina's two half-size shelters cost more than the pairs of half-size shelters constructed at Home Hill and Proserpine: which cost £767 and £869 respectively. A Department of Lands investigation later found that the cost of Sarina's shelters was abnormally high. The relative expense of Sarina's shelters may have contributed to the SSC's decision to retain its shelters for post-war reuse.

As well as building air raid shelters, the SSC undertook other Air Raid Precaution (ARP) measures in early 1942. By early January, shades had been put over street lights, and the fire brigade was testing water hydrants; householders had to have sand available to extinguish incendiary bombs, and government building windows were covered in cheesecloth. In February, to raise funds for equipment for the local emergency hospitals, the Sarina ARP Organisation held a euchre party and dance in the School of Arts hall. In March 1942 the SSC requested 12 steel helmets for its Rescue and Demolition Squad. It later borrowed £1400 from the Queensland Government for an emergency water supply. Air raid drills occurred in March and June 1942, with one being a surprise test of the sirens which resulted in the public air raid shelters being rapidly filled.

As the threat of Japanese air attack diminished, Queensland's public air raid shelters became unnecessary. In March 1944 a report to the Commonwealth's Defence Committee recommended reducing the anti-aircraft defences of Cairns and Townsville, given they were now out of normal range of Japanese land-based bombers, due to the neutralisation of Japanese air bases such as Rabaul. By December 1944 the Civil Defence Organisation (CDO) was permitting the removal of air raid shelters, with half the cost, once again, to be paid by local authorities.

Although calls were made to remove the "unsightly" trench shelters at the Sarina railway station, the SSC did not demolish the concrete surface shelters on Broad Street. By early December 1945, when the Sarina branch of the Australian Communist Party suggested converting the surface shelters to rest rooms for country visitors, the SSC had already let a contract to convert "the top shelter" (the surviving shelter) into a women's toilet and wash room, with water and electricity connected. The existing four windows, cut into the shelter's walls, were probably formed at this time. In 2019, the mural on the shelter is circa 30 years old. The fate of the half-size air raid shelter at the power alcohol factory is unknown. In 1947, the other public air raid shelter was converted into a public library with the addition of electric lights, doors and windows, and officially opened in March 1948. The Chairman of the SSC noted that the council "had deemed to it wise to retain the building, in case some use could be made of it". He also stated it would "remind people in the years to come that the Jap [sic] was once knocking on Australia's door". In 1960 the SSC considered converting this shelter into men's toilets, should it be vacated by the library, but this did not eventuate. After the library moved to the memorial hall, the former air raid shelter/library was demolished in 1979.

Home Hill's half-size shelters were demolished c. 1947. Proserpine's half-size shelters were converted for storage c. 1950 (in the Council yard) and 1954 (in the Courthouse yard), but both were later demolished.

Other known surviving public air raid shelters (T-shaped, with toilet closets) are located at: Babinda (Babinda Air Raid Shelter, with a new concrete dividing wall added, for use as a public toilet); Gordonvale (northern end and toilet closet only); and the old Gympie Court House and Lands Office (with one internal blast wall removed and converted to a sound recording studio). A number of Queensland Rail air raid shelters (T-shaped, with toilet closets) also still exist at Maryborough railway station complex (with internal blast walls removed) and at Toowoomba railway station (brick with internal blast walls removed). Elsewhere in Queensland, T-shaped public air raid shelters without toilets (entrances are set back and face the rear of the shelter, and the corridors make a single 90 degree turn into the main shelter space) survive at Landsborough railway station (the Landsborough Air Raid Shelter) and at Shorncliffe railway station.

Public shelters without toilets (entrances are not set back, and the shelter is rectangular) survive at Queens Wharf Road, Brisbane (North Quay porphyry wall); Ferguson Street, Manly (timber building added above); and the Maryborough Courthouse. Although most of Brisbane's public air raid shelters were demolished, 20 rectangular shelters, designed to have three or four of their walls removed at the end of the war for use as bus or park shelters, also survive. In 2019, 16 of Brisbane's 20 surviving reusable public air raid shelters (with walls removed) are included in the Queensland Heritage Register. As well as public shelters, rectangular commercial premises' (private) concrete or brick shelters are known to survive, including:

- Redcliffe's Ambassador Hotel (used as a drive-through bottle shop)
- Coronation Hotel, South Brisbane
- Storey Bridge Hotel, Kangaroo Point
- Broadway Hotel, Woolloongabba
- the former brewery on Mort Street, Toowoomba
- Thomas Dixon Boot Factory, West End (brick)
- Newtown Hotel, Anzac Avenue, Toowoomba
- the rear of the Westpac Bank on the corner of Margaret and Ruthven Streets, Toowoomba (brick)
- Howard Smith Wharves (three shelters of the T-shaped type without toilets and two "pipe" style concrete shelters, all for wharf workers)
- Toowoomba railway station (T-shaped concrete shelter with toilets for railway employees)

In 2019, Sarina's former air raid shelter is used as office and storage space for council gardeners. It is one of the most intact surviving examples of the DPW's standard T-shaped air raid shelter with toilet closets, retaining its two internal blast walls, complete with lamp recesses; and its two original toilet closets. Most of Queensland's public surface air raid shelters were demolished after WWII, and surviving examples which retain their toilet closets and both their internal blast walls are now rare.

== Description ==
The Sarina Air Raid Shelter (the shelter) is positioned near the northern end of the median strip of Broad Street, the main street and highway through the town of Sarina, approximately 25 kilometres (16 mi) south of Mackay. The grassed median strip is located between car park spaces and double lanes for north and south-bound traffic. The shelter is in the western half of the median strip, which in this location is about 20 metres (66 ft) wide. The Sarina State School is about 30 metres (98 ft) east of the shelter, and the town's pre-WWII Post Office is about 40 metres (130 ft) to the northwest. In 2019 the shelter is used as office and storage space for the local council's gardeners.

Built in 1942, the above-ground shelter is a box-shaped, off-form reinforced concrete structure, approximately 10 by 3.7 metres (33 by 12 ft) wide. It is oriented roughly north-south lengthwise, with its front wall facing west, about 7 metres (23 ft) from the street. The shelter accommodates a large main chamber, and one toilet closet at each end. These closets are set back 1.5 metres (4 ft 11 in) east of the main west wall, giving the shelter a symmetrical, fat "T" shape. All exterior and internal concrete walls are 305 millimetres (12.0 in) thick, and the flat concrete roof is 152 millimetres (6.0 in) thick.

The shelter has two entrances (one at the north, one at the south) with a small 90-degree corridor towards the rear of the shelter, formed by an internal blast wall (separating the corridor from the main space of the shelter). From the end of each corridor, there are 90 degree turns either into the main shelter space, or into the toilet closet. The main interior shelter space measures 4.6 metres (15 ft) between the internal blast walls, and 3 metres (9.8 ft) between the front and rear walls of the shelter. Evidence of bench seating survives within the main shelter space.

Post-war modifications include four openings cut through the east and west walls of the shelter to form windows (likely for the 1945 conversion to a women's toilet).

== Heritage listing ==
Sarina Air Raid Shelter was listed on the Queensland Heritage Register on 3 May 2019 having satisfied the following criteria.

The place is important in demonstrating the evolution or pattern of Queensland's history.

The Sarina Air Raid Shelter, a public air raid shelter built by the Sarina Shire Council in 1942, is important in demonstrating the impact of Japan's entry into World War II (WWII) on Queensland's civilian population, and the urgent Air Raid Precaution measures undertaken in 1941–42. It is a product of the Protection of Persons and Property Order No.1, gazetted in December 1941, which ordered Queensland's local authorities to construct public air raid shelters.

The place demonstrates rare, uncommon or endangered aspects of Queensland's cultural heritage.

Although hundreds of public air raid shelters were constructed during 1942 in Queensland, few survive intact. The Sarina Air Raid Shelter is one of the most intact public air raid shelters of its type (T-shaped with toilet closets) in Queensland.

The place is important in demonstrating the principal characteristics of a particular class of cultural places.

The Sarina Air Raid Shelter is important in demonstrating the principal characteristics of a WWII concrete surface shelter built for public protection in Queensland. The extant features demonstrate the design, solid construction and dimensions of a half-size version of the standard DPW public air raid shelter (T-shaped with toilet closets). Surviving characteristics include: the reinforced concrete floor, walls and roof; angled corners to the floor and roof; air vents; two entrances; two toilet closets; two internal blast walls with lamp recesses; and evidence of its internal rows of bench seating. Its siting in an easily accessible location, within an area with a concentration of civilians - in this case in the main street of Sarina - is also a defining characteristic of public air raid shelters.
