= Devil's pool (disambiguation) =

Devil's Pool is a natural pool at the confluence of three streams near Babinda, Queensland, Australia.

Devil's Pool or Devil's pool may also refer to:

- Devil's Pool (Victoria Falls), a natural pool at the edge of Victoria Falls, Africa that is occasionally safe for swimming
- Devil's Pool (Pennsylvania) the section of Cresheim Creek just before its confluence with Wissahickon Creek in Philadelphia
- Devil's pool, a form of pin billiards native to Australia, making use of upright obelisk-like "pins" as targets and/or obstacles, depending upon game variant
- The Devil's Pool, the title generally given to English translations of George Sand's novel La Mare au diable
- "Devil's Pool", a song by Beach House, from the EP Become
