= Commonwealth Acetate of Lime Factory =

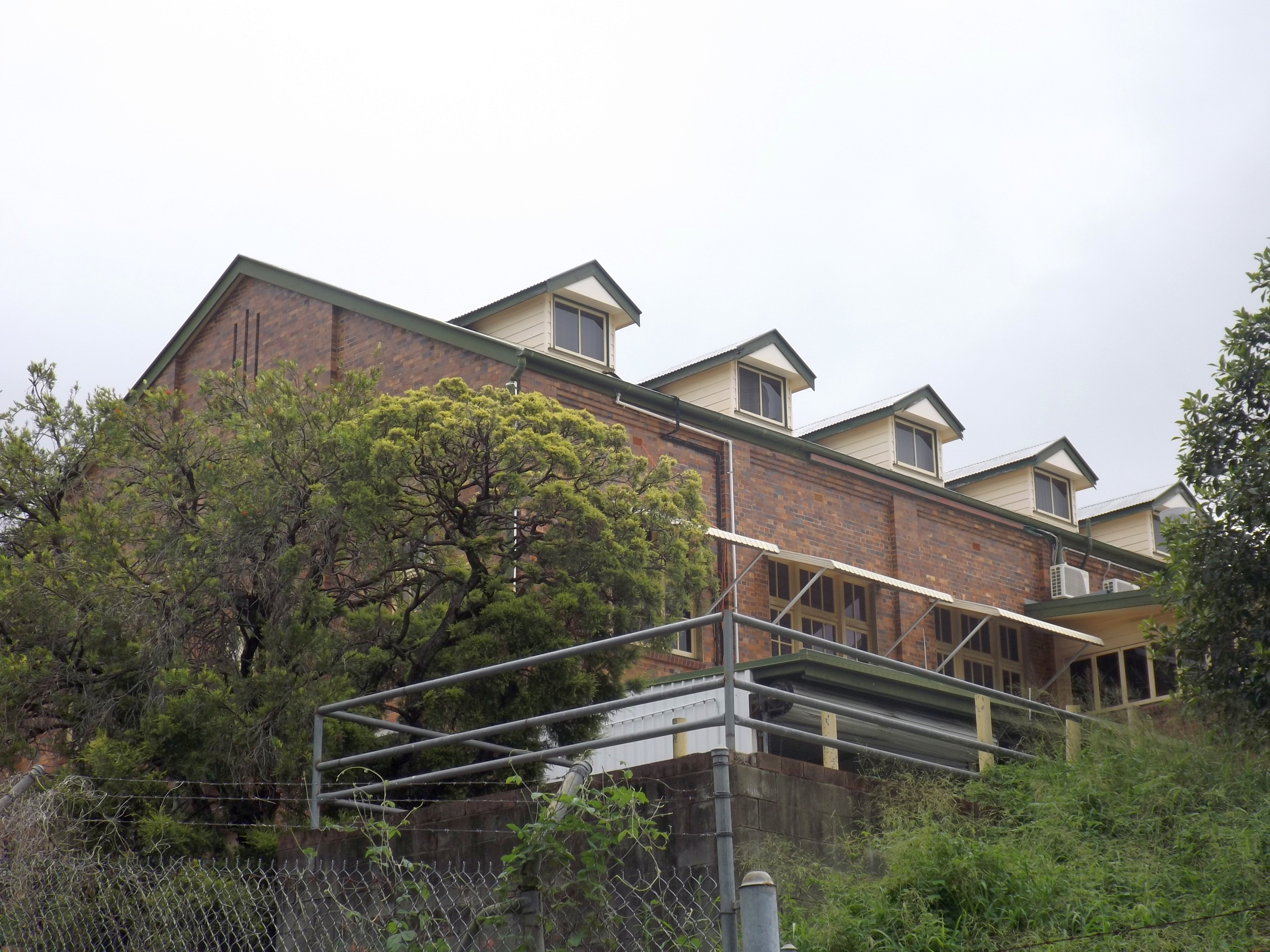
- The structure in 2015

- Location within Queensland Location within Australia
- 27.4514°S 153.0886°E
- Location: 82 Colmslie Road, Morningside, City of Brisbane, Queensland, Australia

Queensland Heritage Register
- Official name: Commonwealth Acetate of Lime Factory (former), Colmslie Migrant Hostel, Fairmile Naval Base, Hans Continental Smallgoods Factory, HMAS Moreton, Colmslie
- Type: state heritage (built)
- Designated: 7 December 2007
- Reference no.: 602465
- Significant period: 1910s–1920s (fabric); 1910s–1940s (factory); 1940s (military use); 1950s–1960s (migrant accommodation)

Commonwealth Acetate of Lime Factory is a heritage-listed factory at 82 Colmslie Road, Morningside, City of Brisbane, Queensland, Australia. It is also known as Colmslie Migrant Hostel, Fairmile Naval Base, Hans Continental Smallgoods Factory, and HMAS Moreton, Colmslie. It was added to the Queensland Heritage Register on 7 December 2007.

== History ==
The former Commonwealth Acetate of Lime Factory at Colmslie consists of a number of brick and timber buildings built between 1917 and 1920. Two timber demountable blocks were added as migrant accommodation c.1949. Since the early 1970s most of the site has been occupied by Hans Continental Smallgoods Pty Ltd, which has constructed a modern factory on the southern part of property. The remaining original buildings are used as offices and for storage. The riverfront fish markets have occupied the northern part of the original factory site since 1966.

During World War I the Australian Commonwealth Arsenal developed its own defence factories, due to disruption of the supply of manufactured goods and armaments to Australia. By 1919 the defence factories included the Lithgow Small Arms Factory in Lithgow, New South Wales; a Clothing Factory in South Melbourne; and the Defence Explosive Factory Maribyrnong (Cordite) at Maribyrnong, Melbourne; a Government Woollen Mill; and the Acetate of Lime Factory at Colmslie, Brisbane. The latter provided acetate of lime for cordite production at Maribyrnong.

After World War I the Australian government sought to protect the local steel, copper, chemical, and woollen textile industries, which had grown during the war, and to promote research and development. Government factories and laboratories were to provide a knowledge pool for the private sector, and the latter would then be able to help supply the country's defence needs in wartime. This policy of "Self Containment" led to Australia being able to supply itself with light weapons and ammunition by World War II. The Munitions Supply Board (1921 to 1939) inherited the defence factories of the Commonwealth Arsenal, and its High Explosives and Filling Factory Group in Victoria became the centre of chemical engineering in Australia. Other Munitions Supply Board assets in the 1920s included the Ordnance Factory Group, Gun Ammunition Factory Group, and Small Arms Ammunition Factory in Victoria, and the Small Arms Factory Group in New South Wales. The Munitions Supply Board thus controlled the largest and most advanced factory system in Australia, and the largest industrial research laboratories, under the Munitions Supply Laboratories organisation.

A committee from the Commonwealth Department of Home Affairs selected a site for the Acetate of Lime Factory at Colmslie in mid 1916, after Cairns was considered and rejected. Subdivisions 2 and 3 of Eastern Suburban Allotment 22, Parish of Bulimba, County of Stanley, covering 9 acres (3.6 ha) 2 roods 29.5 perches (2,770 m^{2}) were resumed on 21 September 1916 at a cost of £1,719. A plan drawn up by the Department of Home Affairs in November 1916, and signed "HJB", laid out the main built elements of the factory, and their function, as designed by the bacteriologist and chemist Auguste de Bavay.

Born in Belgium, De Bavay had worked for a number of breweries (including Fosters, Swan, Cascade, Carlton and United), as well as working in the mining industry, and in the paper industry. He had designed the revolutionary ore-extraction technique of the "skin" or "film" flotation process, patented in 1905, to deal with "the Sulphide Problem". In 1914 de Bavay was asked by the Minister of Defence to investigate the manufacture of acetone for use in cordite manufacture, and in two weeks he had developed a process to ferment and distil molasses. He was later asked to build the Colmslie factory, which had a well-equipped chemical and bacteriological laboratory. His son, Francis Xavier de Bavay, became the first manager of the factory.

The cost of the factory was about £120,000. Production began in 1918, with 30 employees, and continued after the war ended, in order to lay up reserve supplies. When production of acetate of lime (calcium acetate) ceased early in 1922, about 1,000 metric tons (980 long tons; 1,100 short tons) had been made; enough to produce 200 metric tons (200 long tons; 220 short tons) of acetone, leading to 1,000 metric tons (980 long tons; 1,100 short tons) of cordite, or about 400 million rounds of .303-inch (7.7 mm) rifle cartridges.

The process of making acetate of lime started with molasses (from the Babinda Sugar Mill and Mulgrave sugar mill) that had been shipped from Cairns to Brisbane. The molasses was pumped into a holding tank near the river, and was diluted with water. The liquid was then heated and cooled in the three-storey Agitator and Cooler House, to destroy foreign bacteria. In the two-storey Fermenting House yeast was added to large wooden temperature-controlled vats, with fermentation producing a dilute (8%) solution of alcohol (ethanol). The "wash" was transferred to vats on the top floor of the three-storey Settling House, where it was allowed to settle out. The wash was then transferred to the adjacent three-storey Acidifier House, where it was repeatedly pumped through wooden vats, which contained wood shavings and Bacterium Aceti. Over several days, the alcohol was converted into acetic acid (vinegar). The new wash was heated by steam coils, and the acetic acid and water was distilled off, in the two-storey Evaporator House. The acid distillate was neutralised with milk of lime to produce acetate of lime, and this solution was concentrated for evaporation on a heated revolving drum, where it was scraped off as solid flakes. The bagged product was then sent to Maribyrnong for conversion into acetone. Acetone enabled the combination of nitroglycerine and trinitrocellulose to form cordite.

Alcohol distillation at the factory was approved in 1919, due to shortages of certain grades of concentrated alcohol, and the dilute alcohol produced by the fermentation of molasses was distilled to produce concentrated alcohol in the Alcohol Still House, a two-storey eastern extension to the Evaporator House. From early 1920 a pot still was used to produce alcohol for the ammunition factories, and in 1922 a continuous still was installed.

Due to fears that oil resources were limited, alcohol produced from molasses was also considered as an alternative fuel. "Power alcohol" was manufactured at Colmslie from August 1924 to June 1926, before production was halted by concerns that the cost was too high. Approximately 800 kilolitres of this alcohol was made, and was mixed with benzol and ether to produce 1200 kilolitres of motor fuel. This fuel was used by the Post Master General's Department, in its postal vehicles in Brisbane and Melbourne, and by Royal Australian Air Force (RAAF) vehicles in Victoria.

From 1926 the factory was closed down to a reserve status, under a caretaker. In 1935 the factory's plant was moved to the Footscray and Maribyrnong factories in Melbourne, and the factory was handed over to the Department of the Interior in January 1936. In June 1936 the idea was floated that the Post Master General's Department could use a building for its frequency measuring equipment, using the chimney and water tower to mount aerials. The Department's Radio Broadcasting Branch, Wireless Experimental Section, occupied various buildings from 1937, including the Acidifier House and the Fitter's shop.

The Wireless Experimental Section's peace and quiet was disturbed when an advance party of RAAF personnel arrived at the factory on 23 May 1939. Several factory buildings were required for billeting and storage purposes while the RAAF was awaiting the completion of huts at Archerfield. The Ordnance Service also staked a claim for storage space from February 1940 onwards, and the Field Hygiene Section of the Seventh Division occupied a number of buildings in late 1940. The Engineer's Supply Service branch arrived in April 1941, and the Allied Works Council was present in 1942. The 6th Anti Aircraft battery was a resident by June 1942 and the 2nd and 14th AA batteries by August 1943.

The Post Master General, Ordnance Services, and the Anti Aircraft batteries were still using some buildings in October 1943, but from November 1942 onwards the Royal Australian Navy (RAN) gradually took over most of the complex, which became part of the Fairmile Naval Base (by 1948 the base was referred to as 'HMAS Moreton, Colmslie'). The factory's jetty became a refuelling wharf, and navy workshops and a repair slipway were built between the factory and the river.

New tenants were soon to follow. In December 1943 Prime Minister Curtin had expressed the view that, for security reasons, Australia's population had to increase to 20 million. The Commonwealth Department of Immigration was created in 1945, and in 1946 the goal was to allow 70,000 migrants into Australia each year, (roughly 1% of Australia's population at the time). The United Kingdom-Australia Free and Assisted Passage Agreements became active in March 1947. Adults would only pay £10 towards their passage, and children aged 14–18 would be charged £5. A shipping shortage handicapped the program until 1948, but from 1947 to 1958, of 457,898 migrants moving from the United Kingdom to Australia, 68% received assisted passage. In this period the British represented about a third of all migrants to Australia. The peak years of assisted British migration to Australia were between 1949 and 1952.

In order to address labour shortages, the Australian Government also decided to use another source of immigrants: the mass of Displaced Persons in Europe. In July 1947 an agreement was reached with the United Nations' International Refugee Organisation, which would provide the ships to deliver a minimum of 12,000 Displaced Persons per year. This was the first assisted passage scheme for non-British migrants. The migrants included people from the Baltic States of Latvia, Estonia, and Lithuania. Other Displaced Persons came from Eastern and Central Europe, including Czechs, Yugoslavs, Ukrainians, Hungarians and Poles. By 1951, about 170,000 Displaced Persons had moved to Australia.

In 1949 the Migrant Accommodation Centres Division was formed within the Commonwealth Department of Immigration. It was decided that Displaced Persons would go to Holding Centres, where the dependants would stay until the "breadwinner" of the family, working in the vicinity of the Holding Centre, could afford accommodation elsewhere. However, if a worker was allocated to a Worker's Hostel that had room for dependants, the family might be able to live together at the hostel. Although the Department of Immigration administered Holding Centres, the Department of Labour and National Service administered Worker's Hostels.

In June 1949 the Department of Immigration was planning to open four Holding Centres for "New Australians" in Queensland. Wacol opened 9 November 1949, on Army land; Stuart, on RAAF land south of Townsville (the former Operations and Signals Bunker at Stuart) opened 30 March 1950; Frazer's Paddock at Enoggera opened 14 April 1950, on Army land; and Cairns opened 19 August 1950, on acquired land. In 1952 the standard capacities of these camps were listed as: Wacol 1465; Stuart 500; Enoggera 515; and Cairns 370. At this time 13 Holding Centres were still active in Australia. By April 1960 Wacol was the only migrant Holding Centre left in Queensland.

In mid 1948 the Director of Migrant Hostels had visited the old Acetate of Lime Factory, now acting as a naval barracks, with representatives from the Department of Labour and National Service, and the Department of Works and Housing. In December 1948 the Department of Labour and National Service had asked the RAN for the use of the factory buildings for Baltic Displaced Persons, and the site was transferred from the Department of Interior to the Department of Labour and National Service. However, the land near the river would be used by the Army. In June 1949 it was reported that there would be a Worker's Hostel at Colmslie with a projected capacity of 500 persons. The existing buildings of the Acetate of Lime Factory would provide accommodation, but a number of timber huts were also added the site, as illustrated on an April 1949 map by the Commonwealth Department of Works and Housing (the huts are not present on a 1948 site map prepared by the Department of the Interior). Two of these huts, which were used as six room sleeping blocks, remain on site today, to the north of the brick Engineer's Office and Fitter's shop. By December 1949 the term "Colmslie Migrant Hostel" was being used in correspondence.

Initial government policy was that British migrants would not be sent to Holding Centres. The Immigration Depot at Yungaba, Kangaroo Point, was remodelled to receive the first post-World War II British migrants to Queensland, who left Britain in May 1947. In general though, Yungaba was used as transit depot for those British migrants who had their own accommodation arranged. British migrants who needed longer-term accommodation would be housed at Workers' Hostels.

In January 1952 "Commonwealth Hostels Limited" took over management of the Colmslie Migrant Hostel. Although it was policy that assisted British migrants should live at hostels, there were also non-British migrants at Colmslie in the late 1950s. According to one woman who lived there between 1959 and 1962, these included Germans, Finns, Danes, Yugoslavs, and Russians. Mr Flood, the hostel's Manager at the time, lived in a bungalow (no longer extant) surrounded by palm trees and hibiscus. This was originally the Factory manager's office and laboratory, situated south of the Evaporator House.

As part of the Colmslie Migrant Hostel, the Acidifier House was used for accommodation, and as a dining room and kitchen. The Engineer's Office and Fitter's Shop became a baggage store and the Assistant Manager's quarters, and the Winch House became a tool room. The Evaporator House was used for accommodation, ablutions and recreation, and the Alcohol Still house was also used for accommodation. The Engine Room was used for accommodation and recreation, and the Boiler House was used as a laundry. The Lime Slacking Store became an office, and the Excise Office, Fertiliser House and Painter's Shop building (extended to the south around 1949) became a store.

The desire to keep the British out of Holding Centres seems to have weakened over time, since by 1959 it was suggested that Wacol could be used for British migrants. Due to the June 1959 "Nest Egg Scheme", whereby British migrants with £500 in savings could get assisted passage without an accommodation sponsor in Australia, there was a need for emergency accommodation. Yungaba and Colmslie were to be used first, but any extra British could join the Dutch migrants at Wacol.

In November 1960 the RAN declared its remaining land near the hostel as surplus to requirements. The RAN workshops, slipway and jetty, which had been occupied by the Army's Small Boat Squadron since 1956, had been declared surplus by the Army by April 1960. The land adjoining the Hostel was thus transferred from the Department of Interior to the Department of Immigration in March 1962, and in 1966 this waterfront area, with the workshops, slipway, and part of the hostel grounds, was transferred to the Queensland Fish Board. The two-storied Fermentation House of the Acetate of Lime Factory still stands on this land, which now contains the Brisbane Fish Markets.

In January 1963 the Colmslie Migrant Hostel had a capacity of 270, with 30 Families resident. It was closed on 31 March 1963. Those migrants who could not find new accommodation were allowed to go to Wacol, which Commonwealth Hostels was taking over from the Department of Immigration. It appears that the Hostel was briefly reactivated in 1965, before closing permanently. Hans Van der Drift, a Dutch-born chef, started Hans Continental Smallgoods in Ascot in 1960, and his company occupied the remainder of the Colmslie hostel site in the early 1970s.

Although the molasses storage tanks and Montejus pit near the river were demolished before the end of World War II, and the Agitator and Cooling House, Settling Tank House, and Laboratory/Bungalow have disappeared since World War II, a number of the main buildings involved in the process of producing acetate of lime are still present on the site. However, the top two floors of the Acidifier House were removed some time after 1965, and with its modern cladding the building no longer resembles its earlier form.

== Description ==
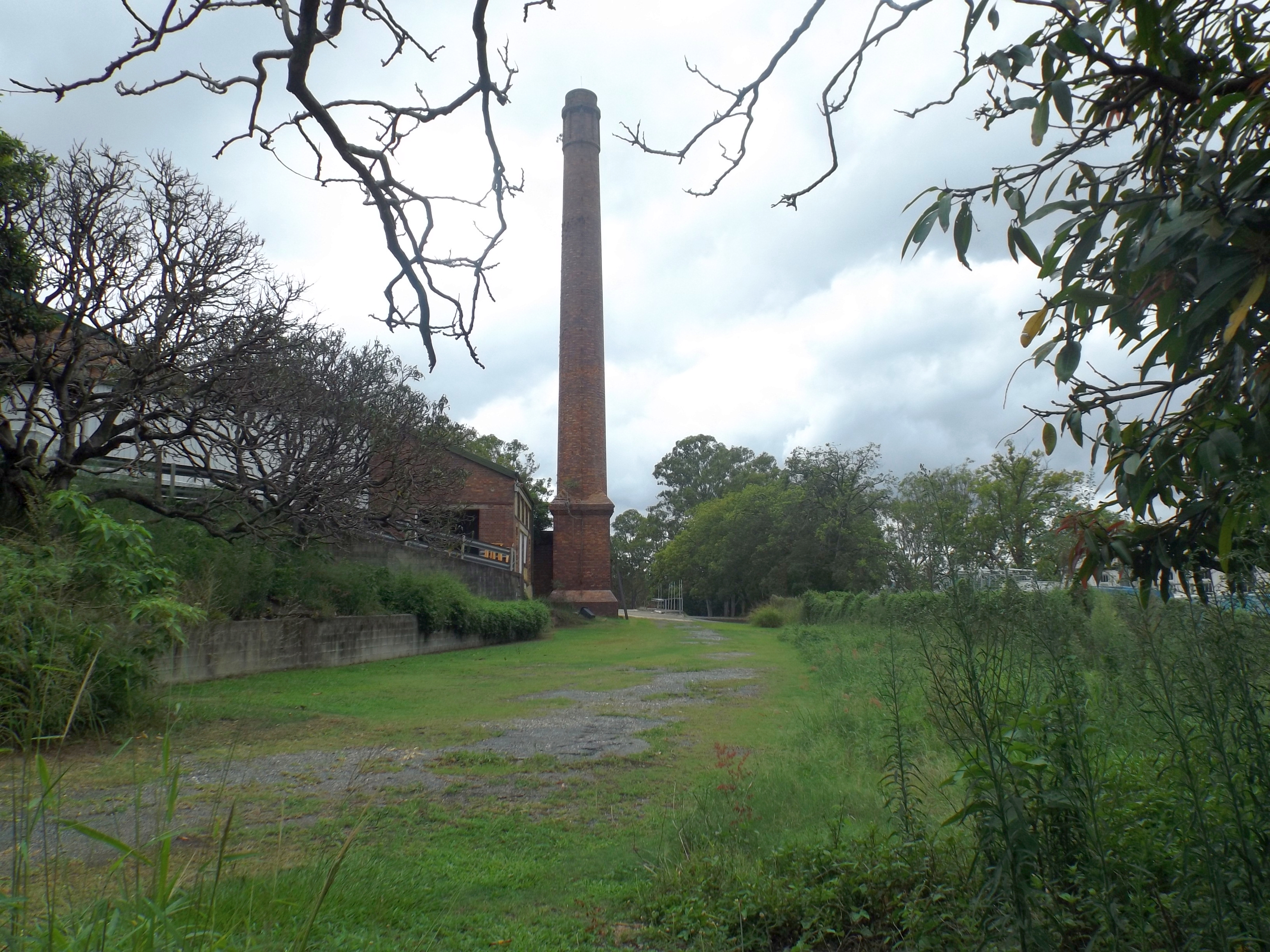
Chimney in 2015

The former Acetate of Lime Factory, now a part of the Hans Continental Smallgoods factory, is accessed from Colmslie Road. A large modern factory building occupies most of the southern part of the site. The original factory buildings are further north, and are stepped down the north face of the slope towards the Brisbane River. Elements of the Acetate of Lime Factory that still exist on the eastern side of the internal roadway include: the Lime Slacking Store and the Lime Slacking House; the Excise Office, Fertilizer House and Painters' Shop building; the Evaporator House and Alcohol Still House; the Engine Room; the Boiler House and Chimney; and a small latrine block. To the west of the internal road are: the ground floor of the Acidifier House; the Winch House, and the Engineers' Office and Fitters' Shop. To the north of the Engineers' Office and Fitters' shop are two huts that were introduced as extra migrant accommodation.

The Lime Slacking Store is an L-shaped single-storey building, built of brick with a hipped roof clad in corrugated iron. It has been converted into a cold room. Some of the double-hung sash windows have been bricked over, while others have been painted over. A brick-lined gutter runs along the ground on the south side of the building. Just north of the store is the small, brick Lime Slacking House, which is visually obscured by a modern metal-clad extension to the south of the Alcohol Still House. Just to the west of the Lime Slacking Store is the T-shaped single storey timber Excise Office, Fertilizer House and Painters' Shop building, which is clad in weatherboards and has a hipped roof clad in corrugated iron. Between the Excise Office, Fertilizer House and Painters' Shop building and the Evaporator House is a concrete retaining wall.

Further north, the Evaporator House/Alcohol Still House, Engine Room, and Boiler House are staggered down the hill towards the chimney, each constructed of English Bond red bricks. Although they are adjoined externally, they do not have an internal thoroughfare.

The interior of the two storey Evaporator House and Alcohol Still House has been refurbished for use as offices, with a mezzanine level at the eastern end of the first floor. The original timber roof trusses survive above the office cubicles, there are small vents two thirds up the walls at regular intervals, and the ends of metal bolts can also be seen, ground-off flush with the brickwork. There is an outside stairway to the mezzanine level on the east face of the building, and there is a concrete ramp to the first floor entrance near the western end. Dormer windows have been added to the corrugated iron roof above the mezzanine floor.

A modern kitchen extension, of Stretcher Bond brick, protrudes north from the mezzanine level of the Evaporator House, and a modern flat-roofed shed adjoins the north side of the Alcohol Still House. There is also a modern flat-roofed extension to the south of the Alcohol Still House, clad in metal sheeting. East of the Alcohol Still House is a small brick latrine, with bull nosed corners, that is now used for chemical storage.

The Engine Room is used as a cold store, and the Boiler House is used as a storeroom. A modern cold-store extension conceals most of the lower floor of the Engine Room and Boiler House on the eastern side. The chimney has a steel ring encircling its summit, and it has a steel door on its lower north side, which was opened by swinging it completely away along a steel track.

To the west of the internal road is the remaining floor of the Acidifier House, which appears to have been substantially modified, with modern cladding. To the north is the Engineers' Office and Fitters' shop, made with Stretcher Bond brick, of one-storey with a mezzanine floor. To its north is a skillion-roofed timber extension. Just to the east of the fitter's shop is the Winch House, also of Stretcher Bond brick. It is open on one side, and has an extended roof that serves as an entrance porch for the Fitters' shop.

Two one-story wooden barracks stand to the north of the Engineers' Office and Fitters' shop. Raised on timber stumps, each is clad in weatherboards, with a skillion roof of galvanised iron, and timber-lined eaves. Each has six doors on the southern side. The southernmost hut has six windows on the northern side, but the northernmost hut has a sliding steel door in place of one of its windows.

Any post 1970 structures and extensions on the site are not significant, nor are the post 1970 internal modifications to the factory buildings significant. The surviving ground floor of the Acidifier House is no longer significant.

== Heritage listing ==
The former Commonwealth Acetate of Lime Factory was listed on the Queensland Heritage Register on 7 December 2007 having satisfied the following criteria.

The place is important in demonstrating the evolution or pattern of Queensland's history.

The remaining buildings of the Commonwealth Acetate of Lime Factory at Colmslie, built between 1917 and 1920 as part of the defence-factory program of the Australian Commonwealth Arsenal, demonstrate Queensland's role in Australia's early defence industry: using the products of sugar cane to contribute to Australian self-sufficiency in ammunition manufacture. Between 1943 and 1948 the factory was part of a Royal Australian Navy Base, illustrating how Commonwealth properties could be adapted for military use in a crisis. The use of the factory buildings as a hostel for migrants between 1949 and 1963, and c.1965, demonstrates the process of adapting Commonwealth defence properties to temporarily house migrants from Britain and Europe during Australia's post-World War II period of mass immigration. In addition, the factory network of the Munitions Supply Board was related to a deliberate government effort to provide a scientific and technical knowledge base for Australian private industry.

The place demonstrates rare, uncommon or endangered aspects of Queensland's cultural heritage.

The Acetate of Lime Factory at Colmslie was the only Commonwealth Arsenal/Munitions Supply Board Factory built in Queensland prior to World War II, and was the only factory of its type in Australia. The two de-mountable timber huts on the site may be among the last remaining in-situ Queensland examples of the temporary accommodation provided on military properties for post-World War II migrants.

The place is important because of its aesthetic significance.

The Acetate of Lime Factory at Colmslie has fine industrial aesthetic qualities and its relationship with the river is also aesthetically significant. In particular the brick chimney is an important landmark in the industrial river-scape of the Brisbane River.

The place is important in demonstrating a high degree of creative or technical achievement at a particular period.

An innovative process for manufacturing Acetate of Lime from molasses was developed for the Australian Government by the noted bacteriologist and chemist Auguste de Bavay, and the Colmslie factory was built to his specifications.

The place has a special association with the life or work of a particular person, group or organisation of importance in Queensland's history.

The factory buildings have a strong association with the chemist Auguste de Bavay. The factory is also associated with a number of Commonwealth government and military organisations of importance, including the Commonwealth Arsenal, the Munitions Supply Board, the Royal Australian Navy, the Commonwealth Department of Labour and National Service, and the Commonwealth Department of Immigration.
