= Leioproctus litotes =

Scientific classification
- Kingdom: Animalia
- Phylum: Arthropoda
- Clade: Pancrustacea
- Class: Insecta
- Order: Hymenoptera
- Family: Colletidae
- Genus: Leioproctus
- Species: L. litotes

Binomial name
- Leioproctus litotes Maynard 2013

Species of bee

Leioproctus litotes, or Leioproctus (Leioproctus) litotes, is a species of bee in the family Colletidae and subfamily Colletinae. It is endemic to Australia. It was described by Australian entomologist Glynn Maynard in 2013.

== Etymology ==
The specific epithet litotes (Latin: "plain" or "simple") refers to its undistinguished appearance.

== Description ==
Male body length is about 6 mm. Integumental colouration is mainly brown. The hair is pale to dark brown.

== Distribution and habitat ==
The species occurs in the Wet Tropics of Far North Queensland. The type locality is Babinda.

== Behaviour ==
The adults are flying mellivores. Flowering plants visited by the bees include Eucalyptus species.
