= Wilfrid Simmonds =

Australian politician (1889–1967)

Wilfrid Simmonds MBE
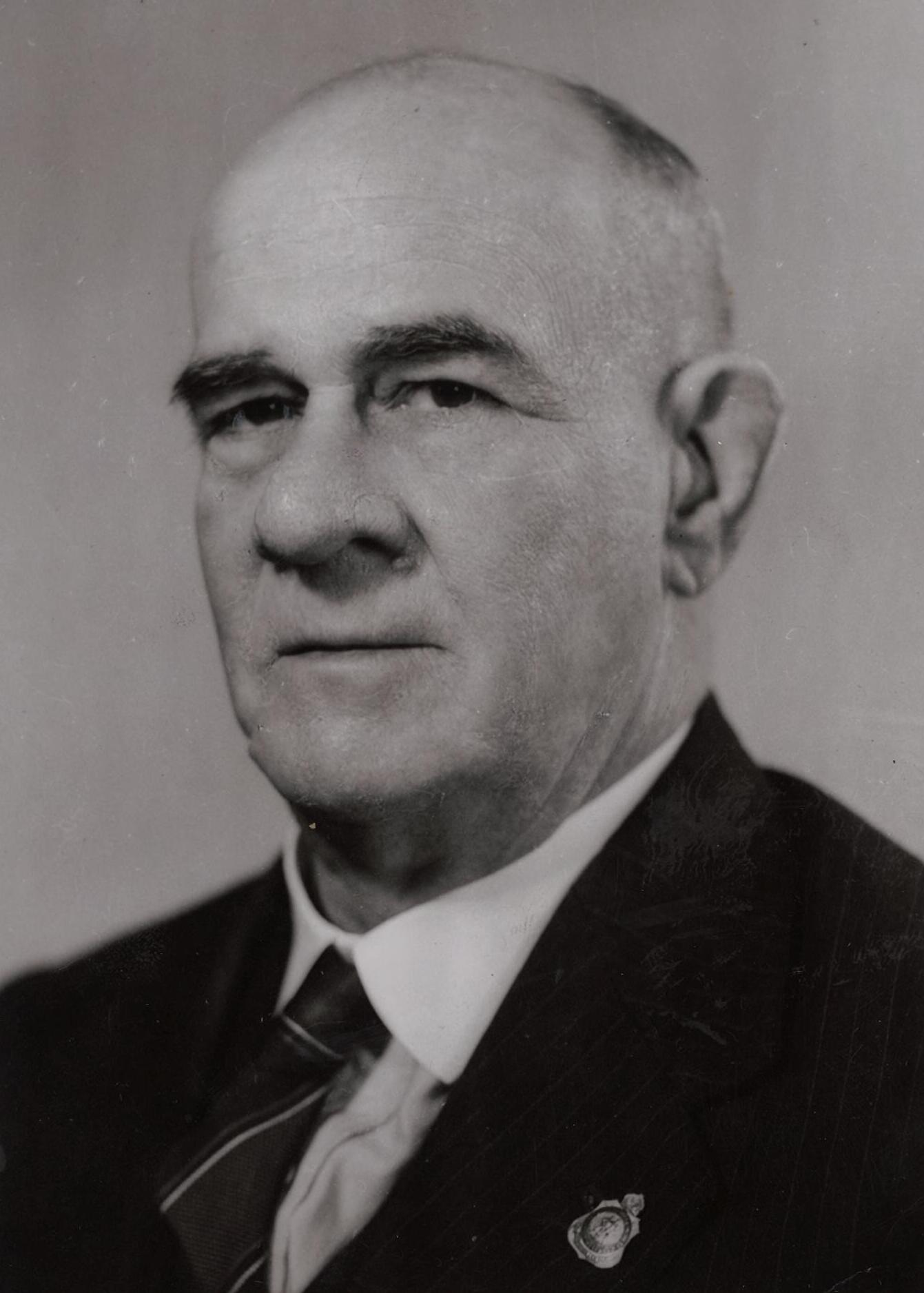

Senator for Queensland
- In office 22 February 1950 – 19 March 1951

Personal details
- Born: 19 December 1889 Cairns, Queensland, Australia
- Died: 2 January 1967 (aged 77) Babinda, Queensland, Australia
- Party: Country
- Spouse(s): Beatrice Moller (m. 1911; div. 1924) Ida Burnett (m. 1926)
- Occupation: Sugar-grower

Wilfrid Mylchreest Simmonds, MBE (19 December 1889 – 2 January 1967) was an Australian politician and sugar-grower. He was a Senator for Queensland from 1950 to 1951, representing the Country Party. He was a pioneer of the sugar industry around Babinda and was a long-serving member of the Mulgrave Shire Council and director of the Babinda Sugar Mill.

== Early life ==
Simmonds was born on 19 December 1889 in Cairns, Queensland. He was the son of Christina Annie (née Mylchreest) and Henry Simmonds. His father was "a sugar industry pioneer and first chairman of the Mulgrave Central Mill Company".

Simmonds attended state schools in Cairns and Nelson. He left school at the age of twelve following his father's death, with his family unable to support his further education and ambitions to study law. After briefly working as a typesetter at the Cairns Morning Post, Simmonds spent his teenage years in various labouring positions, including on dairy farms milking cows and delivering milk, as a musterer of sheep and cattle, and as a "hobble boy and skull-dragger" assisting a bullocky in the Gulf Country. He established his own butcher's shop at the age of 20.

In 1914, Simmonds purchased an old sugar plantation near Babinda. He was regarded as a pioneer of the local sugar industry and was a long-serving director of the Babinda Central Sugar Mill, including as chairman from 1936 to 1939, 1950 to 1953 and 1955 to 1957. Simmonds enlisted as a private in the Australian Imperial Force in August 1917. He served on the Western Front with the 15th Battalion and was wounded in action, being discharged from the AIF in September 1919. He was involved in recruitment campaigns during World War I and civil defence initiatives during World War II, being made a life member of the Returned Sailors' and Soldiers' Imperial League of Australia in 1950.

== Politics ==
Simmonds was a member of the Cairns Shire Council (renamed the Shire of Mulgrave in 1940) across six decades, serving from 1915 to 1917, 1920 to 1924, 1927 to 1936 and 1958 to 1964. He was chairman of the council from 1930 to 1936.

Simmonds was an unsuccessful Country Party candidate for the House of Representatives at the 1940 and 1943 federal elections, standing against the incumbent Australian Labor Party (ALP) member Bill Riordan in the safe Labor seat of Kennedy. He was associated with the Northern Country Party, the party's largely independent North Queensland division which occasionally disaffiliated from the Queensland Country Party, such as at the 1943 election.

At the 1949 election, Simmonds was elected to the Senate running for the Country Party on a joint Coalition ticket with the Liberal Party. As the election following an expansion of parliament, his term began on 22 February 1950 and was due to conclude on 30 June 1953. However, his term was cut short by a double dissolution on 19 March 1951 and he was not re-endorsed at the 1951 election. As the Coalition had seven incumbent senators and was only considered likely to win a maximum of six seats, it was determined that Simmonds would be dropped from the ticket as the most junior senator.

In the Senate, Simmonds was an advocate for North Queensland which he regarded as having been neglected. He was an "ardent" anti-socialist and spoke in favour of the Menzies government's Communist Party Dissolution Act 1950. He also supported "bipartisan political support for the decisions of arbitration bodies, financial assistance to enable European farmers to settle in Australia, and, in order to reverse the 'drift from the land', increased subsidies and improved amenities for country dwellers".

== Personal life ==
In 1911, Simmonds married Beatrice Moller, with whom he had one son. His wife was granted a divorce in 1924 on the grounds of "misconduct", after she employed a private detective who discovered Simmonds had been conducting an affair with a woman in Brisbane.

In 1926, Simmonds remarried to Ida Burnett, a nurse. He was appointed a Member of the British Empire (MBE) in 1961. He died at the Babinda District Hospital on 2 January 1967, having been predeceased by the only son of his second marriage.
