= Babinda Air Raid Shelter =

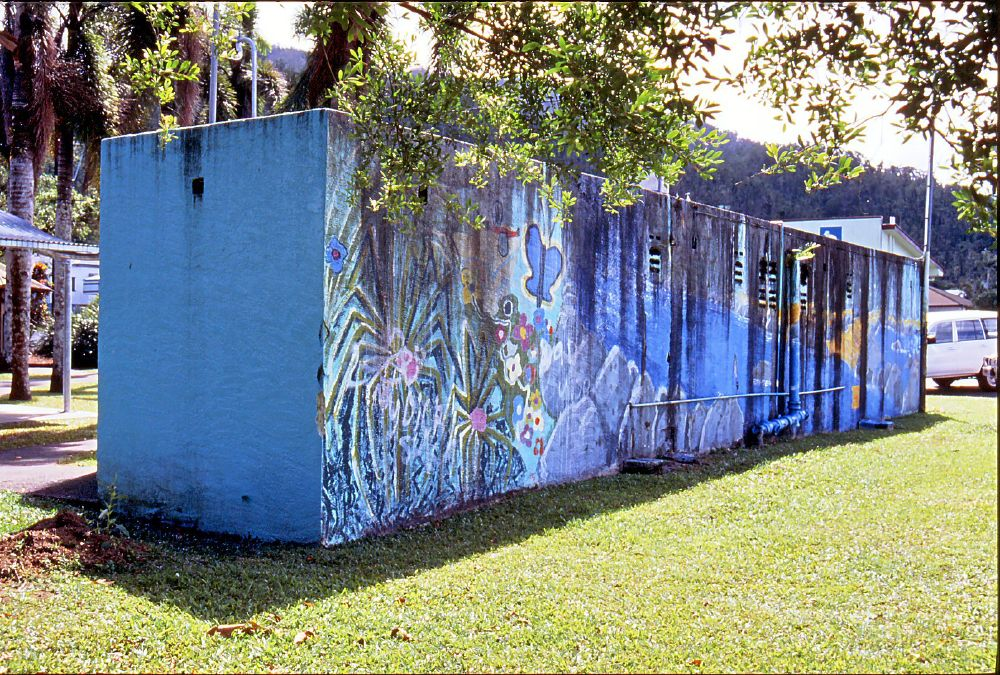
- Babinda Air Raid Shelter, from the East

- Location within Queensland Location within Australia
- 17.3441°S 145.9208°E
- Location: Public Toilets, 109 Munro Street, Babinda, Cairns Region, Queensland, Australia

History
- Design period: 1939–1945 (World War II)
- Built: 1942
- Built for: Mulgrave Shire Council

Site notes
- Architect: Department of Public Works (Queensland)

Queensland Heritage Register
- Official name: Babinda Air Raid Shelter, Babinda Public Toilet Block
- Type: state heritage (built)
- Designated: 16 April 2010
- Reference no.: 602743
- Significant period: 1942–1945
- Builders: Mulgrave Shire Council

Babinda Air Raid Shelter is a heritage-listed former air raid shelter and now public toilets at 109 Munro Street, Babinda, Cairns Region, Queensland, Australia. It was designed by Department of Public Works (Queensland) and built in 1942 by Mulgrave Shire Council. It is also known as Babinda Public Toilet Block. It was added to the Queensland Heritage Register on 16 April 2010.

== History ==
Babinda air raid shelter was one of 57 public air raid shelters constructed between Mackay and Cairns during early 1942. A Government Gazette notice issued two weeks after the Japanese surprise attack on Pearl Harbor in early December 1941, required Queensland local authorities to provide public air raid shelters. The air raid shelter at Babinda was built to a standard design with 300-millimetre (12 in) thick reinforced walls and provided seating for 50 people. As the threat of air attacks receded the building was turned into a public toilet and remains today for this purpose.

The township of Babinda was established about 1912 as a small settlement on the Mulgrave railway. Between 1914 and 1915 the population of the town rose rapidly due to the construction of the Babinda Central Sugar Mill. Government facilities were established to serve the local community including a post office, court house, police station and state school. The town continues to service the surrounding sugar-growing industry and its economy is heavily reliant on the Babinda Sugar Mill, which dominates the entrance to the town. Until 1995 Babinda was administered by the Mulgrave Shire Council, before amalgamation with Cairns City Council. The town is now included within the Cairns Regional Council boundaries.

Until 1927 the land that is now occupied by Anzac Park was the Babinda sports ground. The land was later subdivided and partly sold off and the remaining property retained as public parkland. A war memorial to honour those from the district who served in World War I (1914–1918) was originally erected in Munro Street nearer the centre of the town. The memorial was moved to the park in the 1930s, when it is believed that the area was named Anzac Park.

With the declaration of war in September 1939, the Queensland Premier's Department, as the agency responsible for co-ordinating civil defence works in the state, began implementing home security policies outlined in the Commonwealth War Book. Air Raid Protection Committees were formed along the Queensland coast. These committees usually consisted of the local mayor, inspector of police and government medical officer. Air raid precautions were organised and all schools in North Queensland were required to provide slit trenches for pupils. As the threat of war with Japan increased, construction of public air raid shelters was planned in main centres considered vulnerable to air attack. The Queensland government undertook to finance the shelters on behalf of the local authorities with the adjustment of costs deferred. Special legislation was passed enabling local authorities to obtain loans from the state government for the purpose of air raid shelter construction and to levy special rates to meet interest repayments.

On 7 December 1941 Japanese aircraft struck the US naval base at Pearl Harbor in the Hawaiian Islands. At the same time Japanese forces launched assaults on Thailand, the Philippines and the British colony of Malaya. Three days after Pearl Harbor, two capital ships of the Royal Navy were sunk off the coast of Malaya. This gave the Japanese almost total control of the seas to Australia's north. The sudden fall of Singapore on 15 February 1942 and the rapid, unchecked Japanese advance through the islands of the Netherlands East Indies raised fears of air attacks on Australia. The outlook during the first six months in 1942 looked very grim and the possibility of Japanese air raids and invasion was considered likely.

The Public Works Department was responsible for the enforcement of orders issued under the National Security (General) Regulations, relating to the provision of air raid shelters for the protection of the public. Local authorities were responsible for the construction of public air raid shelters, as well as for enforcing orders relating to the provision of shelters by building owners. Hotels, flats and boarding houses occupied by 15 or more people, or buildings in which 30 or more worked, were required to provide air raid shelters for those people. Local authorities were responsible for the construction of public air raid shelters and in the event that this was not possible the Public Works Department would supply the men and materials required. However, in most circumstances the local authority carried out the works. A list of public air raid shelters required for construction by local governments was published in the Government Gazette on 23 December 1941.

The Babinda public air raid shelter was ordered for construction by the Public Works Department on 16 January 1942. It was the only public air raid shelter ordered for the town. Other public air raid shelters ordered to be constructed in neighbouring towns in far-north Queensland in January 1942 were: Cairns (9), Innisfail (3), Gordonvale (2) and Atherton (1).

The Babinda shelter was constructed by Mulgrave Shire Council during 1942 to the same standard design as the public air raid shelters constructed in Cairns, for which drawings have been located. Public shelters at Cairns, Babinda and other centres in north Queensland were designed to accommodate 50 persons seated. They were above-ground structures with 300-millimetre (12 in) reinforced concrete walls and 150-millimetre (5.9 in) thick roof. Where there was the possibility of debris falling on top of the shelter the thickness of the roofs was increased to 300 millimetres (12 in). The shelters contained an open entrance at either end protected by an internal blast wall. A small room at each entrance, referred to on a drawing of Cairns Air Raid Shelter as a closet, may have contained male and female toilets (water closets). The interior comprised one large room with a timber bench along the western wall between the two internal blast walls, which could accommodate up to 20 persons seated; and a long, double timber bench positioned north-south in the centre of the room, which could accommodate a total of 30 persons seated. An alcove for a lamp was provided at the end of each blast wall. Eighteen offset open air vents around the building provided ventilation while protecting the occupants against direct blast from a near miss.

As the threat from air attacks lessened, the shelter was turned into a public toilet by Mulgrave Shire Council during 1944–1945 and remains today for this purpose. The building was last used as a public shelter during Tropical Cyclone Larry which passed through Babinda on 20 March 2006 causing severe damage in the town. The building remains effective as a cyclone shelter for public use.

== Description ==
The former air raid shelter is located in Anzac Park, Munro Street, Babinda, where it remains accessible to the public.

It is an above ground reinforced concrete structure with 300-millimetre (12 in) thick walls and a 150-millimetre (5.9 in) thick roof. It has entrances at both the northern and southern ends. In form, the exterior of the structure has changed little from its original design. The 1992 mural on the exterior walls is not considered to be of State cultural heritage significance.

The structure retains the internal blast walls that were provided just inside the entrances, and next to each entrance a closet, although these are no longer in use and have been sealed.

The interior has been converted into female and male toilets, with a dividing concrete wall erected through the centre of the structure. Apart from the addition of fixtures for water, power and lighting the only other apparent changes have been alteration to the offset ventilation vents to a more open style.

== Heritage listing ==
Babinda Air Raid Shelter was listed on the Queensland Heritage Register on 16 April 2010 having satisfied the following criteria.

The place is important in demonstrating the evolution or pattern of Queensland's history.

Babinda Air Raid Shelter is important in demonstrating the urgent measures taken by State and local authorities for protection of the public from attack by hostile forces during a time of war, and is a reminder of how close World War II came to Queensland and in particular the State's northern regions.

The place demonstrates rare, uncommon or endangered aspects of Queensland's cultural heritage.

The Babinda Shelter is the most intact example of a public air raid shelter in north Queensland and demonstrates now rare and uncommon evidence of the civil defence role in the Babinda and the Cairns area during World War II.

It is the only known public air raid shelter in north Queensland with intact internal blast walls within each entrance.

The place is important in demonstrating the principal characteristics of a particular class of cultural places.

Babinda Air Raid Shelter demonstrates the principal characteristics of a World War II Air Raid Shelter built for public safety. The extant features demonstrate the design, construction and dimensions of a public air raid shelter of the World War II period. Surviving characteristics include: the reinforced concrete floor, walls and roof; internal blast walls; the wartime closet cubicles (now sealed); and the public park location.
