= Babinda State Hotel =

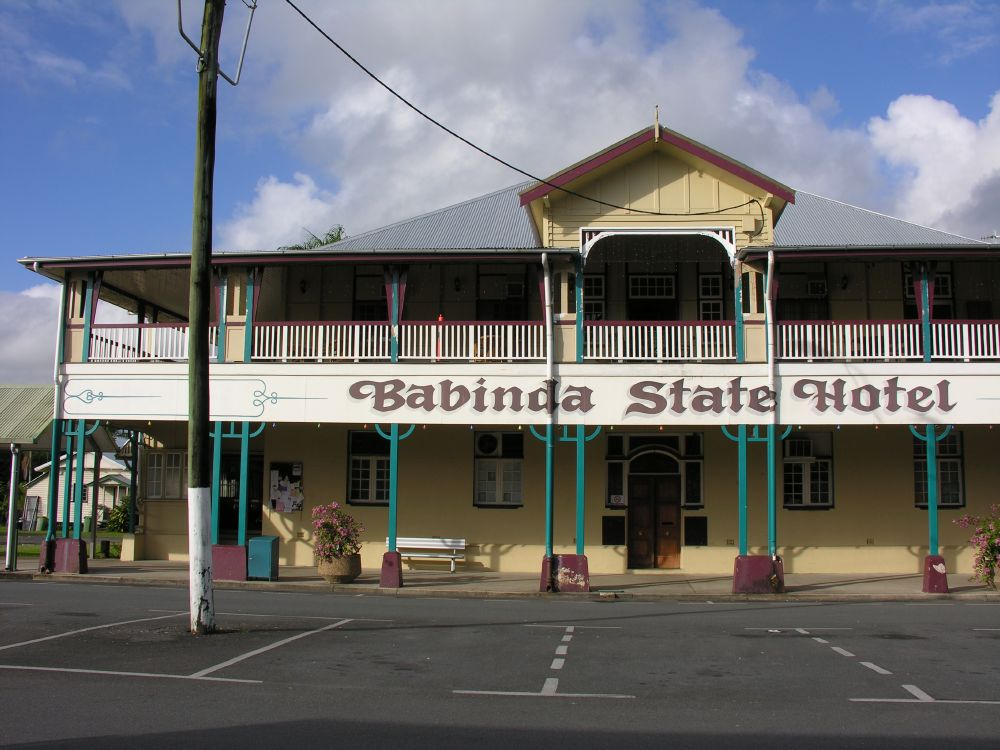
- Babinda State Hotel, 2009

- Location within Queensland Location within Australia
- 17.3446°S 145.9225°E
- Location: 65–85 Munro Street, Babinda, Cairns Region, Queensland, Australia

History
- Design period: 1914–1919 (World War I)
- Built: 1916–1917

Site notes
- Architect: Department of Public Works (Queensland)

Queensland Heritage Register
- Official name: Babinda Hotel
- Type: state heritage (built)
- Designated: 22 February 2002
- Reference no.: 602189
- Significant period: 1910s (fabric); 1910s–1930s (historical)
- Significant components: cellar
- Builders: Day labour

Babinda State Hotel is a heritage-listed hotel at 65–85 Munro Street, Babinda, Cairns Region, Queensland, Australia. It was designed by the Department of Public Works and built from 1916 to 1917 by day labour. It is also known as Babinda Hotel. It was added to the Queensland Heritage Register on 22 February 2002.

== History ==
The Queensland Government constructed the Babinda State Hotel in the town of Babinda between 1916 and 1917. It was the only hotel at the time constructed and operated by the Queensland Government under the Labor government's State Enterprises scheme.

The town of Babinda was first established in c. 1912. The township's first entry in Pugh's Almanac describes Babinda as a small township of 100 people on Mulgrave Railway, in a district mainly devoted to sugar-growing, distant 30 miles (48 km) from Cairns. Between 1914 and 1915 the population of Babinda rose rapidly due to the construction of the Babinda Central Sugar Mill. The town was surveyed for future development in 1915, and private owners bought allotments and began to build homes and businesses. Gradually government facilities were established to serve the local community including a post office, courthouse, police station and state school.

From 1915 the Labor Government, led by T. J. Ryan and encouraged by wartime restrictions, food shortages and the consequent high prices, established a series of state-run businesses to compete with private sector business. The idea of state enterprises was not new. During the 19th century governments had operated railways and post offices as monopolies, but the general public accepted these as legitimate areas of government. The new state enterprises were distinctly different and designed to directly compete with private enterprise in order to provide the basic necessities at reasonable prices. The first foray into state enterprises was the establishment of the state butchers shops in 1915. This was followed by the establishment of state pastoral stations, fish supply shops, saw mills, produce agencies, cold stores and mines. Despite the good intentions of the government, the state enterprises lost money except for their one success story, the State Hotel at Babinda.

The construction of a State Hotel at Babinda was linked to the repercussions of the Sugar Works Act 1911. Under this act the sale of intoxicating liquor was prohibited in sugar growing areas and the two existing hotel licences in the town were revoked and the owners compensated. This left the town with a definite lack of accommodation in the area and it was suggested that the lack of quality accommodation in the town would discourage "the better class of labour" from seeking employment at the sugar refinery. To address this problem the Queensland Government built the first and only state owned and run hotel in Queensland. As it was run by the government, the hotel was also permitted to sell alcohol.

Designed by architects in the Department of Public Works and built by day labour, the hotel opened its doors to guests in May 1917. The hotel was a two storied modern structure of concrete and wood with a corrugated iron roof. It had 58 bedrooms, 24 in the First Class Section and 34 in the Second Class Section, and was "splendidly furnished throughout", with reputedly one of the largest bars of any hotel in Queensland. The new State Hotel was designed as a showpiece, and was to be the social centre of Babinda, as well as a major physical landmark in the town. It was the entertainment venue for important visitors and Prime Ministers Billy Hughes and Stanley Bruce were both greeted at civic receptions in the hotel.

Initially the hotel was operated by the Home Department and with a Manager appointed and paid by the department. Following the passing of the State Enterprises Act 1918 the management of the hotel was transferred to State Enterprises, which were administered by the State Trade Office - a part of the Department of Labour and Industry.

Unlike nearly all other state enterprises, the State Hotel actually made money. In 1929 its turnover in the bar was more than £300 a week and that of the house was almost £200 a week. However, with the onset of the economic depression from 1929 and the massive losses other state enterprises were experiencing, the newly elected Country Party Government (Moore Ministry) in Queensland was intent on selling off all state enterprises.

Sale of the hotel was announced in Queensland Parliament in September 1929 with the reading of a special bill for the Babinda State Hotel Sale Act 1929. To entice buyers the government offered a monopoly on hotel trade in the town at least until 1935. It was also a condition of the sale that the purchaser make an application to the licensing court for the deletion of the word "State" from the name of the hotel. Babinda residents opposed the decision to sell the hotel and urged the government to grant additional liquor licences in the area. The Labor party also expressed concern that a syndicate of Italians might buy the hotel, with the leader of the ALP William Forgan Smith suggesting that action had to be taken to safeguard the rights of Britishers. Despite this opposition the sale of the hotel went ahead as planned.

Consisting of two storey hotel buildings, including accommodation wings and staff quarters, modern furnishings, plant equipment, sample rooms, shop front and garage, the property was put to auction in March 1930. Only four bids were received for the hotel, the highest bid coming from a Mr J. A. O'Hagan of Brisbane. John O'Hagan, licensed victualler and former licensee of Lennons Hotel and the Hotel Daniel, continued his negotiations with the Government and eventually bought the hotel for £50,000, payable in instalments without interest. Upon the sale the hotel was renamed the Babinda Hotel.

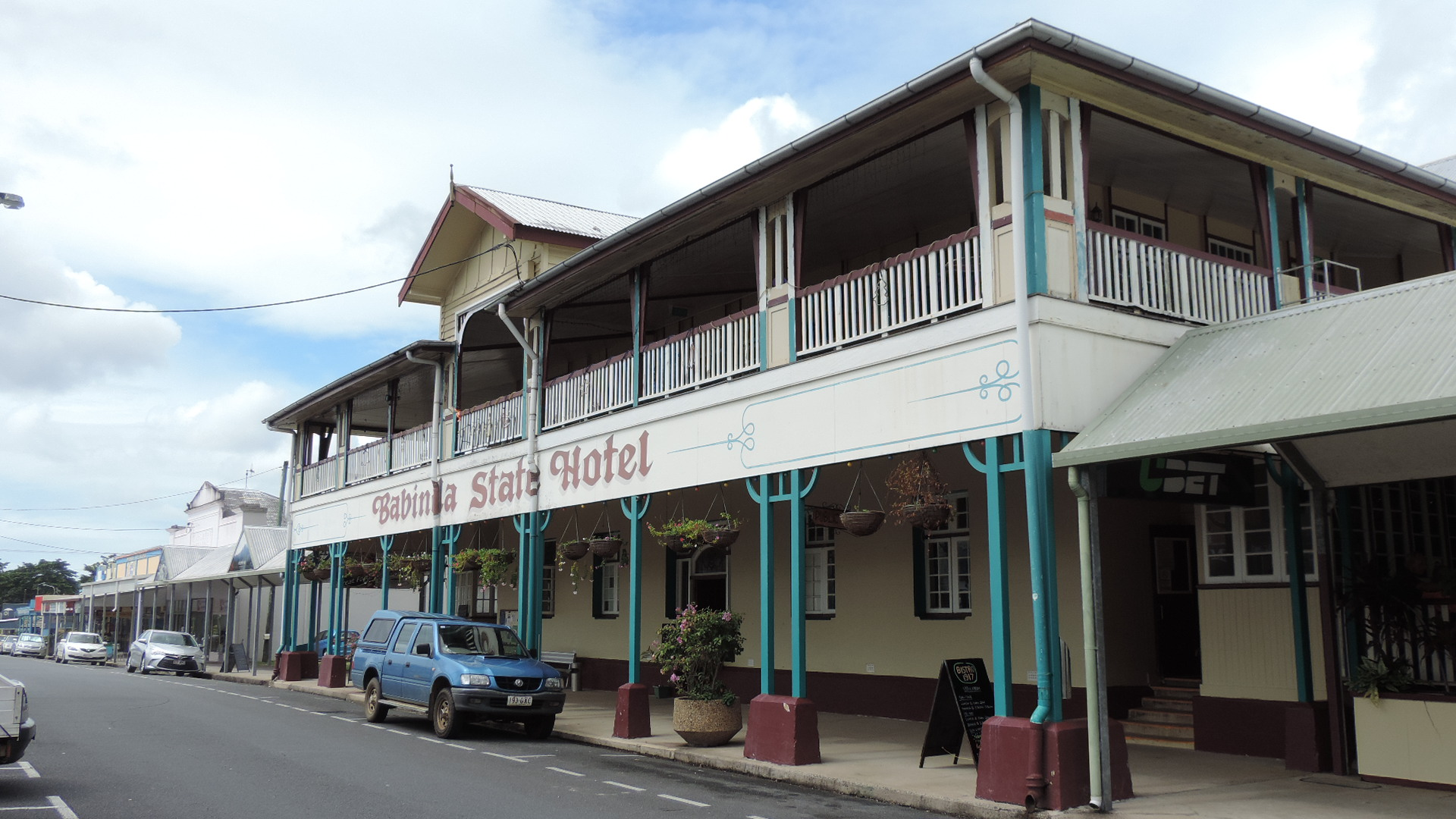
Babinda State Hotel, still dominant in Munro Street, Babinda, 2018

O'Hagan continued the grand tradition of the hotel up until the Second World War, when business declined and he sold the hotel in 1941. Since that period the hotel has had a succession of owners but has continued to operate as a hotel with accommodation facilities. The hotel has undergone few alterations over the years with the exception of the removal of the second-class accommodation wing and other outbuildings in 1970. It still remains the only hotel in the town of Babinda and dominates the commercial centre of Babinda.

== Description ==
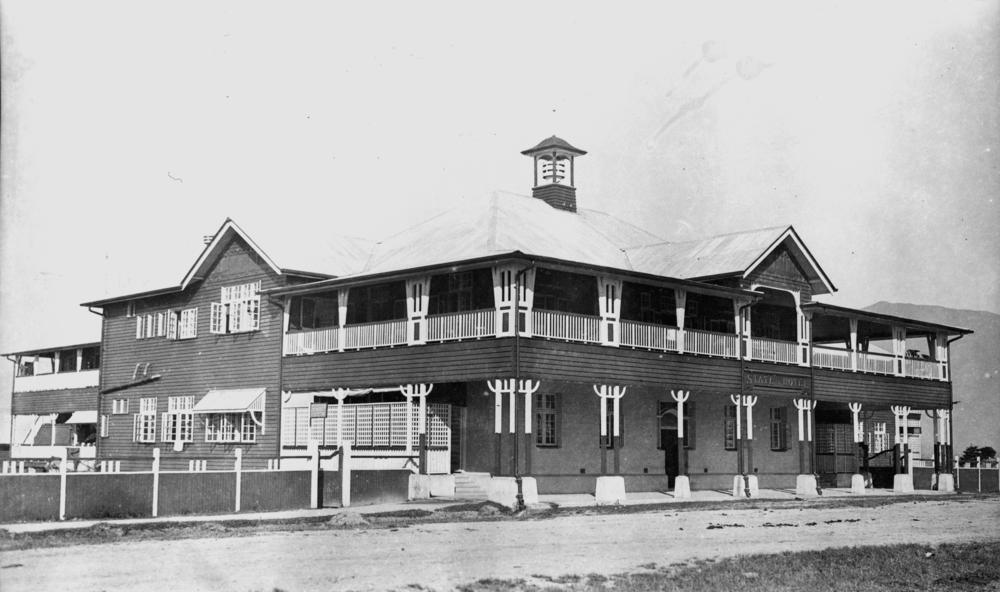
State Hotel, Babinda, circa 1924

The Babinda Hotel is located on Munro Street, Babinda and occupies a prominent position in the town's main street.

The hotel is a two-storey building, constructed of timber and roofed with corrugated iron sheeting. The front facade of the building features open verandahs with a series of single and double timber posts.

A gabled pediment in the centre of the building with a timber infill defines the entrance to the hotel. Twin timber doors, surrounded by leadlight windows inscribed with the BSH insignia, provide access to the hotel. On either side of the entrance are a number of casement windows.

The ground floor of the hotel consists of two bars (main bar and western bar), dining room, kitchen, gambling room, games room, gym, cellar/storeroom and private office. The second floor consists of a public accommodation wing that opens onto a wide verandah overlooking Munro Street as well as a private residence and an internal verandah that overlooks the games room.

The accommodation wing on the second floor features a number of ornate timber archways in the hallway and double French doors that open onto the verandah.

The main bar on the ground floor features steel beams that run across the ceiling that once transported kegs from the storeroom to the bar. The western bar (originally the private bar) features a silky oak archway and balustrade that defines the entrance of the bar and servery. The lower part of the walls of the main entrance and western bar are also silky oak.

To the rear of the hotel there is a concrete slab that defines the old stable floors.

The ornate roof ventilator was removed in the 1980s.

== Heritage listing ==
Babinda Hotel was listed on the Queensland Heritage Register on 22 February 2002 having satisfied the following criteria.

The place is important in demonstrating the evolution or pattern of Queensland's history.

The Babinda Hotel, formerly known as the Babinda State Hotel, was erected in the town of Babinda in 1917 and demonstrates important aspects of Queensland's political and economic history of the early twentieth century. As an early building in the town of Babinda, the hotel also provides evidence of the history of Babinda as a sugar growing settlement in far north Queensland. The hotel provides physical evidence of a period in the history of the state of Queensland, which saw the Labor government establish a series of state-run businesses to compete with private enterprise.

The place demonstrates rare, uncommon or endangered aspects of Queensland's cultural heritage.

The State Hotel was the only hotel constructed and operated by the Queensland Government (one of only two known "state" hotels in the country) as part of the Labor government's State Enterprises Scheme, which ran from 1915 until 1929.

The place is important in demonstrating the principal characteristics of a particular class of cultural places.

The form of the State Hotel, and the facilities provided, demonstrate the characteristics of a country hotel from the early twentieth century.
