= Auguste de Bavay =

Auguste Joseph François de Bavay (9 June 1856 – 16 November 1944) was a brewer and industrial chemist in Australia.

== History ==
De Bavay was born in Vilvoorde, Belgium, second son of R. de Bavay, Knight of the Order of Leopold / a son of Xavier de Bavay and his wife Marie Thérèse de Bavay née de Bontridder. He was educated at a college in Namur, and graduated in 1873 qualified as a surveyor. He undertook further studies at Gembloux, and found employment as a brewer and chemist. In the late 1870s he left for Ceylon (present-day Sri Lanka), where he worked as a plantation manager.

In March 1884 De Bavay arrived in Melbourne and worked as a brewer at Thomas Aitken's Victoria Parade Brewery. Following E. C. Hansen's discovery of the impact of yeast variety on the beer quality, De Bavay grew Australia's first pure yeast expressly cultured for top-fermentation brewing. His students included Jack Breheny.

In 1894 De Bavay joined the Foster's Group following a recommendation by Montague Cohen, a director of the company, and made improvements to their lager production. He then joined Cohen in wine production, establishing a vineyard at Woori Yallock in partnership with Cohen. He also acted as a consultant to Perth's Swan Brewery and Hobart's Cascade Brewery and, later, Carlton & United Breweries, in all of which Cohen and Baillieu had an interest.

In 1889 he proved that Melbourne's water supply was potentially being contaminated by sewage via fireplugs. This led to a State Royal Commission, resulting in removal of the devices and an immediate improvement in quality of the water supply.

Auguste de Bavay, in old age

De Bavay was attracted to the "sulphide problem" of Broken Hill, where great mounds of potentially valuable zinc blende had accumulated, but could not be shipped economically because of the gangue content. If an economical method of separating the ore were developed, a great new industry would be created. C. V. Potter and Guillaume Delprat had made useful work on development of froth flotation . By July 1904 de Bavey had evolved his own process, skin or film flotation.

In 1904 he founded de Bavay's Sulphide Process Co. Ltd, with Cohen and William Baillieu, and the following year another company De Bavay's Sulphide Process Co. Ltd to purchase De Bavay's patents.

In 1909, Amalgamated Zinc (De Bavay's) Ltd was founded to put the process into practice. A mill and treatment plant were built on the North Broken Hill lease, near the old Victoria Cross mine shaft, and it treated ore from the North Mine, using the de Bavay process. In 1917, North Broken Hill commissioned its own mill and treatment plant, using the Minerals Separation 'froth flotation' process. Without a source of material to treat, the Amalgamated Zinc plant ceased operation in April 1917.

After Australia entered the Great War in 1914, De Bavay was approached by the Minister for Defence, George Pearce, to develop a process for production of acetone, needed for manufacture of cordite. Within two weeks he had developed a process based on the fermentation and distillation of molasses. He made a gift of the patent to the Commonwealth of Australia. De Bavay was put in charge of development and erection of the Government's Commonwealth Acetate of Lime Factory.

De Bavay was naturalized in November 1902. He died at his home on Studley Park Road, Kew, Victoria aged 88. His remains were buried in Melbourne General Cemetery.

== Recognition ==
- De Bavay was appointed O.B.E. in 1920
- He was appointed Consul for Guatemala in 1906
- He received the Papal decoration Pro Ecclesia et Pontifice

He was invested in two Belgian orders:
- Chevalier of the Ordre de Léopold in 1902
- Officer of the Ordre de la Couronne in 1920
- Commander of the Ordre de la Couronne in 1928

== Family ==
De Bavay married Anna Heinzle (died 27 October 1933) at St Patrick's Cathedral, Melbourne on 21 March 1885. Their family included:

- Marie de Bavay (16 June 1886 – ) never married
- Captain (Auguste John) Charles de Bavay (12 May 1887 – ) married Vera Tolley (1896– ) on 20 August 1919. He was brewer with Carlton Brewery, she was member of Tolley family, winemakers of South Australia
- Vera de Bavay (19 February 1890 – ) married John Higgs on ?? 1833, lived in Surrey, England
- (Francis) Xavier de Bavay (8 September 1895 – 23 February 1955) married Dulcie Lucille Cooper ( – ) on 19 June 1922. He was manager of the Cascade Brewerv Co. Ltd, Hobart
