= Devil's Pool =

Notorious water feature in Queensland Australia

Coordinates: 17.34333°S 145.87157°E

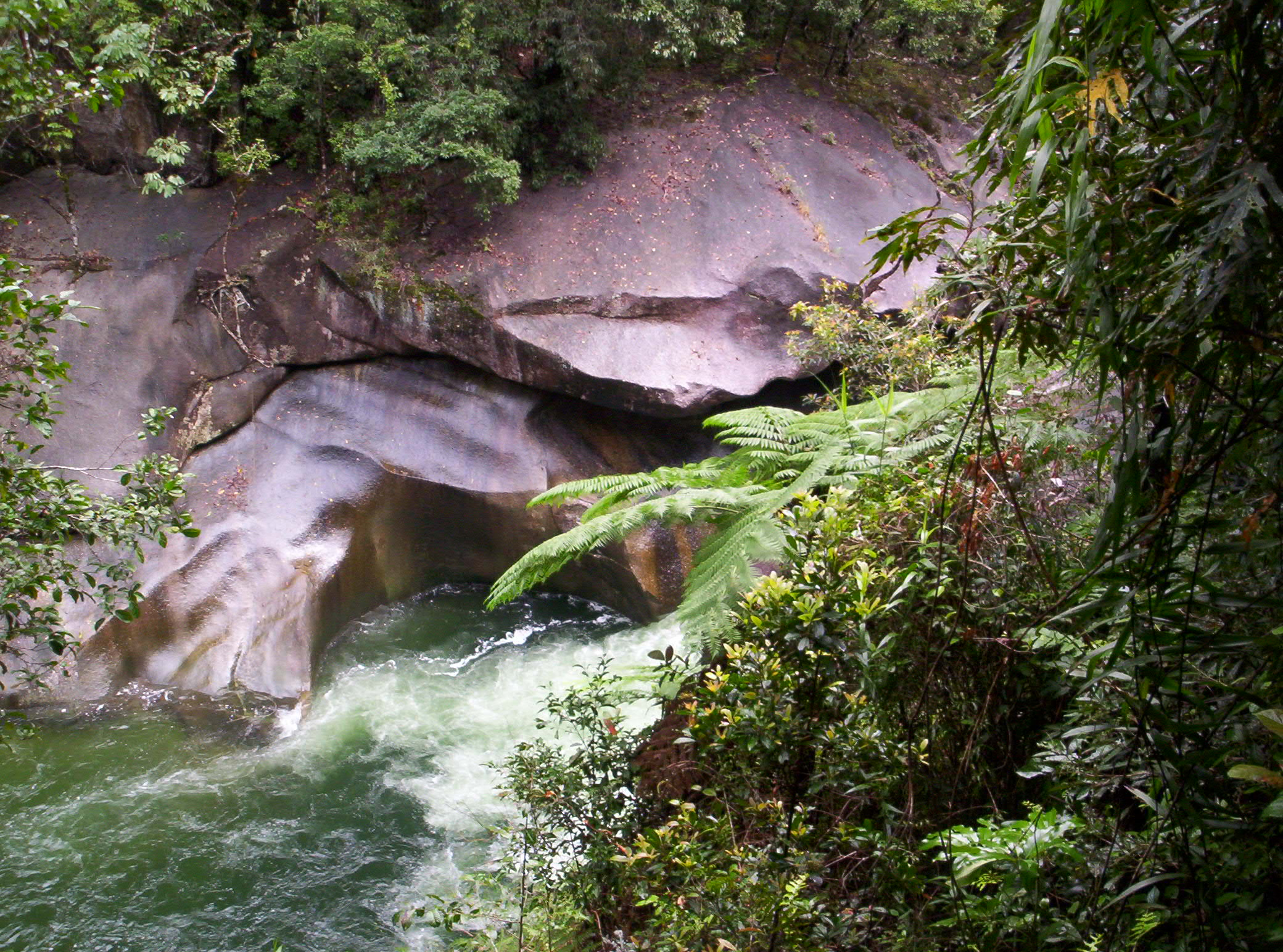
Devil's Pool as seen from its lookout

Devil's Pool is a natural pool in a treacherous stretch of Babinda Creek where large granite boulders fill the creek bed. It is one of the main attractions of the Babinda Boulders scenic reserve, near Babinda, Queensland, Australia.

Between 1959 and July 2023, 21 people have drowned at or near the pools. The local council urges visitors to stay within a designated swimming area and on paths out of cultural respect and to avoid loss of life.

== Drownings ==
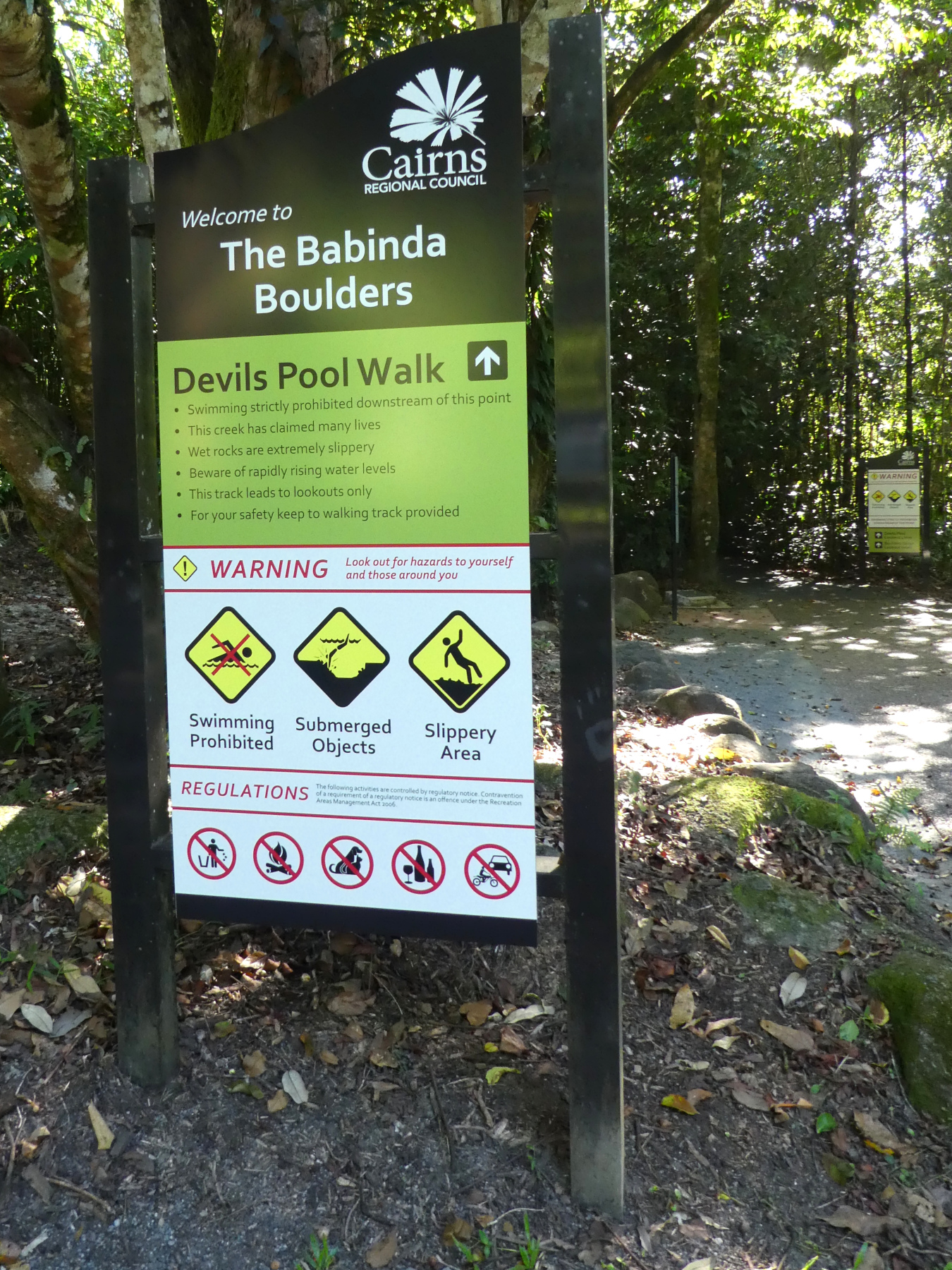
A warning sign at Babinda Boulders

Signs warn of the dangers of swimming and climbing in the No Go Zone because the water is deep and fast flowing through narrow channels and over underwater rocks. Deaths occur by swimming at the site, others by falling in unexpectedly, with many drowning victims being wedged in an underwater rock "chute". The force of the moving water is too strong for people to swim against, pinning them underwater, and drowning them.

In 2010, the Cairns Regional Council produced a report which was cited by the coroner examining the death of a man in that year at the Devil's Pool, stating that the number of deaths there totalled 17. In October 2020, the Australian Broadcasting Corporation reported that the number of known drownings at this site in the past 50 years stood at 20.

== Indigenous legend ==
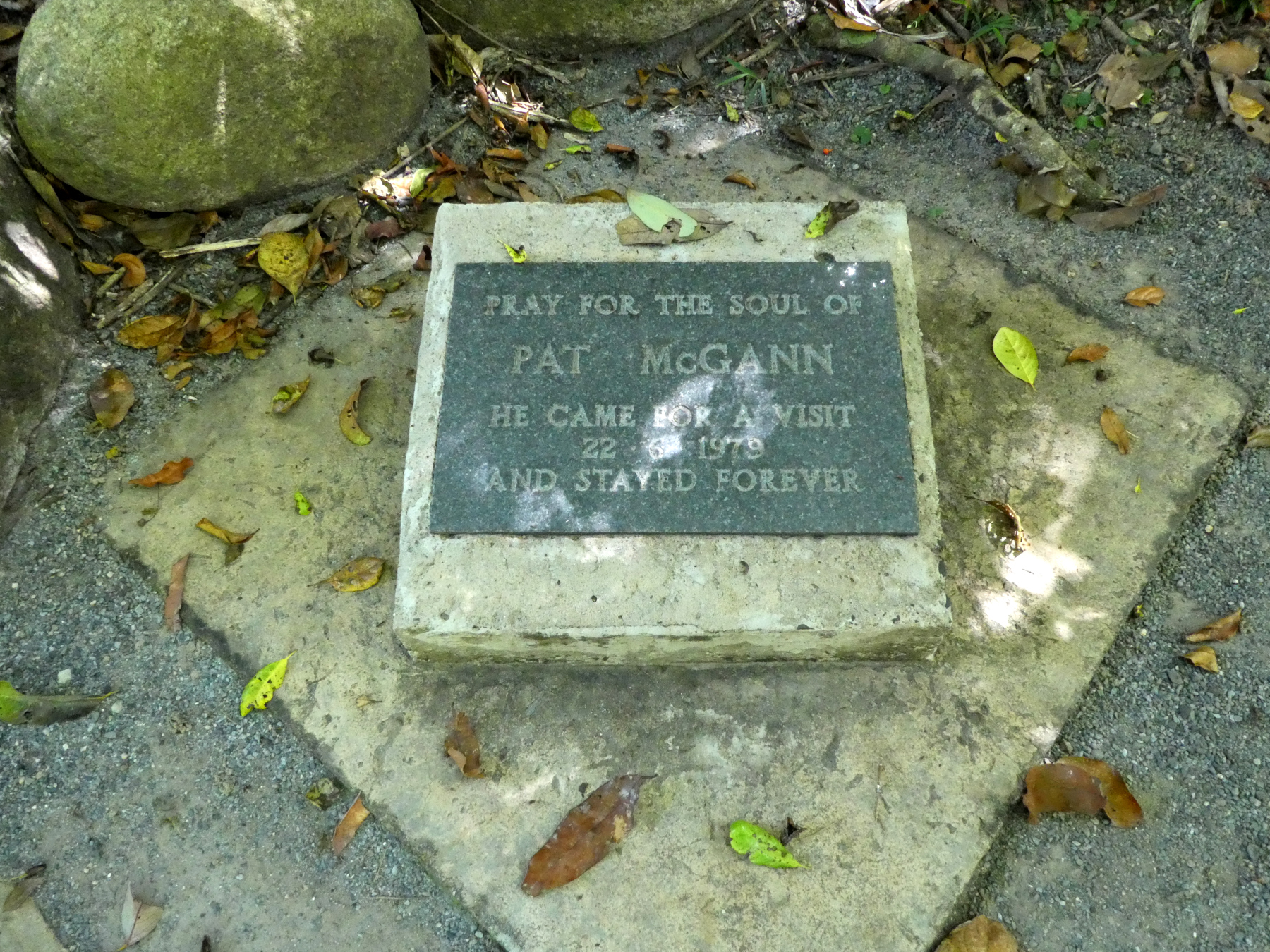
A memorial at Babinda Boulders

In 2005, the Australia TV program Message Stick gave an account of the Pool through many interviews and testimonies of witnesses to investigate the prevalence of deaths of young male travellers over the years. The Devil's Pool is the site of the local indigenous tribe's legend, which states how the Babinda Boulders were formed.

The tale is about Oolana, a young woman from the Yindinji Tribe. After being promised to a respected tribal elder, she met a handsome young warrior called Dyga from another tribe and fell in love. They fled their tribes and escaped into the wilderness to continue their affair. Elders searched for them and they were captured. Dyga was dragged away. Oolana escaped and was in despair. She threw herself into the Devil's Pools and her anguished cries turned into the pools torrents.

The Yidinji people believe that Oolana's spirit still haunts the Devils Pools, pulling young men to their untimely deaths.
