= Acid egg =

Device with no moving parts

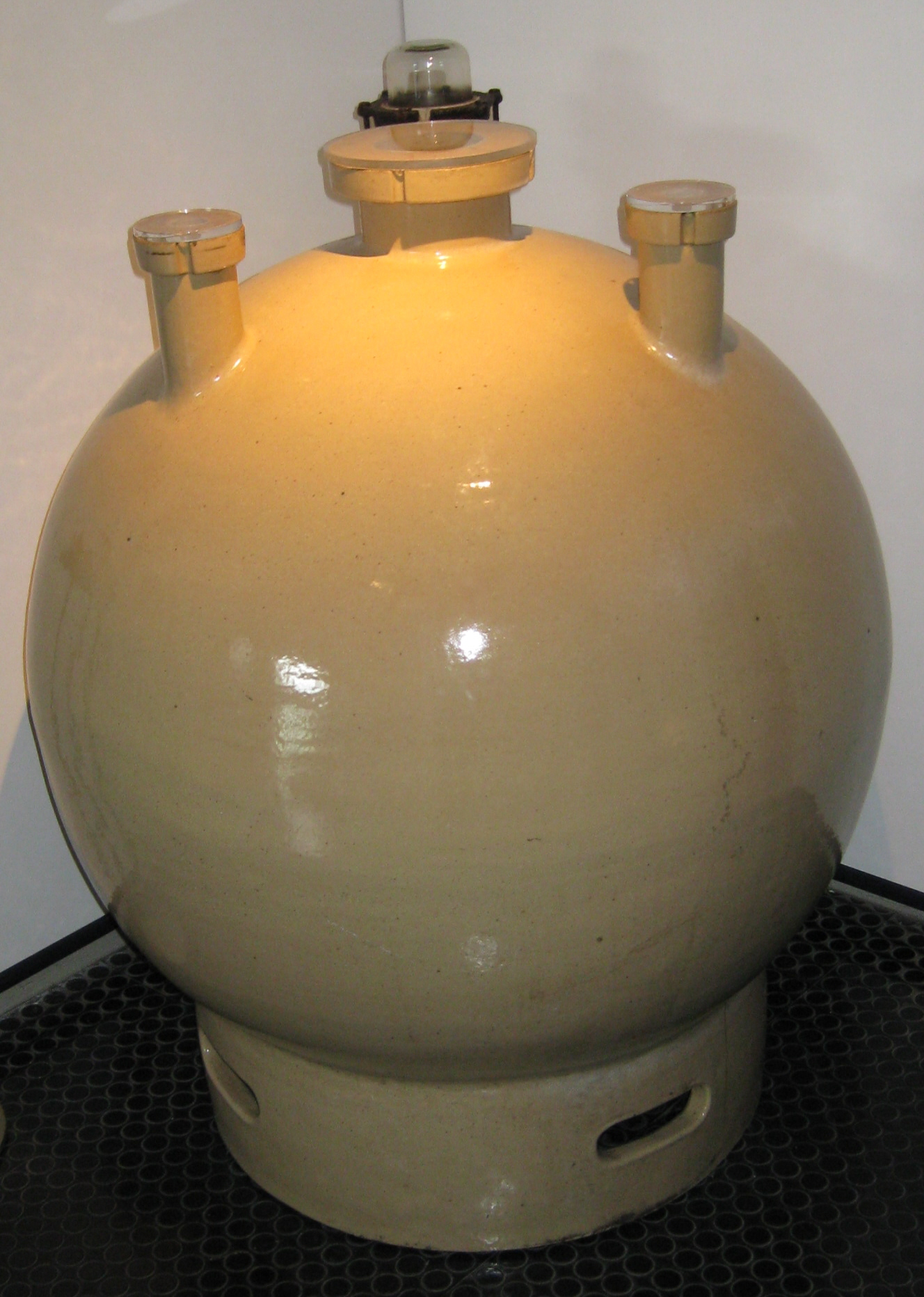
Acid Egg on display at the Catalyst Museum, 2011

The terms acid egg and montejus (or monte-jus) are sometimes used interchangeably to refer to a device with no moving parts formerly used instead of a pump in order to transfer difficult liquids. The principle is that a strong vessel containing the liquid is pressurized with gas or steam, forcing the liquid into a pipe (usually vertical upwards) thereby causing flow. When the liquid has been transferred, the pressure is released and more liquid is put in via gravity. It is thus cyclic in operation. The same principle has been used to lift water and called an air displacement pump or intermittent gas-lift pump, and has been applied to pumping oil up from the formation. Its use has largely been superseded by modern pumps, but it is still used sometimes for special tasks.

== Acid Egg ==
This was specifically devised to deal with the highly corrosive sulfuric acid, but was extended to other corrosive substances. It was traditionally made of ceramic (to be corrosion resistant) and spherical in shape (to withstand the pressure) thus giving its name. A cylindrical version (with hemispherical ends) was described by Swindin, being 3 feet in diameter and 6 feet long, holding 40 cubic feet of acid. In principle, the vessel is part filled with liquid, which is then expelled by pumping in compressed air. The liquid outlet is via a pipe from the top going down almost to the bottom of the vessel. When the acid egg is emptied, connections to the compressor and the delivery pipe are closed by valves, the air pressure is vented and the vessel refilled with acid. The cycle can then start again.

== Montejus ==
A French invention used in sugar production to move the partially processed sugar liquid up a pipe to the next stage of purification. Hence the name “monte-jus” or “raise juice”. Unlike the acid egg, it traditionally consists of a vertical cylindrical vessel made of steel, with a pipe from the bottom turned upwards, and it is pressurized by steam.
