= Babinda =

- Town
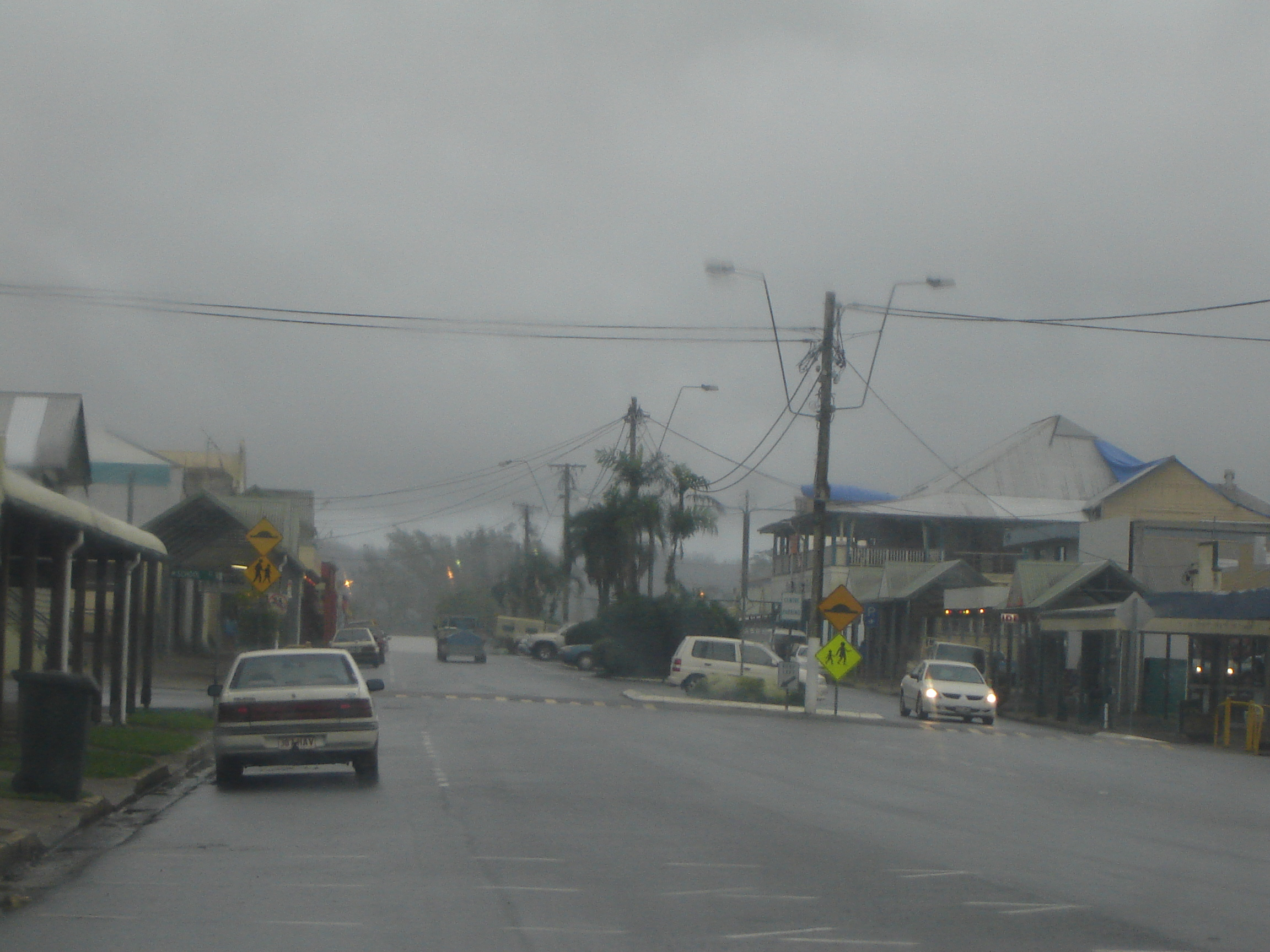
- Babinda on a typical rainy day

- Interactive map of Babinda
- Coordinates: 17.34389°S 145.9214°E
- Country: Australia
- State: Queensland
- City: Cairns
- LGA: Cairns Region
- Location: 29.6 km (18.4 mi) NNW of Innisfail, Queensland; 36.2 km (22.5 mi) SE of Gordonvale; 59.1 km (36.7 mi) S of Cairns; 1,625 km (1,010 mi) NNW of Brisbane
- Established: circa 1880 - circa 1900

Government
  - State electorate: Hill
  - Federal division: Kennedy

Area
  - Total: 39.9 km^{2} (15.4 sq mi)
- Elevation: 18.3 m (60 ft)

Population
  - Total: 1,287 (2021 census)
  - Density: 32.26/km^{2} (83.54/sq mi)
- Time zone: UTC+10:00 (AEST)
- Postcode: 4861
- Mean max temp: 27.66 °C (81.79 °F)
- Mean min temp: 19.92 °C (67.86 °F)
- Annual rainfall: 4,279.4 mm (168.48 in)
Localities around Babinda
Wooroonooran	Bellenden Ker	East Russell
Wooroonooran	Babinda	East Russell
Mirriwinni	Mirriwinni	Eubenangee

Babinda is a rural town and locality in the Cairns Region, Queensland, Australia. Babinda and Tully annually compete for the Golden Gumboot, an award for Australia's wettest town. Babinda is usually the winner, and has an annual average rainfall of 4,279.4 millimetres (168.48 in). In the 2021 census, the locality of Babinda had a population of 1,287.

Babinda is located south of Cairns and was known for historically being a "sugar town".

== Geography ==
Babinda is located 59.1 kilometres (36.7 mi) south of Cairns.

The town is noted for its proximity to Queensland's two highest mountains Mount Bartle Frere (Queensland's highest peak) and Mount Bellenden Ker.

The Bruce Highway enters the locality from the south (Mirriwinni), passes through the town, and exits to the north (Bellenden Ker). The North Coast railway line also enters the locality from the south (Mirrinwinni), passes through the town, and exits to the north (Bellenden Ker). The locality was served by two railway stations:

- Babinda railway station, serving the town (17.3432°S 145.9253°E)
- Palma railway station, once serving the north of the locality but now abandoned (17.3196°S 145.9283°E)

== History ==
Babinda takes its name from the local Indigenous Australian language for mountain. Other sources, however, claim it is a Yidinji word for water, possibly referring to the high rainfall of the area.

Operations to build a sugar mill commenced in 1914 and support services were expanded around this (see Babinda Sugar Mill).

Babinda State School opened on 4 November 1914. Initially occupying temporary premises, the school's first permanent site was 24-34 Church Street (17.34241°S 145.92151°E), now Babinda Swimming Pool and adjacent properties. In 1963, it expanded to offer secondary schooling to Year 10. The school relocated to its present site in Boulders Road in 1969, although it continued to use some facilities on the old site until 1973. In 1983, the school expanded to offer secondary schooling to Year 12.

Babinda Post Office opened by 1915 (a Babinda Creek receiving office had been open since 1891).

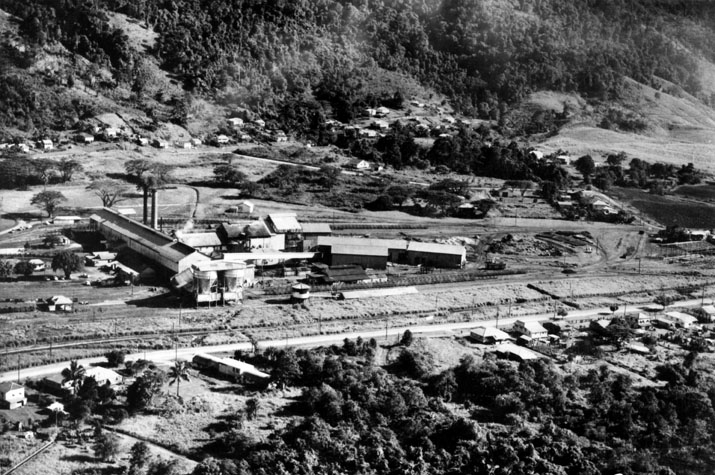
Babinda Sugar Mill, aerial view, circa 1964

The Babinda Sugar Mill opened on 15 September 1915. It closed on 23 February 2011. It was the main source of revenue and economic activity in the local area. Babinda was known for historically being a “sugar town” and the Mill was described as being the “lifeblood of the town”.

On 20 April 1916, the Cane Beetles March commenced at Mooliba (now Mirriwinni). It was a snowball march to recruit men into the Australian Imperial Force during World War I at a time when enthusiasm to enlist had waned after the loss of life in the Gallipoli campaign. The march began at Mooliba with 4 men, passing through Babinda, Aloomba, Gordonvale, and Edmonton, and ending in Cairns 60 kilometres later with 29 recruits.

Babinda Presbyterian church was officially opened on Sunday 5 November 1916 by Reverend S. Mitchell.

On Sunday 18 March 1917, Bishop John Heavey laid the foundation for Babinda's Catholic Church. Heavey returned on Sunday 15 July to dedicate the church.

On 10 March 1918, a cyclone badly damaged the town with some reports saying that no building was left standing. An entire train at the railway station was blown over. Both the Presbyterian and Catholic churches were "blown to pieces".

On Sunday 16 March 1919, the new Presbyterian Church was officially opened by the Reverend Fixter.

On Sunday 9 July 1922, Heavey officially opened and blessed the rebuilt Catholic church.

In November 1924, fund raising commenced for a Catholic school in Babinda. On 25 January 1926, the Sisters of Mercy opened St Rita's Catholic primary school, conducing classes for an initial 34 students inside the church. On 8 December 1945, Bishop Heavey officially opened the new two-storey brick school building, which replaced an earlier timber building. In 1948, it expanded to also offer secondary schooling, but, due to low enrolments, closed the secondary schooling in 1951.

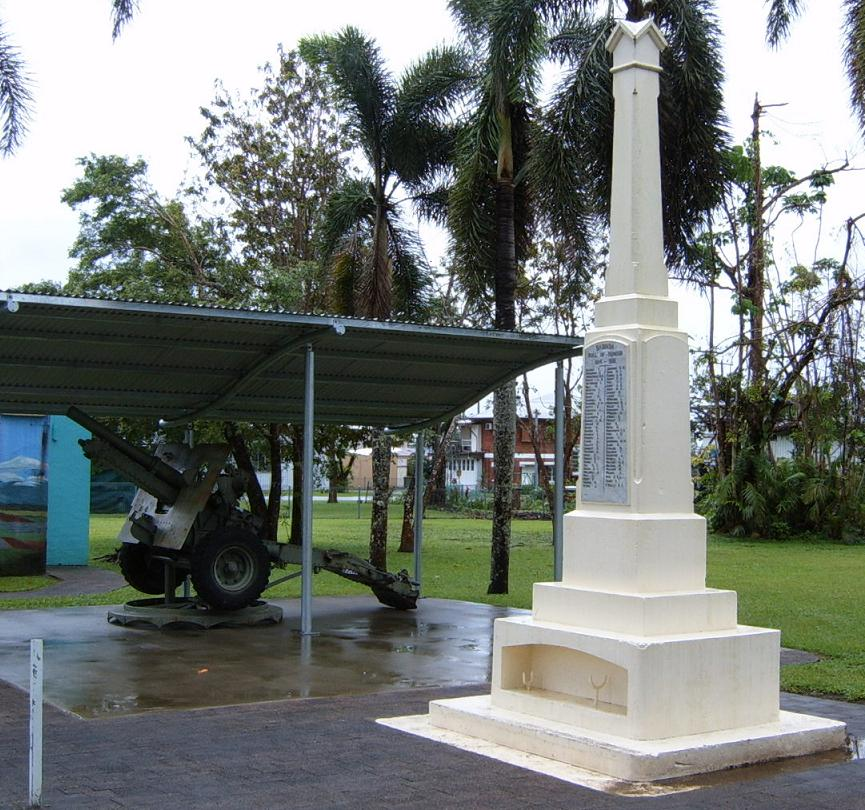
World War 1 memorial, Babinda, 2006

The Babinda War Memorial was unveiled by the chairman of the Cairns Shire Council Seymour Warner on 25 April 1927.

The Babinda Parish of the Roman Catholic Apostolic Vicariate of Cooktown (now the Roman Catholic Diocese of Cairns) was established in 1934.

The Babinda Public Library building opened in 1955.

In March 2006, Babinda was struck by Cyclone Larry, damaging up to 80% of buildings.

== Demographics ==
In the 2021 census, the locality of Babinda had a population of 1,287. Of these, 51.4% were male and 48.6% were female. The majority of residents (77.1%) were of Australian birth, with other common census responses being England (2.7%) and New Zealand (2.3%). The median age of Babinda residents was 48, 10 years higher than that of the general Australian population.

In the 2016 census, the locality of Babinda had a population of 1,253. Of these, 50.4% were male and 49.6% were female. The majority of residents (80.3%) were of Australian birth, with other common census responses being England (2.2%) and New Zealand (1.7%). The median age of Babinda residents was 47, 9 years higher than that of the general Australian population.

In the 2011 census, the locality of Babinda had a population of 1,068. Of these, 49.3% were male and 50.7% were female. The majority of residents (82.1%) were of Australian birth, with other common census responses being England (2.1%) and Italy (2.0%). The median age of Babinda residents was 43, 6 years higher than the general Australian population.

In the 2006 census, the locality of Babinda had a population of 1,167. Of these, 49.7% were male and 50.3% were female. The majority of residents (79.7%) were of Australian birth, with other common census responses being Italy (2.7%) and New Zealand (2.0%). The age distribution of Babinda residents was skewed slightly higher than the greater Australian population. 70.1% of residents were over 25 years in 2006, compared to the Australian average of 66.5%; and 29.9% were younger than 25 years, compared to the Australian average of 33.5%.

== Heritage listings ==
Babinda has a number of heritage-listed sites, including:

- Babinda State Hotel, 65–85 Munro Street (17.3446°S 145.9225°E)
- Babinda Air Raid Shelter, 109 Munro Street (17.3441°S 145.9208°E)

== Education ==
St Rita's School is a Catholic primary (Prep–6) school for boys and girls at 7–13 Church Street (17.3430°S 145.9225°E). In 2018, the school had an enrolment of 22 students with 7 teachers (5 full-time equivalent) and 6 non-teaching staff (3 full-time equivalent).

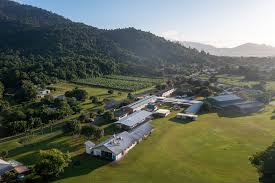
Babinda State School, 2025

Babinda State School is a government primary and secondary (Prep–12) school for boys and girls at Boulders Road (corner of Pollard Road, 17.3459°S 145.9126°E). In 2018, the school had an enrolment of 257 students with 30 teachers (27 full-time equivalent) and 22 non-teaching staff (13 full-time equivalent). It includes a special education program.

== Amenities ==
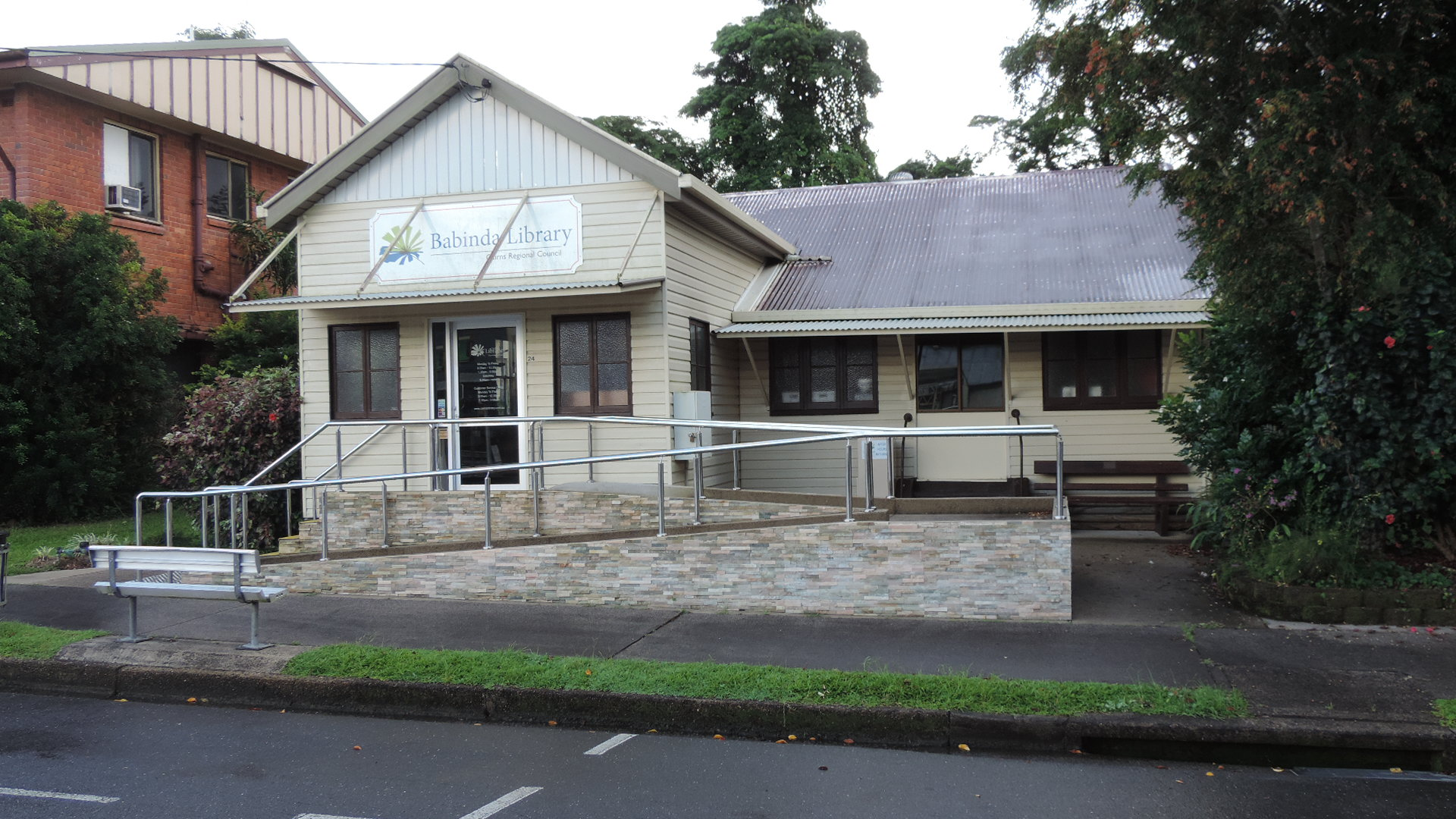
Babinda Public Library, 2018

The Cairns Regional Council operates a public library in Babinda at 24 Munro Street (17.3440°S 145.9239°E).

The Babinda branch of the Queensland Country Women's Association meets at the QCWA Hall at 17 King Street (via School Road, 17.3456°S 145.9209°E).

St Rita's Catholic Church is at 15 Church Street (17.3431°S 145.9221°E). It is within the Babinda Parish of the Roman Catholic Diocese of Cairns and is administered from Innisfail.

Babinda Presbyterian Church is at 25 Church Street (17.34298°S 145.92131°E). It is a charge of the Presbyterian Church of Queensland (that includes Gordonvale Presbyterian Church).

Babinda Bowls Club is at 110-114 Munro Street (17.3436°S 145.9206°E).

Babinda Munro Picture Theatre is a restored historic movie theatre at 97-101 Munro Street (17.3442°S 145.9215°E).

== Facilities ==
Babinda has the following emergency services:

- Babinda Police Station, 8 Munro Street (17.3441°S 145.9243°E)
- Babinda Fire Station, 44 Eastwood Street (17.3449°S 145.9214°E)
- Babinda SES Facility, 139 Howard Kennedy Drive (17.3403°S 145.9266°E)

Babinda Multi Purpose Health Centre is a public hospital at 128-130 Munro Street (17.3432°S 145.9187°E). It has 22 beds and an emergency department. Babinda Ambulance Station is located at the hospital (17.3434°S 145.9196°E).

There are two cemeteries in Babinda, both operated by the Cairns Regional Council:

- Old Babinda Cemetery on the eastern side of the Bruce Highway north of the town (17.3256°S 145.9274°E).
- New Babinda Cemetery on the eastern side of the highway south of the old cemetery, accessed via Nelson Road (17.3281°S 145.9266°E)

== Events ==
There are many different community events in Babinda. The annual Harvest Festival is celebrated in October and features some unusual events including the Sugar Bowl competition, the Gumboot Toss and the Umbrella Toss (reflecting Babinda's connection to the sugar industry and its wet weather). The festival has been running since the 1960s, but was cancelled in 2006 due to Cyclone Larry.

== Attractions ==
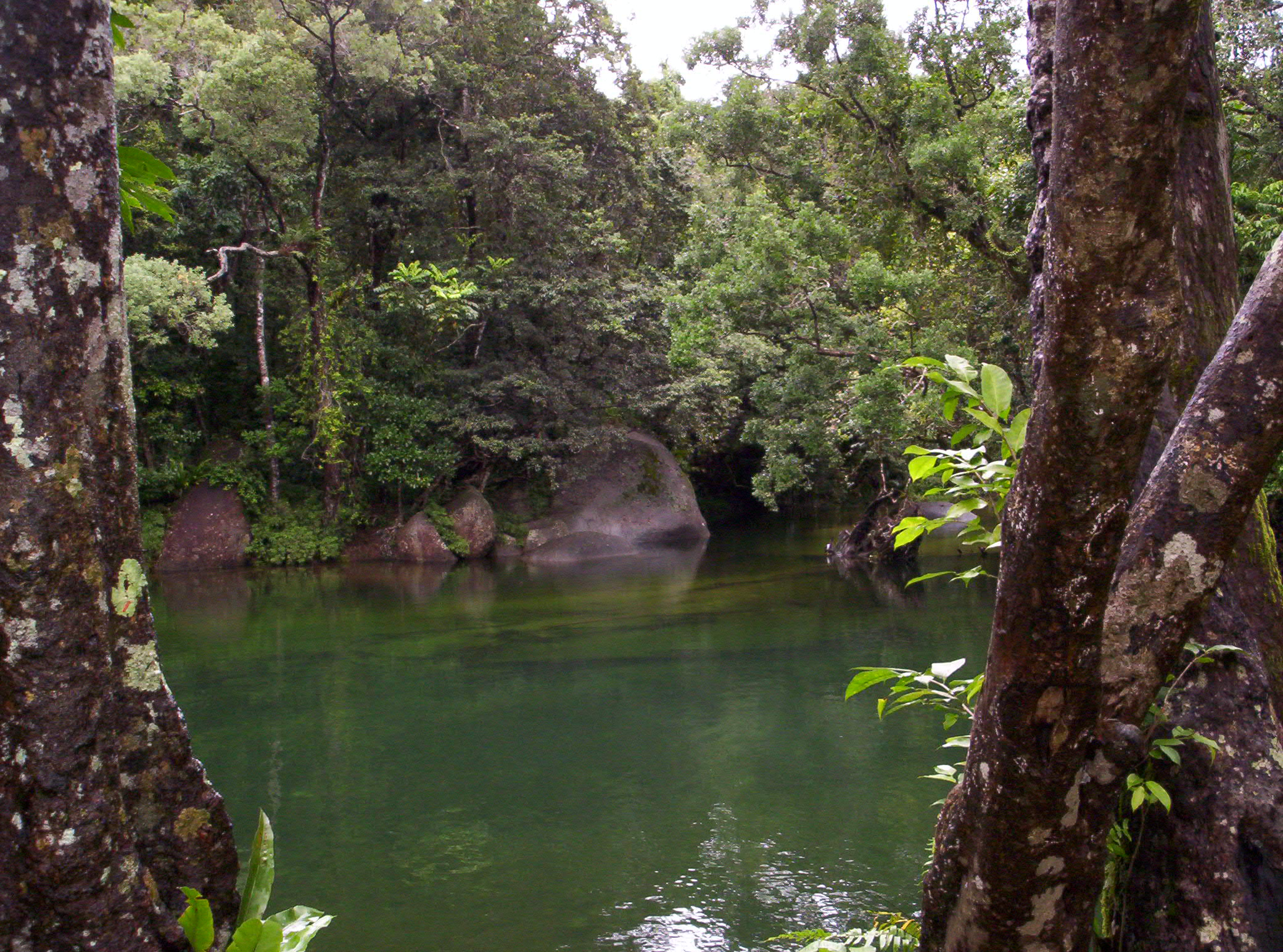
Babinda Creek, as seen from The Boulders picnic area

Babinda War Memorial is Anzac Park in Munro Street (17.34407°S 145.92072°E).

The Boulders and Devil's Pool are popular tourist attractions. A picnic area is located nearby, beside Babinda Creek.

Babinda Rotary Park is on Howard Kennedy Drive (17.3467°S 145.9264°E). It provides free camping for up to 3 days.

== Transportation ==
Babinda is situated on the Bruce Highway. The town has a railway station for access to the long-distance train services, currently only the Spirit of Queensland for which an advance booking must be made for the train to stop in Babinda.

== Climate ==
Babinda has a tropical rainforest climate (Af) with humid and persistently wet weather. It is well known and recognised as the wettest town in Australia, with an annual average rainfall of 4,279.4 millimetres (168.48 in). Monthly totals over 1,000 millimetres (39 in) are not uncommon, and sometimes, usually between January and April, whole months will go by without a single sunny day.

The wet season lasts from December to May, while the 'dry season' occurs from June to November. During the wet season, heavy monsoonal downpours occur almost daily and occasionally even heavier rain from tropical lows or cyclones occurs. Rainfall still totals well over 100 millimetres (3.9 in) a month during the dry season; however, it is usually in the form of coastal showers, which can range from 1 or 2 millimetres (0.039 or 0.079 in), to brief downpours of 100 millimetres (3.9 in) or more. Thunderstorms with dangerous lightning and damaging winds can be a threat from October to December; however, this threat decreases when the monsoon begins to take over in January.

Climate data for Babinda Post Office
Month	Jan	Feb	Mar	Apr	May	Jun	Jul	Aug	Sep	Oct	Nov	Dec	Year
Mean daily maximum °C (°F)	30.6 (87.1)	30.4 (86.7)	29.5 (85.1)	28.0 (82.4)	26.1 (79.0)	24.3 (75.7)	23.8 (74.8)	24.9 (76.8)	26.5 (79.7)	28.0 (82.4)	29.4 (84.9)	30.4 (86.7)	27.7 (81.8)
Mean daily minimum °C (°F)	23.2 (73.8)	23.3 (73.9)	22.5 (72.5)	21.0 (69.8)	19.0 (66.2)	16.7 (62.1)	15.7 (60.3)	16.2 (61.2)	17.6 (63.7)	19.6 (67.3)	21.5 (70.7)	22.7 (72.9)	19.9 (67.9)
Average precipitation mm (inches)	644.9 (25.39)	744.9 (29.33)	801.0 (31.54)	535.1 (21.07)	348.2 (13.71)	202.1 (7.96)	143.9 (5.67)	113.2 (4.46)	123.5 (4.86)	125.1 (4.93)	190.6 (7.50)	306.9 (12.08)	4,279.4 (168.5)
Source: bom.gov.au

== Notable residents ==
- Michael 'Tarzan' Fomenko (c.1930–2018), ocean rower and hermetic bushman, spent the end of his life in Babinda Hospital
- Sharyn Ghidella (born 1966), journalist, news presenter and spokesperson, was born in Babinda.
- Wilfrid Simmonds (1889–1967), pioneer of the local sugar industry and Country Party senator for Queensland (1950–1951).

== See also ==
- Suburbs of Cairns
- List of tramways in Queensland
