= Babinda Sugar Mill =

Australian business

Coordinates: 17°20′24″S 145°55′31″E

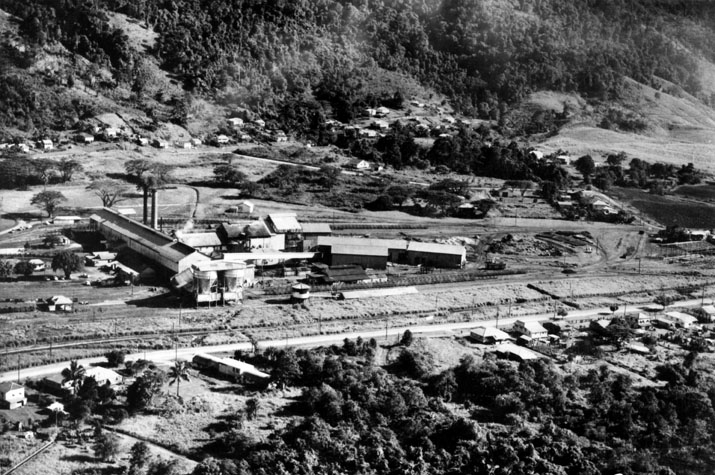
- Photo of the mill, which was active from 1915 to 2011

General information
- Location: Babinda, Queensland, Australia

The Babinda Sugar Mill was a sugar mill that operated in Babinda, Queensland, Australia from 1915 to 2011. The site of the mill is owned by MSF Sugar and is located next to the Bruce Highway.

== History ==
=== Background ===
Sugar cane production became a staple crop in the Far North Queensland, making it necessary for there to be a means of refining the product. The sugar industry was the primary source of economic stability and growth in the local area and was described as being a “foundation industry” for local economics.

Activities of the sugar mill were important in overall discussions about the economics of both the local area and wider economy. The mill closed on 23 February 2011.

=== Operations ===
The Babinda Sugar Mill opened on 15 September 1915 but some operations and building of the mill had begun in 1914. The address of the Babinda Mill was on the Bruce Hwy, Babinda, Queensland.

It was a source of food and employment for nearly a decade and important for the local area and great Australian food industry. As part of the Bundaberg Sugar Ltd reports are available from the Queensland government.

== Workforce ==
As of 2011, the mill employed around 60 workers, with employment numbers increased to 100 during peak crushing season. The Courier-Mail reported at the time of closure that many workers at the mill came from families with many relatives who had been employed at the mill.

== Closure and legacy ==
The closure of the mill in 2011 was reportedly a "huge shock to canegrowers" in the region. The banana production industry in the local area replaced some of the economic activity.

In 2014, the previous site of the mill was earmarked for a residential housing development project. The project was described as being large-scale which was predicted to generate an economic boom for the local area. In 2017, it was proposed as a site for a biorefinery.

An additional photo can be sourced from the 1930s from the Townsville library.
