= Stillage =

Transport structure with support

A stillage is like a pallet or skid, but with a cage or sides, or some form of support specifically tailored to the material it is intended to carry. Some are designed to be stackable.

Stillages are mainly used to transport goods, raise products off the ground, and can help to separate goods in transit without the need to load and unload the product being carried, which saves time and decreases the chance of damage. An example is the use of stillages in glass manufacturing, where they are shaped like an upright "A"; the plate glass leans inward and is strapped to the stillage ready for transport.

Stillages are usually manufactured using steel, and are a popular storage and logistic solution in the following fields: engineering, automotive, warehousing, and logistics. For return logistics, demounted stillages, or "post pallets" as they are also often referred to, help to occupy minimal vehicle space, helping to reduce transportation costs.

== Beverage and alcohol field ==
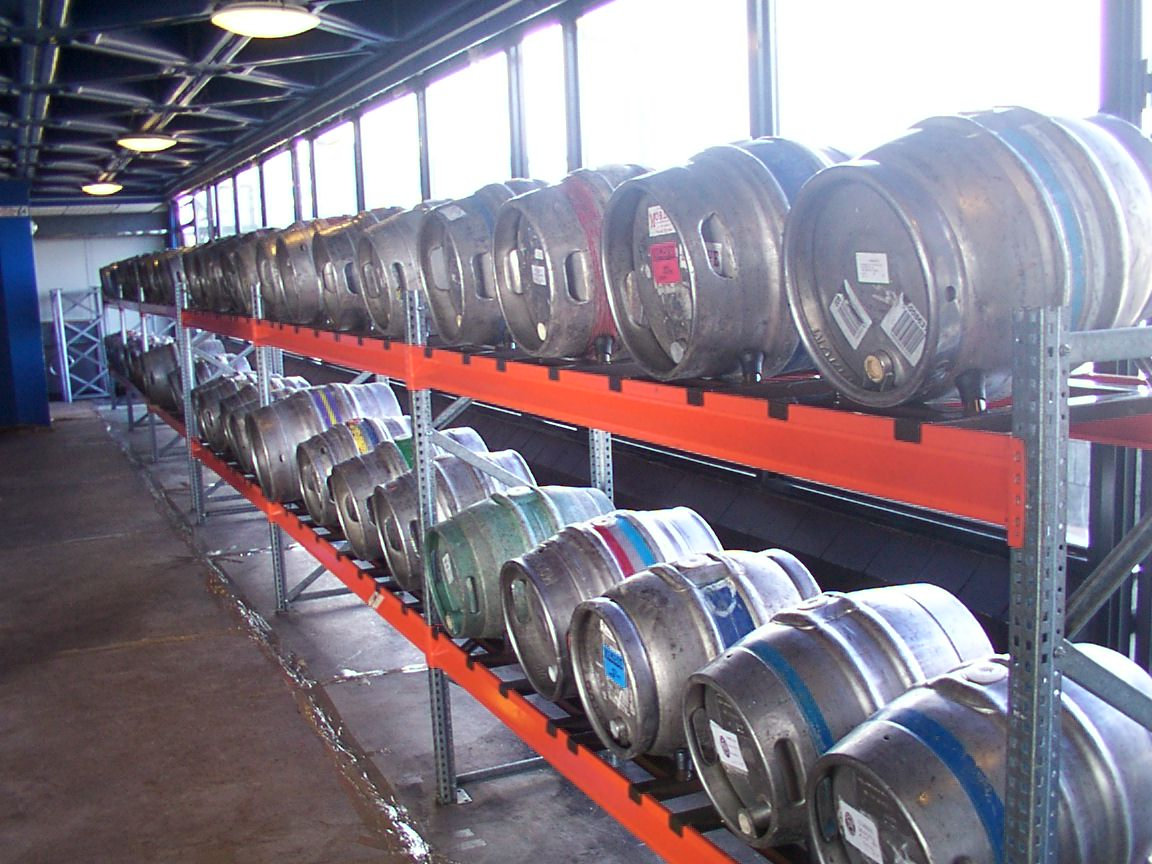
A stillage, consisting of metal racking, at University of Warwick's annual student beer festival.

A stillage is any device on which a cask of ale is placed for service.

Unlike kegs, which can be simply stood upright on the floor, casks are used lying on their sides. This allows the beer to run from the tap under gravity, with room in the "belly" of the cask below the outlet for the finings to collect. The shive with the spile will then be the highest point on the cask. As the beer clears (see finings), the inside of the cask becomes coated with sediment. It is important that the stillage holds the cask absolutely still with no rocking or shaking; otherwise, the sediment will be shaken into suspension and the beer will be cloudy.

A stillage need not be complicated – anything that will support a cask (preferably on three points to avoid any wobbling) will do. At temporary events, sturdy tables or frames made of scaffolding and planks might be used, with the casks placed on wooden wedges (two at the front, one at the back). By contrast, many pub cellars use specially-made steel racking, often with two rows of casks, one above the other. Some pubs have brick or stone stillages, sometimes quite ancient, built into the wall of the cellar.

As the cask empties, it needs to be gently tilted to obtain the last of the beer. With wooden wedges, moving the rear wedge forward will achieve this; purpose-built metal units often have springs incorporated that automatically tilt the cask as it becomes lighter. This requires less effort from bar staff, and also helps beer quality – the lift is so smooth and gradual that there is no danger of stirring up the lees and making the beer cloudy.
