= Keystone (cask) =

A cask. The untapped keystone is clearly visible in the bunghole below the label.

A keystone is a small wooden or plastic fitting used in ale casks. For some years wooden casks have been effectively obsolete, with the majority now being aluminium or stainless steel, and a few sturdy plastic ones beginning to appear. Nevertheless, the standard tap is still designed to be hammered into yielding material, punching a hole as it goes. All modern casks, even the few wooden ones still in use, use a replaceable keystone to accept the tap.

== Background ==
The bunghole of the cask is on one of the circular faces, near the rim. When the cask is in service, it is laid on its side with the bunghole at the lowest point on the circumference. The keystone is a small thick wooden or plastic disk inserted into the bunghole which completely seals the cask until it is needed.

The center of the keystone is deliberately weakened; this area may be marked or unmarked and is called the tut. In the plastic variety it is much thinner than the surrounding material; if made of wood it is partially pre-cut so that it is easier to punch out. Some time before the cask is to be served, the end of the tap is placed against this weakened section and, with the aid of a mallet, driven through it. The shaft of the tap is tapered, so that as it is forced in fully it seals against the undisturbed outer part of the keystone. A small amount of beer may leak out during this process, but with sufficient skill and firm action with the mallet, no spillage at all can occur.

When the cask is empty, it is a courtesy to the drayman (the brewery's delivery driver who also collects the empty casks) to stop up the hole in the keystone with a small cork bung which can be obtained for this purpose. This prevents old beer being spilled on them or in their vehicle. Similarly, the shive hole may be sealed with a spile.

It is common for wooden keystones to acquire a layer of mould on the outside between filling and tapping. This does not indicate a problem with the beer, but because part of the keystone is driven into the cask (where it floats on top of the beer) it must be thoroughly cleaned before the cask is tapped. This action is worthwhile even when plastic keystones are used.

== Changing a tap or keystone ==
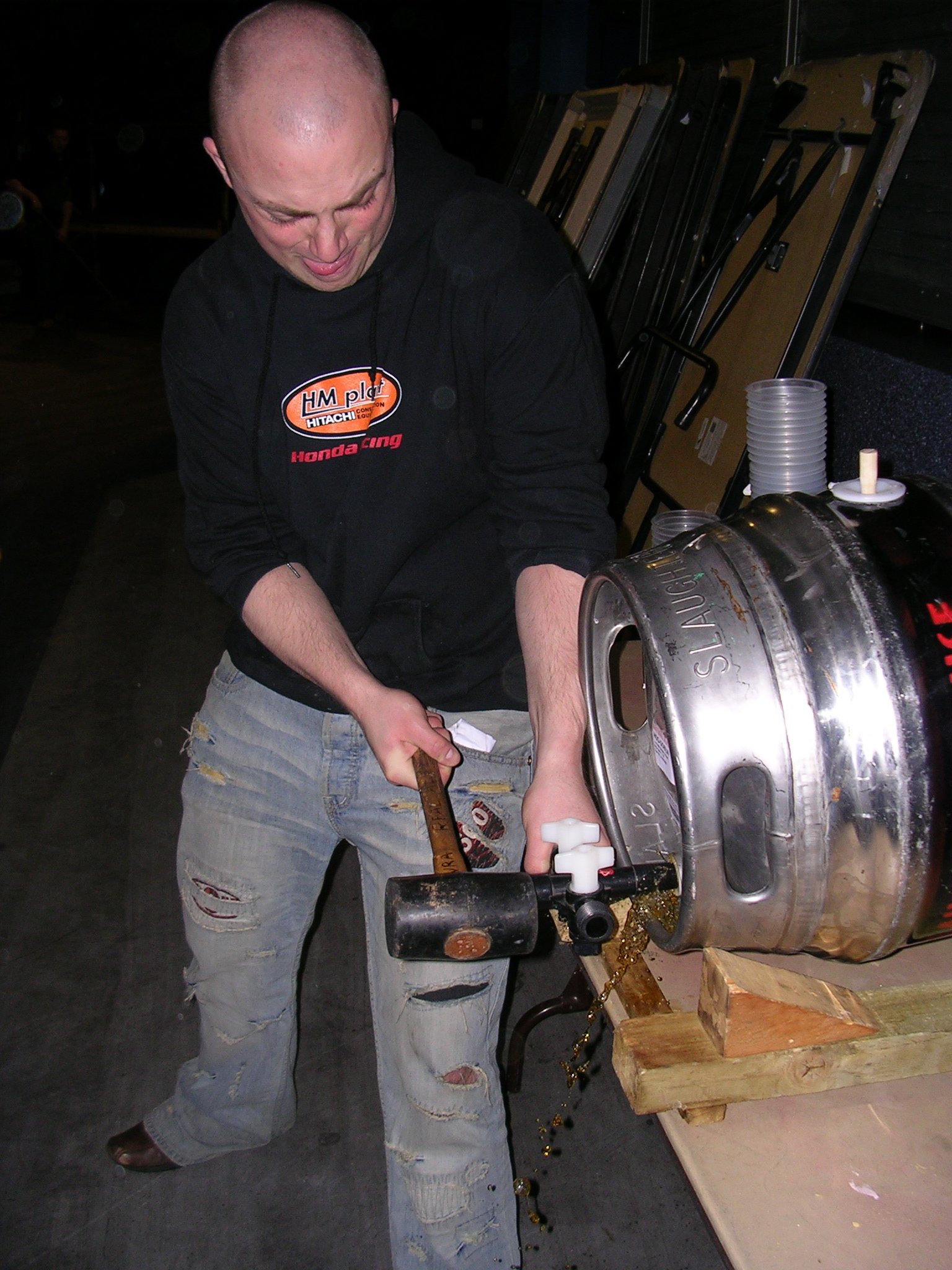
Tapping a cask. The escaping beer is due to insufficient force with the mallet, swiftly rectified with a second blow of the mallet.

Due to the somewhat rustic nature of this standard connection system, leaks occasionally appear. If beer is leaking around the tap then hammering it further in will normally fix the problem; otherwise the keystone itself may be split or the tap may be faulty and the offending item will need to be changed.

Because of the way ale is conditioned, upending the cask to bring the keystone above the level of the liquid would render the beer undrinkable for at least a day and probably longer, and depending on the condition of the finings may have a permanent effect. Instead, the keystone must be changed in situ. Perhaps surprisingly, this can be achieved without serious loss of beer: half a pint or so is reasonable and half that again is eminently possible.

1. If possible (depending on the severity of the leak) soak the new keystone in water for some hours to render it less brittle. Ordinarily, they will have been softened by contact with the beer. This step is of course not necessary if using plastic keystones.
2. Ensure the keystone is the correct size for the cask. Most keystones will fit most casks but there are exceptions and the time to find out is not as the beer chugs out round it.
3. Hammer a hard spile or perhaps even a plastic sealing peg into the shive hole. This prevents air entering and helps hold the beer in the cask.
4. Take hold of the tap and move it around to dislodge the old keystone from the cask.
5. When the old keystone is very loose, get ready to swap it for the new one. It may be easier to have one person remove the old keystone and another insert the new one. Hold the new keystone just to one side of the bung hole.
6. Swiftly remove the old keystone and insert the new one, then give it a tap with the mallet. If done smoothly, hardly any beer will be lost.
7. Hammer the tap through the keystone as normal.

If the tap is the problem, one may either replace the keystone as above and insert a new tap, or perform a similar operation but removing only the tap, leaving the keystone in place, and quickly inserting a new tap in the hole. Some authorities recommend using a small cork bung between removing the old tap and inserting the new one.

== Notes ==
This is more likely to be the case at beer festivals where there are many taps, infrequently used and maintained. A possibly-faulty tap is not worth having in a pub where casks are changed all year round.
