= Distillery 291 =

Coordinates: 38.809846°N 104.825784°W

Distillery 291 is a whiskey distillery in Colorado Springs, Colorado.

Distillery 291 produces grain-to-glass whiskey from a small production facility. Two of its best-known whiskeys are 291 Colorado Rye Whiskey and 291 Colorado Bourbon Whiskey. Both brands are charcoal mellowed with Colorado aspen staves.

Distillery 291 Whiskey has won numerous awards for its whiskey brands. Distillery 291 whiskey is sold in Colorado and California.

== History ==
Distillery 291 was established on September 11, 2011, by Michael Myers. A New York City fashion photographer, Myers moved to Colorado after 2001.

On a flight home from New York, Myers read an article about the creator of Sailor Jerry and Hendrick's Gin, and thought, "I could do that." In Colorado Springs, Myers made an agreement with Mike Bristol, owner of Bristol Brewing Company] for assistance in getting started. On September 11, 2011, Distillery 291 produced its first batch of whiskey.

== Product description ==
=== El Paso County Process ===
Distillery 291 uses a technique called El Paso County Process in whiskey production. Created by founder, Michael Myers, El Paso County Process is the action of taking a finished beer, boiling off the alcohol and using a percentage of that stillage mixed with a water mash in the next batch.

== Television appearances ==
Distillery 291 Colorado Whiskey appears to be the whiskey of choice for character Beau in Season 2 of Netflix's The Ranch.

== Awards ==
291 Colorado Rye Whiskey

- World's Best Rye, World Whiskies Awards, Whisky Magazine, 2018
- Best American Rye, World Whiskies Awards, Whisky Magazine, 2018
- Gold Medal: San Francisco World Spirits Competition, 2017
- Double Gold Medal: Denver International Spirits Competition 2017
- Best American Rye Whisky / No Age Statement: Whisky Magazine World Whisky Awards 2016
- 94 Points Barrel #2: Jim Murray's Whisky Bible 2013
- People's Choice Award: Breckenridge Craft Spirits Festival Awards 2014, 2015, 2016

291 Colorado Bourbon Whiskey

- Silver Medal: Denver International Spirits Competition 2017
- Gold Medal: Denver International Spirits Competition 2016
- 91 Points Barrel #1: Jim Murray's Whisky Bible 2016
- Double Gold: San Francisco World Spirits Competition 2016
- People's Choice Award: Breckenridge Craft Spirits Festival Awards 2014, 2015, 2016

291 American Whiskey

- People's Choice Award: Breckenridge Craft Spirits Festival Awards 2014, 2015, 2016

291 Fresh Whiskey

- 87.5 Points Batch #1: Jim Murray's Whisky Bible 2013
- People's Choice Award: Breckenridge Craft Spirits Festival Awards 2014, 2015, 2016

291 Colorado Rye Whiskey White Dog

- 90 Points Batch #1: Jim Murray's Whisky Bible
- People's Choice Award: Breckenridge Craft Spirits Festival Awards 2014, 2015, 2016

The Decc

- Gold 93 Points: Beverage Tasting Institute 2014
- People's Choice Award: Breckenridge Craft Spirits Festival Awards 2014, 2015, 2016

291 Colorado Whiskey Barrel Proof

- Best American Rye Whisky / No Age Statement: Whisky Magazine World Whisky Awards 2016
- People's Choice Award: Breckenridge Craft Spirits Festival Awards 2014, 2015, 2016

291 Colorado Bourbon Whiskey Barrel Proof

- People's Choice Award: Breckenridge Craft Spirits Festival Awards 2014, 2015, 2016

291 HR Colorado Bourbon Whiskey

- People's Choice Award: Breckenridge Craft Spirits Festival Awards 2014, 2015, 2016

291 Bad Guy Colorado Bourbon Whiskey

- Silver Medal: San Francisco World Spirits Competition, 2017
- Gold Medal: Denver International Spirits Competition, 2017
- 95.5 Points Barrel #1: Jim Murray's Whisky Bible, 2014
- Gold: Breckenridge Craft Spirits Festival Awards 2013, 2016
- People's Choice Award: Breckenridge Craft Spirits Festival Awards 2014, 2015, 2016

291 E Colorado Whiskey

2015 ”E” Batch #1 Colorado Rye Whisky 126.1 Proof

- 95.5 Points Barrel #1: Jim Murray's Whisky Bible, 2017

2016“E” Batch #2 Colorado Bourbon Whisky 126.8 Proof

- Silver Medal: San Francisco World Spirits Competition, 2017
