= Shive =

Plastic lining

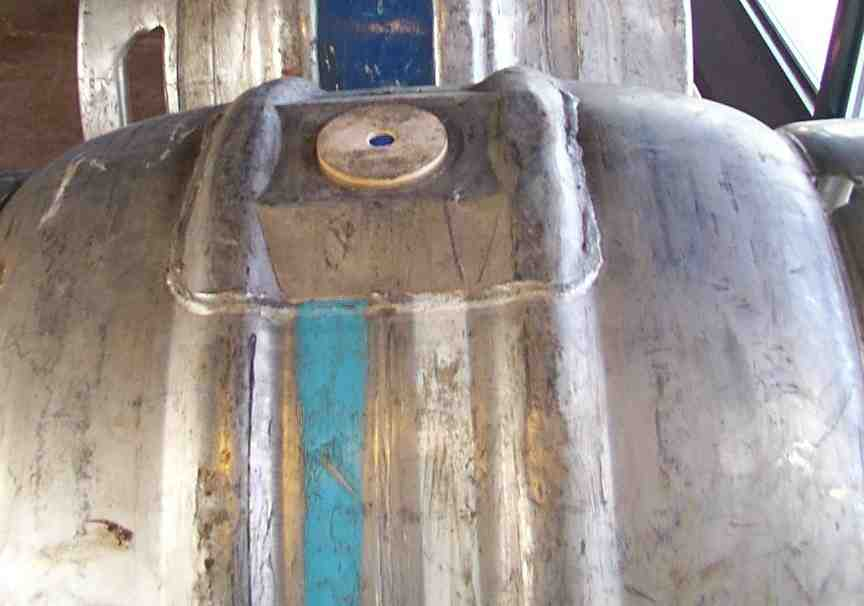
The top of a cask, showing an unopened wooden shive with a plastic seal.

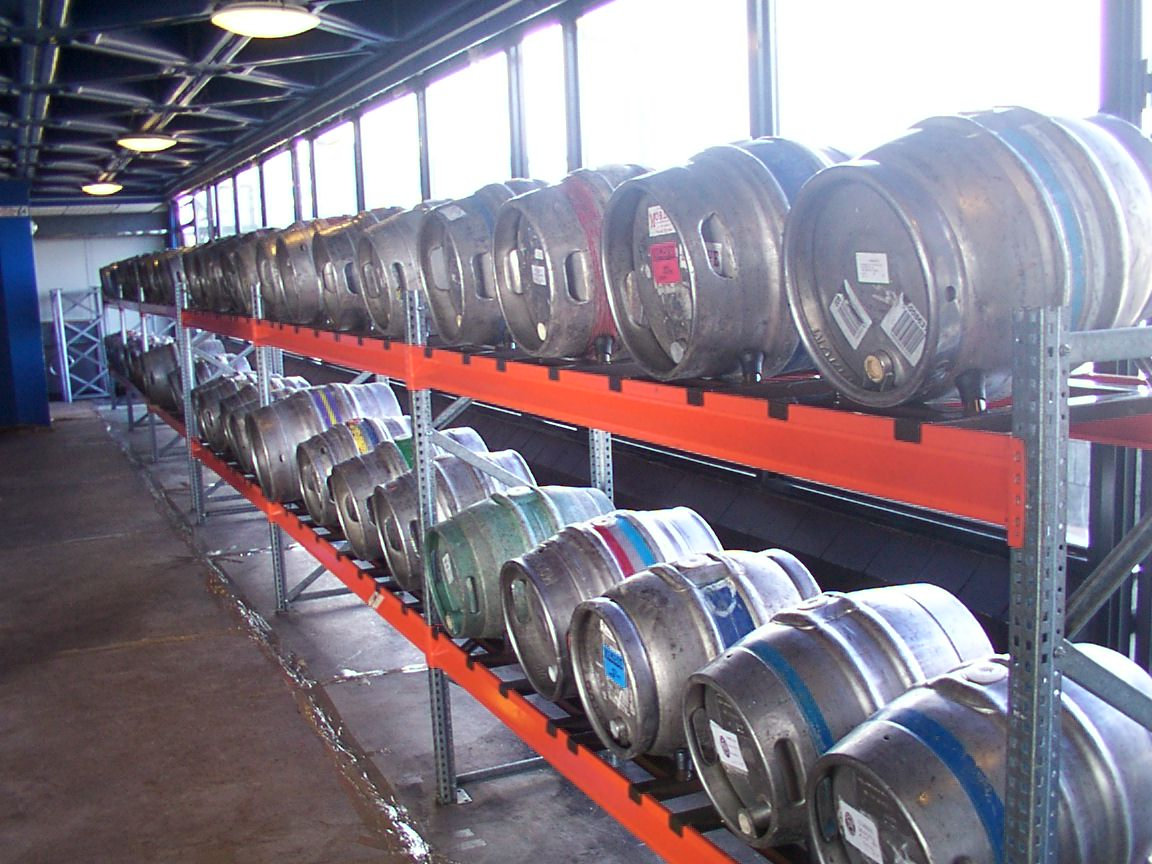
Ale casks on a rack. The shives are uppermost, with the unopened keystones to the front.

A shive is a wooden or plastic fitting used in ale casks. It is found on the curved side of the cask, arranged so that when the cask is on its side and the keystone is at the lowest part of the rim, the shive will be the highest point of the cask.

The hole in that part of the cask is used for two purposes. Firstly, it is used for cleaning out and then refilling the cask, which requires a large hole. Once the cask arrives at its destination, the hole is used to control the amount of carbon dioxide present in the container, which requires a small hole. The shive is effectively an adaptor that reconciles these conflicting requirements. It is a wooden disk, larger than a keystone, that fits in the hole in the cask and has a smaller hole in its centre.

For washing and filling, the old shive is removed using a chisel or a special tool, revealing a hole around 3 inches (7.5 cm) across. Once the cask has been filled and fined, a new shive is hammered into place. The hole in the centre of the shive will be sealed with a small wooden or plastic peg. The cask is then transported to the pub.

Some time before the beer is to be served (two or three days is common; especially strong beers may require more) the cask is opened or "vented". This entails breaking the seal in the middle of the shive by punching it through into the cask with a mallet and some kind of tool, usually just a hard spile. A spile is then placed in the hole to regulate the gas flow. If the beer is particularly "lively" (common in warm weather and with specific beers) the contents may spray out when the cask is vented.

During use, the hole in the centre of the shive can also be used (with the spile removed) to insert a marked dipstick in order to measure the quantity of beer remaining.

As with keystones, it is considered good form to close up the hole in the shive when returning empty casks, both to prevent spillage and to reduce bacterial and fungal contamination.
