= Beer head =

Frothy foam on top of beer

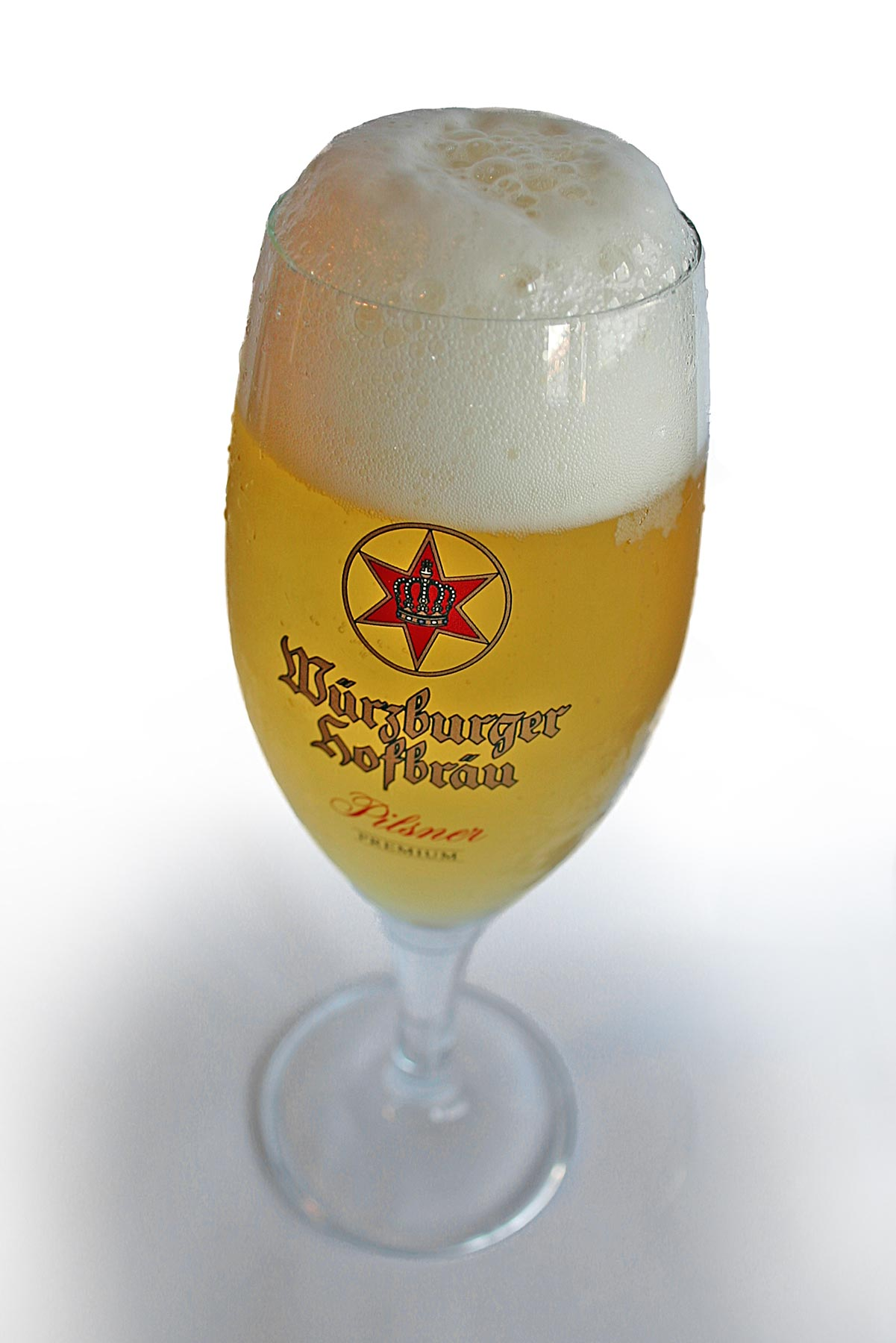
A glass of beer with a large head of foam

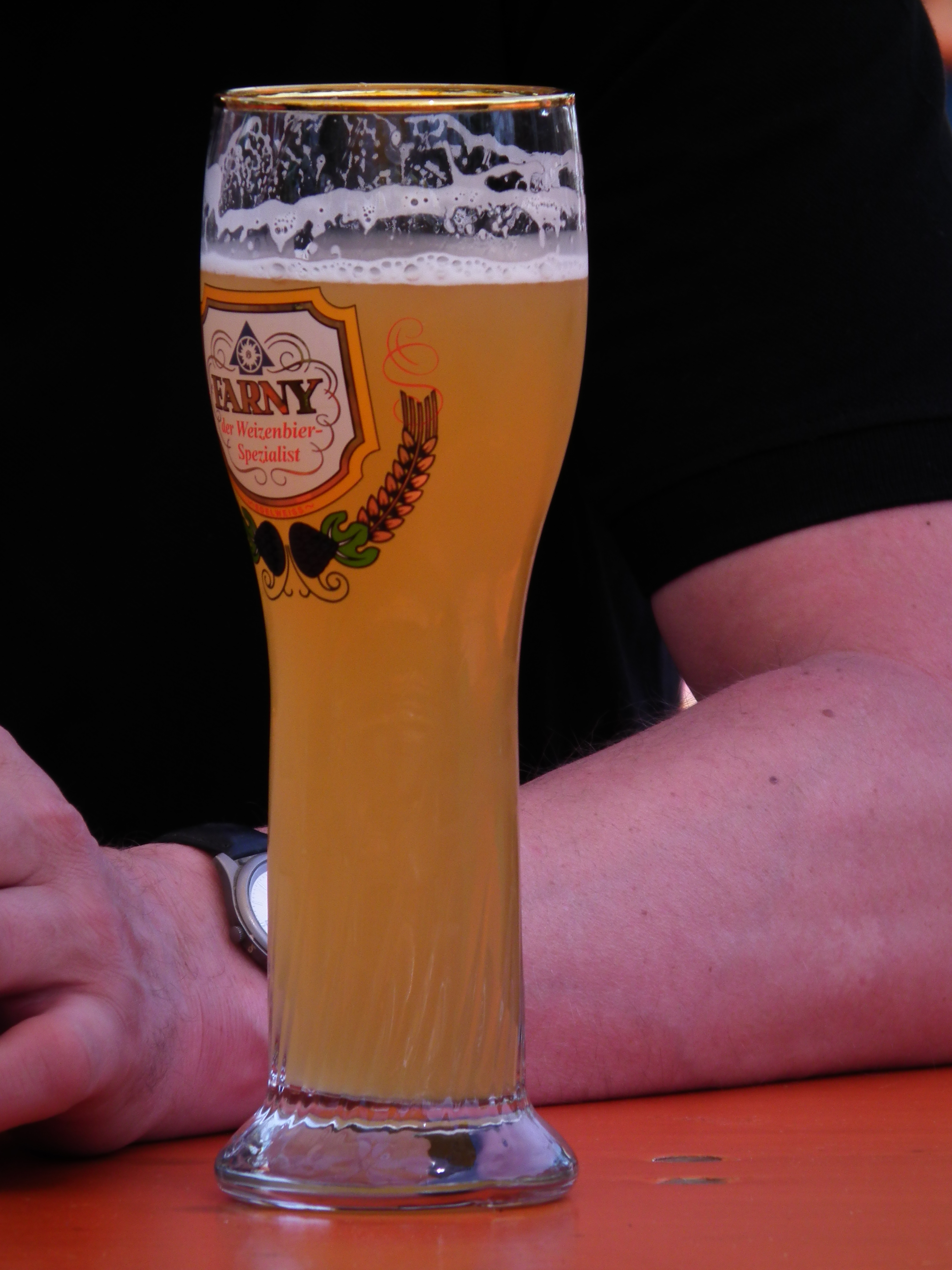
A glass of beer with the head having receded, leaving behind noticeable lacing

Beer head (also head or collar) is the frothy foam on top of beer and carbonated beverages which is produced by bubbles of gas, predominantly carbon dioxide, rising to the surface. The elements that produce the head are wort protein, yeast and hop residue. The carbon dioxide that forms the bubbles in the head is produced during fermentation as yeasts break down sugar-rich molecules to produce ethanol and carbon dioxide. The carbonation can occur before or after bottling the beer. If the beer continues fermenting in the bottle, then it naturally carbonates and the head is formed upon opening and pouring the beer. If the beer is pasteurized or filtered then the beer must be force carbonated using pressurized gas.

The density and longevity of the head will be determined by the type of malt and adjunct from which the beer was fermented. Different mash schedules and cereal sources influence head retention. In general, wheat tends to produce larger and longer-lasting heads than barley.

Closely related to the beer head is "lacing" or "lace", a white foamy residue left on the inside of the glass as the head recedes or as the beer is drunk. Just as the composition of the beer (proteins, hops, yeast residue, filtration) affects a beer's head, the amount of lacing is also closely controlled by the specific composition of the beer, and beer connoisseurs can tell much by the lacing, though strictly speaking beer quality is not readily apparent by the head or the lacing.

== Importance ==
Consumers tend to place a lot of importance on beer heads: too much of a head is undesirable because it detracts from the mass of the drink (similar to carbonated soda drinks); on the other hand, a poured beer is viewed as incomplete unless it has the specific form of head expected for the type of beer. Some connoisseurs view the head on a beer as important because it helps provide the aroma of the beer. Another opinion is that it is important for the aesthetic look of the beer. The commercial significance of the head has led to academic studies.

At least one study suggests that the head assists in the transport of beer after pouring by damping oscillation (sloshing) and converting vertical movement into horizontal movement.

== Formation through carbon dioxide ==
The carbon dioxide may be produced naturally through the activity of brewers yeast, or artificially by dissolving carbon dioxide under pressure into the liquid. The beer head is created by the carbon dioxide produced as a byproduct of the metabolism of brewer's yeast acting upon starches and sugars found in the wort.

== Chemical composition ==
While the actual foam activity of beer depends on the presence of carbon dioxide, it is the surface-active materials like amphipathic polypeptides from malt that determine size, shape and length of the foam.

Beer foam consists of polypeptides of five different classifications, divided by their relative hydrophobicity. As the hydrophobicity of the polypeptide groups increases, so does the stability of the foam.

Carbonation occurs when carbon dioxide is dissolved in water or an aqueous solution. This process is generally represented by the following reaction, where water and gaseous carbon dioxide react to form a dilute solution of carbonic acid.

== Importance of the glass ==
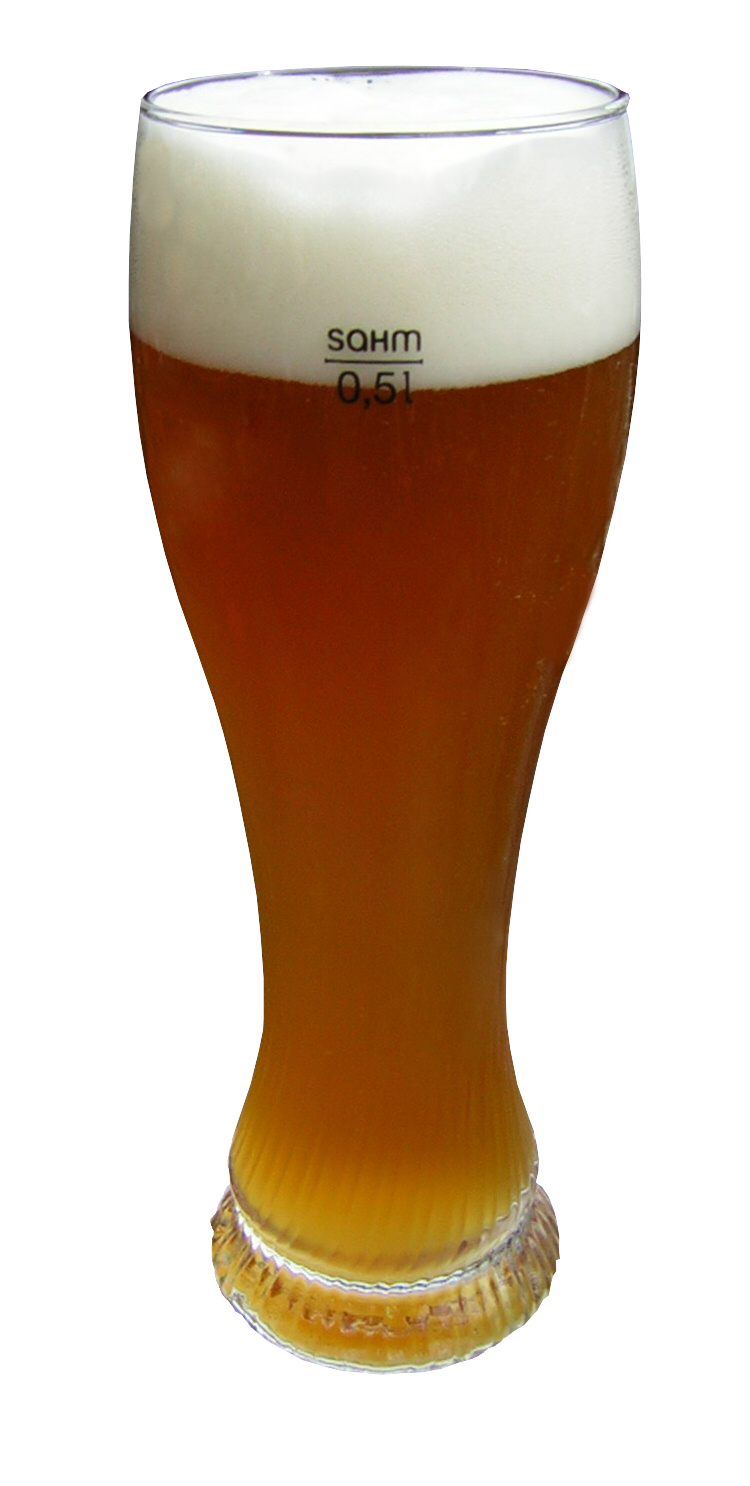
A German wheat beer served in the traditional glassware. The glass has a half litre fill line and is designed with extra space specifically to accommodate the head.

Beer glassware is often designed to accentuate or accommodate the head. Many other properties of the glass can also influence a beer head, such as a roughened surface at the base of glass known as a widget, providing for nucleation of carbon dioxide deep in the beverage rather than at the surface, resulting in a slower release of gas to the atmosphere.

Glass surfaces can retain oil from the skin, aerosolized oil from nearby cooking, and traces of fat from food. When these oils come in contact with beer there is a significant reduction in the amount of head (foam) that is found on the beer, and the bubbles will tend to stick to the side of the glass rather than rising to the surface as normal.

For proper foam formation, it is also important to dry the glass thoroughly after washing. Any water in the glass can prevent excitement of the gas by covering designs set in the bottom of the glass, thus making the beer flat. Conversely, some styles such as Belgian witbier benefit from being poured into a wet glass to control the often abundant head.

== Formation of 'nitrogen head' ==
The creamy head on beers such as Guinness is created by a widget in cans or bottles using nitrogen, or by the process of drawing keg beer from a keg using nitrogen or mixed gas (carbon dioxide and nitrogen). The use of nitrogen, which was pioneered by Guinness, creates a firm head with small bubbles while reducing the excessively acidic taste often produced by using carbon dioxide alone.

== Destabilization ==
One mechanism of destabilization of a beer foam is due to gravitational drainage. The water or liquid between the bubbles will drain and cause the liquid and gas phases to separate. This allows for the bubbles to become close enough to merge. This can be slowed down by increasing the viscosity of the liquid.

Another mechanism of destabilization is Ostwald ripening. Gas will diffuse from smaller bubbles to larger bubbles due to the high pressure associated with smaller bubbles. This can be explained by Laplace pressure. This can be slowed by a low solubility of the gas. An example of this is adding nitrogen to the beer. A large effect can be seen with only a 20ppm addition of nitrogen gas.

Beer froth has been scientifically demonstrated to decay exponentially. This research was awarded the 2002 Ig Nobel Prize in Physics.

A study published in 2025 in Physics of Fluids analyzed the physical and biochemical mechanisms that determine the stability of beer foam, comparing lagers and Belgian ales with different fermentation processes. The researchers identified two main modes of stabilization: surface viscosity prevails in lagers, while in Belgian tripels, stability is due to strong Marangoni stresses generated by surface tension gradients; the concentration of the LTP1 protein increases with the number of fermentations, improving foam duration. The study suggests that different strategies can be adopted to optimize foam depending on the type of beer, such as increasing surface viscosity in lagers or controlling proteolytic activity and protein composition to optimize Marangoni stresses in Belgian ales.

== Regulation ==
In the United Kingdom, the head is included in the measure of the beer, when serving. The Campaign for Real Ale believes that it should not be counted, and that customers should be entitled to ask for a full, liquid pint when ordering.
