= Cask breather =

Aspirator used in serving draught beer

A cask breather (sometimes called a cask aspirator) is a type of demand valve used to serve draught beer. The cask breather enables the empty space created when beer is drawn from a beer cask to be filled with carbon dioxide from an external source. This prevents ambient air from being drawn into the cask, thus extending the life of the beer by preventing oxidation.

To avoid carbonation of the beer, the carbon dioxide gas added by a cask breather is at low pressure, unlike the high pressure gas used to pressurize keg beer. Cask breathers are typically used in conjunction with a pressure regulator to ensure the gas pressure is sufficiently low.

Before 2018, the use of cask breathers was opposed by the Campaign for Real Ale (CAMRA), a policy that was changed in April 2018 to allow pubs using cask breathers to be classified as real ale pubs and listed in the Good Beer Guide.

== See also ==
- Beer engine
