= Barrel =

Hollow cylindrical container

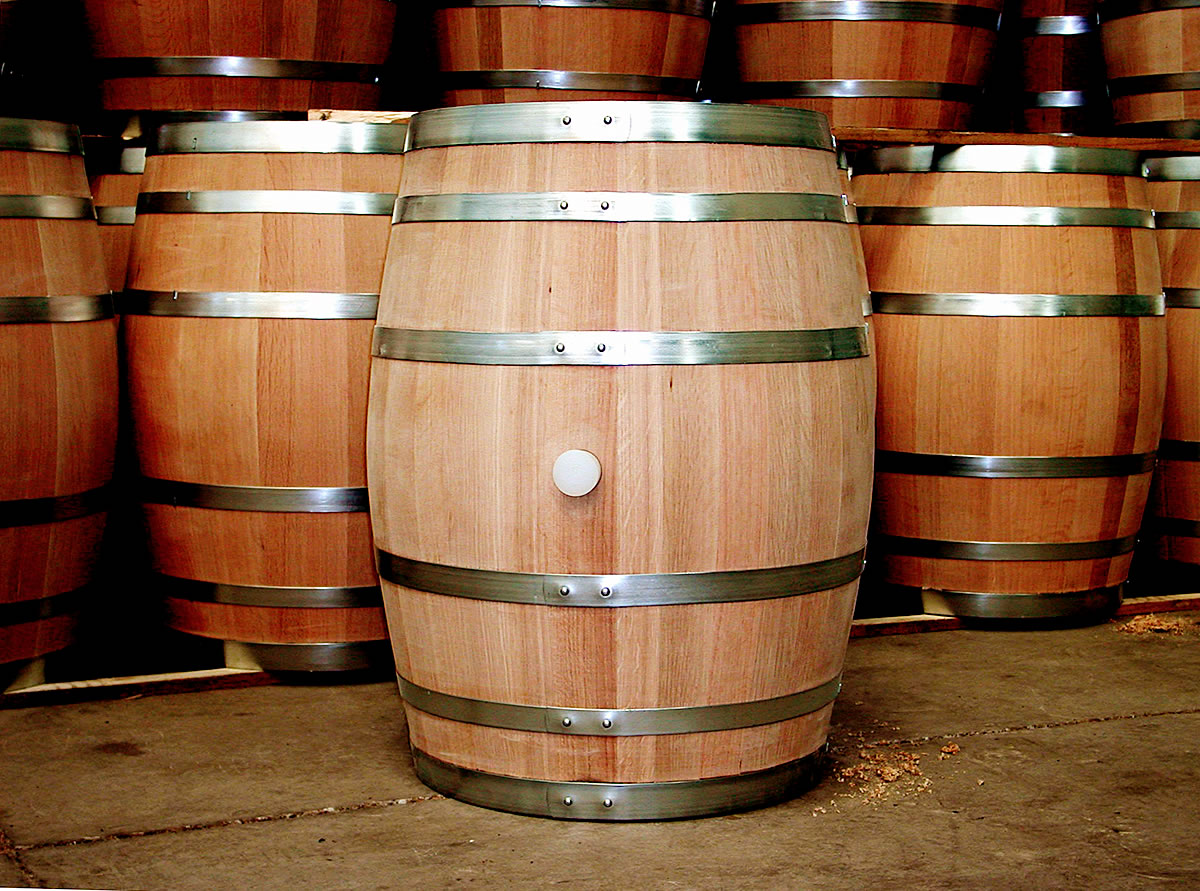
Traditional oak barrels made by Chilean cooperage Tonelería Nacional

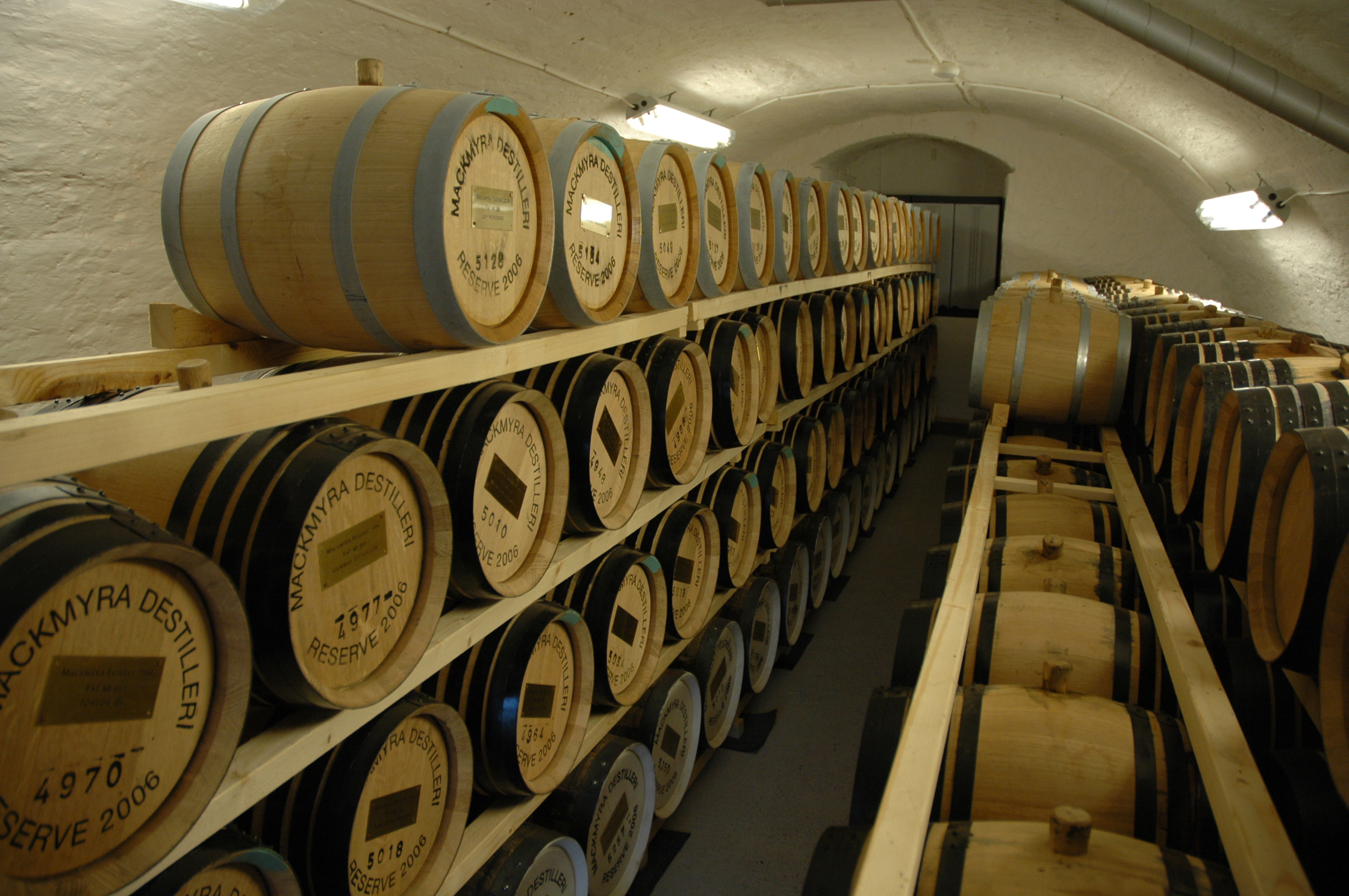
Mackmyra barrels at Häckeberga Castle

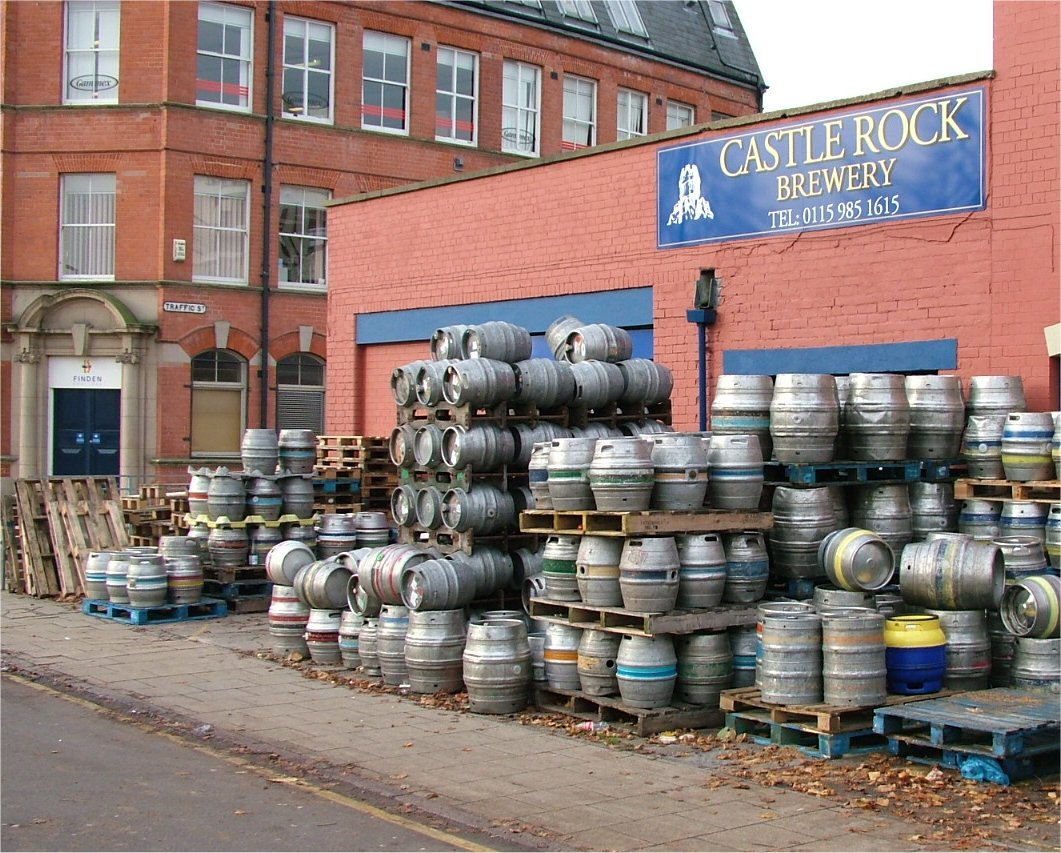
Modern stainless steel casks and kegs outside the Castle Rock microbrewery in Nottingham, England

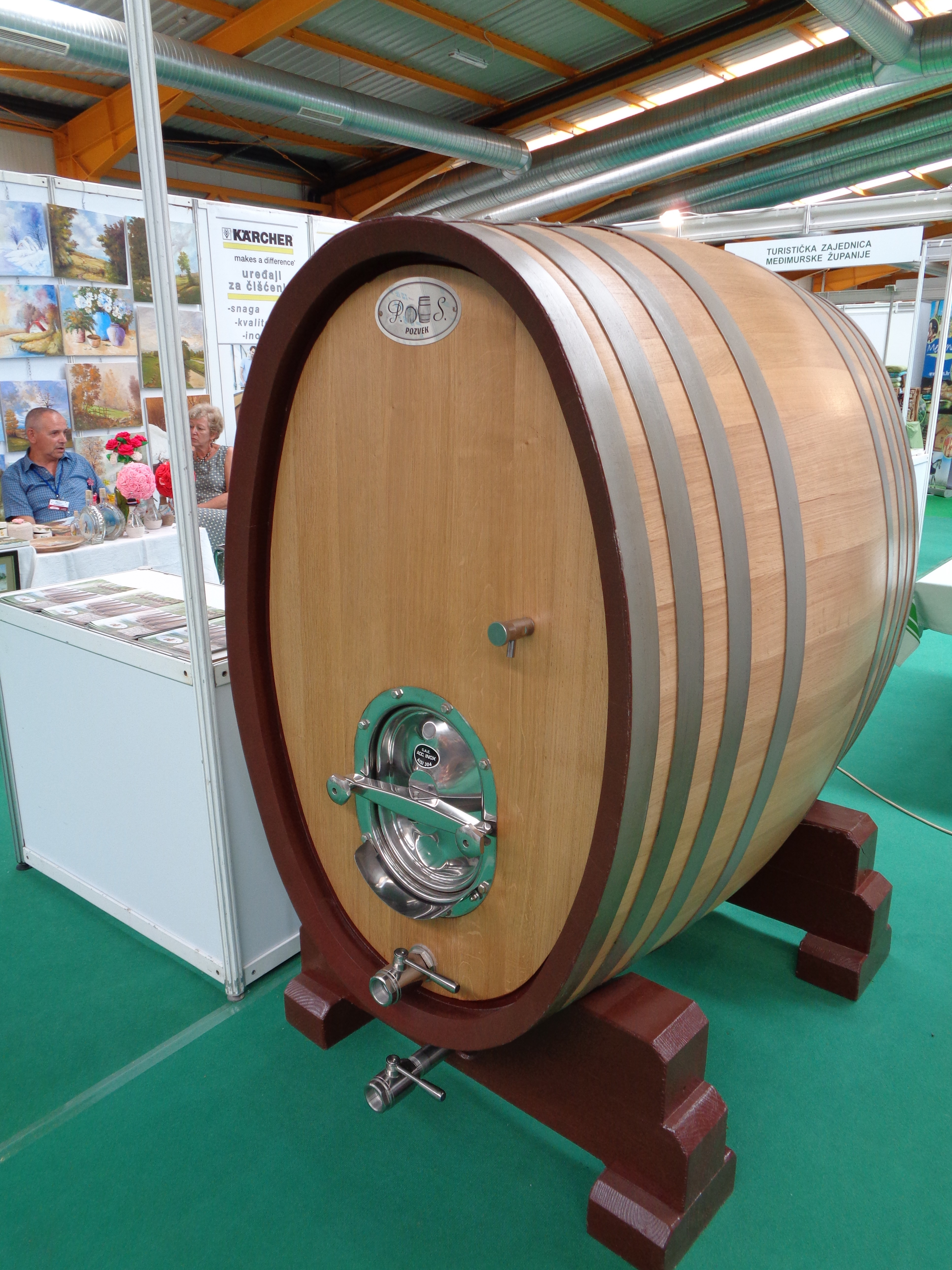
Wooden wine barrel at an exhibition in Croatia

A barrel or cask is a hollow cylindrical container with a bulging center, longer than it is wide. They are traditionally made of wooden staves and bound by wooden or metal hoops. The word vat is often used for large containers for liquids, usually alcoholic beverages; a small barrel or cask is known as a keg.

Barrels have a variety of uses, including storage of liquids such as water, oil, and alcohol. They are also employed to hold maturing beverages such as wine, cognac, armagnac, sherry, port, whiskey, beer, arrack, and sake. Other commodities once stored in wooden casks include gunpowder, meat, fish, paint, honey, nails, and tallow.

Modern wooden barrels for wine-making are made of English oak (Quercus robur), white oak (Quercus petraea), American white oak (Quercus alba), more exotic is mizunara oak (Quercus crispula), and recently Oregon oak (Quercus garryana) has been used. Someone who makes traditional wooden barrels is called a cooper. Today, barrels and casks can also be made of aluminum, stainless steel, and different types of plastic, such as HDPE.

Early casks were bound with wooden hoops and in the 19th century these were gradually replaced by metal hoops that were stronger, more durable and took up less space.

Barrel has also been used as a standard size of measure, referring to a set capacity or weight of a given commodity. For example, in the UK and Ireland, a barrel of beer refers to a quantity of 36 imperial gallons (160 L; 43 US gal), and is distinguished from other unit measurements, such as firkins, hogsheads, and kilderkins. Wine was shipped in barrels of 119 litres (31 US gal; 26 imp gal). A barrel of oil, defined as 42 US gallons (35 imp gal; 160 L), is still used as a measure of volume for oil, although oil is no longer shipped in that kind of container. Barrel has also come into use as a generic term for a wooden cask of any size.

== History ==
An Egyptian wall-painting in the tomb of Hesy-Ra, dating to 2600 BC, shows a wooden tub used to measure wheat and constructed of staves bound together with wooden hoops. Another Egyptian tomb painting dating to 1900 BC shows a cooper and tubs made of staves in use at the grape harvest. Herodotus (c. 484 – c. 425 BC) allegedly reports the use of "palm-wood casks" in ancient Babylon, but some modern scholarship disputes this interpretation.

In Europe, buckets and casks dating to 200 BC have been found preserved in the mud of lake villages. A lake village near Glastonbury dating to the late Iron Age has yielded one complete tub and a number of wooden staves.

The Roman historian Pliny the Elder (died 79 AD) reported that cooperage in Europe originated with the Gauls in Alpine villages who stored their beverages in wooden casks bound with hoops. Pliny identified three different types of coopers: ordinary coopers, wine coopers and coopers who made large casks. Large casks contain more and bigger staves and are correspondingly more difficult to assemble. Roman coopers tended to be independent tradesmen, passing their skills on to their sons. The Greek geographer Strabo (c. 64 BC – c. 24 AD) recorded that wooden pithoi (barrels) were lined with pitch to stop leakage and preserve the wine.

Barrels were sometimes used for military purposes. Julius Caesar (100 to 44 BC) used catapults to hurl burning barrels of tar into besieged towns to start fires. The Romans also used empty barrels to make pontoon bridges to cross rivers.

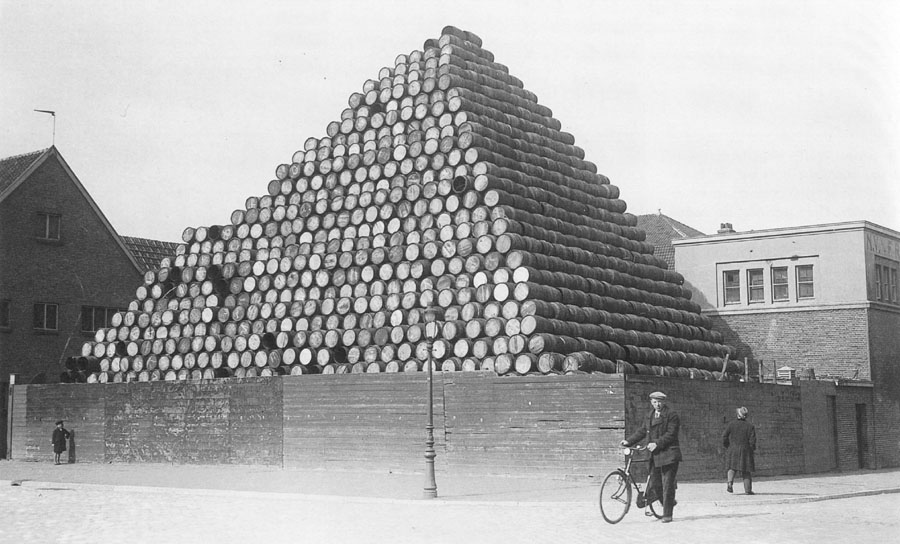
Pyramidal pile of herring barrels in Scheveningen, the Netherlands, c. 1940

Empty casks were used to line the walls of shallow wells from at least Roman times. Such casks were found in 1897 during archaeological excavations of Roman Silchester in Britain. They were made of Pyrenean silver fir and the staves were 38 mm (1.5 in) thick and featured grooves where the heads fitted. They had Roman numerals scratched on the surface of each stave to help with re-assembly.

In Anglo-Saxon Britain, wooden barrels were used to store ale, butter, honey and mead. Drinking-containers were also made from small staves of oak, yew or pine. These items required considerable craftsmanship to hold liquids and might be bound with finely-worked precious metals. They were highly valued items and were sometimes buried with the dead as grave goods.

In medieval and early modern Northern Europe, wooden casks were the primary container for wet and dry cargoes carried by ships, akin to the ceramic amphora transport jars used from antiquity in the Mediterranean region. Wooden barrels carried foodstuffs such as fish, beer, honey, butter, apples, raisins, nuts, malt, beans, peas, grain, barley, and oats. Gunpowder, iron, tar, coals, potash, lime, vinegar, and candles were transported in barrels; and no doubt much more. As with amphoras, different production centers applied various volumetric standards to the casks. This was enforced in some places by using sophisticated methods of gauging the casks, and then certifying the standard by municipal seals. In other places, such as the Hanseatic League town of Rostock, barrel volume was determined by the number of dressed and salted herring packed into them. Some Hanse traders enforced their standards by destroying casks that did not conform. Standardized cask volume was therefore an indicator of political economy.

== Uses today ==
=== Beverage maturing ===
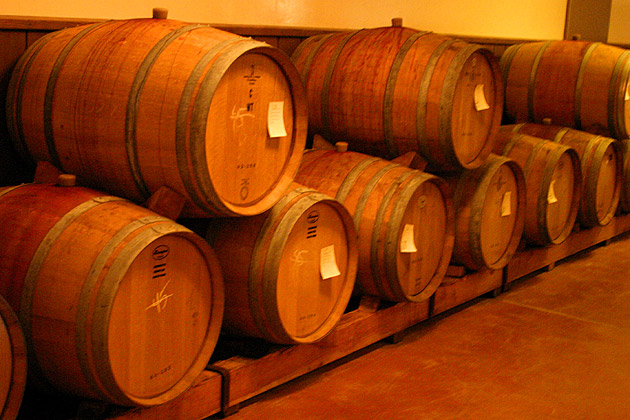
Wine barrels in Napa Valley, California, US

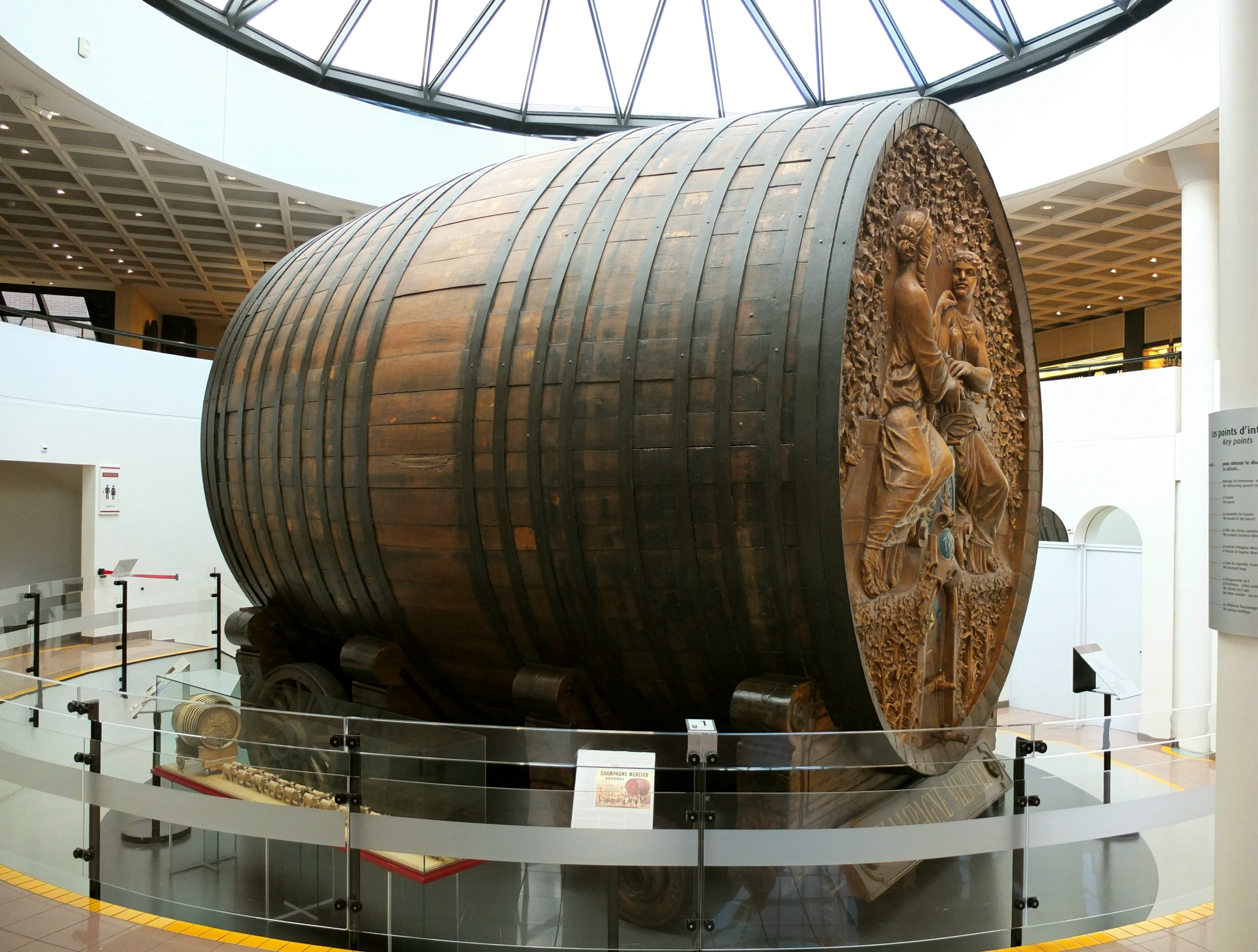
This Mercier oak barrel with a capacity of 200,000 Champagne bottles was created for the 1889 world exposition in Paris.

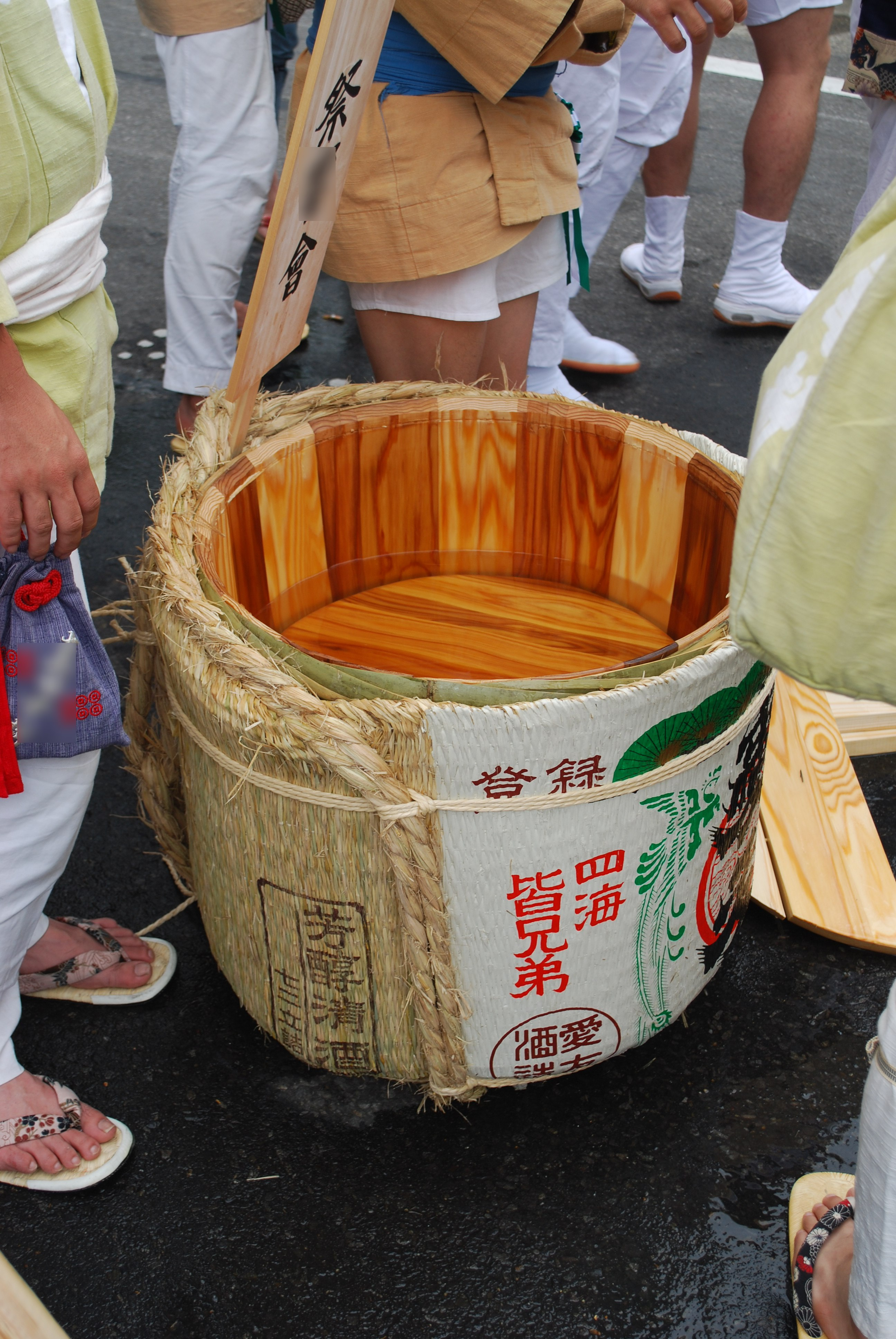
Opened Japanese Sake barrel for move

An "ageing barrel" is used to age wine; distilled spirits such as whiskey, brandy, or rum; beer; tabasco sauce; or (in smaller sizes) traditional balsamic vinegar. When a wine or spirit ages in a barrel, small amounts of oxygen are introduced as the barrel lets some air in (compare to microoxygenation where oxygen is deliberately added). Oxygen enters a barrel when water or alcohol is lost due to evaporation, a portion known as the "angels' share". In an environment with 100% relative humidity, very little water evaporates and so most of the loss is alcohol, a useful trick if one has a wine with very high proof. Most beverages are topped up from other barrels to prevent significant oxidation, although others such as vin jaune and sherry are not.

Beverages aged in wooden barrels take on some of the compounds in the barrel, such as vanillin and wood tannins. The presence of these compounds depends on many factors, including the place of origin, how the staves were cut and dried, and the degree of "toast" applied during manufacture. Barrels used for aging are typically made of French or American oak, but chestnut and redwood are also used. Some Asian beverages (e.g., Japanese sake) use Japanese cedar, which imparts an unusual, minty-piney flavor. In Peru and Chile, a grape distillate named pisco is either aged in oak or in earthenware.

==== Wines ====
Some wines are fermented "on barrel", as opposed to in a neutral container like steel or wine-grade HDPE (high-density polyethylene) tanks. Wine can also be fermented in large wooden tanks, which—when open to the atmosphere—are called "open-tops". Other wooden cooperage for storing wine or spirits range from smaller barriques to huge casks, with either elliptical or round heads.

The tastes yielded by French and American species of oak are slightly different, with French oak being subtler, while American oak gives stronger aromas. To retain the desired measure of oak influence, a winery will replace a certain percentage of its barrels every year, although this can vary from 5 to 100%. Some winemakers use "200% new oak", where the wine is put into new oak barrels twice during the aging process. Bulk wines are sometimes more cheaply flavored by soaking in oak chips or added commercial oak flavoring instead of being aged in a barrel because of the much lower cost.

===== Sherry =====
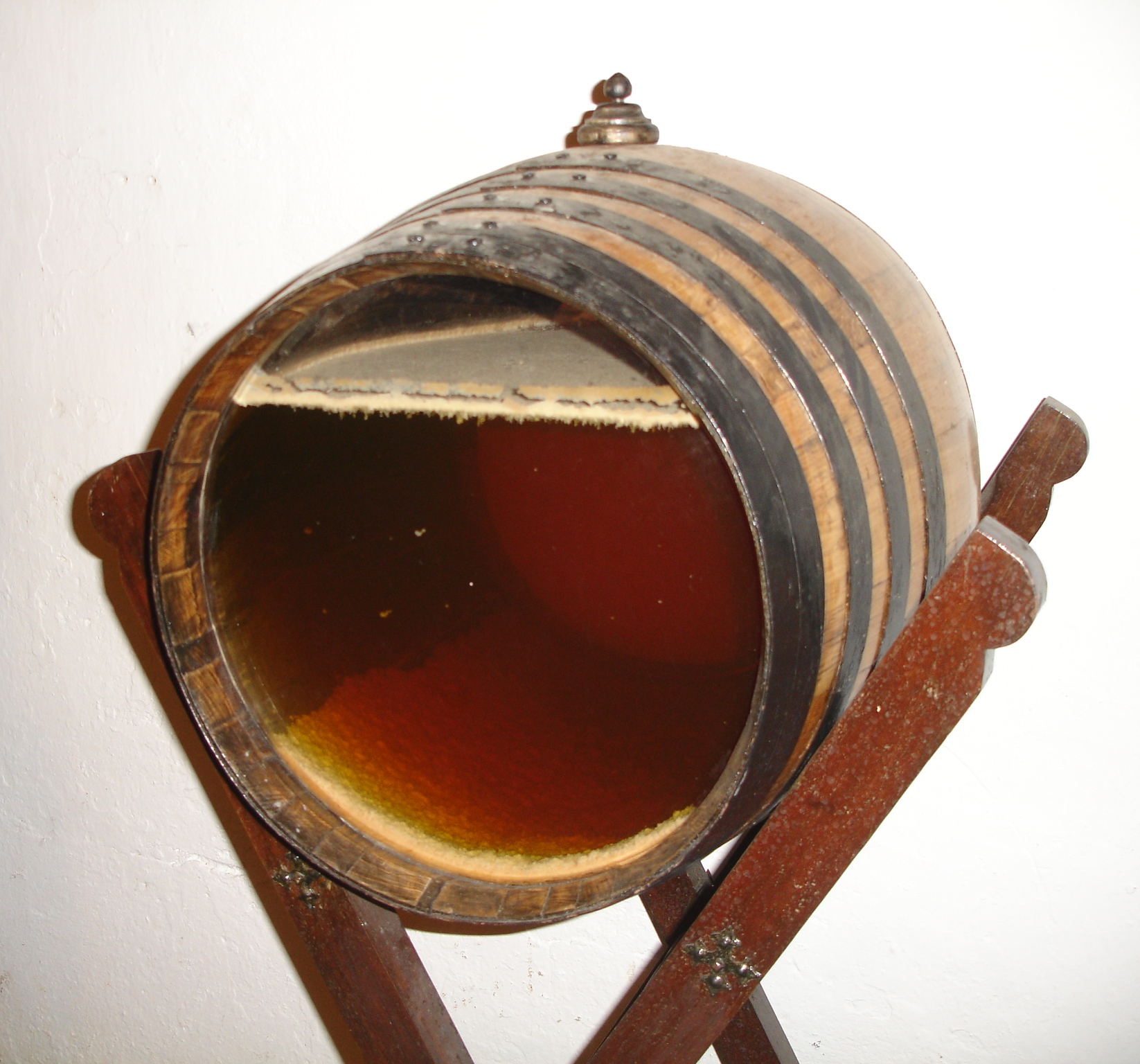
Sherry barrel with glass barrel head to show the layer of flor floating atop the aging wine

Sherry is stored in 600-litre (130 imp gal; 160 US gal) casks made of North American oak, which is slightly more porous than French or Spanish oak. The casks, or butts, are filled five-sixths full, leaving "the space of two fists" empty at the top to allow flor to develop on top of the wine. Sherry is also commonly swapped between barrels of different ages, a process that is known as solera.

==== Spirits ====
===== Whiskey =====
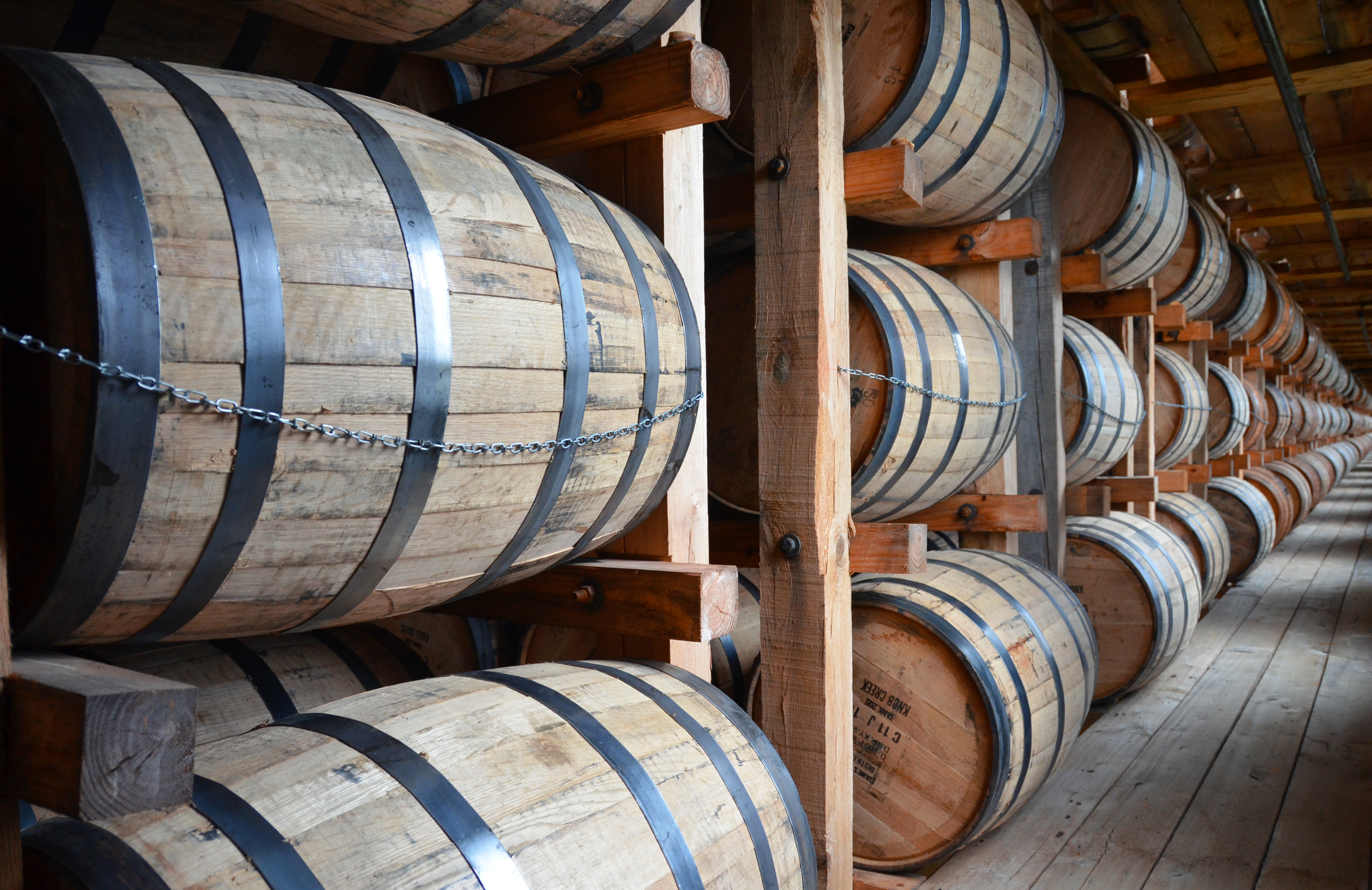
Charred white oak barrels are filled with new bourbon whiskey and resting in a rack house for a period of typically 4 to 9 years (for good-quality bourbon), with the char giving the bourbon its characteristic copper color.

Laws in several jurisdictions require that whiskey be aged in wooden barrels. The law in the United States requires that "straight whiskey" (with the exception of corn whiskey) must be stored for at least two years in new, charred oak containers. Other forms of whiskey aged in used barrels cannot be called "straight".

International laws require any whisky bearing the label "Scotch" to be distilled and matured in Scotland for a minimum of three years and one day in oak casks.

By Canadian law, Canadian whiskies must "be aged in small wood for not less than three years", and "small wood" is defined as a wood barrel not exceeding 700 litres (150 imp gal; 180 US gal) capacity.

Since US law requires the use of new barrels for several popular types of whiskey, which is not typically considered necessary elsewhere, whiskey made elsewhere is usually aged in used barrels that previously contained American whiskey (usually bourbon whiskey). The typical bourbon barrel is 53 US gallons (200 L; 44 imp gal) in size, which is thus the de facto standard whiskey barrel size worldwide. Some distillers transfer their whiskey into different barrels to "finish" or add qualities to the final product. These finishing barrels frequently aged a different spirit (such as rum) or wine. Other distillers, particularly those producing Scotch, often disassemble five used bourbon barrels and reassemble them into four casks with different barrel ends for aging Scotch, creating a type of cask referred to as a hogshead.

===== Brandy =====
Maturing is very important for a good brandy, which is typically aged in oak casks. The wood used for those barrels is selected because of its ability to transfer certain aromas to the spirit. Cognac is aged only in oak casks made from wood from the Forest of Tronçais and more often from the Limousin forests.

===== Tequila =====
Some types of tequila are aged in oak barrels to mellow its flavor. "Reposado" tequila is aged for a period of two months to one year, "Añejo" tequila is aged for up to three years, and "Extra Añejo" tequila is aged for at least three years. Like with other spirits, longer aging results in a more pronounced flavor.

==== Beer ====
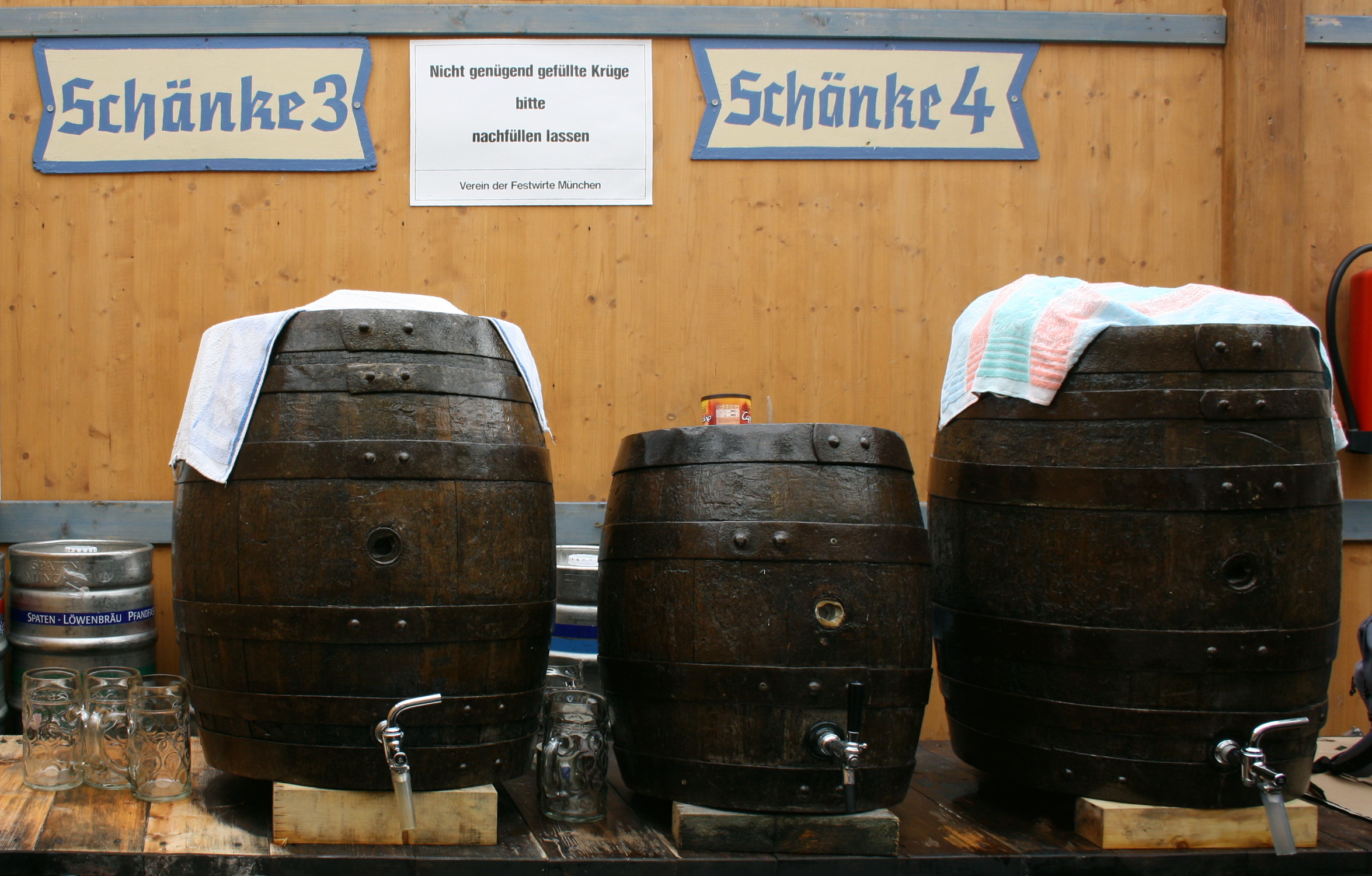
Beer barrels at the Munich Oktoberfest

Beers are sometimes aged in barrels which were previously used for maturing wines or spirits. This is most common in darker beers such as stout, which is sometimes aged in oak barrels identical to those used for whiskey. Whisky distiller Jameson notably purchases barrels used by Franciscan Well brewery for their Shandon Stout to produce a whisky branded as "Jameson Caskmates". Cask ale is aged in the barrel (usually steel) for a short time before serving. Extensive barrel aging is required of many sour beers.

==== Condiments ====
===== Balsamic vinegar =====
Traditional balsamic vinegar is aged in a series of wooden barrels.

===== Tabasco sauce =====
The pepper mash used to make Tabasco sauce is aged for three years in previously used oak whiskey barrels since its invention in 1868.

==== Soft drinks ====
Vernors ginger ale is marketed as having a "barrel-aged" flavor, and the syrup used to produce the beverage was originally aged in oak barrels when first manufactured in the 19th century. Whether the syrup continues to be aged in oak is unclear.

==== Angels' share ====
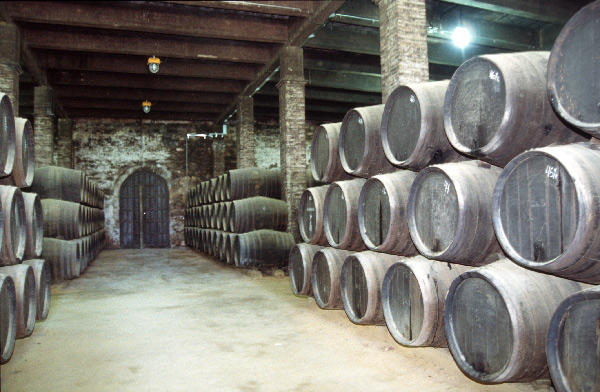
The angels' share in the sherry aging produces fungus on the walls.

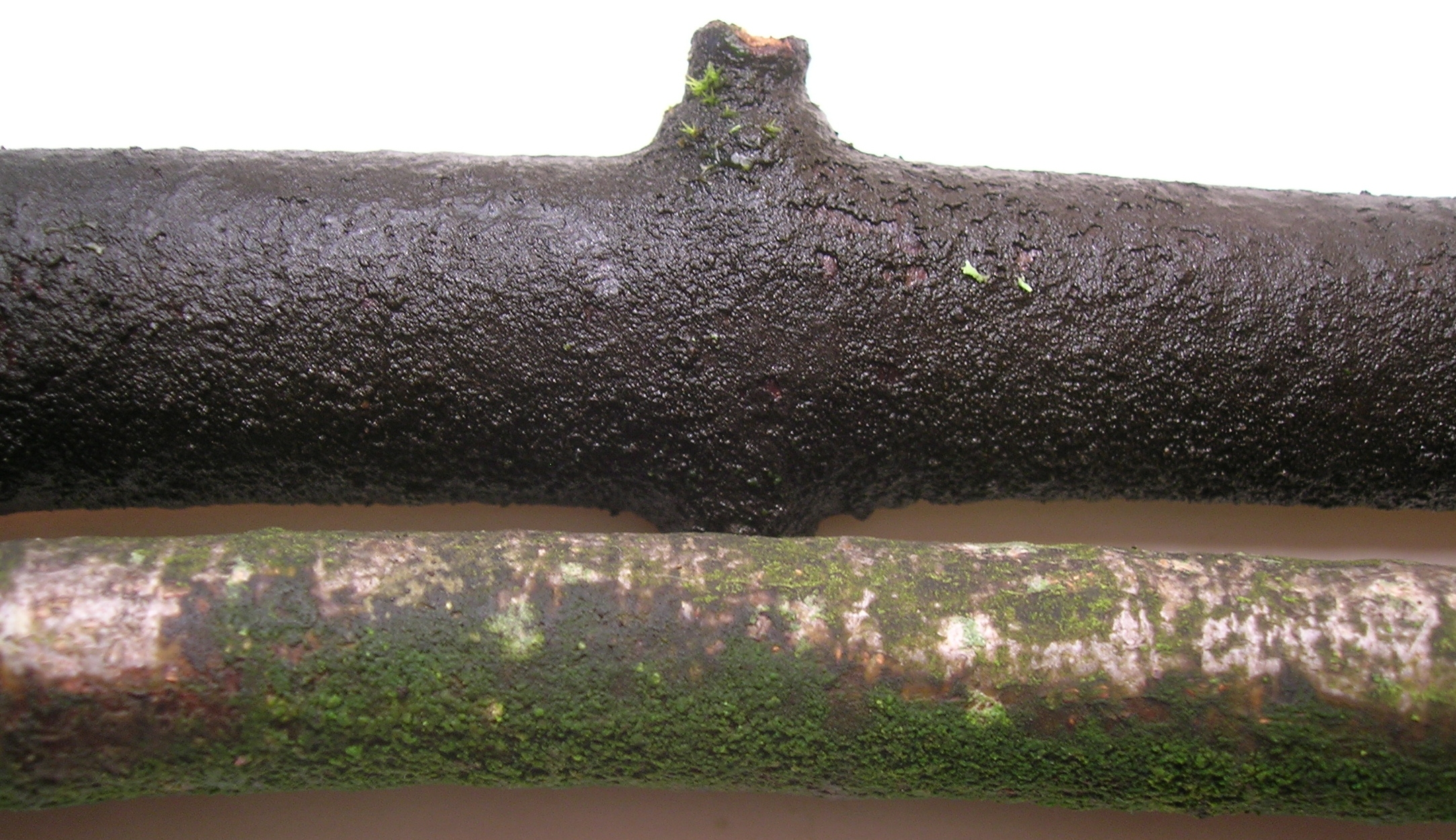
The angels' share fungus, Baudoinia compniacensis on bark, top, with an unaffected sample below

"Angels' share" is a term for the portion (share) of a wine or distilled spirit's volume that is lost to evaporation during aging in oak barrels. The ambient humidity tends to affect the composition of this share. Drier conditions tend to make the barrels evaporate more water, strengthening the spirit. However, in higher humidities, more alcohol than water will evaporate, therefore reducing the alcoholic strength of the product. This alcoholic evaporate encourages the growth of a darkly colored fungus, the angels' share fungus, Baudoinia compniacensis, which tends to appear on the exterior surfaces of most things in the immediate area.

=== Water storage ===
Water barrels are often used to collect the rainwater from dwellings (so that it may be used for irrigation or other purposes). This usage, known as rainwater harvesting, requires (besides a large rainwater barrel or water butt) adequate (waterproof) roof-covering and an adequate rain pipe.

=== Oil storage ===
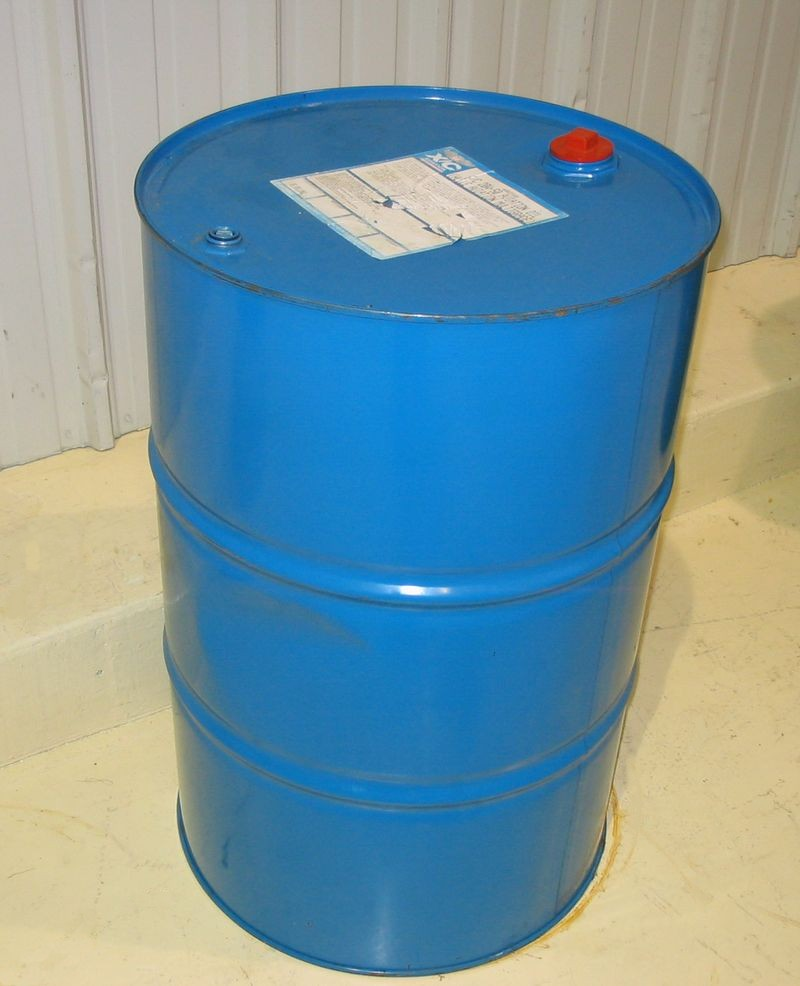
Blue 55-US gallon (44 imp gal, 200 L) barrel (drum)

Wooden casks of various sizes were used to store whale oil on ships in the Age of Sail. Its viscous nature made sperm whale oil a particularly difficult substance to contain in staved containers. Oil coopers were probably the most skilled coopers in pre-industrial cooperage. Olive oil, seed oils and other organic oils were also placed in wooden casks for storage or transport.

Wooden casks were also used to store mineral oil. The standard size barrel of crude oil or other petroleum product (abbreviated bbl) is 42 US gallons (35.0 imp gal; 159.0 L). This measurement originated in the early Pennsylvania oil fields, and permitted both British and American merchants to refer to the same unit, based on the old English wine measure, the tierce.

Earlier, another size of whiskey barrel was the most common size; this was the 40 US gallons (33.3 imp gal; 151.4 L) barrel for proof spirits, which was of the same volume as five US bushels. However, by 1866, the oil barrel was standardized at 42 US gallons.

Oil has not been shipped in barrels since the introduction of oil tankers, but the 42 US gallon size is still used as a unit of measurement for pricing and tax and regulatory codes. Each barrel is refined into about 20 US gallons (17 imp gal; 76 L) of gasoline, the rest becoming other products such as jet fuel and heating oil, using fractional distillation.

== Barrel shape, construction and parts ==
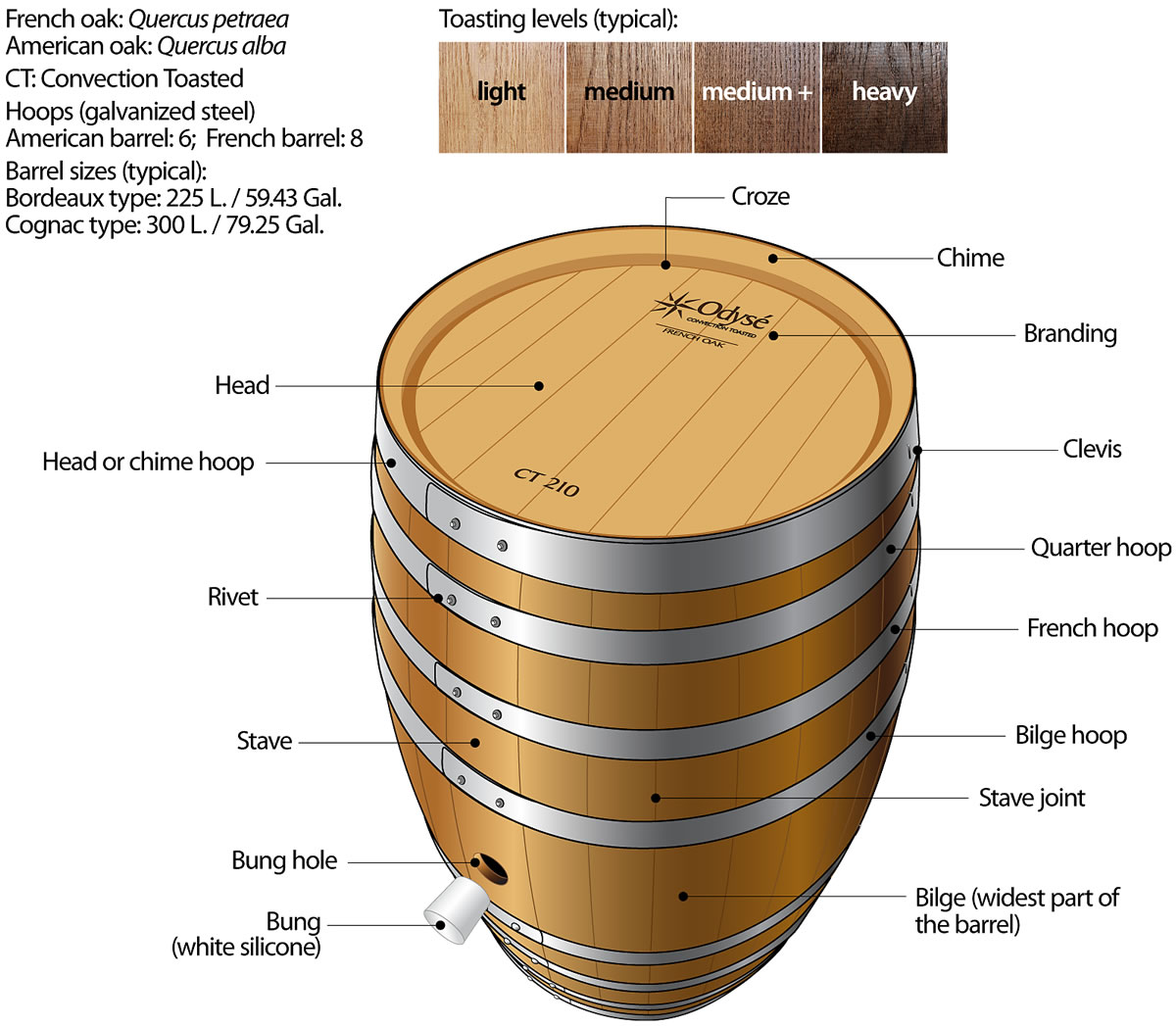
Wine barrel parts

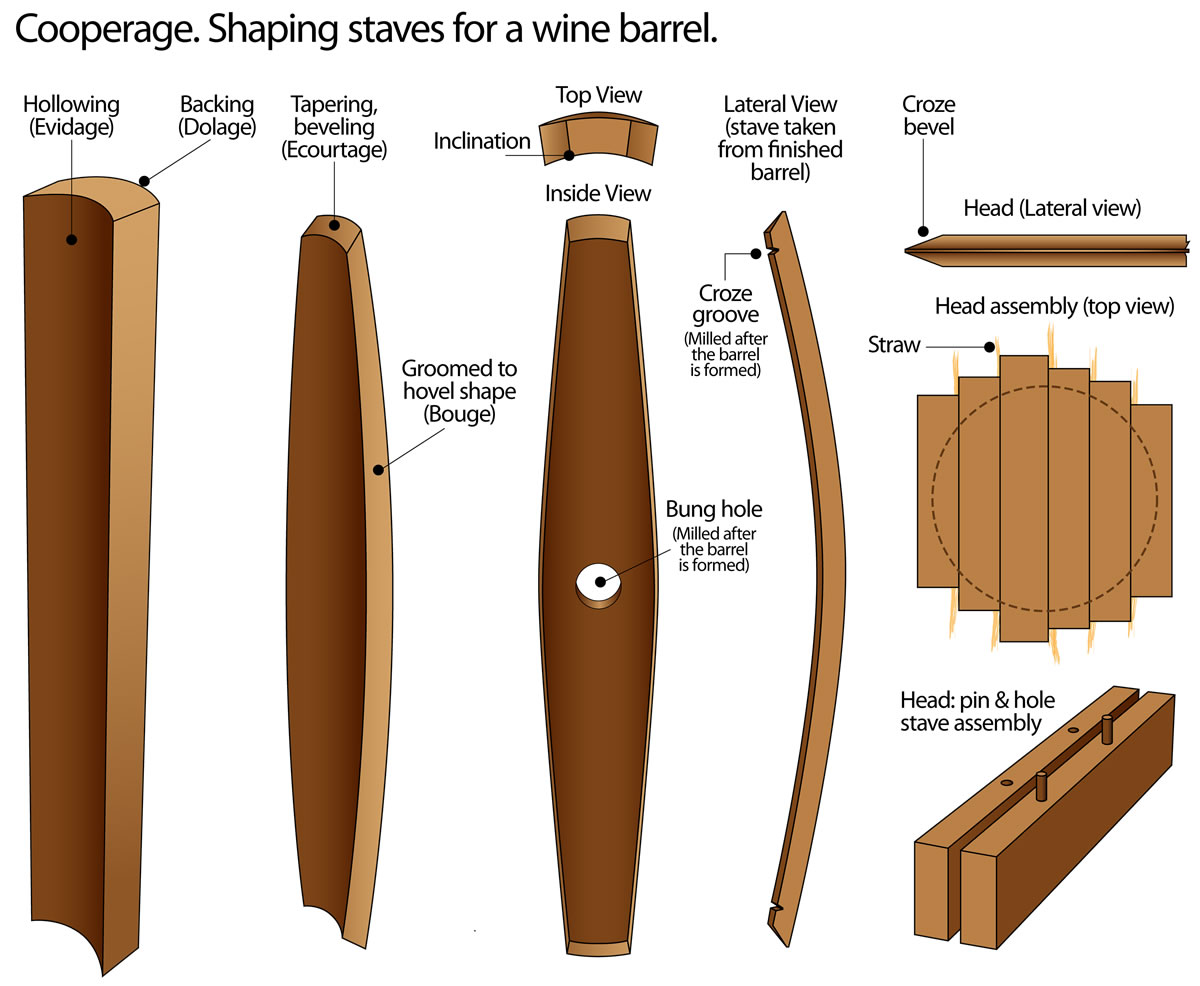
Shaping barrel staves

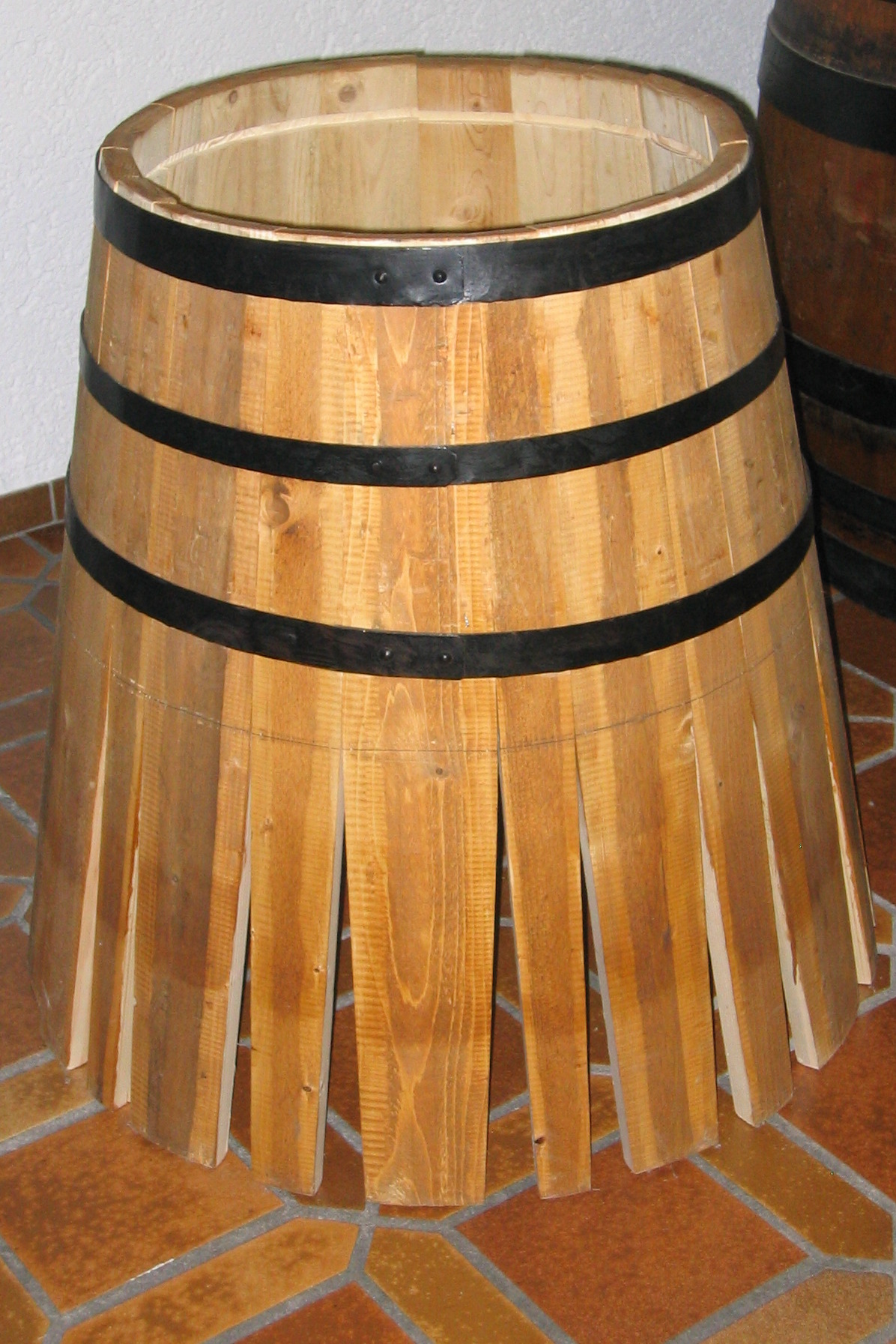
A half-completed beer barrel; in wine barrel cooperage this set-up is called "mise en rose".

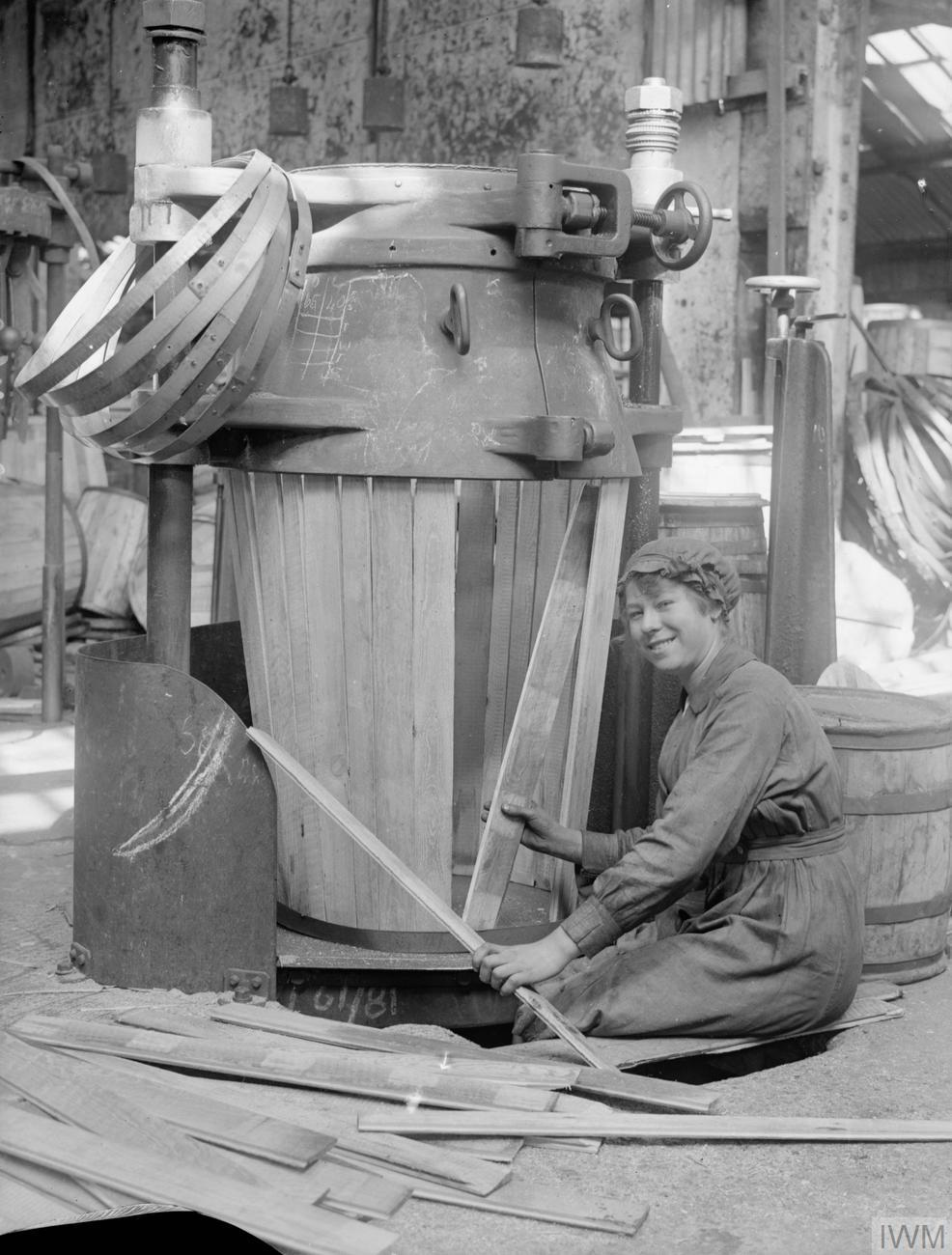
A cooper making a cask at a chemical works in England, September 1918

Barrels have a convex shape and bulge at their center, called bilge. This facilitates rolling a well-built wooden barrel on its side and allows the roller to change directions with little friction, compared to a cylinder. It also helps to distribute stress evenly in the material by making the container more curved. Barrels have reinforced edges to enable safe displacement by rolling them at an angle (in addition to rolling on their sides as described).

Casks used for ale or beer have shives and keystones in their openings. Before serving the beer, a spile is hammered into the shive and a tap into the keystone.

The wooden parts that make up a barrel are called staves, the top and bottom are both called heads or headers, and the rings that hold the staves together are called hoops. These are usually made of galvanized iron, though historically they were made of flexible bits of wood called withies. While wooden hoops could require barrels to be "fully hooped", with hoops stacked tightly together along the entire top and bottom third of a barrel, iron-hooped barrels only require a few hoops on each end.

Wine barrels typically come in two hoop configurations. An American barrel features six hoops, from top to center: head- or chime hoop, quarter hoop and bilge hoop (times two), while a French barrel features eight, including a so-called French hoop, located between the quarter- and bilge hoops (see "wine barrel parts" illustration).

The opening at the center of a barrel is called a bunghole and the stopper used to seal it is a bung. The latter is generally made of white silicone.

== Sizes ==
A barrel is one of several units of volume, with dry barrels, fluid barrels (UK beer barrel, US beer barrel), oil barrel, etc. The volume of some barrel units is double others, with various volumes in the range of about 100–200 litres (22–44 imp gal; 26–53 US gal).

=== English wine casks ===
English wine cask units
gallon	rundlet	barrel	tierce	hogshead	puncheon, tertian	pipe, butt	tun	
							1	tun
						1	2	pipes, butts
					1	1 1/2	3	puncheons, tertians
				1	1 1/3	2	4	hogsheads
			1	1 1/2	2	3	6	tierces
		1	1 1/3	2	2 2/3	4	8	barrels
	1	1 3/4	2 1/3	3 1/2	4 2/3	7	14	rundlets
1	18	31 1/2	42	63	84	126	252	gallons (wine)
3.785	68.14	119.24	158.99	238.48	317.97	476.96	953.92	litres
1	15	26 1/4	35	52 1/2	70	105	210	gallons (imperial)
4.546	68.19	119.3	159.1	238.7	318.2	477.3	954.7	litres

The pre-1824 wine gallon continues to be used in the US, with 231 cubic inches being the standard gallon for liquids. In Britain and its colonies, the wine gallon was replaced by the imperial gallon in 1826. The tierce later became the petrol barrel.

The tun was originally 256 gallons, which explains the origin of the quarter, 8 bushels or 64 (wine) gallons.

=== Brewery casks ===
English brewery cask units
gallon	firkin	kilderkin	barrel	hogshead		Year designated
				1	hogsheads	
			1	1 1/2	barrels	
		1	2	3	kilderkins	
	1	2	4	6	firkins	
1	8	16	32	48	ale gallons	(1454)
= 4.621 L	= 36.97 L	= 73.94 L	= 147.9 L	= 221.8 L	ale gallons	(1454)
1	9	18	36	54	beer gallons	(1454)
= 4.621 L	= 41.59 L	= 83.18 L	= 166.4 L	= 249.5 L	beer gallons	(1454)
1	8 1/2	17	34	51	ale gallons	1688
= 4.621 L	= 39.28 L	= 78.56 L	= 157.1 L	= 235.7 L	ale gallons	1688
1	9	18	36	54	ale gallons	1803
= 4.621 L	= 41.59 L	= 83.18 L	= 166.4 L	= 249.5 L	ale gallons	1803
1	9	18	36	54	imperial gallons	1824
= 4.546 L	= 40.91 L	= 81.83 L	= 163.7 L	= 245.5 L	imperial gallons	1824

Although it is common to refer to draught beer containers of any size as barrels, in the UK this is strictly correct only if the container holds 36 imperial gallons. The terms "keg" and "cask" refer to containers of any size, the distinction being that kegs are used for beers intended to be served using external gas cylinders. Cask ales undergo part of their fermentation process in their containers, called casks.

Casks are available in several sizes, and it is common to refer to "a firkin" or "a kil" (kilderkin) instead of a cask.

The modern US beer barrel is 31 US gallons (117.34777 L), half a gallon less than the traditional wine barrel (26 U.S.C. §5051).

=== Dry goods ===
Barrels are also used as a unit of measurement for dry goods (dry groceries), such as flour or produce. Traditionally, a barrel is 196 pounds (89 kg) of flour (wheat or rye), with other substances such as pork subject to more local variation. In modern times, produce barrels for all dry goods, excepting cranberries, contain 7,056 cubic inches, about 115.627 L.

In the northeastern United States, nails, bolts, and plumbing fittings were commonly shipped in small rough barrels. These were small, 18 inches high by about 10–12 inches in diameter. The wood was the quality of pallet lumber. The binding was sometimes by wire or metal hoops or both. This practice seems to have been prevalent up till the 1980s. Older hardware stores probably still have some of these barrels.

== See also ==
- Bankruptcy barrel
- Barrel racing
- Barrel (unit)
- Box wine
- Cooper (profession)
- Drum (container)
- Drum handler
- Drunkard's cloak
- Hogshead
- Hoop rolling
- Oak (wine)
- Real ale
- Storage tank
- Tierce (unit)
- Worshipful Company of Coopers
