= Bunghole =

Pluggable hole in a container

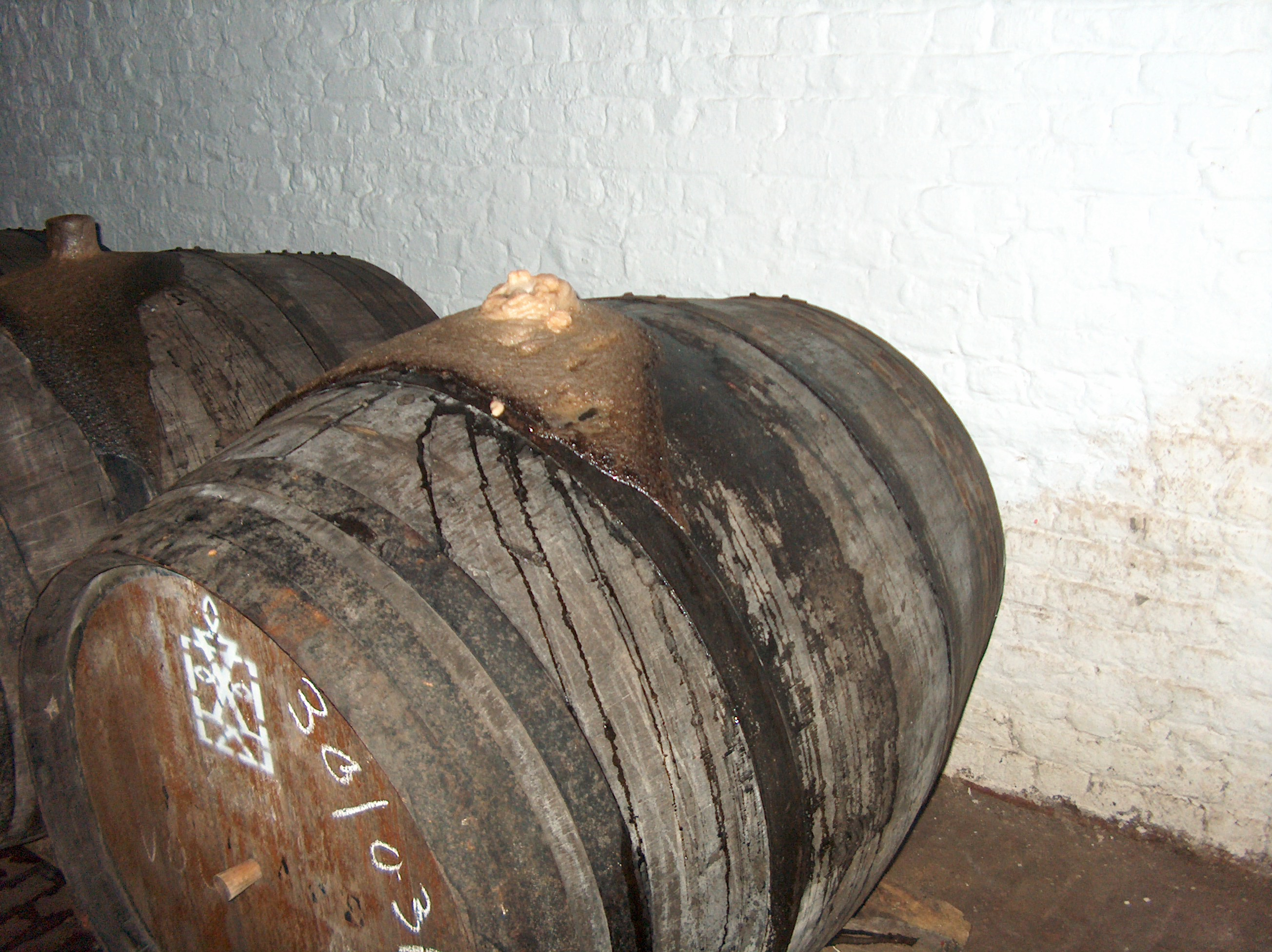
Beer foam on the bunghole of a barrel in a brewery.

A bunghole is a hole bored in a liquid-tight barrel to remove contents. The hole is capped with a cork or cork-like stopper called a bung. Acceptable usage includes other access points that may be capped with alternate materials providing an air- or water-tight access to other vessels. For example, a bunghole on a combustion chamber can be used to remove slag or add coal. Bungholes can also be utilized to insert and remove sensing probes or equipment like mixers to agitate the contents within a vessel.

== History and usage ==
Bungholes were first used on wooden barrels, and were typically bored by the purchaser of the barrel using a brace and bit. Bungholes can be bored in either head (end) of a barrel or in one of the staves (side). With the bung removed, a tapered faucet can be attached to aid with dispensing. When barrels full of a commodity were shipped, the recipient would often bore new bungholes of the most suitable size and placement rather than remove the existing bung. Wooden barrels manufactured by specialty firms today usually are bored by the maker with suitable bungholes, since the hobbyists who purchase them for the making of beer, wine, and fermented foods often do not have a suitable brace and bit.

Closed-head steel barrels and drums now used for shipment of chemicals and petroleum products have a standardized bunghole arrangement, with one 2 inch NPT and one 3/4 inch NPT threaded bunghole on opposite sides of the top head. Some steel barrels are also equipped with a 2-inch threaded bunghole on the side.

== In literature ==
A notable use of the term occurs in Shakespeare's tragedy Hamlet: While holding the skull of the dead court jester, Hamlet wonders:

To what base uses we may return Horatio. Why, may not imagination trace the noble dust of Alexander, till he find it stopping a bunghole? … Alexander died, Alexander was buried, Alexander returneth into dust, the dust is earth, of earth we make loam, and why of that loam (whereto he was converted) might they not stop a beer barrel? — Hamlet, act V, scene 1

== Slang usage ==
Usage of the term as a slang word for the anus dates back to at least the 17th century, as shown in Thomas Urquhart's translation of Gargantua by François Rabelais, first published in 1653. "... I say and maintain, that of all torcheculs, arsewisps, bumfodders, tail-napkins, bunghole cleansers, and wipe-breeches, there is none in the world comparable to the neck of a goose ..."

=== In popular culture ===
- The word was popularized in the MTV cartoon series Beavis and Butt-Head, where the term "bunghole" is used as both a personal insult and slang for anus. In his Cornholio persona, Beavis says, "I need TP [toilet paper] for my bunghole."

=== In the meat industry ===
Bung dropper is a device inserted into the rectum of a slaughtered animal, mostly of a pig, to separate it from carcass during the dressing process.

== See also ==
- Tundish
- Scuttlebutt
- Spile
