= Real ale =

Traditionally made and served beer

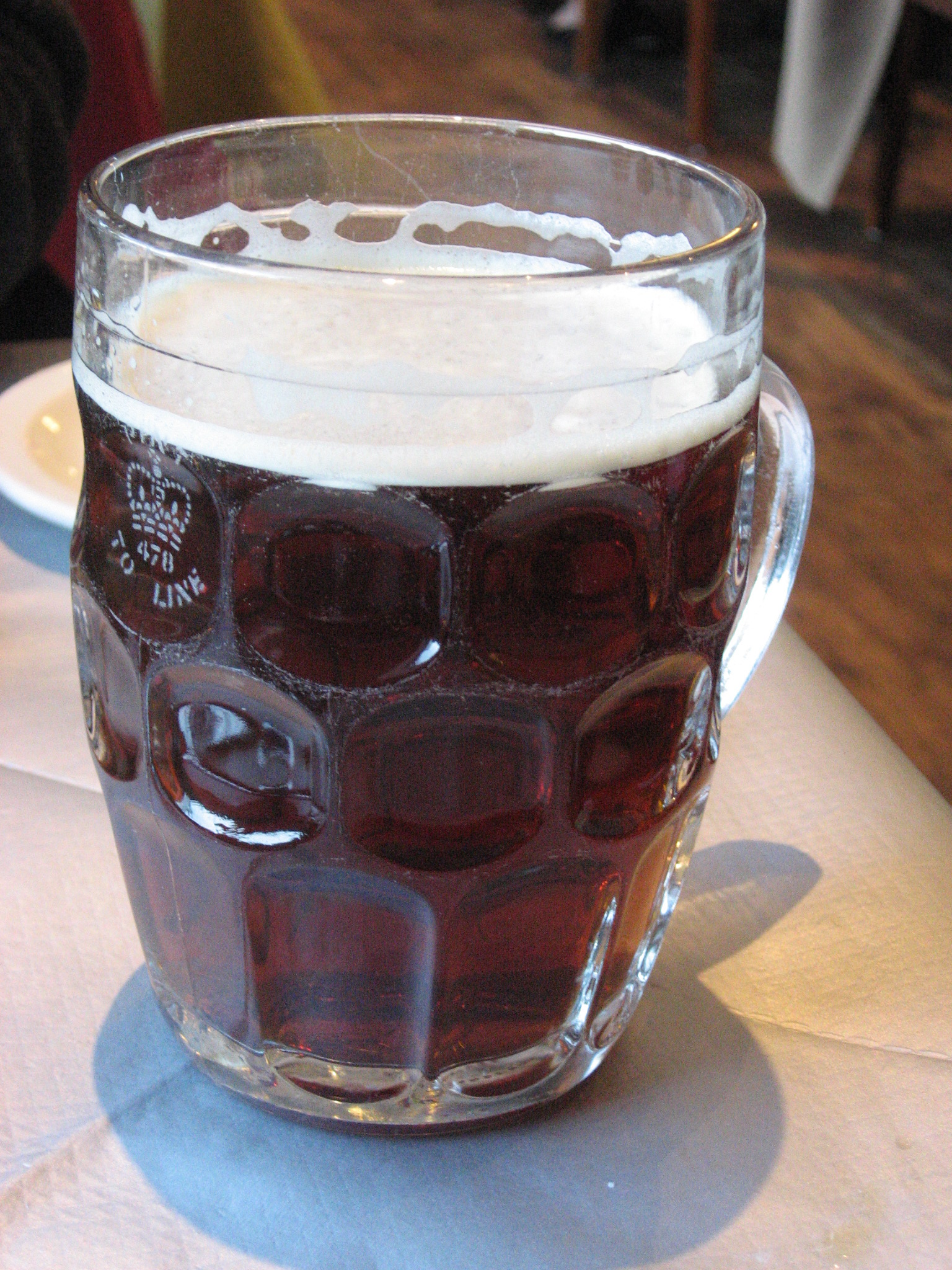
A pint of real ale

Real ale is the name coined by the Campaign for Real Ale (CAMRA) for ale that is "brewed from traditional ingredients, matured by secondary fermentation in the container from which it is dispensed, and served without the use of extraneous carbon dioxide".

== Cask and bottle-conditioned beers ==
Cask and bottle-conditioned beers are referred to as real ale by CAMRA, as both fit its description of beers served from a container in which they have undergone secondary fermentation.

== Distinction from filtered beer ==
The fundamental distinction between real and other ales is that real ale is unfiltered and unpasteurized, leaving its yeast alive and slowly fermenting in bottle or keg. This secondary fermentation continues until the ale is served, allowing it to retain its natural carbonation. In contrast, natural carbonation is removed from standard beer and ale during filtering, requiring them to be artificially re-carbonated.

Real ales are served "bottle conditioned", gravity direct from the cask, or hand pumped. No external pressurization is used. Electric pumps are occasionally seen, especially in the Midlands and Scotland. Water pumps, powered by mains water pressure, were the traditional means of dispensing draught beer in Scotland but this method is discontinued.

== Cask breather ==
A cask breather adds low pressure carbon dioxide into the cask to replace the beer as it is drawn off, preventing the admission of ambient air containing oxygen and nitrogen, forestalling spoilage, and thereby extending the beer's saleable life. It does not pressurize the beer like typical of keg beer.

Before 2018, CAMRA refused to regard a cask ale kept "fresh" by cask breather as real ale. In 2018, this policy was changed, allowing pubs using cask breathers to be listed in the Good Beer Guide.

== CAMRA ==
The term "real ale" was coined by CAMRA in the 1970s to attract media attention in the U.K. to naturally fermented and served ales at a time when there were very few independent breweries left and most production had gone over to filtered and pasteurised "filtered ales" – "keg beer" – served under carbon dioxide pressure.

== Popularity ==
Cask conditioned ale remains popular within the UK, particularly in traditional pubs. In 2019, 420 million pints were sold in the UK, 13.5% of total pint sales. Described as 'Britain's National Drink', cask ale's 'Britishness' is an important factor in its promotion and consumption.

== See also ==
- Draught beer
