= Boddingtons Brewery =

Former regional brewery in Manchester, England

Boddingtons
- Type: Brewery
- Industry: Brewing
- Predecessor: Hole, Potter and Harrison
- Founded: 1778
- Founder: Henry Boddington
- Defunct: 2005 (brewery closure)
- Headquarters: Manchester, England
- Products: Beer
- Production output: 250,000 Hectolitres / 6,604,301 Gallons (2012)
- Owner: AB InBev

Boddingtons Brewery was a regional brewery in Manchester, England, which owned pubs throughout the North West. Boddingtons was best known for Boddingtons Bitter (Boddies), a straw-golden, hoppy bitter which was one of the first beers to be packaged in cans containing a widget, giving it a creamy draught-style head.

In the 1990s, the beer was promoted as The Cream of Manchester in a popular advertising campaign credited with raising Manchester's profile. Boddingtons became one of the city's most famous products after Manchester United and Coronation Street.

As from September 2025, J.W. Lees Brewery, Manchester’s oldest brewer, is now the exclusive brewer of Boddingtons Cask Ale which they brew under licence from AB Inbev. The cask version had previously not been brewed since 2012.

Whitbread bought Boddingtons Brewery in 1989 and Boddingtons Bitter received an increased marketing budget and nationwide distribution. Boddingtons achieved its peak market share in 1997 and at the time was exported to over forty countries.

Boddingtons beer brands are now owned by the global brewer Anheuser–Busch InBev, which acquired the Whitbread Beer Company in 2000. Strangeways Brewery closed in 2004 and production of pasteurised (keg and can) Boddingtons was moved to Samlesbury in Lancashire. Production of the cask-conditioned beer moved to Hydes Brewery in Moss Side, Manchester, until it was discontinued in 2012. The beer's association with Manchester has since been revived by JW Lees, who continues to brew the beer in Middleton.

== History ==
=== 1778–1969 ===
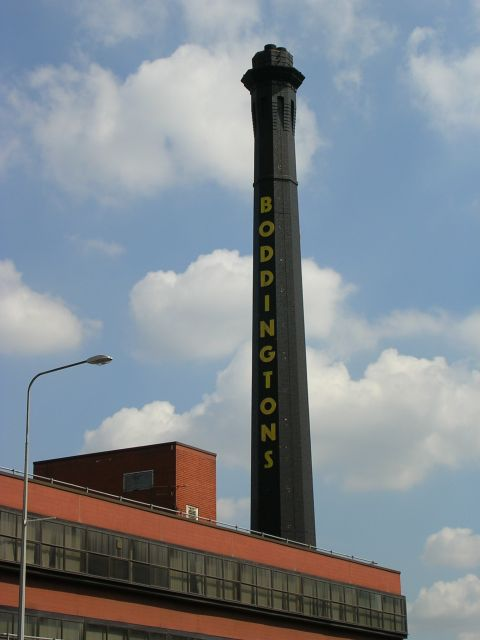
Strangeways Brewery before its demolition in 2007

Strangeways Brewery was founded in 1778 by two-grain merchants, Thomas Caister and Thomas Fry, just north of what is now Manchester city centre. Their principal customers were the cotton workers of Manchester, then a burgeoning mill town.

Henry Boddington, born in 1813 in Thame, Oxfordshire, joined the brewery in 1832 as a travelling salesman when the brewery was in the possession of Hole, Potter and Harrison. Like most Manchester breweries at the time, it was a modestly sized operation. Boddington had become a partner by 1848, alongside John and James Harrison, and by this time the company went under the name John Harrison & Co.

In January 1853, Boddington borrowed money to become its sole owner. Between Boddington's takeover until 1877, the brewery's output increased from 10,000 to 100,000 barrels a year, making it not only Manchester's largest brewery but one of the largest in the North of England, with over 100 tied houses. By 1883 Henry Boddington & Co. was a limited liability company. Henry Boddington's estate was valued at almost £150,000 when he died in 1886.

After Henry Boddington's death, his son, William Slater Boddington became company chairman, and the company went public in 1888 when it was estimated to have assets of £320,465. It was now known as Boddingtons Breweries Ltd.

Its major local competitors were Groves and Whitnall, Threlfalls, and the Manchester Brewing Company. The company owned 212 public houses by 1892, making it the twelfth largest tied estate in the United Kingdom. The tied estate was mostly freehold.

Boddingtons was one of the breweries implicated in the 1900 English beer poisoning epidemic, in which 6,000 people were poisoned by arsenic and 70 died.

In January 1902, 86 per cent of production was of mild ale.

Following the death of W. Slater Boddington in 1908, the family retained an interest in the company and continued to take a practical hand in its running. Henry's youngest son, Robert Slater Boddington (1862–1930) had a fifty-year association with the company and oversaw the installation of a bottling hall in the 1920s.

Robert's third and fourth sons Philip (1893–1952) and Charles (1897–1982) served as joint chairman following the death of their father in 1930, and Charles took sole responsibility after Philip died.

By the 1930s, the Boddington family shareholding had dwindled to around 40 per cent. On 22 December 1940, the brewery water tanks were hit by bombs during the Manchester Blitz, and the brewery had to be closed down for several months, with production moved temporarily to the nearby Hydes Brewery. The brewery was rebuilt with modern equipment of the time, and was the first in Europe to install stainless steel brewing vats.

Pale ale or "bitter" rapidly grew in popularity after the Second World War and overtook mild in sales from the 1950s.

Whitbread, a large brewery, took a 13 per cent stake in the company in 1961. In 1962 the company purchased Richard Clarke & Co of Reddish, Stockport, adding 60 public houses to the firm.

=== Mergers and acquisitions ===
In 1969 the large Allied Breweries combine initiated a hostile takeover bid for Boddingtons, which valued the company at £5 million. Charles Boddington took the unusual step of issuing a spirited defence of the company to the shareholders:

You will be only too aware that present-day pressures bear heavily towards the elimination of individuality and character in many consumer goods. There is an inexorable progression towards the mass-produced nationwide product of standardised quality. You, however, are still, at this moment in time, a shareholder in one of the remaining independent brewery companies whose traditional draught beers have a reputation for quality and individual character beyond the immediate area of the North of England in which we operate ... The takeover of Boddingtons and its consequent elimination can achieve very little. It will do nothing for the national economy, add nothing to the nation's exports, and contribute nothing at all to the quality of life that we are all used to enjoy.

The company's independence was maintained after Whitbread acted as a white knight by raising its stake in the company from 13 to 23 per cent, and the family and many small shareholders refused to sell their stakes. The chairman of Whitbread, Colonel Whitbread, is reputed to have said, "You are a very old firm. You have a very good name. You mustn't go out." At the time, it was rare for a company to win the emotional argument for independence, and it was the first time a regional brewery had headed off an offer from a national company. In 1970, Charles Boddington retired and his son Ewart assumed the directorship.

In 1971, Allied Breweries sold its 35 per cent stake in the company, leaving Whitbread 25 per cent and the Boddington family 10 per cent, with the remainder of company shares held by small shareholders in the Manchester area. That year Guinness Draught stout and Heineken lager were introduced into the tied estate. During the 1970s the company operated within a 70-mile radius of Manchester, and growth was driven by the increasing popularity of its main product, Boddingtons Bitter. The Observer commented in 1974 that Boddingtons cheap pricing and distinctive flavour afforded it an unusually loyal following. In 1981 the same newspaper commented,

what has stood Boddingtons in good stead is the highly distinctive flavour of its brews, especially its bitters. In fact, in the North-West, Boddies is increasingly becoming a sort of cult brew.

In 1982, Boddingtons bought the Oldham Brewery for £23 million, hoping to combine Oldham's strength in lager and keg bitter with their own expertise in cask ales. After the acquisition, the company owned 272 public houses, 70 per cent of which were within 20 miles of its Manchester brewery. In 1983, Boddingtons Bitter was distributed in the Home Counties for the first time. In 1985 Boddingtons paid £27.5 million for the 160,000 barrel capacity Higsons Brewery in Liverpool and its tied estate of 160 public houses to form a combine with a £65 million turnover. The Guardian commented that the company had paid mere asset value for Higsons as the company had been reporting poor profits. There was virtually no overlap between the two companies, and the takeover brought Boddingtons to Merseyside for the first time. By this time Strangeways was producing only two beers, a bitter and a mild, with bitter constituting over 90 per cent of production. In 1986, the company employed 280 people and operated 530 tied houses, and while Strangeways Brewery had a capacity of 500,000 barrels a year, it was operating at around 50 per cent capacity. That year the company introduced its own lager, brewing Kaltenberg under licence.

In 1987, the company rejected a £270 million reverse takeover bid by Midsummer Leisure. By this time Boddingtons had a tied estate of 520 pubs. In 1988, the company closed the Oldham Brewery with the loss of 70 jobs, and shed 140 transport jobs at Higsons and Strangeways by contracting out delivery work to TNT.

Boddingtons remained independent until 1989, when Ewart Boddington sold Strangeways Brewery and the Boddingtons brand (but not the tied estate) to Whitbread for £50.7 million. Whitbread was motivated to plug a gap in its portfolio by owning a credible national cask ale brand. The sale was amicable, with both parties aware that Whitbread capital and distribution could make the Boddingtons brand national, although some Boddington family board members had been resistant to the sale. Boddingtons had been in decline before the Whitbread takeover, and although it retained an almost "cult" following within its Manchester heartland, only 5 per cent of sales were outside the North West.

=== Whitbread era ===
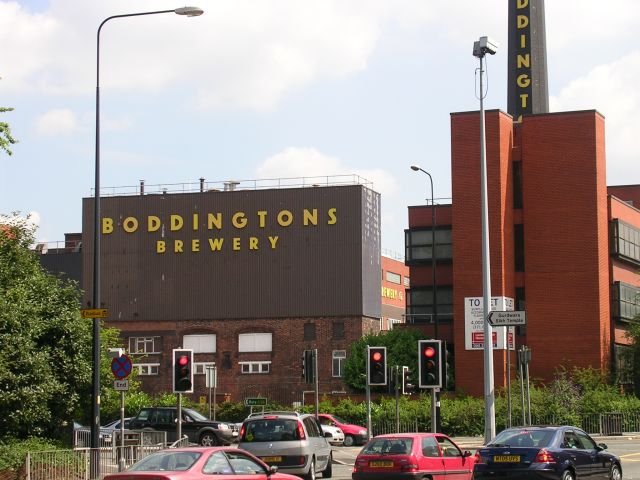
Another view of Strangeways Brewery

Whitbread transformed the brand from regional to national, expanding production from 200,000 to 850,000 barrels a year between 1989 and 1995. By 1993 the cask version was outsold only by Tetley and John Smith's, and the majority of sales were outside of the North West. By 1994 it was the fourth-highest selling bitter brand in the country. The canned variant was distributed nationwide from 1990 and was the highest-selling canned bitter in the UK from 1992 until 2000. The beer was officially exported overseas from 1993, initially to Canada. The rise in sales of the beer coincided with the elevation of Manchester from "city of dark, beaten mills to the cultural magnet of Madchester". Manchester and the North of England were now fashionable in the public consciousness and rejuvenated from industrial slump. Whitbread chief executive Peter Jarvis commented in 1995 that:

It was very fortuitous that the brewery was in Manchester. To outsiders, Manchester is a very attractive place – known the world over for soccer, art, music and broadcasting. It would be difficult to have a Cream of Wolverhampton even though Banks's beer is very good. People do not aspire to visit Wolverhampton. On the whole they try to by-pass it.

Success was attributed to an excellent marketing campaign, and being the first canned ale to be sold with a widget after Guinness. In 1997 Boddingtons sales peaked, and 1998 saw a drop in sales of 10 per cent. Boddingtons had been turned into: "a fashion product ... and as with all fashion products, the drinkers moved on". In 1998 production of the Flowers ale brands was moved to Strangeways. Boddingtons' share of the UK ale market grew to 4.9 per cent in 1998–1999, and sales grew by 7.3 percent during 1999–2000.

Meanwhile, in 1995 the independent owner of the 450-strong former Boddingtons tied estate, The Boddington Group, was taken over by Greenalls.

=== Interbrew takeover ===
In May 2000 the Whitbread Beer Company was acquired by the Belgian brewer Interbrew, which owned Stella Artois. At that time over ten percent of Boddingtons production was exported to 40 countries worldwide, including China, the United States, Taiwan and the West Indies. The Strangeways Brewery kegging facility closed in February 2003 with the loss of 50 jobs. In August 2003, amidst falling sales, Interbrew relaunched the cask product in the North West of England, with an increased strength. The relaunch was unsuccessful and the changes were reversed.

In September 2004 the owners (now known as InBev) announced plans to close the Strangeways Brewery and move most production from Manchester to Magor in South Wales and Samlesbury, Lancashire, with the loss of 60 jobs. Two years earlier the brewery had employed 250 people. Boddingtons cask ale production, which accounted for less than 10 per cent of output, was moved to Hydes Brewery in Moss Side. The closure plan was made despite the company admitting the brewery was profitable but the brewery site had become a valuable property asset and was subsequently sold for £12 million to developers. A spokesman for the firm argued: "[The] building was built in the Victorian times and it is an old historic brewery but it was a victim of its age. It is an inflexible brewery – it can't bottle or can and customer needs have moved on". Production ended in February 2005 and the brewery was demolished in 2007. Bloomberg Businessweek described the move by InBev as "unsentimental".

In May 2010 it was speculated in The Times that InBev (Anheuser-Busch InBev from 2008 onwards) would attempt to sell the Boddingtons brand to another brewer after its failed attempt to sell the UK rights to Bass ale. The newspaper was damning of what it perceived as InBev's mismanagement of the brand, which had "declined under AB InBev's hands. The brand was once a leading part of the old Whitbread Beer Company, but its fortunes had dwindled since the closure in 2005 of the Strangeways Brewery."

In 2010 Boddingtons was the sixth-highest selling bitter in the United Kingdom, although sales had dropped by almost three-quarters since the takeover by Anheuser–Busch InBev in 2000. In July 2011 AB InBev's UK president Stuart MacFarlane claimed "We still believe in the brand" whilst admitting to not advertising the brand for five years, instead reaping the rewards of memories of earlier advertising. Contract brewing of Boddingtons Cask continued until March 2012 when production of the beer ended.

Production was around 250,000 hectolitres in 2012, with around 80 per cent of production destined for the UK market, and around 20 per cent for export markets such as Taiwan, Singapore and the United Arab Emirates.

== Beers ==
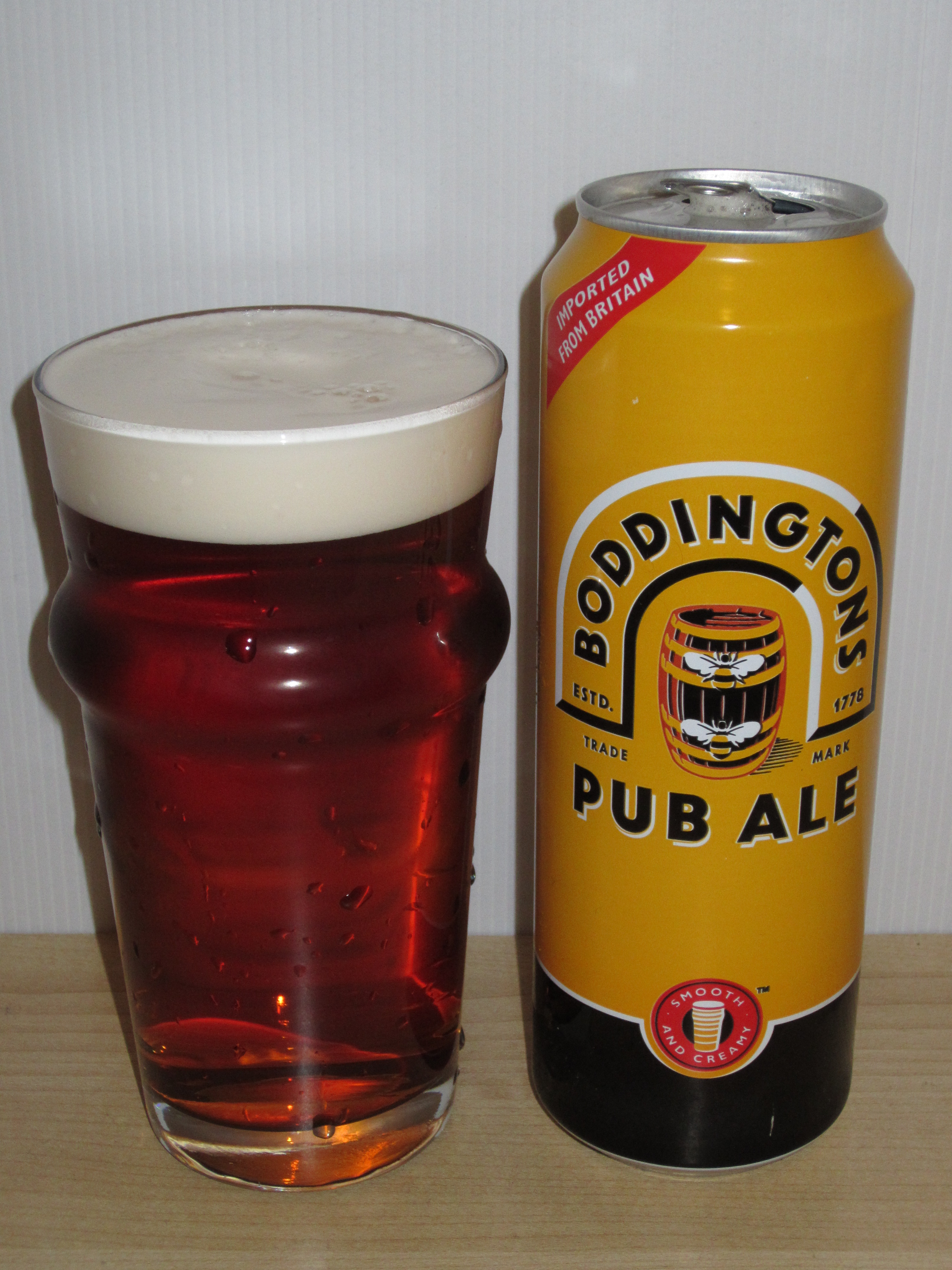
Boddingtons Pub Ale

Boddingtons has a distinctive straw-golden coloured body with a creamy white head, which in its modern form is achieved by the addition of nitrogen when served in a can, in an attempt to replicate the traditional head from serving the cask beer through a sparkler. The cask version of Boddingtons, is still dispensed in the traditional method.

- Boddingtons Cask (4.0% ABV)

Boddingtons newest addition brings cask back to the forefront, brewed by JW Lees under licence from AB Inbev. The beer has a thick white creamy head, as expected from a Boddingtons cask beer, the beer is golden in colour with notes of grapefruit and caramel with a distinctive banana aroma. Boddingtons cask is brewed and distributed by JW Lees Brewery, and the beer is available in pubs across the North West of England and West Yorkshire including a small selection of JW Lees' own pubs.

- Boddingtons Draught Bitter (3.5% ABV)

The nitrogenated and pasteurised variant of the beer available in kegs and cans. It is brewed in Samlesbury. The canned variant, launched in 1991, contains a widget to give the beer a creamy white head. The beer's ABV was reduced from 3.8% to 3.5% in late 2008. On draught in the United Kingdom it is typically served at 5 to 7 degrees Celsius, although an Extra Cold variant served at 3 to 5 degrees Celsius has been available since 2006. Its taste, or perceived lack of it, has been criticised by some, with Andrew Jefford describing it as a "blandly foamy nitrokeg travesty of the original [cask conditioned version]".

- Boddingtons Pub Ale (4.6% ABV)

A higher ABV version of Boddingtons Draught Bitter, brewed since 1993 for export markets. It was available in the United Kingdom from 1995–6 as Boddingtons Export, on draught and in widget bottles.

- Boddingtons Manchester Gold (4.8% ABV)

After Export was delisted by British supermarkets in 1996, Boddingtons launched a 4.8% hybrid ale with a £4m advertising campaign referencing the Calvin Klein Obsession perfume adverts. Manchester Gold was still being advertised in August 1997 but was withdrawn soon afterwards.

== Advertising ==
The Boddingtons two bees logo was introduced in 1900. The bees are a symbol of Manchester, from a time when it was a "hive of industry", but the two bees also represent a pun on the company name of Boddingtons Breweries.

Boddingtons largely eschewed above the line advertising until 1987, when it was first advertised on Granada television in the North West of England. The tagline from 1987 until 1991 was "If you don't get Boddies, you'll just get bitter". Under Whitbread's custodianship the comedian Frankie Howerd fronted the campaign in a series of six television advertisements which mainly aired in the North West in 1990–1991.

An award-winning Boddingtons print advertisement from 1992. The ice cream represents the beer's creaminess.

From July 1991 until 1999, a series of Boddingtons advertisements created by the Bartle Bogle Hegarty (BBH) agency used "The Cream of Manchester" tagline. The campaign, credited with revitalising the image of Manchester, was arguably third behind Manchester United and Coronation Street in raising the city's profile. Originally a set of print advertisements, the campaign was extended to television in 1992. The television advertisements featured beautiful women with unlikely Mancunian accents and "achieved the seemingly impossible task of making bitter glamorous". The most famous television advertisement featured a glamorous couple on-board gondolas on Manchester's River Irwell, in a parody of a well-known "just one Cornetto" ice cream advertisement. According to the Manchester Evening News, "it told the world something about the reinvention of the murky old city, that its once-filthy waterway could almost pass for Venice."

The series won several international advertising awards for BBH. The brand's creaminess was emphasised through items such as face cream, ice cream, sun cream and whipped cream. Managing director of Whitbread, Miles Templeman, explained that:

We were thinking how to turn a second-rate north-west brand into something more stylish, to make it more appealing again. BBH thought of focusing on the creamy aspect, of selling a beer like a face cream.

A previously unknown Melanie Sykes launched her career as a television presenter following her appearances in the adverts from 1996 until 1999. The 1997 ice cream van advert was part of an £8 million campaign launched on Saturday 20 September 1997, filmed in a California desert. Animated television advertisements starring the transgender playboy cow Graham Heffer ran from 1999 until 2002. The adverts attracted complaints from the public for allegedly promoting bestiality, homosexuality and drug-taking. Boddingtons become an official partner of the 2002 XVII Commonwealth Games held in Manchester in a deal worth at least £1 million. To mark the occasion, a special Boddingtons 5% ABV Commonwealth Ale cask ale was produced for the North West of England, and subsequently launched nationwide. The last Boddingtons television advertising campaign in 2005 was criticised for capitalising on the beer's Manchester heritage with a Happy Mondays soundtrack, even though production had moved out of the city. Mike Thompson, a former worker at the brewery and representative of the Transport & General Workers' Union, said:

This is at best cynical and at worst a slur on our great city, its heritage and the Strangeways workers. People have lost their livelihoods because of how this company has behaved. They will not be best pleased at what we can only see as pouring salt on the wounds.
