= Boddingtons Bitter =

British beer

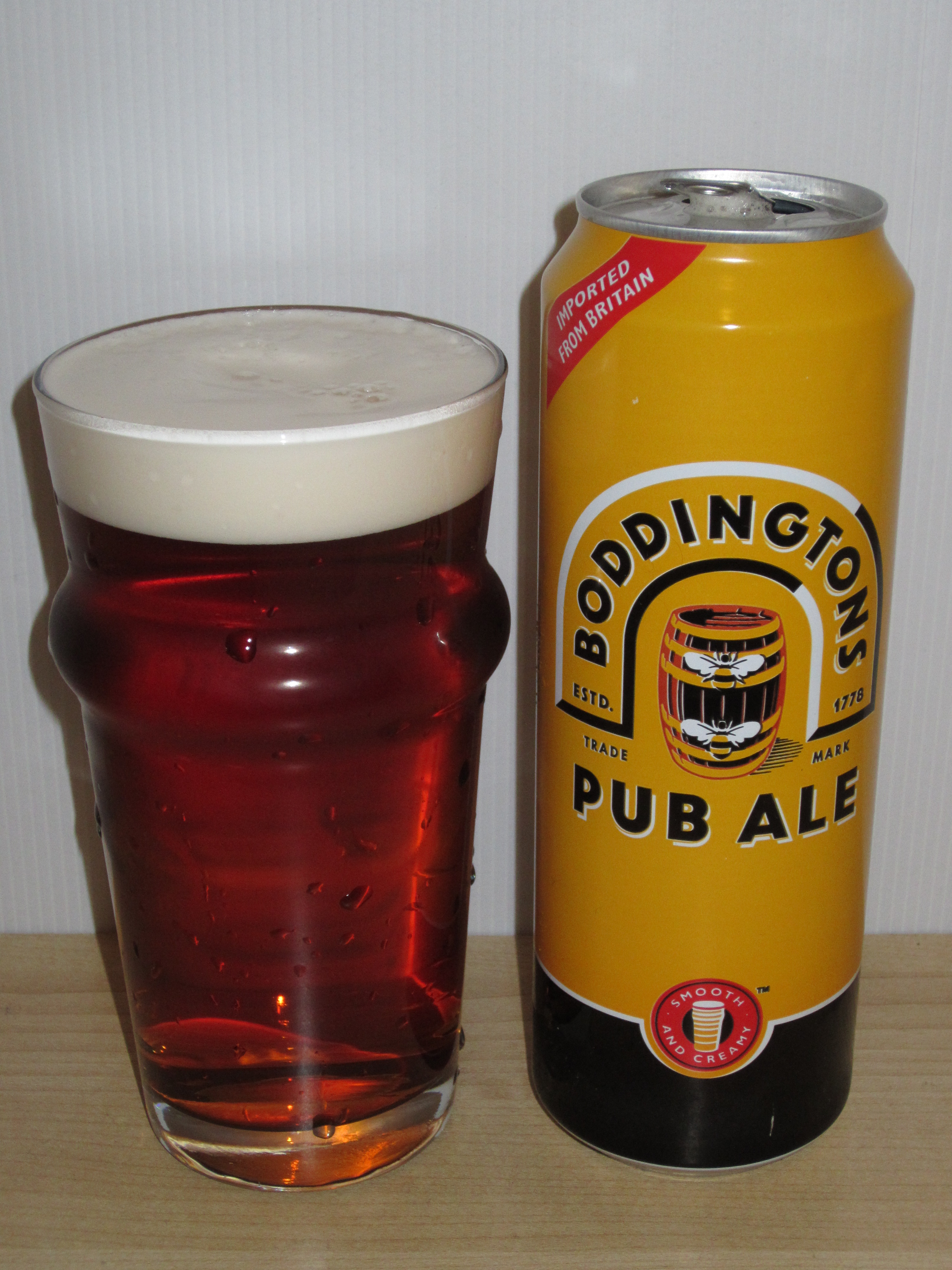
- Type: Beer
- Manufacturer: AB InBev
- Origin: Manchester, England
- Introduced: 1971
- Alcohol by volume: 3.5 %
- Colour: straw/golden
- Variants: Boddingtons Pub Ale

Boddingtons Bitter is a straw-golden bitter beer originally produced by Boddington & Co at their Strangeways Brewery in Manchester. It is now owned by AB-InBev and produced at their brewery in Samlesbury, Lancashire.

It is notable as one of the first beers to be packaged in cans containing a widget, giving it a creamy draught-style head. In the 1990s, the beer was heavily marketed as The Cream of Manchester in an advertising campaign credited with raising the city's profile. Adverts from 1996 to 1999 featured Melanie Sykes, who returned to the adverts in 2017 to mark 21 years since her first advert.

Whitbread acquired Boddingtons in 1989, and gave the bitter nationwide distribution and an increased marketing budget. Boddingtons Bitter achieved its peak market share in 1997 and at the time was exported to over forty countries. Interbrew (now AB-InBev) acquired the Whitbread Beer Company in 2000. Strangeways Brewery was closed in 2004 and production of pasteurised (keg and can) Boddingtons was moved to Samlesbury. Production of the cask conditioned beer moved to Hydes Brewery in Moss Side, Manchester until it was discontinued in 2012.

== History ==
=== Introduction of Boddingtons Bitter ===
Boddingtons Bitter in its current form was introduced in 1971, brewed at Boddingtons' Strangeways Brewery. The product's increasing popularity drove the growth of the company throughout the 1970s. The Observer commented in 1974 that the product's low price and distinctive flavour afforded it an unusually loyal following. Michael Jackson described the beer as "one of Britain's outstanding bitters" in 1978. In 1981 The Observer commented,

what has stood Boddingtons in good stead is the highly distinctive flavour of its brews, especially its bitters. In fact, in the North-West, Boddies is increasingly becoming a sort of cult brew.

Concerns regarding quality control meant that the brewery had been reluctant to extend distribution outside its heartland. Boddingtons Bitter was distributed in the Home Counties for the first time in 1983. However with the expansion of production there were complaints that the beer had lost some of its former character. Regardless of these allegations, Boddingtons Bitter accounted for 90 per cent of production at Strangeways Brewery by 1986.

Boddingtons Bitter was introduced in keg form in 1987. It was initially only supplied to the free trade, particularly social clubs, and the Boddingtons tied estate continued to supply the cask conditioned product.

=== Growth of the brand under Whitbread ===
The company was acquired by Whitbread in 1989. Whitbread was motivated to fill a gap in its portfolio by owning a credible cask ale brand with a national reputation. Whitbread's superior capitalisation and distribution network allowed it to take the Boddingtons brand nationwide. Boddingtons had been in decline before the Whitbread takeover, and although it retained an almost "cult" following within its Manchester heartland, only 5 per cent of sales were outside the North West.

Whitbread transformed the brand from regional to national, expanding production from 200,000 to 850,000 barrels a year between 1989 and 1995. By 1993 the cask version was outsold only by Tetley and John Smith's, and the majority of sales were outside of the North West. By 1994 it was the fourth-highest selling bitter brand in the country. The canned variant was distributed nationwide from 1990 and was the highest-selling canned bitter in the UK from 1992 until 2000. The beer was officially exported overseas from 1993, initially to Canada. The rise in sales of the beer coincided with the elevation of Manchester from "city of dark, beaten mills to the cultural magnet of Madchester". Manchester and the North of England were now fashionable in the public consciousness and rejuvenated from an image of industrial decay. Whitbread chief executive Peter Jarvis commented in 1995 that:

It was very fortuitous that the brewery was in Manchester. To outsiders, Manchester is a very attractive place – known the world over for soccer, art, music and broadcasting. It would be difficult to have a Cream of Wolverhampton even though Banks's beer is very good. People do not aspire to visit Wolverhampton. On the whole they try to by-pass it.

Success was attributed to an excellent marketing campaign, and being the first canned ale to be sold with a widget after Guinness. In 1997 Boddingtons sales peaked, and 1998 saw a drop in sales of 10 per cent. Boddingtons had been turned into: "a fashion product ... and as with all fashion products, the drinkers moved on". Despite this setback, in 1998–1999 Boddingtons' share of the UK ale market grew to 4.9 per cent, and sales grew by 7.3 per cent in 1999–2000.

=== Decline of the brand under InBev ===
In 2000, the Whitbread Beer Company was acquired by the Belgian brewer Interbrew, which owned Stella Artois. At that time one in eight barrels of Boddingtons was exported to some 40 countries worldwide, including China, the United States, Taiwan and the West Indies.

John Hegarty, who had worked on the 1990s Boddingtons advertising campaigns, argued that Interbrew, "just didn't care [about the brand], they underinvested and let it rot".

The Strangeways Brewery kegging facility closed in 2003 with the loss of 50 jobs. Amidst falling sales, Interbrew relaunched the cask product in the North West of England, with an increased strength. The relaunch was unsuccessful and the changes were reversed.

In 2004, the owners (now known as InBev) announced plans to close the Strangeways Brewery and move most production from Manchester to Magor in South Wales and Samlesbury, Lancashire, with the loss of 60 jobs. Boddingtons cask ale production, which accounted for less than 10 per cent of output, was moved to Hydes Brewery in Moss Side. Production ended in 2005 and the brewery was demolished in 2007.

In 2010, it was speculated that InBev (known as Anheuser-Busch InBev from 2008 onwards) would attempt to sell the Boddingtons brand to another brewer after its failed attempt to sell the UK rights to Bass ale. The Times was damning of what it perceived as InBev's mismanagement of the brand, which had "declined under AB InBev's hands. The brand was once a leading part of the old Whitbread Beer Company, but its fortunes had dwindled since the closure in 2005 of the Strangeways Brewery."

In 2010, Boddingtons was the sixth-highest selling bitter in the United Kingdom, although sales had dropped by almost three-quarters since the takeover by Anheuser–Busch InBev in 2000. In 2011, AB InBev's UK president Stuart MacFarlane claimed "We still believe in the brand", whilst admitting to not advertising the brand for five years, instead reaping the rewards of memories of earlier advertising. Contract brewing of Boddingtons Cask continued until 2012 when production of the beer ended.

Production was around 250,000 hectolitres (6,604,301 US Gallons) in 2012, with around 80 per cent of production destined for the UK market, and around 20 per cent destined for export markets such as Taiwan, Singapore and United Arab Emirates.

In 2017, Anheuser–Busch InBev announced that it was launching a digital, social, PR and video campaign for Boddingtons featuring Melanie Sykes who had appeared in adverts for the brand in 1997.

The cask-conditioned variant was reintroduced in 2025. It is brewed under licence by the Manchester-based brewer JW Lees.

== Variants ==
Boddingtons has a distinctive straw-golden coloured body with a creamy white head, which is achieved by the addition of nitrogen.

- Boddingtons Draught Bitter (3.5% ABV)

The nitrogenated and pasteurised variant of the beer available in kegs and cans. It is brewed in Samlesbury. The canned variant, launched in 1991, contains a widget to give the beer a creamy white head. The beer's ABV was reduced from 3.8% to 3.5% in late 2008. On draught in the United Kingdom it is typically served at 5 to 7 degrees Celsius, although an Extra Cold variant served at 3 to 5 degrees Celsius has been available since 2006. Its taste, or perceived lack of it, has been criticised by some, with Andrew Jefford describing it as a "blandly foamy nitrokeg travesty of the original [cask conditioned version]".

- Boddingtons Pub Ale (4.6% ABV)

A higher ABV version of Boddingtons Draught Bitter, brewed since 1993 for export markets. It was available in the United Kingdom from 1995–6 as Boddingtons Export. Also sold in the UK under the label "Manchester Gold".
