= Hydes =

Hydes is a surname. Notable people with the surname include:

- Alan Hydes (born 1947), British table tennis player
- Arthur Hydes (1911–1990), British football player
- Steven Hydes (born 1986), British adoptee

== See also ==
- Hodes
- Hydes Brewery
