= Sacha Lord =

British political figure, entrepreneur, author and co-creator (born 1972)

- Born: Sacha John Edward Lord; 26 January 1972 (age 54); Altrincham, Cheshire, England
- Occupations: Music entrepreneur; Adviser
- Known for: Co-founder of The Warehouse Project Co-founder of Parklife festival Night Time Economy Adviser for Greater Manchester Chairman of Wythenshawe F.C.
- Spouse: Demi Mclaughlin (m. 2022)

Sacha John Edward Lord (born 26 January 1972), also known as Sacha John Lord-Marchionne, is a British political figure, entrepreneur, author and co-creator of the Parklife festival and The Warehouse Project.

He has served as Chair of the Night Time Industries Association since 2023. He was Greater Manchester’s Night Time Economy Adviser from 2018 to 2025, appointed by Mayor Andy Burnham.

== Early life ==
Lord was born on 26 January 1972 in Altrincham, Cheshire (now Greater Manchester), and grew up in the town. His father was a textile merchant, and his mother an interior designer. Lord was educated at Manchester Grammar School, leaving at aged 18 having gained two Us and an E at A-Level. After leaving school, Lord worked at a clothes shop in Altrincham, and later started a market stall at Liverpool market, selling leather jackets. After quitting his market job, Lord became involved in the rave-influenced music scene, and spent most of his time listening to The Stone Roses, Prince, The Smiths and David Bowie.

== Business ventures ==
=== The Warehouse Project ===
Inspired by the success of events at Home and Sankeys nightclubs in Manchester, Lord launched the Warehouse Project, a series of rave events running annually from September to 1 January, in 2006 with co-founder Sam Kandel.

It began operations in the disused Boddingtons Brewery in Strangeways, and then moved into a space under Manchester Piccadilly station, on Store Street, which previously served as an air raid shelter.

The opening night of The Warehouse Project was described by Lord as "a nightmare" due to its location next to the prison, and he later revealed the Governor of HM Prison Manchester had called to say it was disturbing inmates.

The Warehouse Project went on to feature some of the most in-demand names in international house and techno music, including New Order, The Chemical Brothers and Calvin Harris - whose appearance, Lord later went onto reveal, was a favour for an A&R at Sony. Lord revealed he put Harris (an unknown DJ at the time) on the 21:30 slot, despite doors only opening at 22:00.

The Warehouse Project attracted 100,000 people in its first year and has continued to sell out annually.

In 2019, Lord and Kandel moved The Warehouse Project to Depot at the former Manchester Mayfield railway station, a move which saw it become the biggest club night in the UK with a 10,000 person capacity. The move also put it on a par with the current Guinness World Record holder of the largest nightclub in the world, Privilege in Ibiza, which can also hold 10,000 revellers.

Lord has been a supporter for drug safety campaigns and has called for drug testing laboratories and on site forensic testing at all UK clubs and festivals. Although not responsible for the incident, Lord's campaigning followed the death of Nick Bonnie, 30, in 2013 who was found collapsed at a Warehouse Project rave after taking almost 15 times the standard recreational dose of MDMA.

The Warehouse Project events were put on hold in 2020 due to the Coronavirus pandemic, but returned in 2021 following the easing of lockdown restrictions.

=== Parklife Festival ===
Lord co-created Parklife Festival in 2010, to celebrate artists across indie, house and techno music. It has hosted some of the biggest names in music, including Snoop Dogg, Liam Gallagher and Skepta.

The weekend festival, which moved from Platt Fields Park in Fallowfield to Heaton Park, Manchester in 2012, attracts 80,000 visitors each year.

The Festival employs over 4,500 people over the weekend. Each year, it raises over £100k for the Parklife Community Foundation, that is distributed to help local causes.

Parklife Festival was cancelled in 2020 due to the Coronavirus pandemic and rescheduled to September 2021 following the easing of lockdown restrictions.

In July 2024, it was announced that Sacha Lord had exited The Warehouse Project and Parklife. In a statement, Lord confirmed that he would be exiting the two businesses he co-founded, following a deal to transfer his shares to LN Gaiety — a joint venture between Live Nation and Gaiety Investments which acquired a majority share in the businesses in 2016.

=== Hide Out Festival ===
Lord was one of the creators of Croatia's Hideout Festival, a five-day alternative music extravaganza held on the island of Pag, in 2011. It has sold out every single year since its conception.

=== Wythenshawe F.C. ===
In April 2023, Lord was announced as the new chairman of newly promoted non-league football club Wythenshawe F.C. He stepped down from the role in June 2025.

=== Primary Events Solutions ===
In 2021, Primary Event Solutions (originally named Primary Security Limited), a company in which Lord was founding director and 30% shareholder, received a £401,928 grant from Arts Council England’s Culture Recovery Fund to support cultural activity during the COVID-19 pandemic.

In May 2024, Arts Council England announced it would conduct additional checks on the application after Manchester newspaper The Mill published investigative reporting alleging that the application included exaggerated descriptions of the company’s services and cited economic impact figures attributed to the Greater Manchester Combined Authority that the authority said it did not recognise. Prolific North later reported that Lord had threatened The Mill with a libel action before subsequently withdrawing that threat.

In reporting published during a review of the grant award, The Mill said the Culture Recovery Fund application described Primary Event Solutions as providing a range of event services including “event coordinators, managers, production managers, assistants, technicians, sound engineers, lighting engineers, AV, bar staff… and more”, but quoted former directors and staff who said they only recalled the business operating as a security company and not providing such specialist services.

Following an eight-month review, Arts Council England withdrew the grant and stated it was seeking to recover the funds after concluding that the application breached the terms and conditions by supplying information that was “wrong or misleading, either by mistake or because you were trying to mislead us”, a clause the council said did not require it to determine whether the misleading information was supplied deliberately.

Lord acknowledged that there were inaccuracies in the application and described them as “unintended oversights”, but stated that the Arts Council did not find evidence that the company had “deliberately misled” the funding body.

As a result of the Arts Council’s decision, Lord resigned from his position as Night Time Economy Adviser to Mayor Andy Burnham in January 2025.

In February 2026, Lord said that government-appointed reviewers had found no evidence of wrongdoing. Writing about the dispute in the Evening Standard, he criticised what he described as unclear guidance and limited engagement from Arts Council England during the process, and said the experience "showed how punitive and exhausting funding processes can become in practice, even when no wrongdoing is ultimately found". After Lord published his piece in the Evening Standard, Arts Council England reiterated to The Mill and other publications that its review had found Primary Event Solutions had “indeed, deliberately or involuntarily, mislead” the council, and that it had ruled the company must repay the £401,928 award.

As of February 2026, Arts Council England had not recovered the £401,928 and stated that “no funds remain with which to repay the debt” and that, as the company no longer exists as a trading entity following the completion of its liquidation on 11 February 2025, it was “determining our next steps”.

== Night Time Economy Adviser ==
=== Appointment as Adviser ===
In 2018, Greater Manchester Mayor Andy Burnham appointed Sasha Lord as the region's first "Night Time Economy Adviser". The position was unpaid, with any income generated being donated to charity. Although Lord did not formally apply for the role, he had lobbied Burnham on the importance of nightlife prior to Burnham's victory in the inaugural mayoral elections in May 2017.

The role involved advising Burnham and the Greater Manchester Combined Authority (GMCA) on matters related to the night-time economy, representing the interests of workers, operators, and the industry as a whole. The night-time economy is a significant part of Greater Manchester's economy, employing 358,000 people, about 33% of the region's workforce.

=== Advocacy for the night-time economy ===
Lord made several recommendations to improve safety, transport, and cultural diversity within the night-time economy. These included proposing extended opening hours to increase accessibility and advocating for the development of better night-time transport links to serve under-represented communities in the outskirts of the region.

In August 2018, Lord also campaigned for a fair wage policy for night-time hospitality staff, calling for full transparency in tipping practices for bar and restaurant workers.

=== Role during the COVID-19 pandemic ===
The COVID-19 pandemic brought Lord to the forefront of discussions on the future of the nightlife sector. As a leading voice for UK nightlife, his expertise was sought by Paul Scully, the Secretary of State for Small Business, Consumers, and Labour Markets, to help businesses survive during the pandemic.

In October 2020, Lord initiated legal proceedings against the UK Government in response to the 22:00 curfew imposed on hospitality venues. He argued that the policy disproportionately impacted sections of society in disadvantaged areas who relied on wet-led pubs for community socialization. The case was later moved to the High Court but did not progress further as the government had already removed the policy by March 2021.

In March 2021, Lord filed a new legal case challenging the continued closure of indoor hospitality venues, arguing that they were safer than non-essential retail stores due to their Covid-safe measures. Lord's legal efforts were supported by industry groups, including UKHospitality and the British Beer and Pub Association.

=== Post-pandemic efforts ===
In May 2023, Lord announced that he was working with lawyers from JMW Solicitors to assist hospitality businesses in recovering hidden commissions paid to brokers by energy companies, which he identified as a contributing factor to hospitality closures.

Later in 2023, Lord called for the UK government to reinstate the hospitality VAT rate to 12.5%, in line with rates in other European countries. This request was part of a "five-point plan to save hospitality," which was presented at the Labour Party Conference in Liverpool.

=== Support for night-time transport ===
In July 2024, Lord supported Greater Manchester Mayor Andy Burnham's initiative to introduce a night-time bus service. He argued that night workers should not face higher transport costs due to their work hours. The new service was launched as part of a 24-hour transport pilot on September 1, 2024.

=== Resignation ===
On 29 January 2025, Lord resigned from his position as Night Time Economy Adviser, citing the emotional toll caused by a review by Arts Council England into a grant awarded to a company, Primary Event Solutions, in which Lord was a minority shareholder. The grant had been awarded during the pandemic, but Arts Council England sought to recover the funds following an internal review. Lord criticized the review process, highlighting inconsistencies and a lack of proportionality. Arts Council England had previously cleared the company in 2022, stating no misuse of public funds had occurred.

=== Continued advocacy ===
Since 2023, Lord has served as Chair of the Night Time Industries Association, the trade body for the night time economy.

He was appointed to the advisory board of the International Nightlife Association in February 2026, and is an Honorary Fellow of the Institute of Hospitality.

== Charitable work ==
Lord was patron of the Joshua Wilson Brain Tumour Charity (charity reg number 1151518) until he resigned the role in 2021

Lord is also a campaigner on the importance of mental health for those working in the night-time economy.

During the global Coronavirus pandemic in 2020, Lord co-founded the UnitedWeStream Manchester campaign, a livestream gig website which raised over £600,000 for businesses in the night time economy and charities in Greater Manchester including the Mayor's Homelessness Charity and music therapy charity, Nordoff Robbins, through a relief fund on the website. A number of artists performed on the live stream website, including Roger Sanchez and Paul Oakenfold.

In February 2023, Lord announced the launch of The Sacha Lord Foundation (charity reg number 1204808), a charity providing those aged 15–21 with educational funding and employment opportunities in the hospitality and event sectors.

== Author ==
In April 2024, Sacha Lord released his memoir Tales From the Dancefloor which reflected on the history of nightclub culture in Manchester, UK. It became a Sunday Times Bestseller in its first week on sale.

In its review of the book, The Daily Telegraph said "Anyone who has partied in Manchester over the past 20 years can thank Sacha Lord," and that "Lord has put Manchester's clubland on the map for a new generation."

== Political activity ==
In November 2022, he announced he had joined the Labour Party. He donated to the party ahead of the 2024 general election. Following the 2024 Budget, he criticised the government's approach to hospitality, saying it would have a negative impact on the sector. In an interview with Times Radio in January 2026, Lord criticised the economic policies of the Labour government and their impact on the hospitality sector, stating "No one is investing at the moment in this sector and that's why I did tear up my membership and I regret being a Labour Party donor." He added he would consider rejoining if Labour was under new leadership.

== Personal life ==
Lord married Demi Mclaughlin, a category manager for the online retailer Very, in April 2022, in Capri. The wedding had been postponed from 2021 due to COVID. In July 2024, Lord announced his wife, Demi, was pregnant with their first child.
