= Hodes =

Hodes is a surname. Notable people with the surname include:

- Art Hodes (1904–1993), American jazz pianist
- Charlie Hodes (1848–1875), American baseball player
- Charlotte Hodes (born 1959), English artist
- Henry I. Hodes (1899–1962), United States Army general
- Joan Hodes (1925–2022), British watercolourist and oil painter
- Louis Hodes (1934–2008), American mathematician, computer scientist and cancer researcher
- Paul Hodes (born 1951), American politician
- Richard Hodes (1924–2002), American politician
- Rick Hodes (born 1953), American physician
