= Star and Garter, Manchester =

Listed pub and live-music venue in Manchester, England

Star and Garter
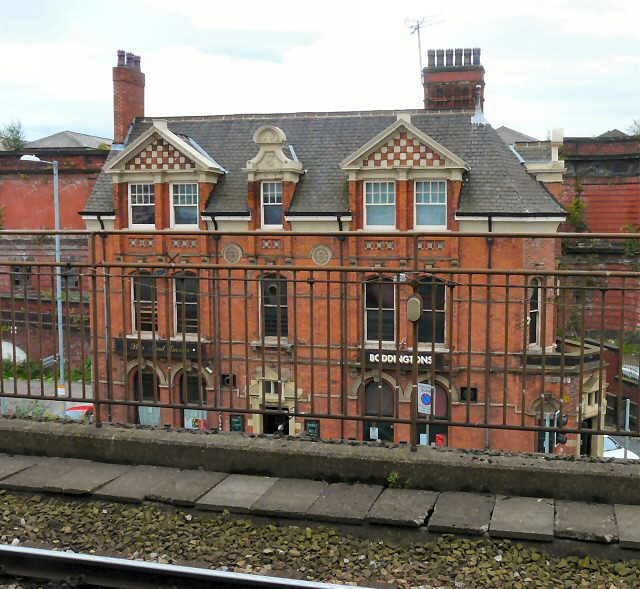
- The pub in 2009

General information
- Type: Public house
- Location: 18–20 Fairfield Street, Manchester, England
- Coordinates: 53.4760°N 2.2273°W
- Year built: 1877; 149 years ago
- Owner: Mayfield Partnership

Technical details
- Floor count: 3

Design and construction
- Designations

Listed Building – Grade II
- Official name: Star and Garter public house
- Designated: 20 June 1988
- Reference no.: 1200827

Other information
- Public transit: Manchester Piccadilly

Website
- starandgarter.co.uk

The Star and Garter is a Grade II listed public house and live-music venue on Fairfield Street in Manchester, England. Originally built nearby in 1803, it was dismantled and re‑erected on its present site during railway expansion and reopened in 1877. It served successive waves of railway and postal workers, later closed in the 1980s as the surrounding area declined, and reopened in 1991 as a live‑music venue. The building is now owned by the Mayfield Partnership, and in 2025 its continued operation was supported by Broadwick, the operator of Depot Mayfield.

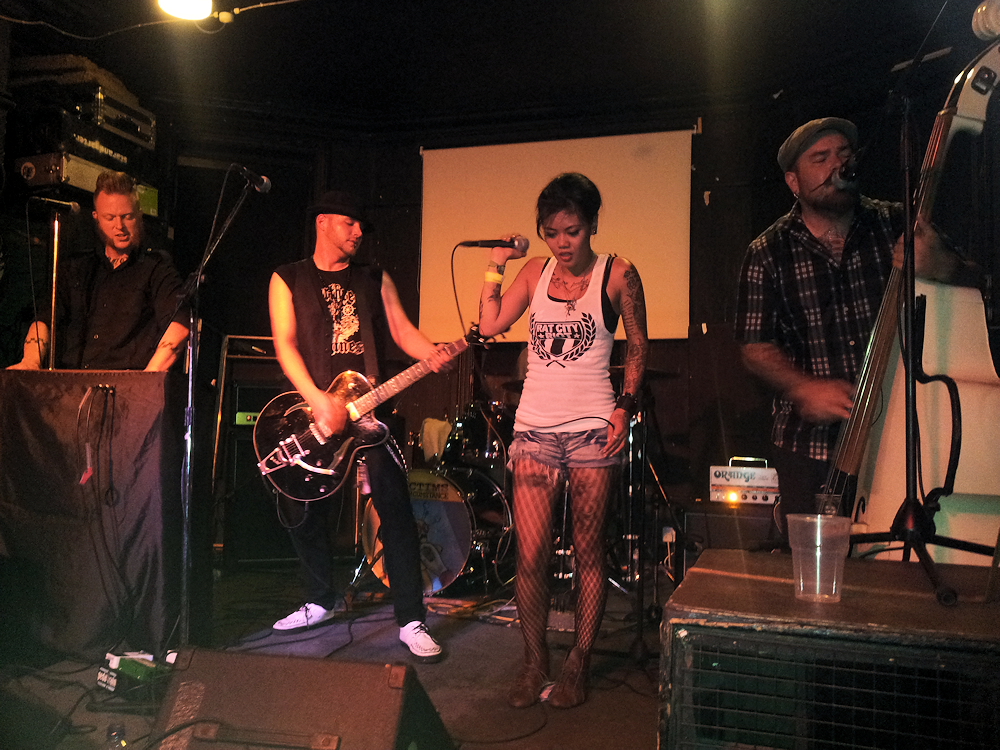
The Creepshow live at the Star and Garter, 2012

== History ==
The Star and Garter was built in 1803 approximately 50 yards (46 metres) from its current position. When Store Street/Bank Top/London Road railway station (the original names of Piccadilly station) was expanded with the addition of the connecting line to Oxford Road station in 1849, the building was moved, brick by brick, onto its current site and reopened in 1877 as the Star and Garter Hotel.

The building survived the Manchester Blitz, suffering firebomb damage to the roof which was fortunate considering that London Road (Piccadilly) railway station was a major target for the bombers.

While Mayfield and Piccadilly stations were both active, the Star and Garter catered for railway workers and subsequently post office workers when Parcelforce opened a warehouse on Travis Street, which was linked to Mayfield station via a conveyor belt spanning Fairfield Street. In 1986 Mayfield station closed and fell rapidly into disrepair which in turn prompted Chester's Brewery to close the pub due to lack of business. The whole area around Mayfield station followed suit and became almost derelict in parts and marked the beginnings of the area becoming a red light district.

On 20 June 1988, the pub was designated a Grade II listed building. In 1990 the Star and Garter was purchased privately and the upstairs space renovated with a bar added; in 1991 it reopened as a live music venue. After planning permission was granted, a fire escape was added and a late licence was issued so the Star and Garter became both a music venue and nightclub. The conditions of the late licence meant that some ornate seating downstairs had to be removed to comply with said conditions.

As of 2019, the building was owned by the Mayfield Partnership and in 2025 its future was secured when Broadwick, the operator of nearby Depot Mayfield, committed to supporting its continued operation. The pub had previously been protected during the Mayfield redevelopment, and it remains an independently run site.

== Architecture ==
The building is constructed in red brick with stone detailing and has a steep slate roof. It occupies a sharply angled corner plot and has an irregular shape. Its overall appearance follows a Gothic style with some Baroque touches.

The front facing Fairfield Street has three storeys, including small attic-level windows, arranged in five bays. The layout is symmetrical. The second and fourth bays contain paired windows and attic openings with small gabled features, while the central bay has single windows and a smaller attic opening. These attic features include decorative supports, patterned gables, and, at the centre, a shaped gable topped with a curved pediment.

The main entrance is in the centre and has a square-headed opening framed in stone. The ground-floor windows are arched, those on the first floor have shallow arches, and the attic windows are rectangular. The eaves are plastered and curved, and the chimney stacks are tall.

At the right-hand corner, the building is angled and includes a small projecting porch with a doorway in a Baroque-style surround. Above it is an attic opening similar to the one at the centre of the main front, marked with the date "AD 1877". The side elevation continues in the same general style.

== Filming location ==
The Star and Garter has been used as a location in the following productions:

- Band of Gold
- Cracker
- Prime Suspect
- There's Only One Jimmy Grimble
- Cradle to Grave
- Worried About the Boy
- It's a Sin
- Brassic
- 5lbs of Pressure

== See also ==
- Listed buildings in Manchester-M1
- Listed pubs in Greater Manchester
