= The Warehouse Project =

Series of club nights in Greater Manchester, England

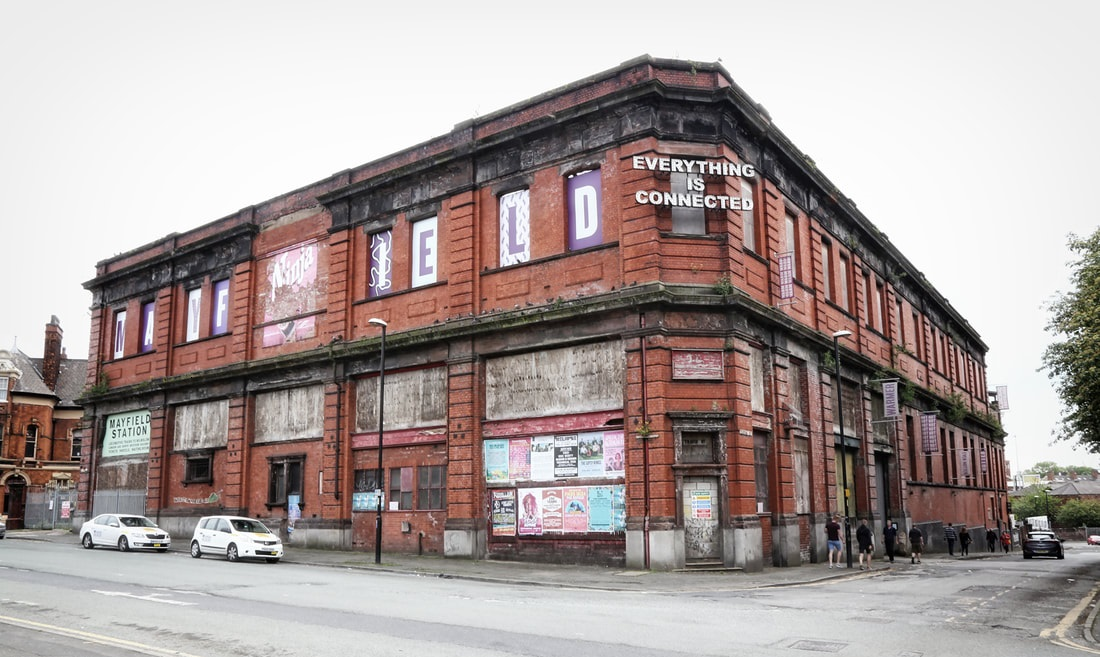
- The current Mayfield venue, pictured in 2020
- Interactive map of The Warehouse Project
- Location: Mayfield Depot (2019–present); Store St., Manchester (2014–2018); Victoria Warehouse, Trafford (2012–2013); Store St., Manchester (2007–11); Strangeways Brewery, Manchester (2006)
- Coordinates: 53.4757°N 2.228°W
- Capacity: 15,000
- Type: Nightclub
- Events: House, techno, Trance, electro, live concerts

Construction
- Opened: 2006

Website
- www.thewarehouseproject.com

The Warehouse Project is a series of club nights organised in Greater Manchester, England, since 2006. Unlike most other clubs, it has a limited seasonal approach rather than running all year. Each year's season runs from September through to New Year's Day, plus occasional one off dates such as Bank Holiday weekends. This period corresponds with the busiest time of the year and the student calendar.

== History ==
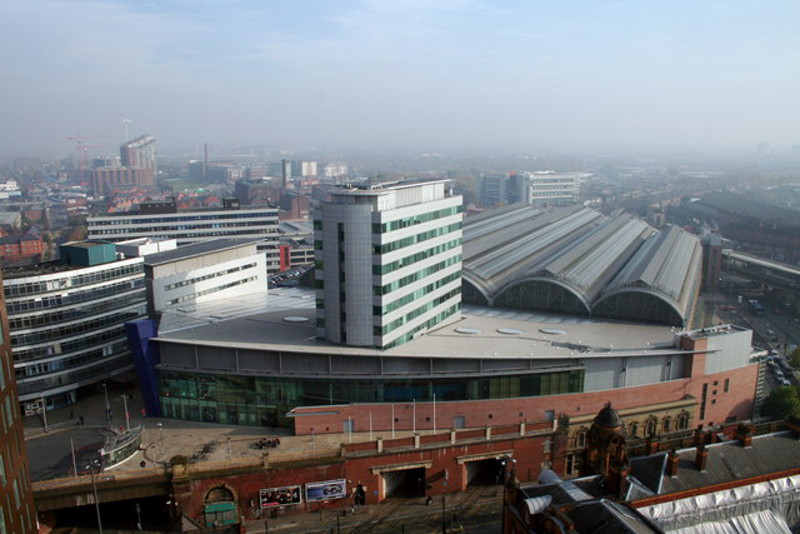
Warehouse Project events were held underneath Piccadilly station (Store Street) from 2014 to 2018, and were also previously held there from 2007 to 2011.

The Warehouse Project was initially started as a joint venture by Sacha Lord and Sam Kandel, who both had previous involvement with the Sankeys nightclub in Manchester. It began operations in the disused Boddingtons Brewery in Strangeways, and then moved into a space under Manchester Piccadilly station, on Store Street, which previously served as an air raid shelter.

On 14 July 2011, The Warehouse Project announced that the 2011 season would be the last ever WHP event at Store Street. This was followed by a later announcement on 22 March 2012 that the 2012 season would be based at the Victoria Warehouse, to the west of Manchester city centre in Trafford Park, near Old Trafford football stadium. The club remained at this location for the 2013 season as well. In late 2013, rumours started that The Warehouse Project was due to move to the disused Mayfield Depot next to Manchester Piccadilly station from 2014 but a planning application was subsequently withdrawn in September 2013. The Warehouse Project's 2013 season drew to a close at the end of the year, with a final closing party on 1 January 2014 at the Victoria Warehouse venue.

Despite the announcement made in 2011, the 2014 season returned to Store Street, in a move described by the organisers as returning to their "spiritual home" for one last year. During this time, the owners of Mayfield Depot decided to redevelop their site rather than retaining it as a cultural venue, so the 2015 season was again located at Store Street.

The 2017 season was announced in July 2017, with 31 shows at Store Street from September that year. The "last ever" event at Store Street was held in 2018.

In 2019, the events moved to a refurbished Depot Mayfield.

The project hosted their first event outside the UK in 2023 in Rotterdam, and returned to the city in 2025.

In August 2025, a no-phone policy was announced for some events, however a music journalist reported that most attendees at a trial event were disregarding the rule.

DJ Mag rated The Warehouse Project their 4th top club in the world in their 2025 list.

The short film Twenty Years In Manchester was released in 2026 to celebrate the project's 20 year anniversary.

== Music and artists ==
Since its foundation, the club has played host to numerous internationally acclaimed DJs such as Carl Cox, Sven Väth, Aphex Twin, Richie Hawtin, Deadmau5, Annie Mac, Pete Tong, Armand Van Helden and Erick Morillo, and musicians such as De La Soul, Happy Mondays, Chic, The Prodigy, Disclosure, Basement Jaxx and Foals. In 2007, The Warehouse Project was voted by dance music magazine Mixmag as the best club in the United Kingdom. In 2013, The Warehouse Project was voted by DJ Magazine as the "Best Club Series" in the magazine's Best of British Awards.

== Awards and nominations ==
=== DJ Magazine's top 100 clubs ===
Year	Position	Notes	Ref.
2013	19	New entry	
2014	26	—N/a	
2015	12	—N/a	
2016	28	—N/a	
2017	17	—N/a	
2018	27	—N/a	
2019	26	—N/a	
2020	11	—N/a	
2021	9	—N/a	
2022	8	—N/a	
2023	9	—N/a	
2024	6	—N/a	
2025	4	—N/a	

== Fatalities ==
Two high-profile deaths have occurred at The Warehouse Project, those of Nick Bonnie and Souvik Pal, alongside several reports in the media of near-misses. These incidents resulted in calls from local councillors such as David Acton and Mike Cordingley for the licence to be revoked or reviewed. However, police statements have countered this, with high-ranking officers supporting the club and its management. Sixteen individuals were hospitalised during the first weekend of the 2013 season from taking drugs at the venue, and also included drug dealers at the club who attempted to avoid arrest by swallowing all their stash.

=== Souvik Pal ===
At the end of the 2012 season, on New Year's Eve, Souvik Pal was escorted out of the club. He was subsequently found dead in the adjacent canal later that month. The unexplained death was later reclassified as a murder investigation after reports of Pal being seen leaving the area with an unknown individual after being thrown out of the club. Although the death did not occur on the premises of the club, local councilors questioned whether the security at the club was sufficient.

=== Nick Bonnie ===
On the very first night of the 2013 season, a group of friends from Gloucestershire attended the opening event at The Warehouse Project. During the course of the night, one of their party fell ill and had to be taken to hospital, where he later died due to an overdose of an illegal drug he had consumed at The Warehouse Project. Initially, it was believed that Bonnie had purchased the drug inside the club from a dealer, largely due to testimony of his friends, and this led to police and media fears of a "bad" batch of ecstasy, possibly laced with PMA. However, in subsequent court proceedings, the friends admitted to having invented this story to cover that they had brought the drug into the club themselves. The fall out from the death led to further calls for the club's licence to be reviewed, and in the following days further hospital statements contributed to media reporting that the club itself had become an unacceptable risk.

The club responded to this by increasing in the number of medical and security staff at the venue. Various national politicians, including the then Prime Minister David Cameron, commented on the incident and the dangers posed by people taking illegal drugs at clubs such as The Warehouse Project, calling it a tragic death.
