= J.W. Lees Brewery =

UK brewery and pub company

J.W. Lees & Co (Brewers) Ltd
- Type: Private
- Industry: Brewing, public houses
- Founded: 1828
- Founder: John Lees
- Headquarters: Manchester, United Kingdom
- Key people: Richard Lees-Jones; Christopher Lees-Jones; William Lees-Jones; Simon Lees-Jones; Michael Lees-Jones (Head Brewer)
- Products: Beer, pubs, inns and hotels
- Owner: The Lees-Jones Family

J.W. Lees & Co (Brewers) Ltd is a British brewery and pub company in Middleton, Greater Manchester, that has produced real ale since 1828. J.W. Lees is the oldest operating brewery in Manchester. The brewery owns and operates 150 pubs, inns and hotels mainly in North West England and North Wales. It also owns wine distributor Willoughby's.

== History ==
John William Lees

The brewery was formed in 1828 when retired cotton manufacturer John Lees purchased land in Middleton, Lancashire and built Greengate Brewery, from which the company still operates. His grandson, John William Lees, took over the company in 1876. The Greengate Brewery was rebuilt in 1876. The business was re-incorporated in 1955 when R.W.T. Lees-Jones bought the share capital of the company back under single ownership.

The company is still family owned and operated. When William, Simon, Christina, Anna and Michael Lees-Jones joined Richard and Christopher at J.W. Lees in the 1990s, they were the sixth generation from the founder to work in the company. In 2023 Louis Lees-Jones joined the company as the first member of the seventh generation of the family to work at J.W. Lees, opening Founder's Hall in February 2024.

In 2003 His Royal Highness Charles, Prince of Wales visited to celebrate the brewery's 175th anniversary.

In 2011, J.W. Lees announced a new beer, The Governor, in collaboration with chef Marco Pierre White, and in 2018 The Governor Lager was added to the range. Also in 2018, the company announced a collaboration with physicist Brian Cox, an amber ale entitled Cosmic Brew. In 2018, the brewery converted the old boiler house on site into a microbrewery in order to create more experimental small barrelage productions.

In 2019, J.W. Lees won Best Brewing Pub company at the publican awards.

In 2025, J.W. Lees was granted exclusive brewing rights of Boddingtons Cask. The cask version of Boddingtons was last brewed in 2012 by Hydes Brewery. The beer closely matches the original version which was brewed by Boddingtons Brewery themselves at Strangeways Brewery. Boddingtons closed their brewery in 2005 and was subsequently demolished and replaced by a car park.

== Beers ==
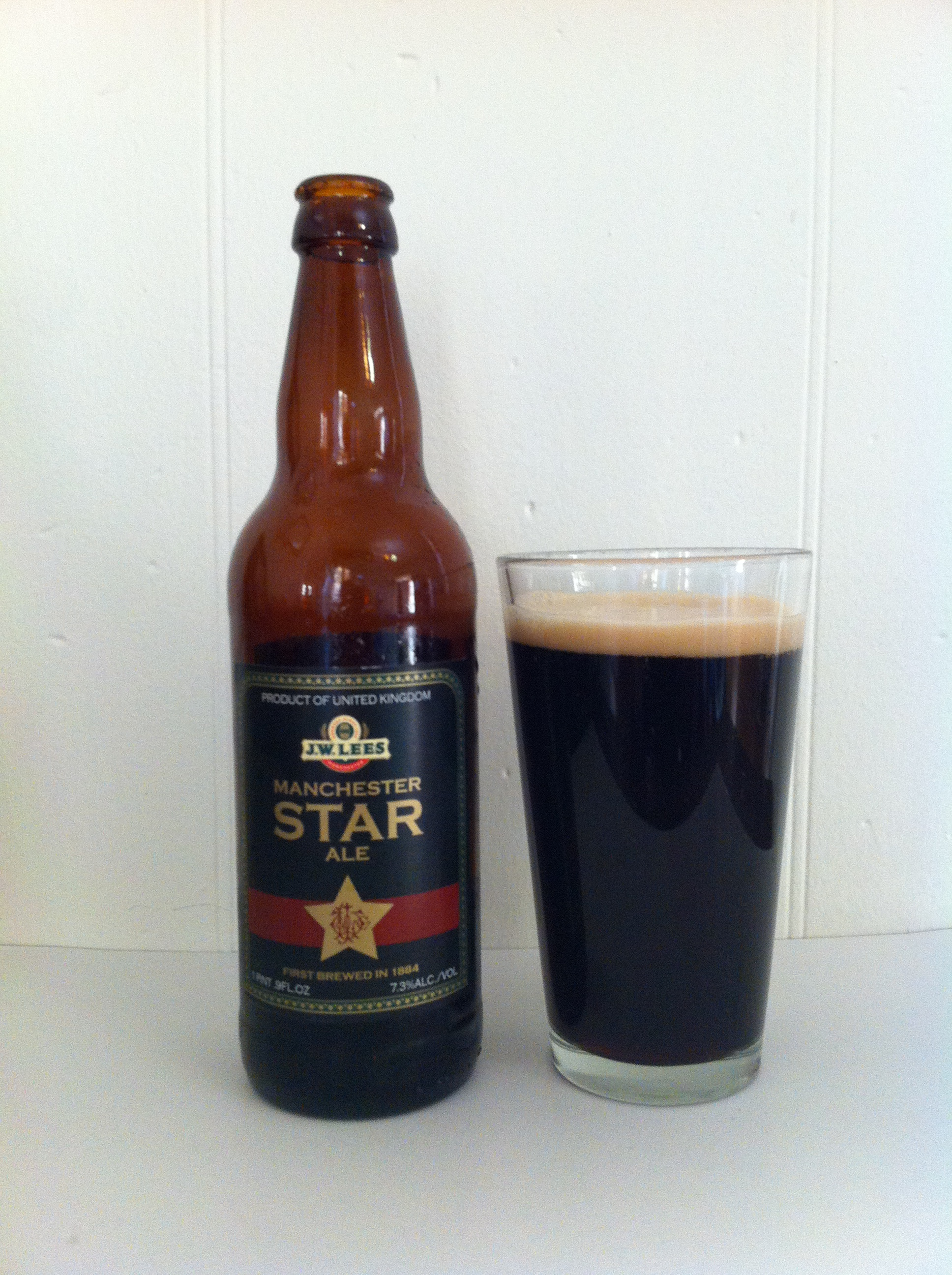
Manchester Star Ale

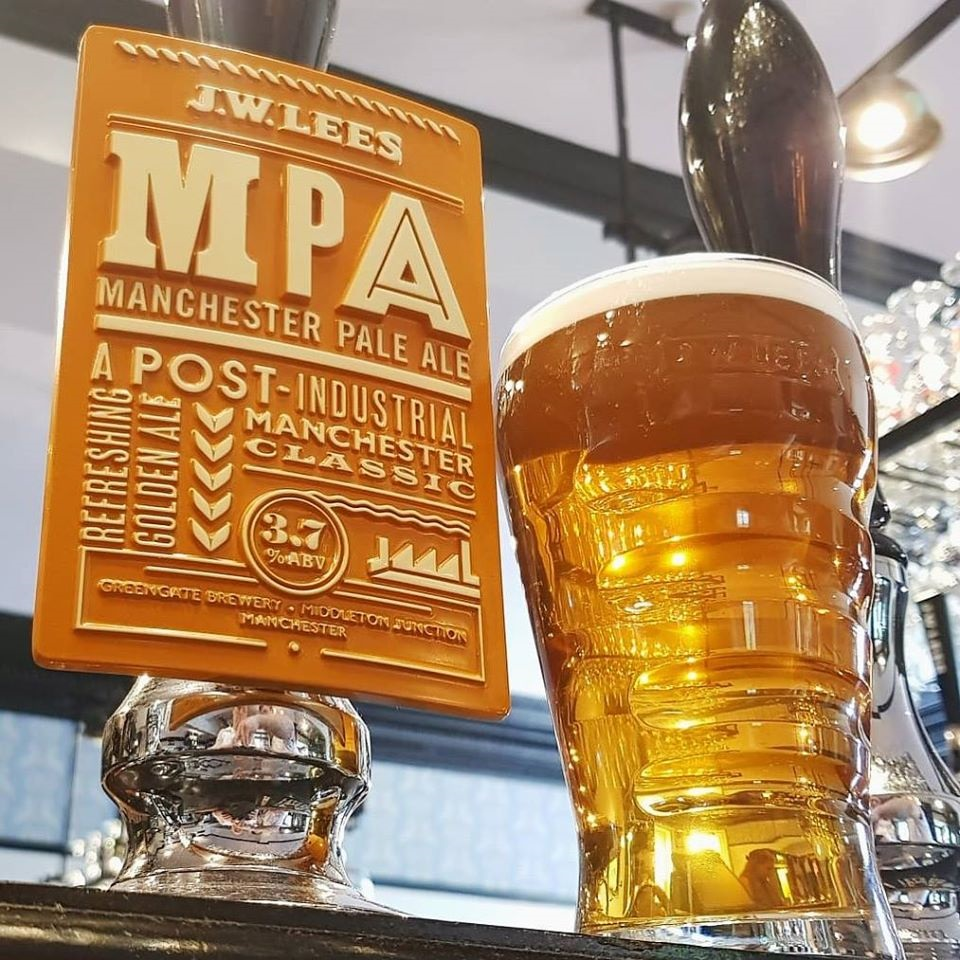
Pint of Manchester Pale Ale

Draught

Name	ABV	Notes
J.W. Lees Cask Bitter	4%	A bitter first brewed in 1828.
Founders	4.5%	Premium auburn ale
MPA	3.7%	IPA
Cosmic Brew	3.9%	Amber ale, formulated with Manchester physicist and musician Brian Cox.
Stout	4.2%	Stout
Gold	4.5%	Golden ale, hoppy and tropical flavour.
Brewer's Dark	3.5%	Dark mild, first brewed in 2005.
Plum Pudding	4.8%	Mahogany ale with subtle plum flavour. Only available at Christmas time.
Dragon's Fire	4%	Auburn ale, only available in Wales.
Boddingtons Cask	4%	Exclusive brewer of Boddingtons Cask Ale, brewed under licence from AB Inbev. Golden ale with a thick white creamy head.
Keg Beers
Greengate Smooth	3.2%	Amber ale, smooth and light.
Manchester Craft Lager	4.7%	Small batch lager first brewed in 2017.
Original Lager	4%	First brewed in 1995. Golden Original Lager was brewed to a new recipe with a new yeast in 2000.

Bottled

Name	ABV	Notes
Moonraker Strong Ale	6.5%	A reddish brown beer.
Manchester Star Ale	7.3%	A dark, strong ale discovered in a recipe book from 1884.
The Governor	4.1%	Amber/auburn beer co-created by Marco Pierre White.
The Governor Lager	3.9%	Continental style lager co-created by Marco Pierre White.
Harvest Ale	11.5%	A barley wine, released in vintages, that was introduced in 1986.

In addition, J.W. Lees brews Ansells Mild and Carlsberg Lager.

== Boilerhouse microbrewery ==
In 2018, the brewery converted their historic boiler house into a microbrewery. Overseen by head brewer Michael Lees-Jones, the boilerhouse allows small batch productions of more unusual and niche beers. Past productions have included a Vanilla White Stout, Chocolate Orange Mild and Strawberry Milkshake IPA.

== Public houses ==
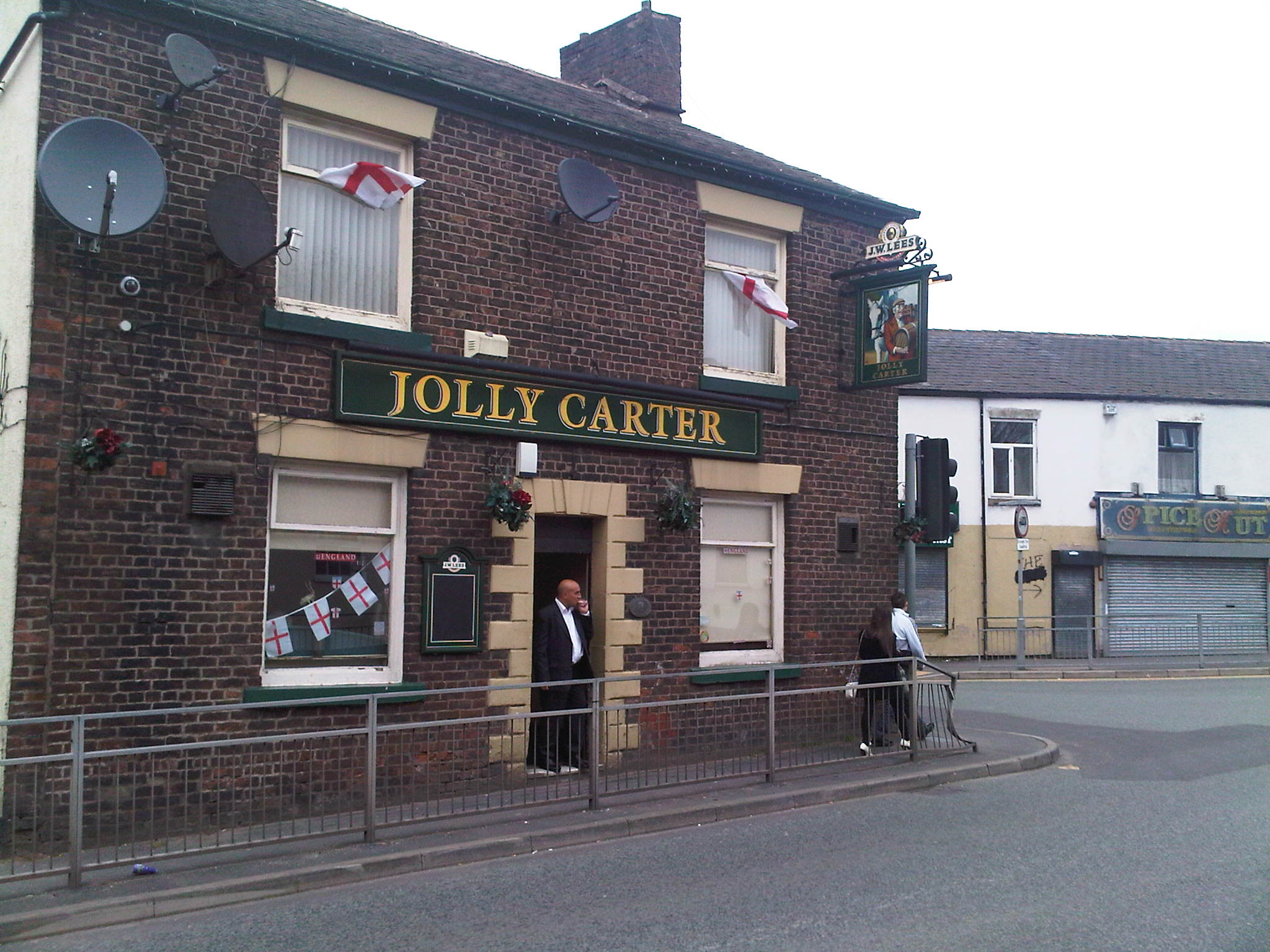
A J.W. Lees pub in Middleton

J.W. Lees has around 150 public houses, inns and hotels, primarily in residential areas in the North West of England and North Wales. All but one of the pubs are freehold. The majority of these are run by tenant landlords, while roughly one third of the houses are managed by the brewery. The core of J.W. Lees' estate is situated in North Manchester and Oldham. This stems from the time of horse drawn dray wagons and how far they might travel in a day. The advent of motor travel allowed the brewery to acquire sites further afield, with the company gradually expanding its pub estate into wider Lancashire, Cheshire, North Wales and Yorkshire. In 2009 J.W. Lees bought ten pubs from Punch Pubs and has continued to steadily grow its estate.

== Inns and hotels ==
J.W. Lees operates a number of inns and hotels including The Alderley Edge Hotel, The Stanneylands Hotel and the Trearddur Bay Hotel.

== Willoughby's Wine Merchants ==
Willoughby's is the name of J.W. Lees' wines and spirits operation. Willoughby's has its own illustrious heritage stemming back to 1850 when it was founded by Frank Stanley Willoughby in Stockport. Willoughby's has grown by acquisition of wine merchants including Thomas Batey and Sons, Duttons of Chester, Scatchards of Liverpool, Yates Brothers of Bolton and Lakeland Vintners in Bowness. In 2012 Willoughby's ceased to operate any retail premises but continues to supply many licensed leisure venues through direct delivery.
