= Steven Hydes =

Abandoned child (born 1986)

Steven Hydes (born 1986), sometimes known as Steve Hydes, was an abandoned baby found at the south terminal of Gatwick airport in the women's bathroom, on 10 April 1986 by a duty-free sales assistant, Beryl Wright. According to the doctors who examined him, he was 10 days old at the time. Hydes was initially named Gary Gatwick after the airport's mascot, a plush toy bear sold in the airport's gift shop that had been given to him by airport staff soon after he was discovered. His case was widely publicised in the UK and elsewhere at the time. He was first placed in foster care and after being adopted was given the name Steven Hydes.

Despite extensive searching by Hydes and others for more than a quarter century, little or no information had turned up about Hydes' origins. Hydes has been featured on several TV programmes and was the subject of a documentary produced by the BBC. In May 2019, Hydes announced on his Facebook page that through help from genetic genealogists he had found his birth family but his biological mother had already died. His biological father and his siblings were unaware of his existence. Years later, in an October 2021 Facebook update post, he shared photos with his biological family and revealed to his followers that he had spent time building a relationship with them.

Hydes resides in Sussex with his partner Sammy and children Alanna and Kian.
