= Charlotte Hodes =

English painter (born 1959)

Charlotte Hodes (born 1959 in London), is a British artist.

She is a Fine Artist living and working in London. Hodes completed a Foundation course at Brighton College of Art (1977–1978), studied Fine Art as an undergraduate student (1978–1982) and Painting as a postgraduate student (1982–1984) at the Slade School of Fine Art, University College, University of London. At the Slade School under the Professorship of Lawrence Gowing, she was a student of Paula Rego, Stanley Jones and John Hoyland.

Hodes’ practice is informed by her experience as a painter and is investigated through large scale papercuts which have been both digitally collaged and intricately hand cut, as well as ornately decorated ceramic vessels, tableware and glass. Her iconography is centred on the female figure within a contemporary context depicted as a silhouette juxtaposed with motifs loaded with female associated references such as the vessel and skirt. Her work questions hierarchies of the female figure as represented in art history, as a decorative motif and as being inextricably linked to the domestic. She draws upon the decorative and applied arts, fashion and costume, often using archives and collections as a source for projects.

Hodes is the only contemporary artist to have been invited to work as an artist at the celebrated ceramic factory Spode (1998–2003). In 2005 she was appointed the first Associate Artist at The Wallace Collection culminating in her solo exhibition ‘ Fragmented Images’ at the museum in 2007. In 2006 she was awarded the Jerwood Drawing Prize and in 2009 held a solo exhibition at Marlborough Fine Art She has participated in many group exhibitions both nationally and internationally including ‘Digital Responses’ Victoria and Albert Museum 2003, ‘Somewhere Totally Else’ Design Biennial, Design Museum London 2003, ‘Glasstress’ Palazzo Cavalli Franchetti 53rdInternational Venice Biennale 2009, ‘Inscription: Thinking/Drawing/Making’ Jerwood Space Gallery London 2010 and in 2012 featured in an exhibition at No.10 Downing Street curated by Janice Blackburn.

Hodes has collaborated with a number of studios and industry including Spode, Park Rose Ceramics Yorkshire, Centre for Fine Art Print, University of West of England, National Glass Centre University of Sunderland, Berengo Studio, Murano and Venice Projects Italy.

Hodes’ work is represented in many public collections including the Victoria and Albert Museum, British Council and Brighton Museum & Art Gallery.

She has lectured at numerous colleges in the UK and in 2006 joined the research department at London College of Fashion, University of the Arts London where she was appointed Professor in Fine Art in 2012.

Hodes founded the Culford Press in 1985 with her husband, the sculptor and printmaker Paul Coldwell at their home in Hackney. She is the daughter of the landscape painter, Joan Hodes who studied at the Slade School (1945–1948) and was a pupil of Oscar Kokoschka.
