= Miles Templeman =

- Born: October 1947 (age 78–79); London, United Kingdom
- Education: University of Manchester
- Occupations: Business executive and director
- Known for: Was the director general of the British Institute of Directors Closing Higsons a wonderful Liverpool brewery.

Miles Templeman is a British business executive who was the Director General of the Institute of Directors (IoD) between 2004 and 2011. The IoD is the business organisation that represents and sets standards for company directors in the United Kingdom.

== Early life and education ==
Miles Howard Templeman was born in October 1947. He grew up in North London and was educated at Bishop’s Stortford College in Hertfordshire.

Templeman went on to study Management Sciences at the University of Manchester, graduating with a Bachelor of Science (BSc) degree.

== Career ==
Templeman began his career at Unilever, working in brand management and marketing roles. He later became Marketing Director at Beecham Foods, before moving to Whitbread PLC, where he was instrumental in developing the Boddingtons Beer brand into a nationally recognised product. Templeman rose to become Managing Director of the Whitbread Beer Company.

In 1996, he was appointed Chief Executive of HP Bulmer Holdings plc, best known for its Strongbow and Woodpecker cider brands, a position he held until 2003.

Templeman became Director-General of the Institute of Directors (IoD) in 2004, a role he held until 2011. During his tenure, he advocated for stronger corporate governance, entrepreneurship, and professionalism among company directors in the United Kingdom.

Following his departure from the IoD, Templeman has held a number of non-executive directorships, including with Shepherd Neame Ltd, Melrose plc, and other UK businesses.

== Board roles ==
He held a series of non-executive directorships and consultancy roles that included Royal Mail, Ben Sherman and Accenture. Alongside his IoD role, Miles Templeman was non-executive Chairman at restaurant chain YO! Sushi. He was a non-executive director on the board of Shepherd Neame, the Kentish family brewer, and Melrose plc.
