= Joan Hodes =

British watercolourist and oil painter (1925–2022)

- Born: 1925; London
- Died: 2022 (aged 96–97); London
- Education: The Slade School of Fine Art, London 1945–48 under Franklin White, Académie Julian and Académie de la Grande Chaumière, Paris 1948–49. She was also a pupil of Oskar Kokoschka from 1947–1953.
- Known for: Watercolour and oil landscape painting
- Movement: Expressionism

Joan Hodes (1925–2022) was a British watercolourist and oil painter, best known for her landscapes of Britain, Ireland, and continental Europe.

== Early life ==
Born in Hampstead, London, in 1925, Joan Blairman was the second daughter of Philip Blairman, an antique dealer, and his wife Celia. Her love of art and mountainous landscapes developed in Llandudno, North Wales, where her family had a holiday home and where they subsequently lived during World War II. At Gloddaeth Hall School for Girls in Llandudno, her artistic skills were encouraged, and at the age of 15, she was awarded certificates from the Royal Drawing Society in 1940. Her family relocated to New York the same year, where she attended Mamaroneck High School, winning a part-time art scholarship in 1942 before returning to Britain in 1943.

== Art training ==
After the war, in 1945, Hodes attended the Slade School of Fine Art, studying under Franklin White and graduating in 1948. Several life drawings from her time at the Slade are held in the UCL Art Museum collection, including a drawing of Quentin Crisp, a frequent life model at art schools in London and the home counties. After graduating from the Slade, Hodes spent a year in Paris at the Académie Julian and the Académie de la Grande Chaumière where she continued to develop her interest in drawing. From 1947 to 1953, the Austrian expressionist Oskar Kokoschka accepted her as one of his small number of pupils while living in London. She recalled his training being 'a revelatory experience', teaching her to look at a subject more intensely as if she were seeing it for the first time, which led to her using a more contrasting palette with broader, bolder brush strokes.

== Style and influences ==
Her early work, a series of pastel drawings and watercolours, owed a lot to Kokoschka's teaching, but later influences included Scottish artists Joan Eardley, Anne Redpath and John Huston. English art historian Michael Kauffman, writing in a solo exhibition catalogue in 1994, felt that her oil paintings also used bold colours in the "manner of Van Gogh". Although Kokoschka's expressionist style is evident in much of her work, where she juxtaposed figurative elements and abstract forms to create depth and a sense of mystery, his influence never compromised the variety of styles she used. Hodes used a number of different media, often in the same work, including pastel, chalk, charcoal, watercolour, and pen and ink, in a limited palette and sometimes sparingly to allow the paper to show through. The Suffolk coast near Aldeburgh, Snape, and Orford was a typical subject for Hodes, who also painted landscapes in Italy, Ireland, and Spain. Hodes' many sketchbooks revealed her desire to make studies en plein air in order to capture the unpredictable conditions of her favourite places: the windswept coasts of Suffolk and the mountains of Ireland, Wales, and the Mediterranean. She sketched out her scenes in situ before returning to her studio to create the final painting.

== Career and reception ==
Beginning with the discipline of her training at the Slade, the subsequent development of her training in Paris, and the inspirational teaching of Kokoschka, Hodes' professional career spanned almost seven decades. Married in 1951 to Dr. Charles Hodes, the couple had three children: Deborah, Matthew, and Charlotte, who is also an artist. During the 1950s, Hodes continued to work, but, with limited time to paint while she raised her family, she produced a series of pastel drawings and watercolour compositions of her children using strong, contrasting colours that had an intimacy without sentimentalising their subject. In the 1960s, as her family grew older, Hodes taught art in secondary and adult education and began to work in oil, concentrating on landscape, mostly in locations she knew well in Britain and Europe.

For her first solo show at the Foyer Gallery in London in 1962, The Connoisseur concluded that "from the interest shown by visitors in the work of this new artist, I predict that Mrs Fairfax-Jones has picked yet another winner. Joan Hodes' work will surely soon appear in the West End".

Wild, open landscapes and her representation of reflections, light, and weather are consistent features in Hodes' compositions, but her bold use of colour is also a recurring theme. In 1970, a critic for Arts Review commented that colour was the primary quality of Joan's work, "where an intensification of observed natural hues gives an almost fauve effect".

At her solo show at the Everyman in 1971, she showed watercolours and pastels depicting the English countryside, not only in the various seasons but also reflecting the ever-changing face of the climate. Arts Review critiqued the show, saying that she caught the sudden showers that come in the summer where sunlight glistens through rain, heightening rather than diminishing the intensity of colour, which suited the free impressionistic style of her work.

In a group exhibition at the Phoenix Gallery in Suffolk in 1987, described as a "lavish display of hedonism and intellect", Hodes was singled out for her work, which was described as "singing colour, with brushwork to match, somewhat akin to the idyllic visions of Bonnard".

== Group membership ==
As a member of the Stone Eye artists group, Hodes was one of the artists in residence at Orford Ness in 2009. The Stone Eye Group comprised a number of Suffolk artists who spent a year trying to capture the landscape in paint and sculpture. They worked at the Orford Ness shingle spit, which was a restricted military testing area for most of the 20th century and which the National Trust opened to the public in 1995. The artists' group was made up of John Barker, Joan Hodes, Heather Hodgson, Ali Hollingsworth, Martin Laurance, and Katharine Roney and they spent over a year sketching and painting on what locals' call 'The Island', although it is connected to the mainland at Aldeburgh, where an exhibition was held in November 2009. Hodes, who lived in Orford, said, "the skies are stunning, and you know all the little bits of wire and all the unexploded ordnance where you're not supposed to go off the path because you'll get blown up? I love all that".

Hodes was a member of the Camden Printmakers. Practising all forms of etching: drypoint, monoprint, intaglio, photo-etching, hard and soft grounds, and pure aquatint, the group started with house exhibitions before progressing to annual shows in local galleries. The group is also involved in the ‘Art for Hospitals' movement at the Royal Free Hospital and University College Hospital.

During her life, Hodes built a community of artist friends in Suffolk and was a member of the Suffolk Group of Artists, formed in 1989.

== Exhibiting history ==
Hodes held her first solo exhibition of colour drawings at the Everyman Foyer Gallery in London in 1962, returning to the gallery in 1971 for a further solo exhibition of watercolours and pastels. Her one-woman London shows have also included the Sue Rankin Gallery in 1986, the Boundary Gallery in 1994, and the Highgate Gallery in 2005. The John Russell Gallery in Ipswich hosted three solo shows in 2000, 2003, and 2005, and Hodes participated in the gallery's group shows from 1999 to 2014. Hodes exhibited three landscapes at the Royal Academy Summer Exhibition in 1972: a still life in 1985 and an etching, Fisherman with Boats, in 2001.

Group shows included the Contemporary Portrait Society, the Victoria and Albert Museum, the Leicester, Mercury, and Ben Uri Galleries, the Hampstead Artists Council, and the Women's International Art Club (WIAC). Hodes was a member of the WIAC from 1971 to 1978, having been introduced to the club by her neighbour and WIAC chair Christiane Kubrick, and served on the club's executive committee from 1972 to 1975.

Her work is included in the following public collections in London: the Royal Free Hospital, the Victoria and Albert Museum, the British Museum, the Slade UCL Art Museum collection, and Paintings in Hospitals.

== Later life ==
Into her nineties, Hodes continued to paint at home, take art classes, and exhibit. She participated in etching classes and group exhibitions at Holmes Rd., Kentish Town, London, initially taught by Peter Frith, RA. Aged 96, Hodes died at her home in Keats Grove, Hampstead, in early 2022, surrounded by her family.

== Solo exhibitions ==
- Everyman Foyer Gallery, London, 1962 & 1971
- Campbell & Franks, London, 1981
- Sue Rankin Gallery, London, 1986
- Boundary Gallery, London, 1994
- West Cork Art Centre, Ireland (sponsored by the British Council), 1995
- Printworks, Colchester, 1996
- John Russell Gallery, Ipswich, 2000, 2004, 2005
- Highgate Gallery, London, 2005

== Selected group exhibitions ==
- Royal Academy 1972, 1985 and 2001
- Mercury Gallery 1971–1985
- Leicester Gallery 1966–1968
- Ben Uri Gallery 1963, 1965, 1969 and 1982
- Contemporary Portrait Society 1963, 1964, 1970 and 1982
- The Women's International Art Club, 1970–1978
- Hampstead Artists' Council 1964–1971
- The Royal Society of British Artists, 1964
- The Society of Women Artists, 1963
- Hampstead Artists' Council 1964–1971
- New Grafton Gallery, 1973

== Collections ==
- The British Museum
- The Victoria and Albert Museum
- The Slade Art Collection, University College London
- The National Trust, Westley Bottom
- The Royal Free Hospital, London
- Paintings in Hospitals, London
