= Manchester Mayfield railway station =

Former railway station in England

Coordinates: 53°28′33″N 2°13′41″W

Mayfield
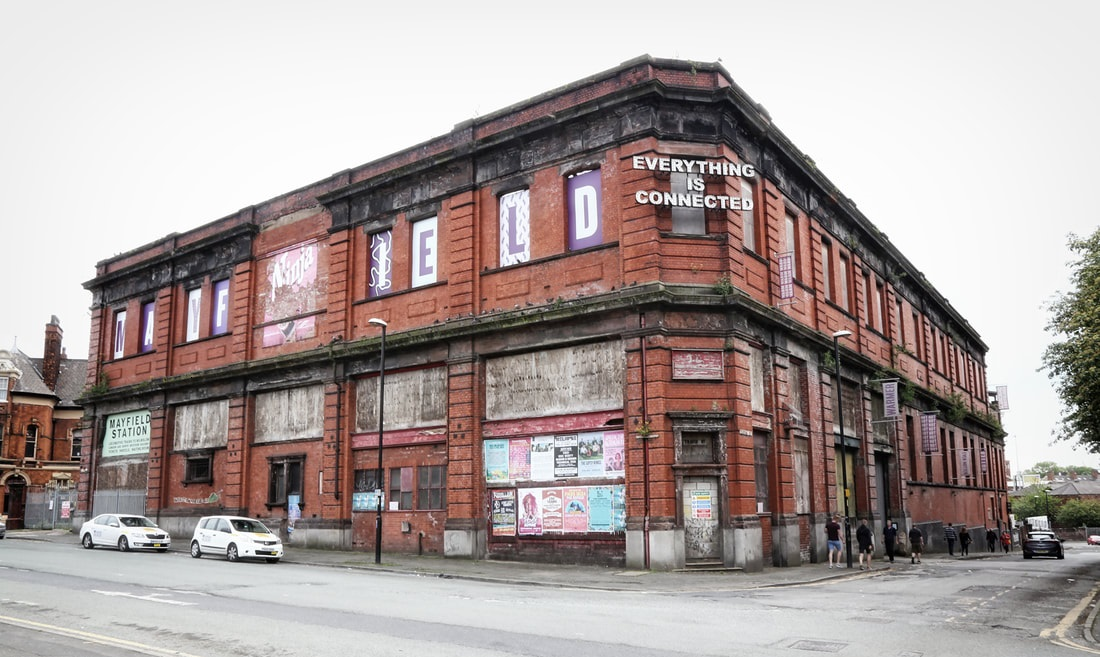
- The exterior of Mayfield station from Baring Street

General information
- Location: Manchester, England
- Grid reference: SJ851976
- Platforms: 4

Other information
- Status: Disused

History
- Original company: London and North Western Railway
- Pre-grouping: London and North Western Railway
- Post-grouping: London, Midland and Scottish Railway; London Midland Region of British Railways

Key dates
- 8 August 1910: Opened
- 28 August 1960: Closed to passengers
- 6 July 1970: Reopened as a parcel depot
- 1986: Closed
Location

Manchester Mayfield is a former railway station in Manchester, England, on the south side of Fairfield Street next to Manchester Piccadilly station. Opened in 1910, Mayfield was constructed as a four-platform relief station adjacent to Piccadilly to alleviate overcrowding. In 1960, the station was closed to passengers and, in 1986, it was permanently closed to all services having seen further use as a parcels depot.

After years of abandonment and many proposed development schemes, the station roof was dismantled in February 2013. The site was used for Manchester International Festival in July 2013.

Manchester Mayfield station and the surrounding 6.2-acre (25,000 m^{2}) site is the property of London and Continental Railways, the residual government-owned corporation and former partner in Eurostar International.

In 2019, some of the site was converted into Depot Mayfield, a cultural venue.

In September 2022, Mayfield Park was opened on the southern part of the site.

== History ==
=== Use as a passenger station ===
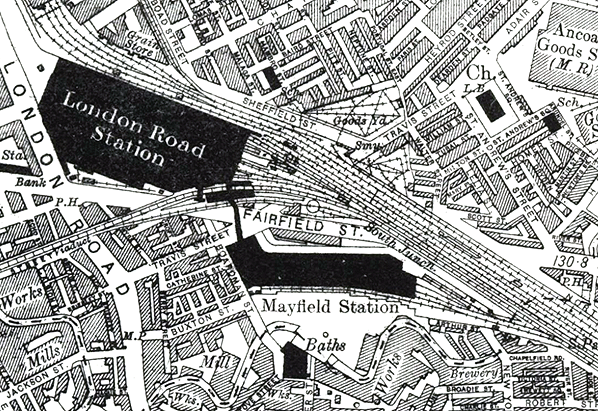
1915 map showing the location of Mayfield (bottom, south of Fairfield Street) relative to London Road station (top). The covered footbridge that linked the two stations is also shown.

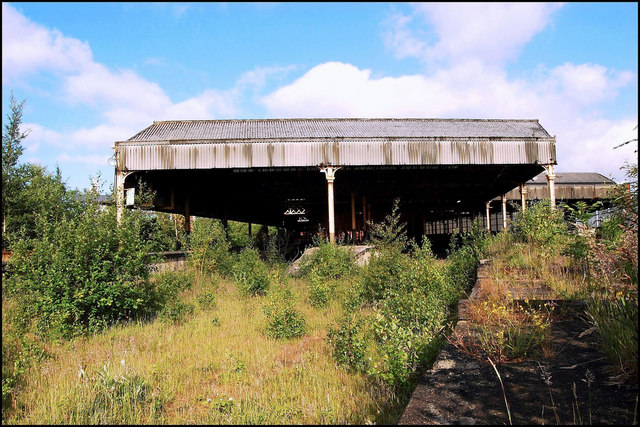
Overgrown station platforms in 2009

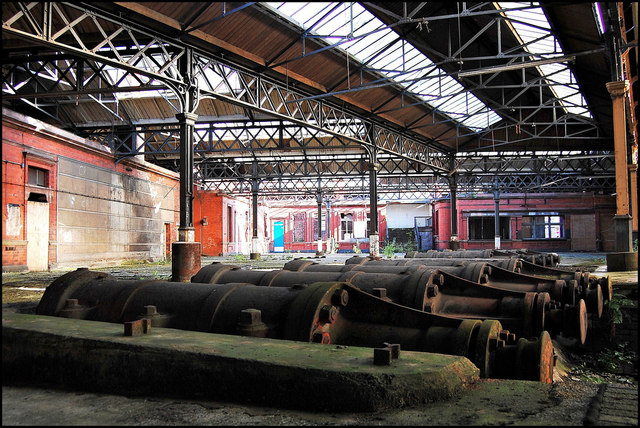
Interior in 2009, showing 1910 buffer stops

Opened on 8 August 1910 by the London and North Western Railway, Manchester Mayfield was built alongside Manchester London Road station (later Piccadilly) to handle the increased number of trains and passengers following the opening of the Styal Line in 1909. The LNWR had considered constructing a new platform at London Road between the MSJAR's platforms 1 and 2, which were renumbered 1 and 3 in anticipation, but this was abandoned in favour of the construction of Mayfield; the platforms nevertheless remained renumbered. Four platforms were provided and passengers could reach London Road via a high-level footbridge. Mayfield suffered the effects of bombing during World War II, when it was hit by a parachute mine on 22 December 1940.

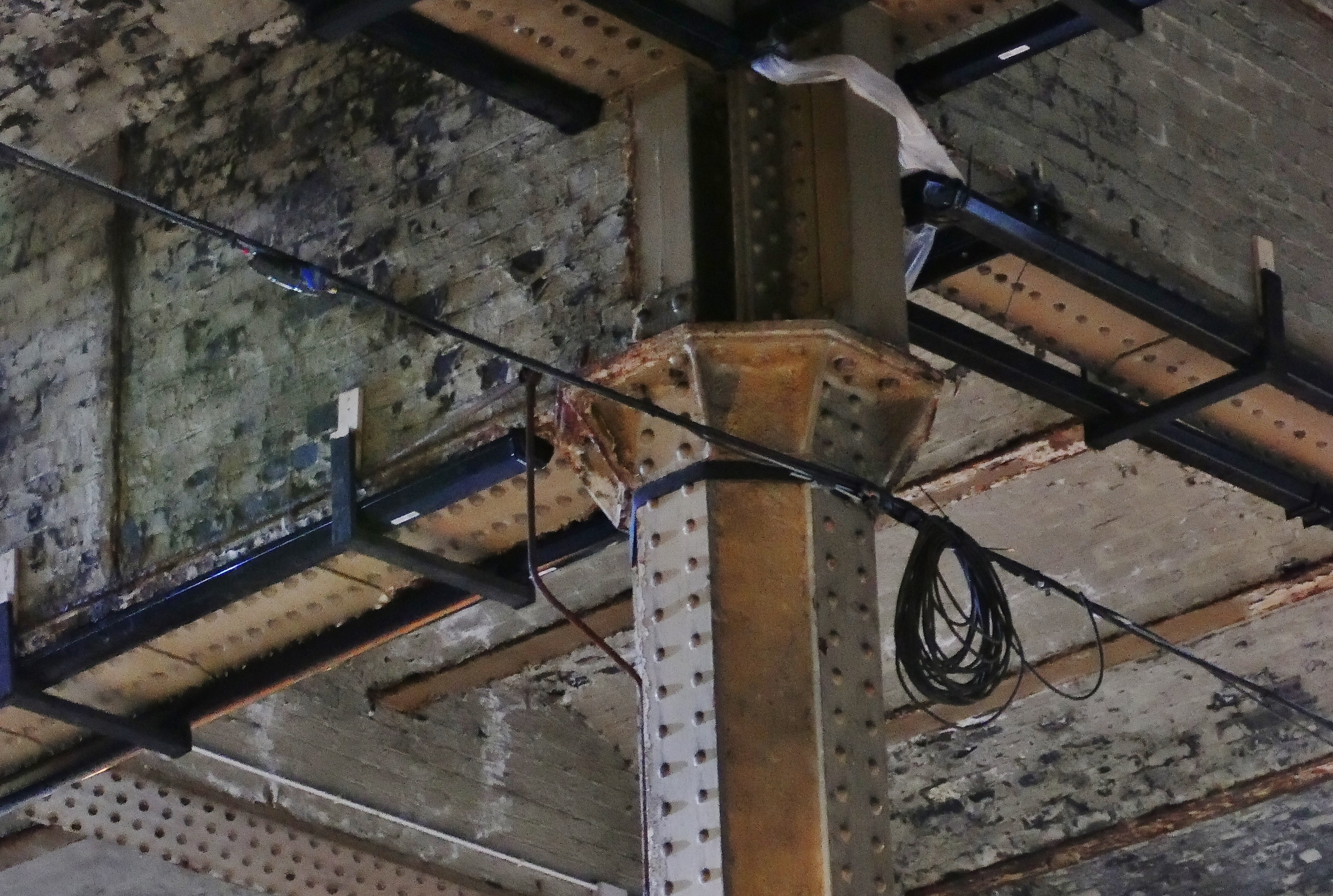
Detail of ironwork in the underplatform warehouse

Mayfield was a relief station, mainly used by extra trains and suburban services to the south of Manchester. For example, in the 1957-58 London Midland Region timetable, there were trains to Cheadle Hulme, Buxton, Alderley Edge, Chelford and Stockport on weekdays. In the London Midland timetable of September 1951, the Pines Express from Bournemouth West is shown as arriving at Mayfield at 4.30pm (16.30) on Mondays to Fridays. On Saturdays, this train used Piccadilly station, then known as London Road. In the 1957-8 timetable, the Pines Express still arrived at Mayfield on Mondays to Fridays, now at the time of 4.45pm (16.45).

It came into its own for a brief period during the electrification and modernisation of what was to become Piccadilly station in the late 1950s, when many services were diverted to it. It was closed to passengers on 28 August 1960.

=== Use as a goods station ===
The site was converted into a parcels depot, which opened on 6 July 1970. Royal Mail constructed a sorting office on the opposite side of the main line and connected it to Mayfield with an overhead conveyor bridge, which crossed the throat of Piccadilly station. The depot closed in 1986, following the decision by Parcelforce, Royal Mail's parcels division, to abandon rail transport in favour of road haulage. The building has remained disused since then, with the tracks into Mayfield removed in 1989, as part of the remodelling of the Piccadilly station layout. The sorting office was briefly reused as an indoor karting track, but has now been rebuilt as the Square One development, prestige offices used by Network Rail; the parcel conveyor bridge was removed in 2003.

=== Disuse ===
The site is the property of London and Continental Railways. The interior of the station was used in Prime Suspect as a drug dealer's haunt. It was also used as a double for Sheffield railway station in The Last Train. The roadside building was gutted by a fire in 2005.

== Future ==
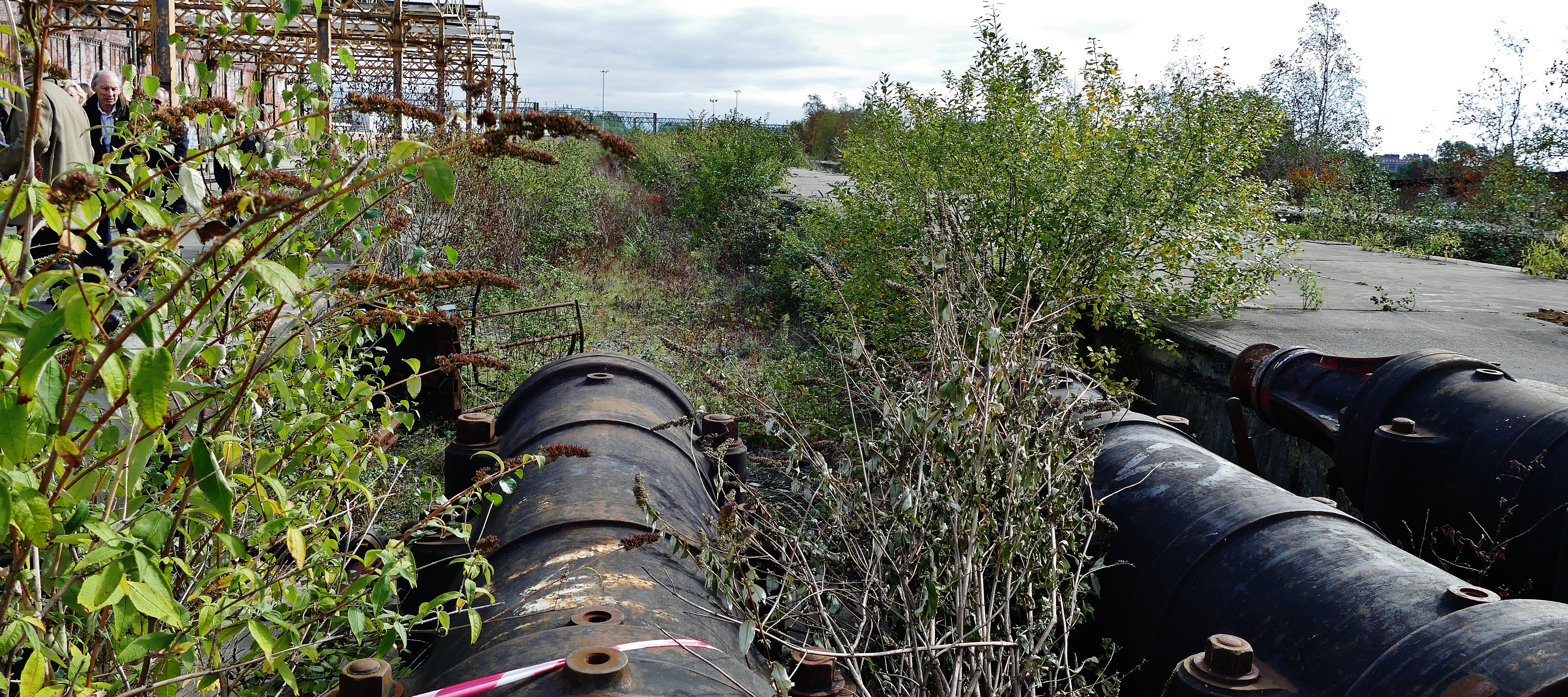
Original buffers to be preserved

=== Reopening as a station ===
A study was carried out by Mott MacDonald in 2000, which looked at possibilities of increasing capacity at the Piccadilly station. One solution put forward would see the track quadrupled between Slade Lane Junction and Piccadilly, with a pair of through platforms in the Mayfield goods yard to the south of Piccadilly's platforms 13 and 14 linked to additional running lines to Ashburys station. This proposal was supported by the Greater Manchester Passenger Transport Executive as it would increase usable train paths through Piccadilly by between 33% and 50%; the extra track would, however, require an expensive extension to the Piccadilly-Deansgate viaduct carrying the track from Slade Lane. The location of the proposed platforms was also criticised, as it would entail "a long walk for passengers wishing to interchange with other terminating rail services at Manchester Piccadilly or access the city centre."

Other options would have the station used again as a terminus, providing a rail link to Manchester Airport or, alternatively, the lines might be extended through Mayfield and connected to the existing line to Manchester Oxford Road railway station.

Further proposals were put forward in 2009 by the Greater Manchester Integrated Transport Authority for reinstating Mayfield as an operational station, to alleviate capacity problems at Piccadilly Station. However, as part of the Northern Hub railway development scheme across Northern England, Network Rail now plans to increase capacity on the existing Oxford Road-Piccadilly route by widening the viaducts and adding two additional platforms (15 and 16) to the south side of Piccadilly station. There are no plans to re-open Mayfield station for public transport.

=== Commercial redevelopment ===
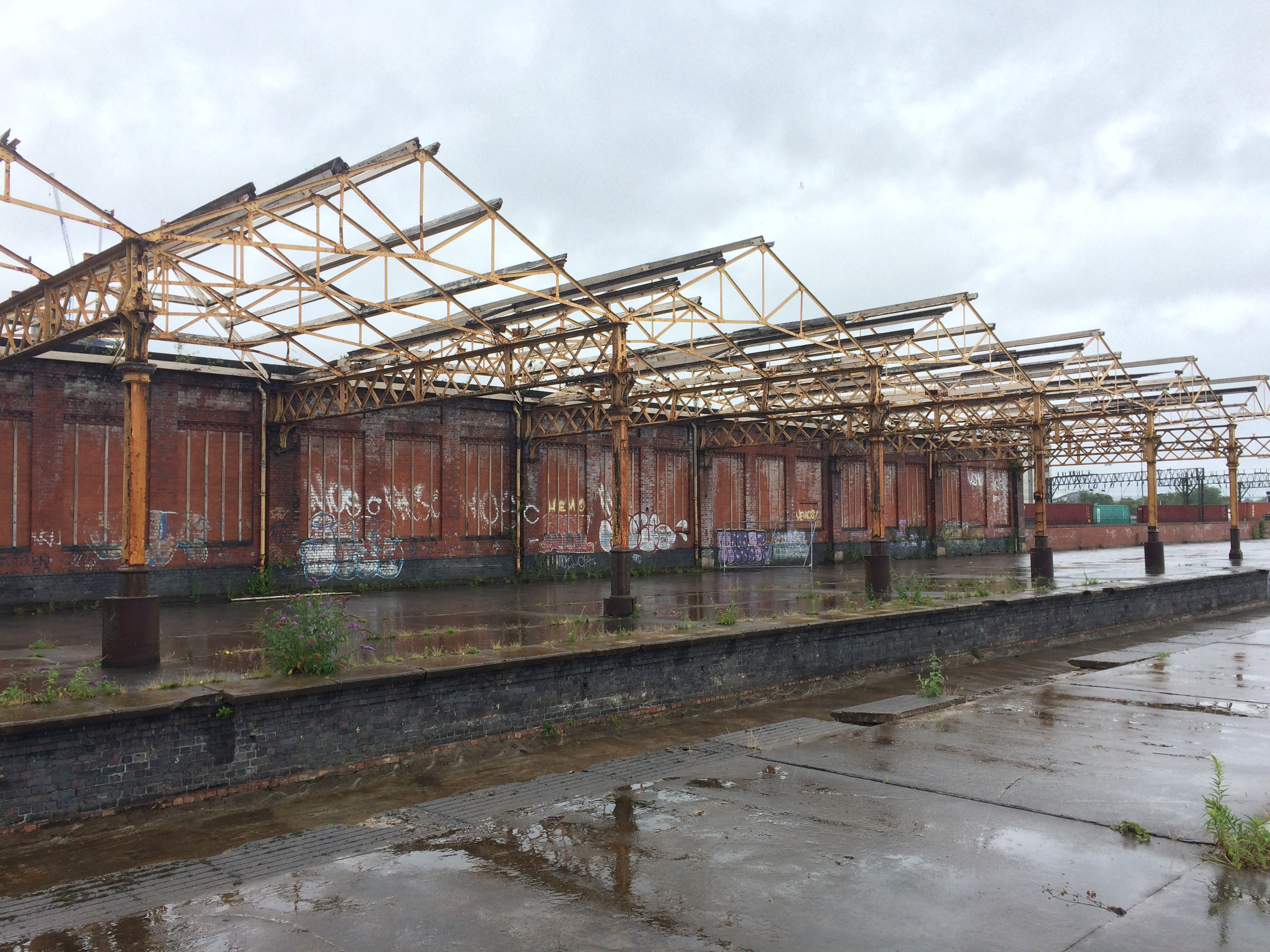
Remains of the station canopy in 2020, having been mostly removed in March 2013 due for safety following the fire

In 2008, an alternative scheme involving Manchester Mayfield was put forward. This proposal would see the station as part of a new 30-acre (120,000 m^{2}) city centre district immediately adjacent to Piccadilly Station. This project would create over 6,000,000 square feet (560,000 m^{2}) of offices contained in office blocks up to 12 storeys high, and would be completed over a period of 15 years. The scheme is led by "Mayfield Manchester", a joint venture company between Ringset, part of the Wrather Group, and Panamint; the company owns around 90% of the land around the station as of 2008, but do not own the station itself. The future of the former railway station has yet to be decided and Mayfield Manchester were, as of April 2008, said to be in talks with its owners, BRB Residuary.

=== Conversion into coach station ===
It has been reported that the station could eventually be converted into a new National Express coach station which would be relocated from its existing facility on Chorlton Street and rebuilt on the western end of the Mayfield Goods Yard with pedestrian links to Piccadilly. A new coach station would be adjacent to the Inner Ring Road and have easy access to the road network.

=== Government offices ===
In a proposal floated in May 2009, the Labour government were said to have earmarked the site as the location of a 700,000 sq ft (65,000 m^{2}) "super-campus" to house 5,000 civil servants. The construction of the building, if it had been approved by the Treasury, would have commenced in 2012–2013 and required the demolition of Mayfield station.

=== Entertainment venue ===
In November 2013, a planning application was made for conversion of the station to an arts and entertainment venue with a maximum capacity of up to 7,500 people. The application was later withdrawn.

In 2019, some of the site was converted into Depot Mayfield, a 10,000 capacity venue for culture located at Manchester's historic former railway Mayfield as part of a £1 billion regeneration project. It regularly hosts The Warehouse Project, a series of club nights.

=== Demolition ===
The Mayfield area has been specified as an urban regeneration area and it is proposed to replace the station with offices and residential developments, along with a revived proposal to relocate Whitehall government departments to the area. The wider project for the regeneration of Piccadilly station in anticipation of the construction of the HS2 line to Manchester envisages a major redevelopment of Piccadilly station and the Mayfield area, involving the demolition of both Mayfield station and Gateway House. However the status of this is now unknown due to the cancellation of the HS2 Manchester leg.
