= Widget (beer) =

Device placed in cans and bottles of beer to aid in the generation of froth

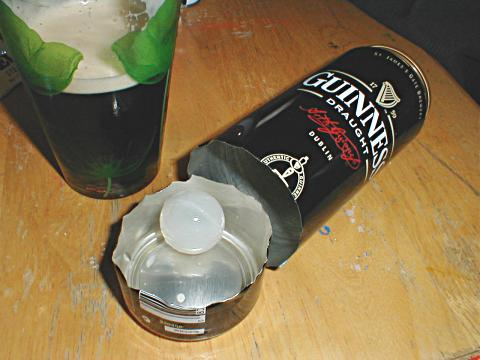
Guinness floating widget

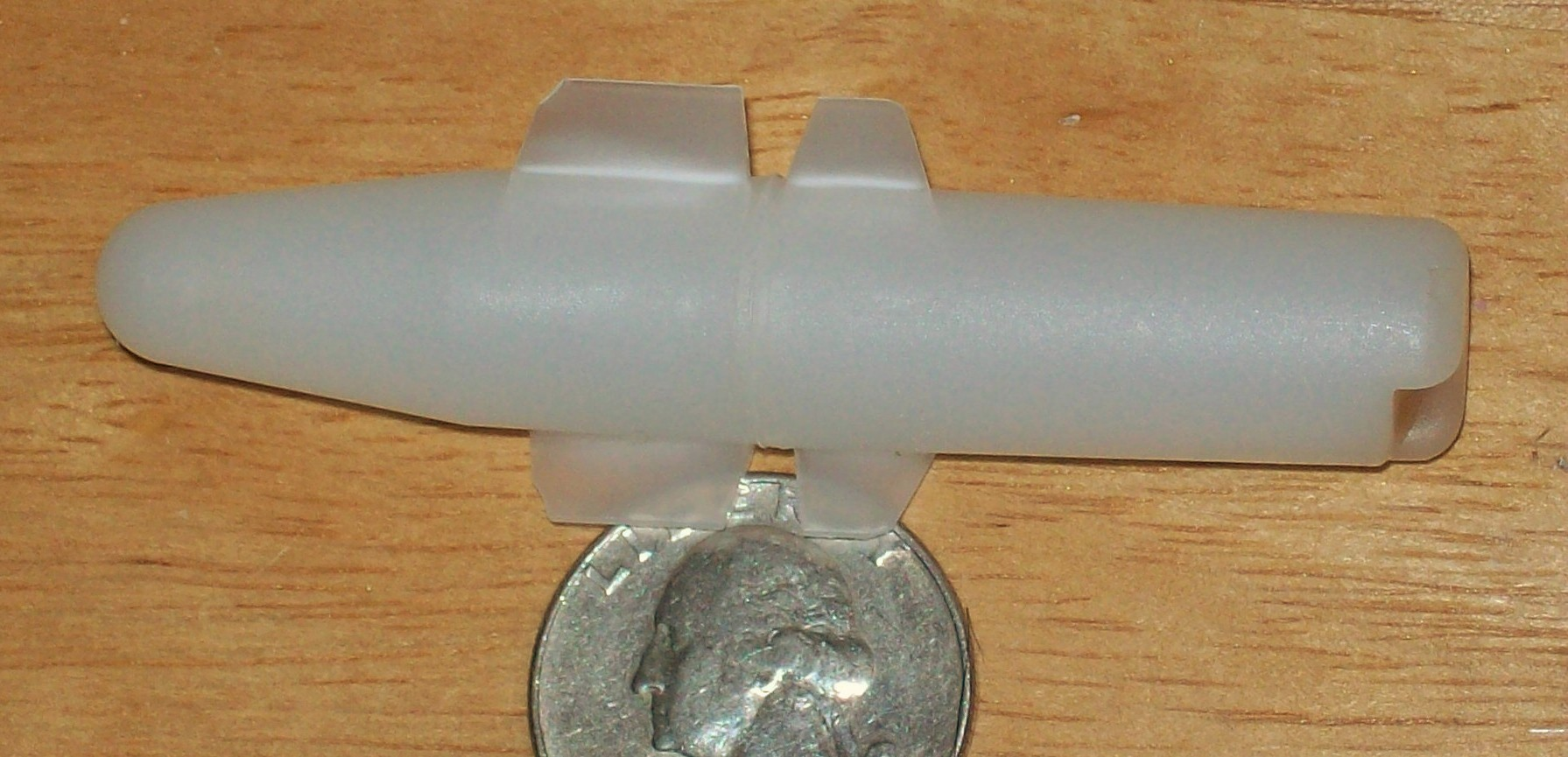
Guinness beer bottle widget

A widget is a device placed in a container of beer to manage the characteristics of the beer's head. The original widget was patented in Ireland by Guinness. The "floating widget" is found in cans of beer as a hollow plastic sphere, approximately 3 centimetres (1.2 in) in diameter (similar in appearance to a table tennis ball, but smaller) with two small holes and a seam. The "rocket widget" is found in bottles, 7 centimetres (2.8 in) in length with the small hole at the bottom.

== Background ==
Draught Guinness, as it is known today, was first produced in 1959. With Guinness keen to produce draught beer packaged for consumers to drink at home, Bottled Draught Guinness was formulated in 1978 and launched into the Irish market in 1979. It was never actively marketed internationally as it required an "initiator" device, which looked rather like a syringe, to make it work.

== Method ==
Some canned beers are pressurized by adding liquid nitrogen, which vaporises and expands in volume after the can is sealed, forcing gas and beer into the widget's hollow interior through a tiny hole—the less beer inside the widget the better, for subsequent head quality. In addition, some nitrogen dissolves in the beer, which also contains dissolved carbon dioxide. Oxygen is generally excluded as its presence can cause flavour deterioration.

The presence of dissolved nitrogen allows smaller bubbles to be formed, which increases the creaminess of the head. This is because the smaller bubbles need a higher internal pressure to balance the greater surface tension, which is inversely proportional to the radius of the bubbles. Achieving this higher pressure would not be possible with just dissolved carbon dioxide, as the greater solubility of this gas compared to nitrogen would create an unacceptably large head.

When the can is opened, the pressure in the can quickly drops, causing the pressurised gas and beer inside the widget to jet out from the hole. This agitates the surrounding beer, creating a chain reaction of bubble formation throughout the beer. The result, when the can's content is then poured, is a surging mixture in the glass of very small gas bubbles and liquid.

This is the case with certain types of draught beer such as draught stouts. In the case of these draught beers, which before dispensing also contain a mixture of dissolved nitrogen and carbon dioxide, the agitation is caused by forcing the beer under pressure through small holes in a restrictor in the tap. The surging mixture gradually settles to produce a very creamy head.

== Development ==
Expired British Patent No 1266351, filed 27 January 1969

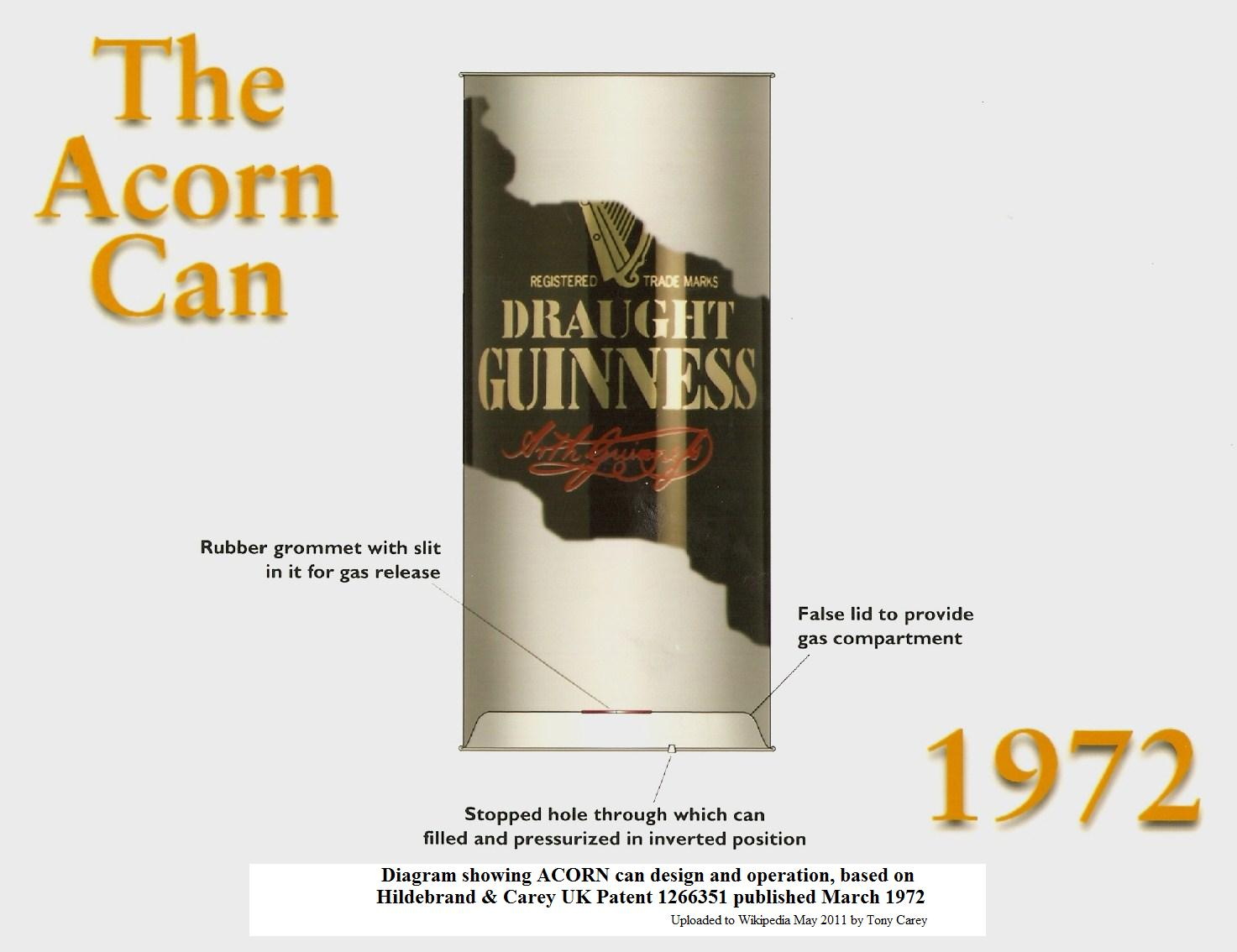
Diagram of Acorn Can

In 1969, two Guinness brewers at Guinness's St James's Gate Brewery in Dublin, Tony Carey and Sammy Hildebrand, developed a system for producing draught type Guinness from cans or bottles through the discharge of gas from an internal compartment. It was patented in British Patent No 1266351, filed 27 January 1969, with a complete specification published 8 March 1972.

Development work on a can system under Project ACORN (Advanced Cans Of Rich Nectar) focused on an arrangement whereby a false lid underneath the main lid formed the gas chamber (see diagram below right).

Technical difficulties led to this approach being put on hold, and Guinness instead concentrated on bottles using external initiators. Subsequently, Guinness allowed this patent to lapse and it was not until Ernest Saunders centralised the company's research and development in 1984 that work restarted on this invention, under the direction of Alan Forage.

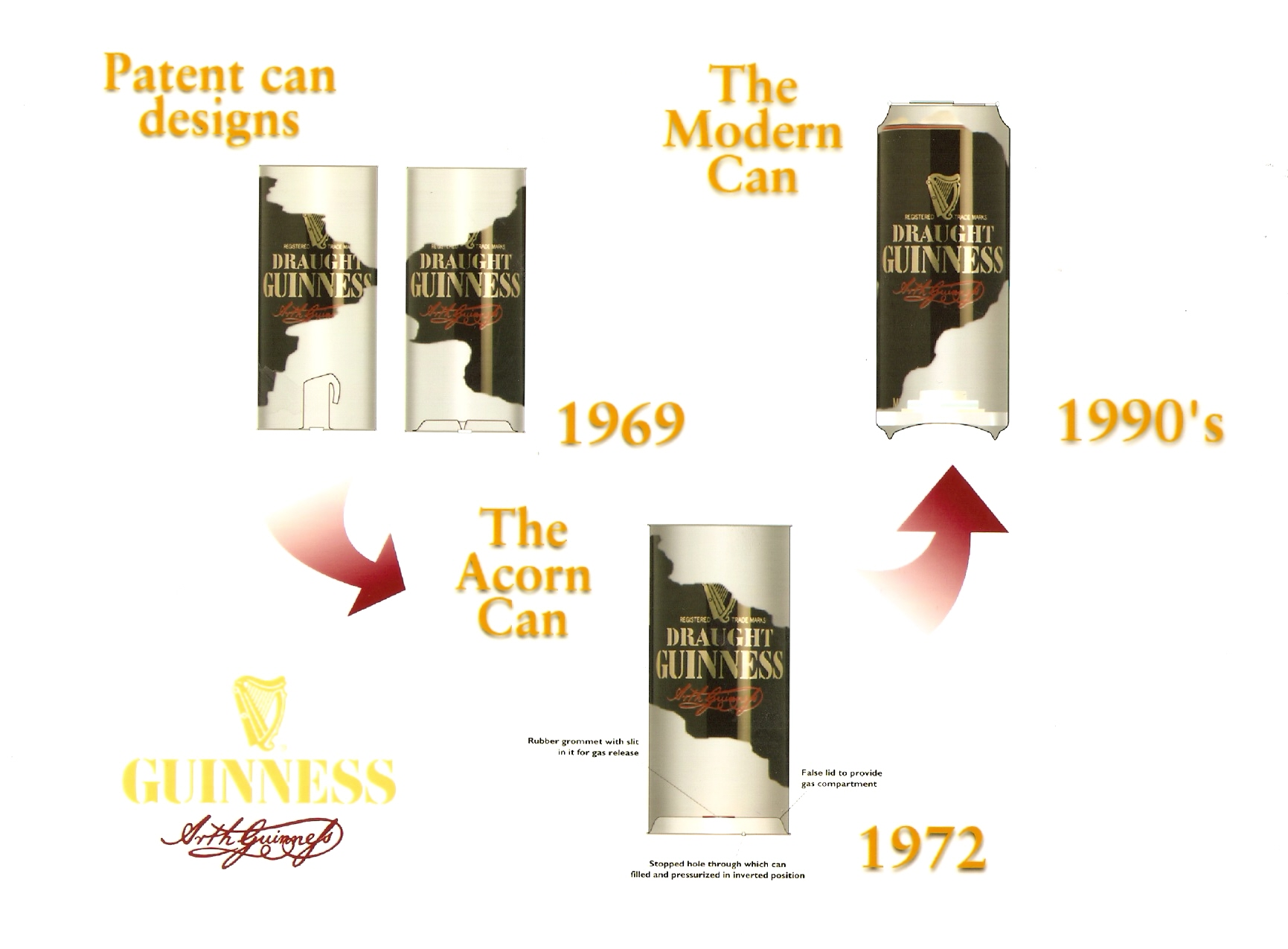
Development sequence for canned draught Guinness

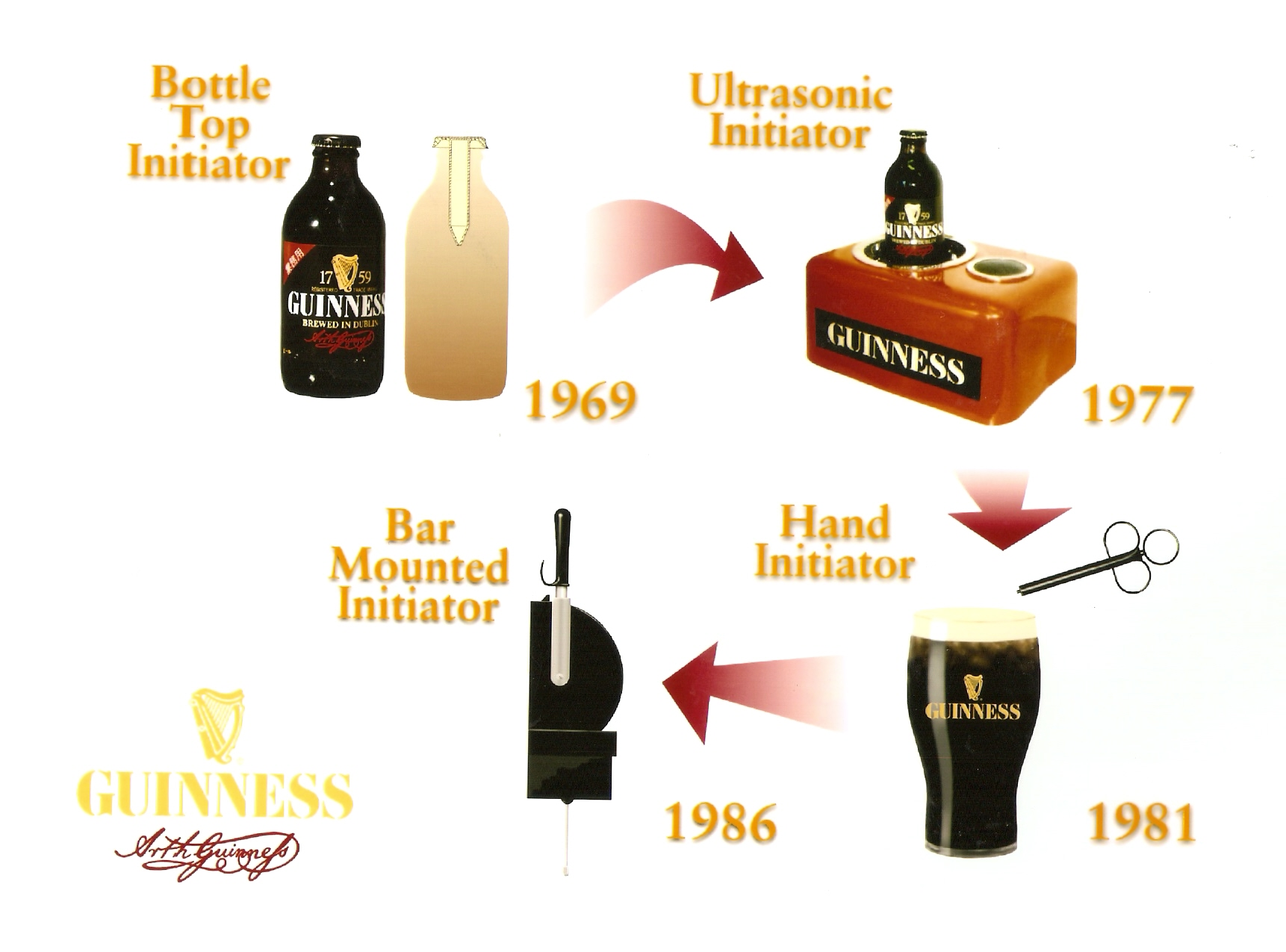
Development sequence for bottled draught Guinness

The design of an internal compartment that could be readily inserted during the canning process was devised by Alan Forage and William Byrne, and work started on the widget during the period 1984–85. The plan was to introduce a plastic capsule into the can, pressurise it during the filling process and then allow it to release this pressure in a controlled manner when the can was opened. This would be sufficient to initiate the product and give it the characteristic creamy head. However, Tony Carey observed that this resulted in beer being forced into the widget during pressurisation, which reduced the quality of the head. He suggested overcoming this by rapidly inverting the can after the lid was seamed on. This extra innovation proved successful.

The first samples sent to Dublin were labelled "Project Dynamite", which caused some delay before customs and excise would release the samples. Because of this the name was changed to Oaktree in recognition of the earlier ACORN project. Another name that changed was "inserts"; the operators called them "widgets" almost immediately after they arrived on site, a name that has now stuck with the industry.

The development of ideas continued and more than one hundred alternatives were considered. The blow-moulded widget was to be pierced with a laser and a blower was then necessary to blow away the plume created by the laser burning through the polypropylene. This was abandoned and instead it was decided to gas-exchange air for nitrogen on the filler, and produce the inserts with a hole in place using straightforward and cheaper injection-moulding techniques.

Commissioning began January 1988, with a national launch date of March 1989. This first-generation widget was a plastic disc held in place by friction in the bottom of the can. This method worked fine if the beer was served cold; when served warm the can would overflow when opened. The floating widget, which Guinness calls the "Smoothifier", was launched in 1997 and does not have this problem.

The diagrams on the left show the development sequences for canned and bottled draught Guinness from 1969 to 1988.

The idea for the widget soon became popular. John Smith's started to include widgets in their cans in 1994 and many beer brands in the UK now use widgets, often alongside regular carbonated products.

Technology from Ball Corp. uses a widget affixed to the bottom of a can that's also charged with nitrogen during canning.

== Beer glass widget ==
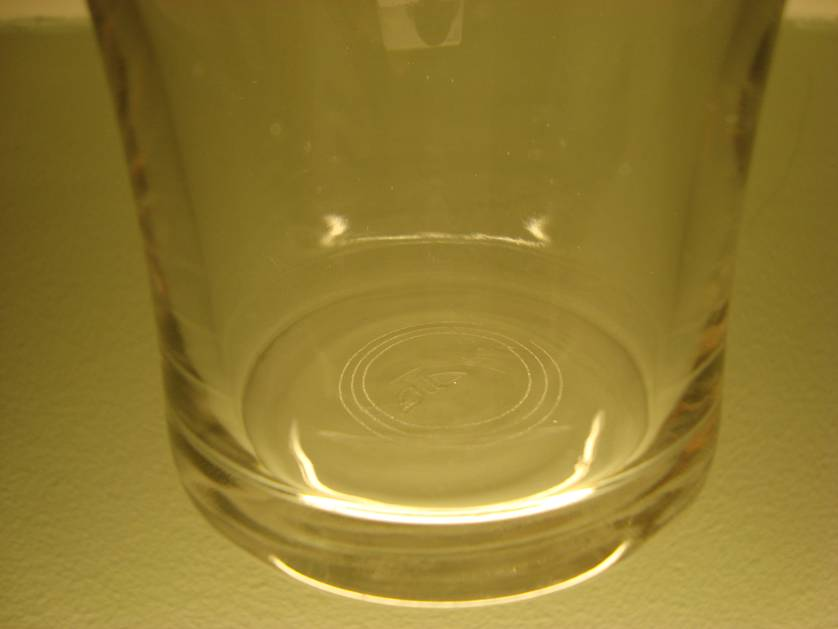
Circular widget etched in the base of a standard pint glass

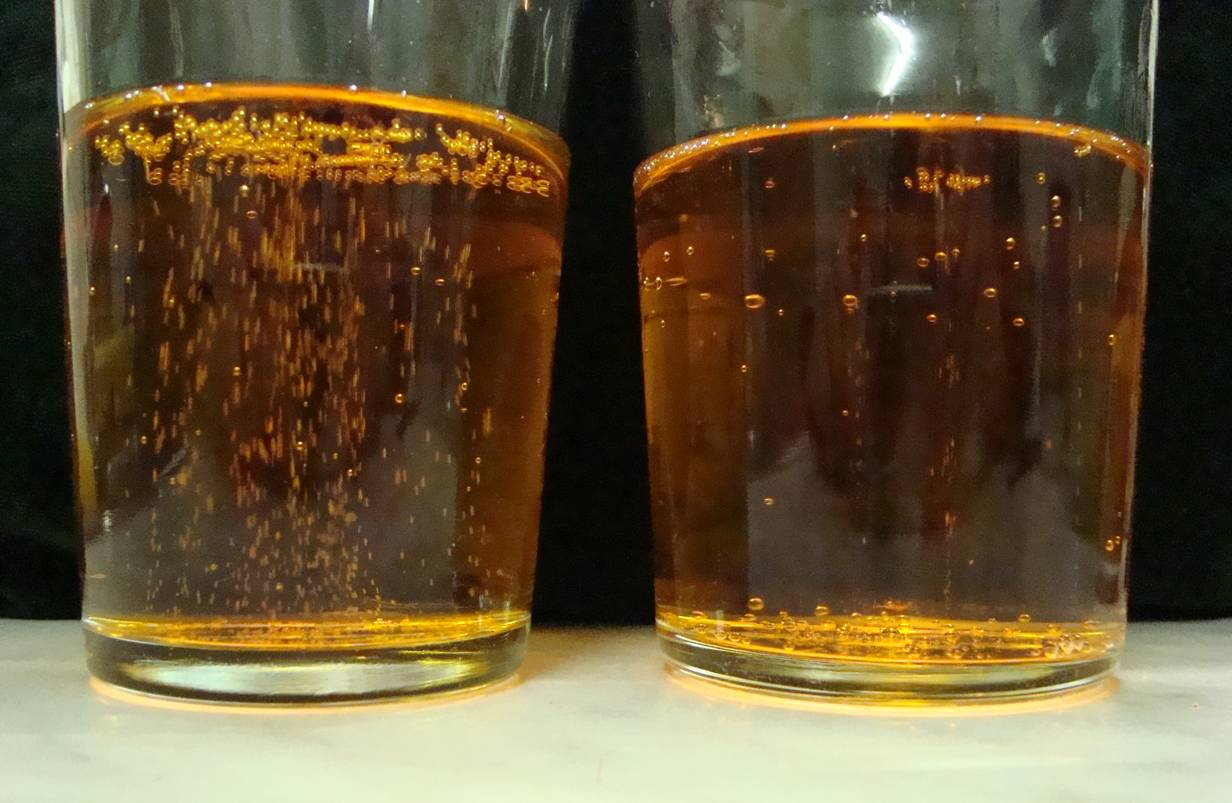
Comparison of bubbles formed in a glass containing a widget (left) and one with a smooth base (right)

The term widget glass can be used to refer to a laser-engraved pattern at the bottom of a beer glass which aids the release of carbon dioxide bubbles. The pattern of the etching can be anything from a simple circular or chequered design to a logo or text.

The widget in the base of a beer glass works by creating a nucleation point, allowing the CO_{2} to be released from the liquid which comes into contact with it, thus assisting in maintaining head on the beer. This has become increasingly popular with Fosters, Estrella and others using them in public houses in the UK.

== Bibliography ==
- Carey & Hildebrand, Improved method of and means for dispensing carbonated liquids from containers, UK Patent 1266351, published 8 March 1972—the original invention behind the modern widget.
- Forage, et al., "Beverage package and a method of packaging a beverage containing gas in solution". United States Patent 4,832,968. 23 May 1989.
