= Strangeways Brewery =

Brewery in Manchester, England

Coordinates: 53°29′21″N 2°14′40″W

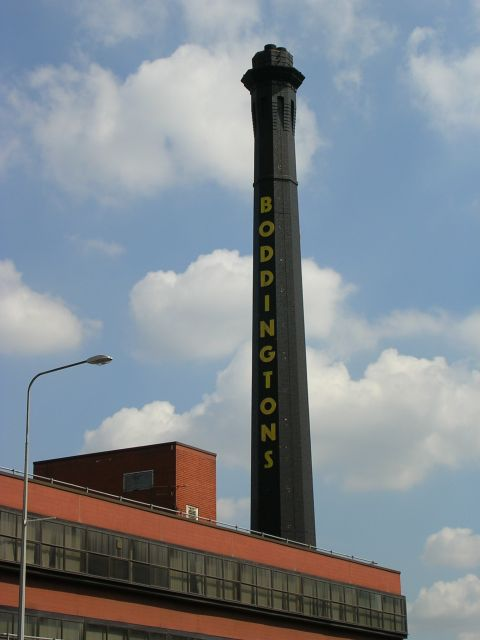
The chimney of Strangeways Brewery, seen here in 2005.

Strangeways Brewery was a landmark in Manchester, England, just north of the city centre, which was famous as the home of Boddingtons Bitter. It closed in 2005 and was demolished in 2007.

== History ==
The Strangeways Brewery was founded by two grain merchants, Thomas Caister and Thomas Fry in the late 18th century. The last family chairman Ewart Boddington sold the company to Whitbread in 1989. Whitbread sold their brewing business to InBev in 2000 who ended production at the brewery in 2005. The brewery was used as a venue for a series of club nights, known as The Warehouse Project, until 31 December 2006.
