= Hydes Brewery =

Brewery in Salford, Greater Manchester, England

Hydes
- Industry: Brewing
- Founded: 1863; 163 years ago
- Headquarters: Salford, Greater Manchester, England
- Products: Beer
- Website: hydesbrewery.com

Hydes is a family-owned and managed brewery in Salford, Greater Manchester, England. The company has been brewing real ales since 1863. It owns more than 50 managed and tenanted pubs, mainly in North West England.

== History ==
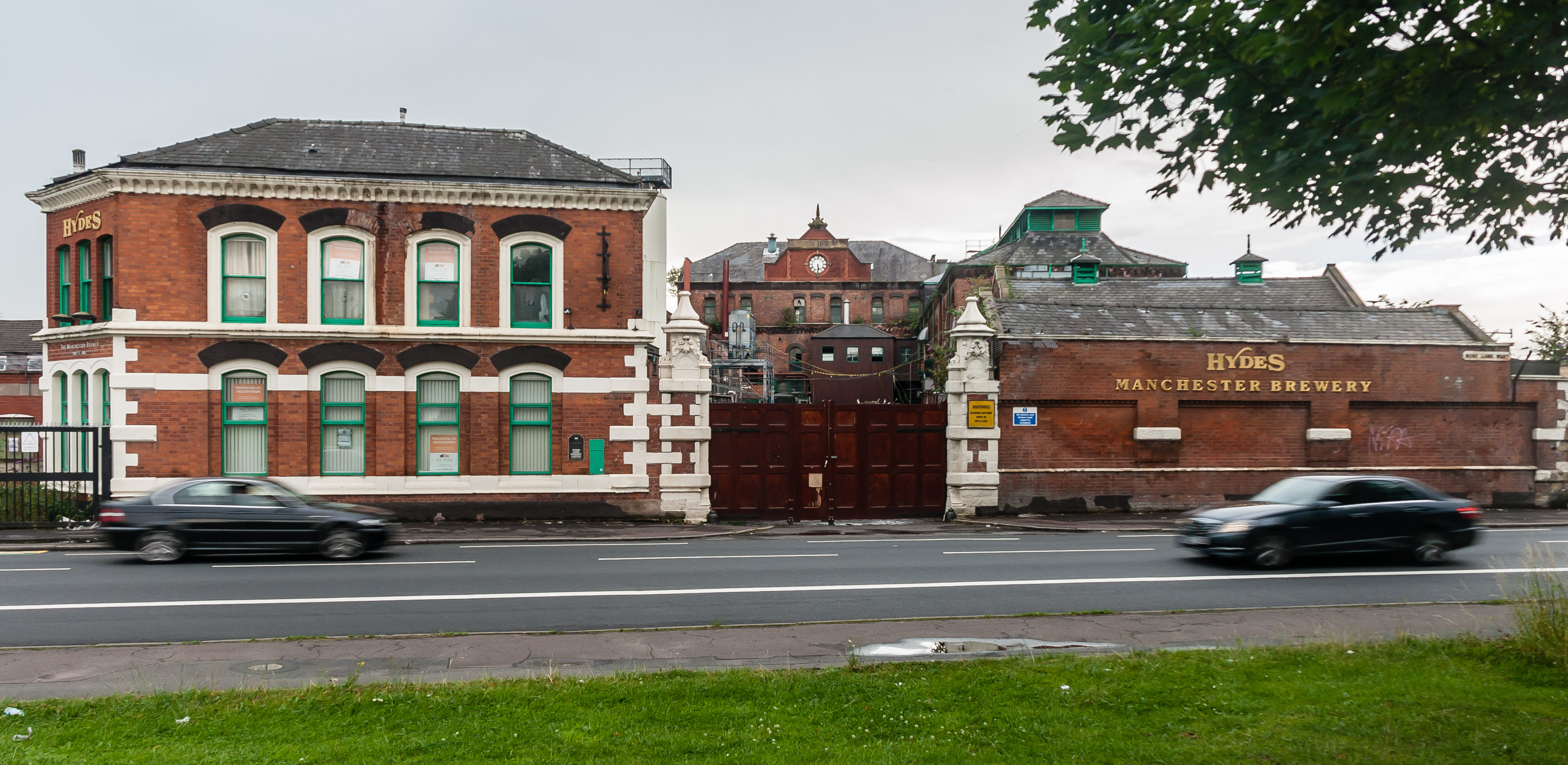
Former Hydes Brewery in Moss Side, Manchester, 2014

Alfred and Ralph Hyde inherited a small brewery from their grandfather in 1863. In 1899, William Hyde acquired the Queen's Brewery in Moss Side, Manchester, and began building up an estate of tied public houses. In 1944, the company was renamed Hydes Anvil Brewery after its trademark. Hydes moved from Moss Side to a new site in Salford in 2012.

== Regular beers ==
- Original Bitter
- Lowry Premium Bitter
- 1863 Light Mild
- Dark Ruby Dark Mild

== Seasonal beers ==
Hydes brews six seasonal beers, each available for two months every year. For 2007, the theme was musical ("Inn Tune With Hydes"), consisting of:

- Jumpin' Jack, a 4.7% abv Winter ale (Jan–Feb),
- Vertigo, a 4.2% abv Amber ale (Mar–Apr),
- Golden Brown, a 4.4% abv Summer ale (May–Jun),
- Summertime Blue, 4.1% abv Summer ale (Jul–Aug),
- Thriller, a 4.5% abv autumn Bitter (Sept–Oct),
- Atomic, a 4.9% abv Winter ale (Nov–Dec).

Past themes have taken inspiration from different areas, with the theme for 2006 coming from the world of cinema:

- Free Spirit, 4.8% abv (Jan–Feb),
- Heavenly Draft, 4.2% abv (Mar–Apr),
- Dr's Orders, 4.4% abv (May–Jun),
- Cutty Shark, 4.1% abv (Jul–Aug),
- Hidden Treasure, 4.5% abv (Sept–Oct),
- Stormtrooper, 5.0% abv (Nov–Dec).

In 2000, the theme was less clear, with the seasonal beers consisting of:

- Harry Vederchi, 4.8% abv (Jan–Feb),
- Clever Endeavour, 4.5% abv (Mar–Apr),
- Hair Raid, 4.2% abv (May–Jun),
- Your Bard, 4.0% abv (Jul–Aug),
- Henry's Hampton, 4.4% abv (Sept–Oct),
- Rocket Fuel, 5.0% abv (Nov–Dec).
