= Cold liquor tank =

In the brewery industry liquor is a term used to refer to water for use in the brewing process. A Cold Liquor Tank is therefore a tank filled with cold process water as seen in breweries. These tanks are often needed because breweries operate as Batch production processes rather than Continuous production processes. This means the production rates of water (liquor) are often insufficient for the point loading requirements of the processes. Cold liquor tanks are used as buffer storage for this purpose such that water production rates are sufficient on average.

The specific use case for a Cold Liquor Tank as opposed to other tanks holding the same quality of water in a brewery is that it holds the water which will be used to cool Wort after it has been through the brew kettle or copper vessel (a brew kettle is a boiling vessel used to break open complex sugars into simpler sugars). The wort temperature needs to be reduced to a temperature suitable for yeast to consume the sugars and produce alcohol via the fermentation process.

The cold liquor is referred to as hot liquor after it has been used to cool the wort and is then fed back into the brewing process earlier in the brewery. The hot liquor is stored in hot liquor tanks before usage.

== Cold liquor tank primary purpose ==
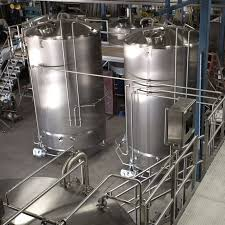
cold liquor tank

Because of the batch nature of brewing processes it would be costly to purchase equipment which can make water at the rate of point usage in comparison to making suitable water continuously at a lower rate which is a sufficient overall volume for the usage when it is needed. One aspect that helps with this assessment is that there are other processes in a brewery which require water. One such process is blending high concentration beer down to the sales concentration after it has been filtered. If all of these point uses were to coincide the required production would be at significant excess to the possible production rate. For this reason there are buffer tanks throughout a brewery at different qualities for different purposes. The DeAerated Water (DAW) or DeAerated Liquor (DAL) tank is another example of this and all of these tanks combined help to level out the water production demand.

== Wort Cooler ==
The wort cooler is a heat exchanger used for cooling wort down to a temperature suitable for fermentation and is usually a two stage plate heat exchanger design. These can either use three or four fluids referred to as either secondary or ternary plate heat exchanger systems.

The two stages of the heat exchangers are the initial wort-cold liquor stage and the final wort-refrigerant stage. From cold liquor usually in the ambient temperature range (typically 10-20°C), the initial stage can create hot liquor in the 80-92°C range which is a useful product stream in an industrial environment. Plate heat exchangers like other heat exchangers are not 100% efficient. The resulting wort from the first stage will therefore not be at the required wort temperature which is also in the 10-20°C range. A secondary stage is therefore needed to trim the wort temperature down to the desired wort temperature. The exact temperatures will vary for a given brewery and a given yeast.

The difference between a secondary and ternary heat exchanger is that a secondary heat exchanger will do the heat transfer between the product and the cooling medium (wort-refrigerant) and a ternary heat exchanger will do the heat transfer using an intermediary fluid (Wort-intermediary-refrigerant). The decision for this is based on the safety and quality control procedures within an individual brewery for a given heat exchanger. This is because the refrigerants used are often poisonous or harmful to humans though there are refrigerants which are safe for use such as high percentage (40-60%) alcohol solutions (dilution of the beer to the correct percentage happens after fermentation). The risk involved is that plate heat exchangers can get small holes in the individual plates due to wear and tear from the highly turbulent fluid streams. Refrigerants will then leak into the process stream if the pressure on the coolant side is higher than the pressure on the process side and vice versa.

== Water (liquor) quality ==
The quality of water used for this application in cold liquor tanks can differ drastically between breweries across the world.

The volumes of water involved often require a large supply of water which will dictate the source of water. Typically this will be ground water drawn up from below the brewery though it might also be a river water source where this is not a viable solution. A public utility water supply might also be one source though often chemicals are added which can present a challenge to its usage.

Depending on the source of the water it will go through different processes to make it suitable for use. This can involve filtration systems like membrane filtration which can produce water too pure for the process. If this is the case often additives will be added back into the water to produce an environment suitable for good yeast propagation or for a desirable taste in the finished product.

A town in the United Kingdom called Burton upon Trent has ground water which was known to produce good flavoured beers and as such the term "Burtonification" or "Burtonisation" has been used to describe the process of producing water to a similar quality as the ground water of the town. This is only one example of a water quality target that might be used by an individual brewery for their desired flavour profile in the end product.

== Temperature Regulation ==
The storage temperature and usage of the hot liquor tanks is something which is an important balance within a brewery. This is particularly the case where the brewery does not operate 24/7. Many breweries operate 24/6 or some other variation which leaves the generated hot liquor to sit and cool down over the period of plant downtime. This reduction in temperature can cause the brewhouse to struggle when starting back up as they try to reach the desired temperatures. For this reason the temperature recovery within the system is an important and well monitored condition of the brewery. Steam coils within the hot liquor tank can be used to maintain the temperature during downtimes. Other methods of maintaining the temperature are recirculation loops through steam plate heat exchangers. Hot liquor tanks are often double skinned insulated vessels.

The temperature of the cold liquor tank is the other side of this equation where the temperature being higher is bad for the heat exchanger efficiency but good for the overall temperature of hot liquor generated within the wort cooler. Keeping the tanks cool also helps to reduce the refrigerant usage as the wort can be lowered to a temperature closer to the required temperature for the yeast with just the cold liquor. Typically a brewery will prefer the lower temperature cold liquor as refrigeration costs can be quite high. To achieve this cold liquor tanks are usually placed in cold areas of the plant away from heat generating equipment. Cold liquor tanks are typically single skinned vessels with no insulation in areas where the ambient temperature is sufficient for the heat exchange. In regions with high ambient temperature ranges it might be required to actively cool the cold liquor tank to ensure the heat exchange process for the wort is adequate though this can sacrifice achieving good hot wort temperatures. In such instances the cold liquor tanks are usually double skinned insulated vessels.

== Features of cold liquor tanks ==
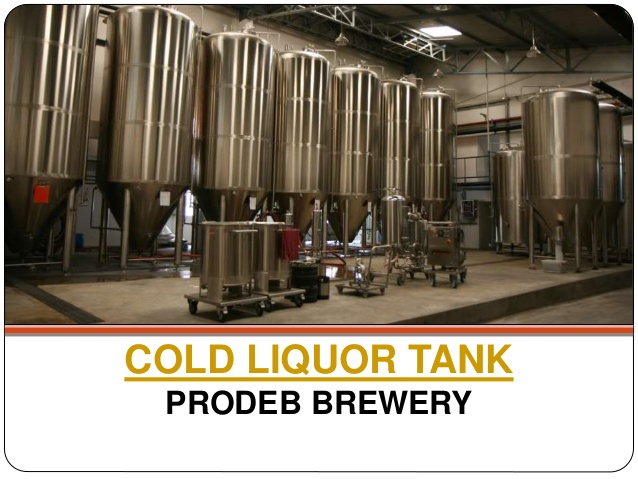
Cold liquor tank to brewing process

Cold liquor tanks can have different designs based on either circumstance or intentional design. Many facilities will make do with the pre-existing equipment on site so reuse of disused vessels during periods of plant upgrade is common which leads to designs of circumstance.

=== Access ===
Countries usually have access requirements for tanks of a certain size and so accessways are often a feature of cold liquor tanks and other buffer tanks in industrial facilities. Accessways of this type are often called manways. These accessways are usually round to limit stresses on the finished construction of the vessel though rectangular accessways are used at times.

=== Connections ===
The diameters of the inlet and outlet connections will depend on the demand of the water usage and the outlet periodicity. Instrumentation connections will depend on the type of instrument though manufacturers have typical sizes common to the region of sale. Typical ports include:

- Water Inlet Port (from water production plant or site buffer tank)
- Outlet port (to process)
- Level gauges
- Level sensor
- Water Return Port (less commonly needed)
- Temperature Port (less commonly needed)
- UV sterilisation lamp (less commonly needed)
- Water Re-Circulation connections (less commonly needed)

=== Construction finishes ===
Internal welds should be ground and polished to a food grade surface finish. The regulations for this will vary by country but are generally to similar requirements. Internal surfaces also have a similar requirement though there is less polishing requirement because sheet steels from a mill will often be supplied at the grade required for food contact in the given country. The external finish is often not a concern as it is not a food safety issue though manufacturers often take pride in providing tanks that look good as an effort to boost their customers perception of the installed product.

=== Level control ===
Often this is achieved by a float valve that intakes water to a set point rather than dictating the exact level of the tank.

=== Level sensing ===
This is used if there is integration of water demand information feedback to the water production plant. Often the control aspects of the water production are conducted in a larger plant scale buffer tank which is used to indicate the overall production demand and as a primary site buffer.

=== Valving ===
These tanks are usually operated automatically meaning the outlets and inlets are controlled with electrical control systems via auto valves on the outlets and inlets where applicable.

=== Tank volume ===
Tank volumes are designed to hold enough water such that there is enough coolant available for the wort cooling demand. Occasionally a tank will be designed to hold enough water for a secondary purpose such as pump seal flushing etc. though this is not best practice. Often extra volume is added to the tanks as a safety factor and in case there are future site throughput upgrades which require more buffer volume within the cold liquor tanks.

=== Tank material ===
The tanks are constructed from materials suitable for human food contact. If the tanks are managed for sources of possible contamination then the tanks are not cleaned often. This means that often the tanks will be made from sterile materials such as stainless steel (SS304 is typically sufficient). Tanks can also be made from hard polymers such as high density poly ethylene (HDPE) but these materials have less longevity for a not too dissimilar cost. Old reused tanks can have polymer bladders placed inside them to make a leaking tank usable again. This is an example of a cost cutting measure a facility might make during a plant upgrade project or to prevent the need for extensive works when a tank is leaking.

== See also ==
- Glycol Chillers
- Brewing
