= Marmite =

Savoury spread

- Formerly: Marmite Food Company
- Type: Private (1902–1990); Subsidiary (1990–2000)
- Industry: Food
- Founded: 1902; 124 years ago
- Defunct: 2000 (as a manufacturing company)
- Fate: Acquired by CPC International (then renamed "Best Foods") in 1990, became a brand of Unilever in 2000
- Headquarters: Burton upon Trent, England
- Products: Food spread
- Owner: Unilever (2000–present)
- Parent: Best Foods Inc. (1990–2000)
- Website: marmite.co.uk

Marmite (/ˈmɑːrmaɪt/) is a British savoury spread based on yeast extract invented by the Marmite Food Company in 1902. It is made from by-products of beer brewing (trub). Marmite is a vegan source of B vitamins, including supplementary vitamin B_{12}. It is traditionally eaten spread on buttered toast. Since 2000, the company is owned by Unilever.

Marmite is a sticky dark-brown paste with a distinctive, salty, powerful flavour and heady aroma. This distinctive taste is represented in the marketing slogan: "Love it or hate it." Such is its prominence in British culture that Marmite is often used as a metaphor for something that is an acquired taste or polarises opinion. Marmite is commonly used as a flavouring, as it is known for its savoury taste due to its high levels of glutamate (1960mg/100g).

The image on the jar shows a marmite (French: [maʁmit]), a French term for a large, covered earthenware or metal cooking pot. Marmite was originally supplied in earthenware pots but since the 1920s has been sold in glass jars. Marmite's distinctive bulbous jars are supplied by the German glass manufacturer Gerresheimer.

Similar products include the Australian Vegemite (whose name is derived from that of Marmite), the Swiss Cenovis, the Brazilian Cenovit, the long-extinct Argentine Condibé, the French Viandox, and the German Vitam-R. Marmite in New Zealand has been manufactured since 1919 under licence, but with a different recipe; it is the only one sold as Marmite in Australasia and the Pacific Islands, whereas elsewhere the British version predominates.

== History ==
The first yeast extract spread was invented during the late 19th century when the German scientist Justus von Liebig discovered that brewer's yeast could be concentrated, bottled and eaten. Initial attempts to manufacture this yeast extract for commercial purposes had little success. This was until 1902, when the Marmite Food Extract Company was formed in Burton upon Trent, Staffordshire, England with Marmite as its main product and Burton as the site of the first factory. The by-product yeast needed for the paste was supplied by Bass Brewery. The initial producers of Marmite found that the yeast produced from British beer did not lend itself to the same treatment as continental yeast, which had different methods of fermentation. New machinery and manufacturing processes were implemented before a satisfactory yeast extract product was ready to market.

By 1907, the product had become successful enough to warrant construction of a second factory at Camberwell Green in London. By 1912, the discovery of vitamins was a boost for Marmite, as the spread is a rich source of the vitamin B complex; with the vitamin B_{1} deficiency beriberi being common during World War I, the spread became more popular. British troops during World War I were issued Marmite as part of their rations.

During the 1930s, Marmite was used by the English haematologist and physician researcher Lucy Wills to successfully treat a form of anaemia in mill workers in Bombay (present-day Mumbai), British India. She later identified folic acid as the active ingredient. Marmite was used to treat malnutrition by Suriya-Mal workers during the 1934–35 malaria epidemic in British Ceylon (present-day Sri Lanka). Housewives were encouraged to spread Marmite thinly and to "use it sparingly just now" because of limited rations of the product.

In 1990, Marmite Limited, which had become a subsidiary of Bovril Limited, was bought by CPC International Inc, which changed its name to Best Foods Inc in 1998. Best Foods Inc subsequently merged with Unilever in 2000, and Marmite is now a trademark owned by Unilever.

== Similar products ==
There are a number of similar yeast products available in other countries; these products are not directly connected to the original Marmite recipe and brand. The Australian product Vegemite was developed in early 1920s by the chemist and food technologist Cyril Callister for Fred Walker & Co. due to shortages of Marmite exports to Australia as a result of the First World War. It is now distributed in many countries. AussieMite is another marmite-like product sold in Australia. Other products include OzeMite, which is made by Dick Smith Foods; Cenovit, a Brazilian spread; Vitam-R, a German spread; Cenovis, a Swiss spread (sold internationally under the brand Sonaris); and Vegex, an autolyzed yeast product available in the United States since 1913. In the United Kingdom, own-branded yeast extract, very similar to Marmite, is sold by Sainsbury's, Asda, Tesco and Aldi.

== Usage ==
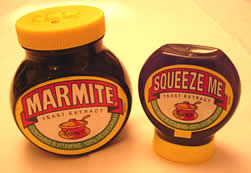
The "squeeze me" version of Marmite

Marmite has traditionally been eaten as a savoury spread on bread, toast, savoury biscuits or crackers, and other similar baked products. Owing to its concentrated taste, it is often spread very thinly in combination with butter or margarine. It can be made into a savoury hot drink by adding one teaspoon to a mug of hot water, much like Oxo or Bovril. It is also commonly used to enrich casseroles and stews.

Marmite is often paired with cheese—for example, in a cheese sandwich or a cheese-flavoured biscuit such as Mini Cheddars. In the UK, Starbucks offers cheese and Marmite panini. There are Marmite-flavoured varieties of Walkers Crisps, and of some brands of rice cakes and biscuits.

Marmite has also been used as an ingredient in cocktails, including the Marmite Cocktail and the Marmite Gold Rush.

Celebrity chefs have created signature Marmite-flavoured recipes: Nigella Lawson has one for Marmite spaghetti, and Heston Blumenthal has one for Marmite consommé.

In 2020, Marmite launched a campaign on Instagram—"The Great Marmite Experiment"—encouraging people to share their Marmite-flavoured recipes. The many entries in response included roast potatoes, beef Wellington and cookies.

In Malaysia, Singapore and Hong Kong, Marmite is enjoyed stirred into congee (savoury rice porridge), and in an intensely savoury Malaysian dish (local Chinese dish) called Marmite chicken, consisting of fried pieces of chicken tossed in a Marmite sauce.

== Manufacture ==
While the process is secret, the general method for making yeast extract on a commercial scale is to add salt to a suspension of yeast, making the solution hypertonic, which results in the cells shrivelling; this triggers autolysis, during which the yeast self-destructs. The dying yeast cells are then heated to complete their breakdown, and since yeast cells have thick cell walls which would detract from the smoothness of the end product, the husks are sieved out. As with other yeast extracts, Marmite contains free glutamic acid, the monosodium salt of which being monosodium glutamate.

Currently, the main ingredients of Marmite are glutamic acid-rich yeast extract, with lesser quantities of salt, vegetable extract, spice extracts and celery extracts, although the precise composition is a trade secret. Vitamins added for food fortification include riboflavin, folic acid, and vitamin B_{12}. Vitamin B_{12} is not naturally found in yeast extract, but is very important for vegans who are at risk of deficiency.

== Nutritional information ==
Nutrient quantities of Marmite Reduced Salt
Nutrient	per 100 g	per 8 g serving	% RDA
_{% RDA = % of Recommended Daily Allowance}^{provided by 8 g suggested serving)}
Energy	1153 kJ	92 kJ	
Calories	271 kcal	22 kcal	
Protein	39 g	3.1 g	
Carbohydrates	29 g	2.3 g	
of which sugars	0.6 g	<0.5 g	
Fat	<0.5 g	<0.5 g	
of which saturates	<0.1 g	<0.1 g	
Fibre	3.1 g	0.1 g	
Salt	6.1 g	0.49 g	
Thiamine (B_{1})	13.6 mg	1.09 mg	99%
Riboflavin (B_{2})	8.5 mg	0.68 mg	49%
Niacin (B_{3})	86 mg	6.9 mg	43%
Folic Acid (B_{9})	1500 μg	120 μg	60%
Vitamin B_{12}	25 μg	2 μg	80%

Marmite is rich in B vitamins including thiamine (B_{1}), riboflavin (B_{2}), niacin (B_{3}), and folic acid (B_{9}). Vitamin B_{12} is only available through artificial enrichment; riboflavin and folic acid are added on top of the naturally occurring amount. The sodium content of the spread is high and has caused concern, although it is the amount per serving rather than the percentage in bulk Marmite that is relevant. (Sodium amount is noted as table salt-equivalent in UK nutritional labels. 6.1 g of salt corresponds to 2.4 g of sodium.) The main ingredient of Marmite is yeast extract, which contains a high concentration of glutamic acid.

Marmite is not gluten-free, as it is made from yeast grown in a wheat-based liquid (wort). Although it is thoroughly washed, it may contain small quantities of gluten. Marmite contains around 30 part per million gluten according to third-party testing, meeting the EU "very low gluten" limit but not the "gluten free" definition. Unilever reports that no cases of gluten-related reactions have been reported for Marmite. Nevertheless, Unilever has chosen not to offer a guarantee on the gluten content of Marmite.

Marmite is contraindicated if a person takes a monoamine oxidase inhibitor antidepressant, such as phenelzine (Nardil) or tranylcypromine (Parnate), as yeast extracts interact adversely with these types of medications due to their tyramine content.

== Storage ==
Marmite should be stored in the dark and kept cool, but should not be refrigerated.

== Marketing ==
"I remember sitting in my office looking at the brief and saying to Richard [Flintham], 'I fucking hate Marmite.' And he said 'Oh, I love it.' And we both just looked at each other."

— Andy McLeod of marketing agency BMP DDB on the creation of the "Love it or Hate it" campaign

Marmite's publicity campaigns initially emphasised the spread's healthy nature, extolling it as "The growing up spread you never grow out of". The first major Marmite advertising campaign began during the 1930s, with characters whose faces incorporated the word "good". Soon afterwards, the increasing awareness of vitamins was used in Marmite advertising, with slogans proclaiming that "A small quantity added to the daily diet will ensure you and your family are taking sufficient vitamin B to keep nerves, brain, and digestion in proper working order".

During the 1980s, the spread was advertised with the slogan "My mate, Marmite", chanted in television commercials by an army platoon. The spread had been a standard vitamin supplement for British-based German POWs during the Second World War. For many years television advertisements for Marmite featured the 1975 song "Low Rider" by the American funk band War with the lyrics changed to the phrase "My Mate, Marmite".

=== Love/hate polarisation ===
By the 1990s Marmite's distinctive and powerful flavour had earned it as many detractors as it had fans, and it was known for producing a polarised "love/hate" reaction amongst consumers. Marmite began a "Love it or Hate it" campaign in October 1996, and this resulted in the inventing of the phrase "Marmite effect" or "Marmite reaction" for anything which provoked controversy. On 22 April 2010, Unilever threatened legal action against the British National Party (BNP) for using a jar of Marmite and the "love it or hate it" slogan in a party political broadcast.

== Availability worldwide ==
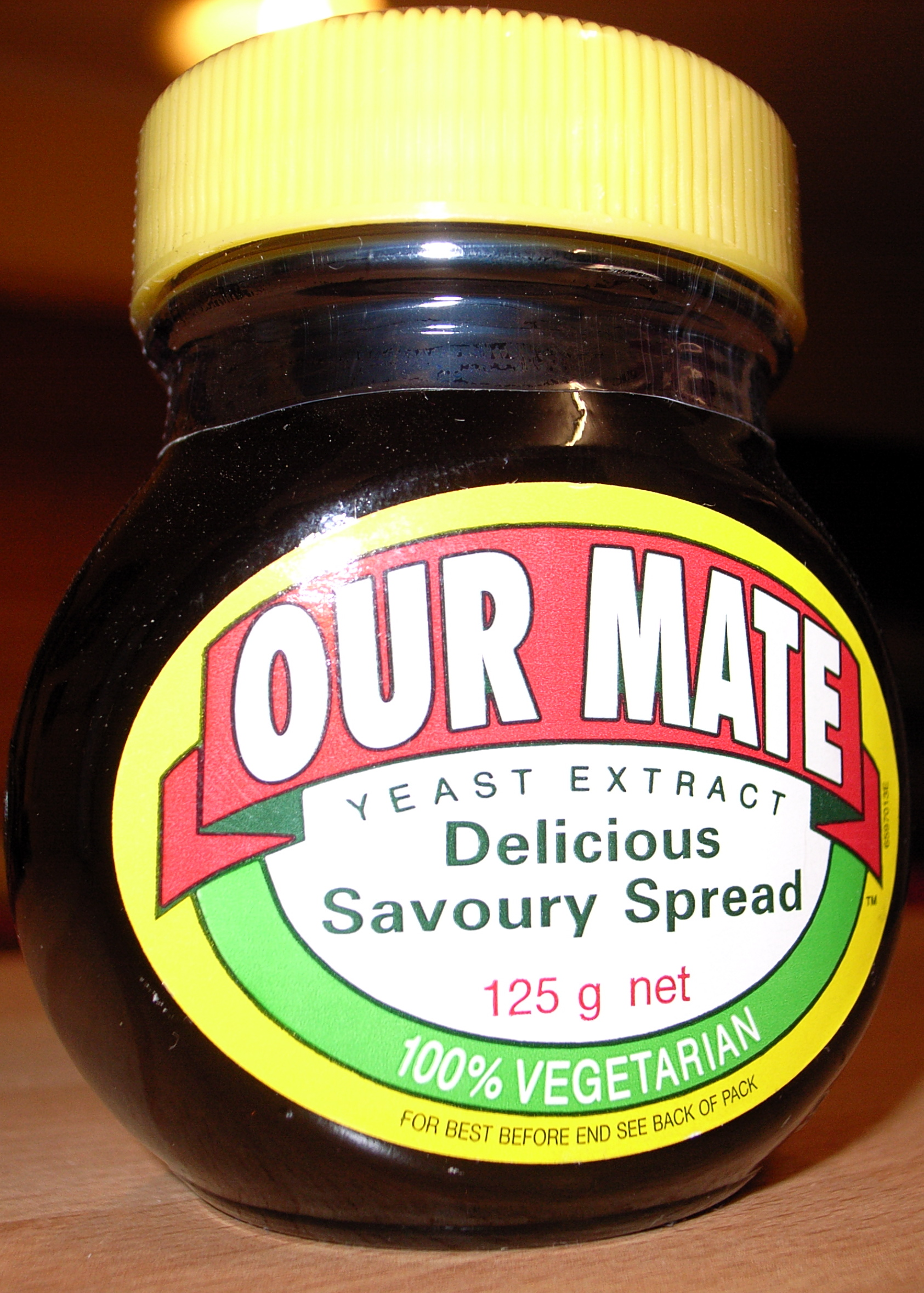
Our Mate – Marmite branded for sale in Australia and New Zealand

Because of the local product named Marmite, European Marmite is sold by the name "Our Mate" in Australia and New Zealand. New Zealand Marmite uses the name "NZ-Mite" elsewhere.

=== Denmark ===
In Denmark, food safety legislation dictates that foodstuffs that contain added vitamins can only be sold by retailers which have been licensed by the Veterinary and Food Administration. In May 2011, the company that imports the product to Denmark revealed that it was not licensed and had therefore stopped selling the product: this resulted in widespread but inaccurate reports by the British media that Marmite had been banned by the Danish authorities. The Danish Veterinary and Food Administration stated in 2015 that Marmite had not been banned in the country, but that fortified foods need to be tested for safety and approved before they can be marketed in the country. The issue was resolved in 2016, after the completion of a 2014 supplier-requested test.

=== Canada ===
On 24 January 2014, the Canadian Food Inspection Agency was noted, in a Canadian Broadcasting Corporation story, as preparing to stop the sale of Marmite, as well as Vegemite and Ovaltine, in Canada because they were enriched with vitamins and minerals which were not listed by Canadian food regulations. The agency said the products were not a health hazard. The CFIA later specified that these specific items had been seized because they were not the versions that are formulated for sale in Canada and which satisfy all Canadian food regulations. Canadian versions of Marmite and the other products would still be permitted to be sold in Canada.

In April 2025, after vegemite was once more taken off the shelves of an Australian owned cafe in Toronto by the CFIA, Australian PM Anthony Albanese expressed his support of vegemite over marmite and stated that he found it "rather odd" that Canada permitted vegemite's "rubbish" rival product Marmite.

=== South Africa ===
Marmite is manufactured by licence in South Africa by Pioneer Foods in its traditional form.

South Africa also produces a bottled, long-life Marmite-flavoured cheese spread. It is light in texture and contains a hint of Marmite.

== Special editions ==
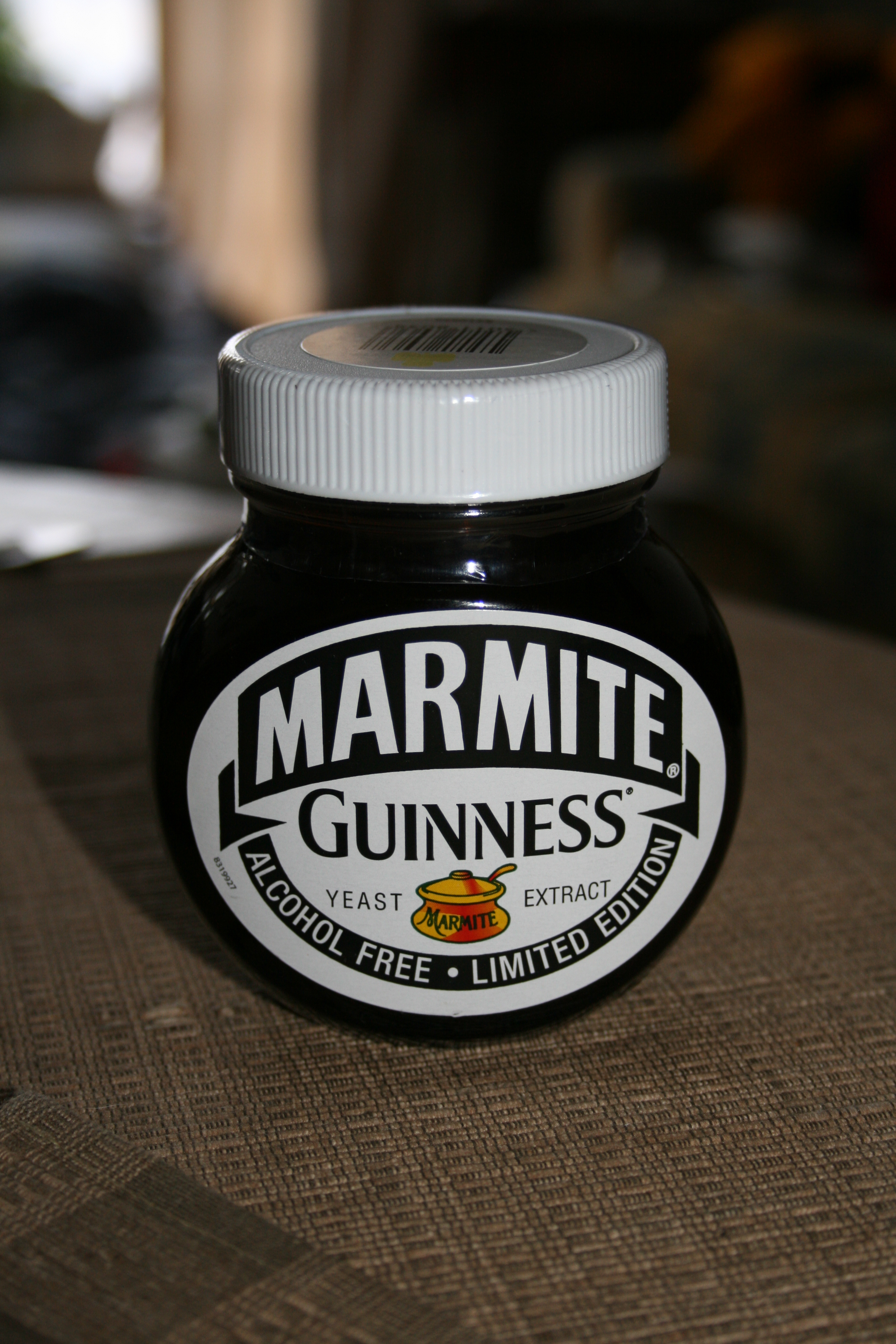
Limited edition Guinness Marmite

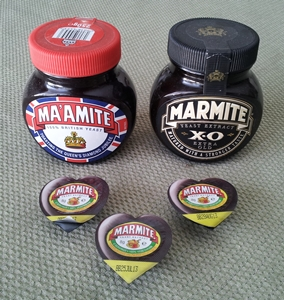
Three types of special Marmite packaging available during 2012

In 2002 a 100th anniversary jar was released.

In February 2007, Marmite produced a limited edition Guinness Marmite of 300,000 jars of 250-gram (8.8 oz) of their yeast extract with 30% Guinness yeast, giving it a noticeable hint of "Guinness" flavour. In January 2008 Champagne Marmite was released for Valentine's Day, with a limited-edition production of 600,000 units initially released exclusively to Selfridges of London. The product had 0.3% champagne added to the recipe, and a modified heart-shaped label with "I love you" in place of the logo.

In 2009 a limited edition Marston's Pedigree Marmite was initiated to celebrate the 2009 Ashes Cricket test series.

In March 2010, a "super-strength" version of Marmite was released, called Marmite XO (XO standing for "extra old"). Marmite XO is matured for 28 days, four times longer than usual. The original Marmite XO's cap was black, and has a black and gold label. In July 2019, Marmite XO returned due to popular demand. The 2019 version has an off-white cap as opposed to the original black.

In April 2012, a special-edition jar in commemoration of the Diamond Jubilee of Queen Elizabeth II was released. With the product renamed "Ma'amite", the redesigned label featured a colour scheme based upon the Union Jack; the marmite and spoon logo replaced by a gold crown, and with a red rather than yellow cap. The front label also declares "Made with 100% British Yeast". Coinciding with the 110th anniversary of the brand, production was limited to 300,000 jars. For Christmas 2012 a gold limited edition was begun, containing edible gold-coloured flecks.

Marmite chocolate is also available.

In 2015 Marmite Summer of Love Special Edition featured a flower power-themed label. This special edition's blend had a lighter taste made using 100% lager yeast.

On 25 March 2019, Marmite peanut butter was introduced.

On 2 May 2022, Marmite Truffle was launched and sold exclusively in Sainsbury's, along with Marmite 'Dynamite', a chilli-flavoured Marmite spread. The Marmite Truffle was marketed with a variation of the 'Love it or Hate it' slogan designed to make it sound more sophisticated: "One either loves it or considers it utterly vulgar".

From 2023 to 2025, Marmite partnered with the Elton John AIDS Foundation, donating $1 million regardless of sales and releasing four themed labels commemorating John's song Rocket Man, the 50th anniversary of the album Goodbye Yellow Brick Road, the 1975 Dodger Stadium performance, and the 1983 single I'm Still Standing.

== See also ==
- Shelf-stable food
- Guinness Yeast Extract
- List of spreads
- Lees (fermentation)
- Nutritional yeast
- Promite
- Twiglets
- Miso
