= Tea leaf paradox =

Fluid dynamics phenomenon

The tea leaves collect in the middle and the bottom, instead of along the rim.

The blue line is the secondary flow that pushes the tea leaves to the middle of the bottom.

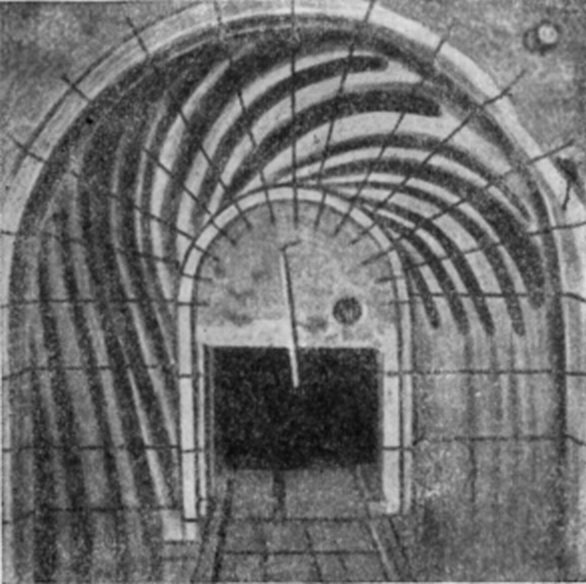
Visualization of secondary flow in river bend model (A. Ya. Milovich, 1913, flow from right to left). Near-bottom streamlines are marked with dye injected by a pipette.

In fluid dynamics, the tea leaf paradox is a phenomenon where tea leaves in a cup of tea migrate to the center and bottom of the cup after being stirred rather than being forced to the edges of the cup, as would be expected in a spiral centrifuge.

The correct physical explanation of the paradox was for the first time given by James Thomson in 1857. He correctly connected the appearance of secondary flow (both Earth atmosphere and tea cup) with "friction on the bottom". The formation of secondary flows in an annular channel was theoretically treated by Joseph Valentin Boussinesq as early as in 1868. The migration of near-bottom particles in river-bend flows was experimentally investigated by A. Ya. Milovich in 1913. The solution first came from Albert Einstein in a 1926 paper in which he explained the erosion of river banks.

== Explanation ==
The stirring makes the water spin in the cup, causing a centrifugal force outwards. Near the bottom however, the water is slowed by friction. Thus the centrifugal force is weaker near the bottom than higher up, leading to a secondary circular (helical) flow that goes outwards at the top, down along the outer edge, inwards along the bottom, bringing the leaves to the center, and then up again.

== Applications ==
The phenomenon has been used to develop a technique to separate red blood cells from blood plasma, to understand atmospheric pressure systems, and in the process of brewing beer to separate out coagulated trub in the whirlpool.

== See also ==
- Baer–Babinet law, also known as Baer's law – Theory on the formation of rivers due to Earth's rotation
- Ekman layer – Net transport of surface water perpendicular to wind direction
- Secondary flow – Relatively minor flow superimposed on the primary flow by inviscid assumptions
- Meander – One of a series of curves in a channel of a matured stream
