= Brewing =

Process in beer production

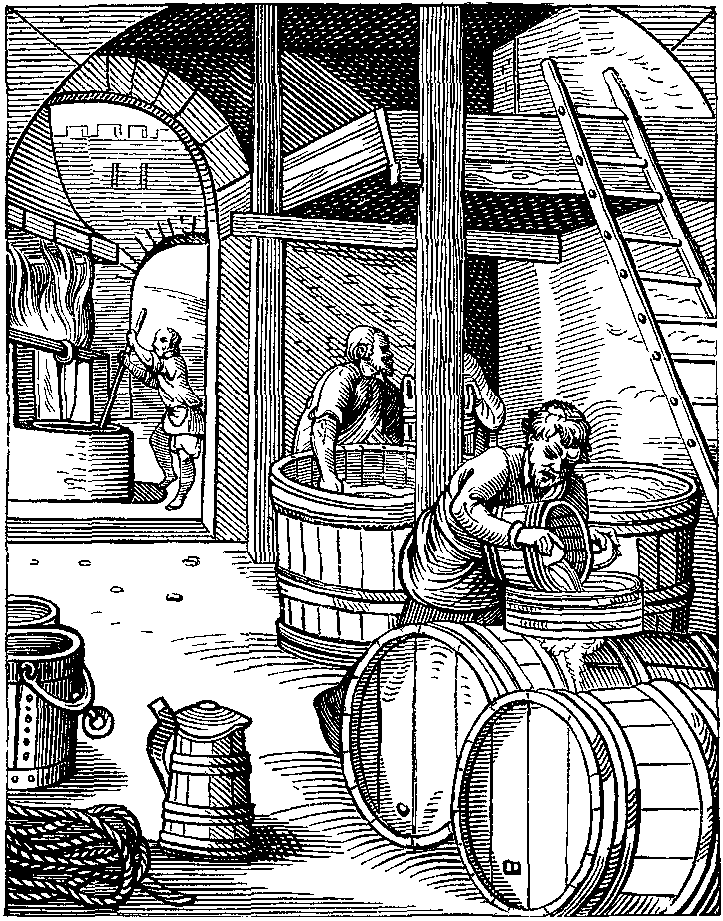
A 16th-century brewery

Brewing is the production of beer by steeping a starch source (commonly cereal grains, the most popular of which is barley) in water and fermenting the resulting sweet liquid with yeast. It may be done in a brewery by a commercial brewer, at home by a homebrewer, or communally. Brewing has taken place since at least the 11th millennium BC, and archaeological evidence suggests that prehistoric peoples and later civilisations, including those in ancient Egypt, China, and Mesopotamia, brewed beer. Since the nineteenth century the brewing industry has been part of most western economies.

The basic ingredients of beer are water and a fermentable starch source such as malted barley. Most beer is fermented with a brewer's yeast and flavoured with hops. Less widely used starch sources include millet, sorghum and cassava. Secondary sources (adjuncts), such as maize (corn), rice, or sugar, may also be used, sometimes to reduce cost, or to add a feature, such as adding wheat to aid in retaining the foamy head of the beer. The most common starch source is ground cereal or "grist" – the proportion of the starch or cereal ingredients in a beer recipe may be called grist, grain bill, or simply mash ingredients.

Steps in the brewing process include malting, milling, mashing, lautering, boiling, fermenting, conditioning, filtering, and packaging. There are three main fermentation methods: warm, cool and spontaneous. Fermentation may take place in an open or closed fermenting vessel; a secondary fermentation may also occur in the cask or bottle. There are several additional brewing methods, such as Burtonisation, double dropping, and Yorkshire Square, as well as post-fermentation treatment such as filtering, and barrel-ageing.

== History ==
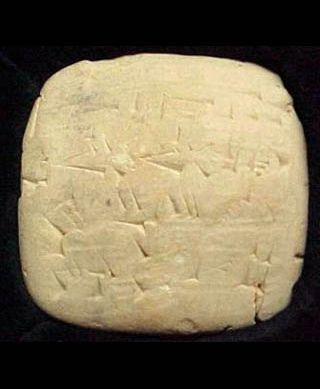
The Alulu beer receipt records a purchase of "best" beer from a brewer, c. 2050 BC, from the Sumerian city of Umma in Mesopotamia (ancient Iraq).

Brewing has taken place since at least the 11th millennium BC, and archaeological evidence suggests that prehistoric peoples and later civilisations, including those in China, ancient Egypt, and Mesopotamia brewed beer. Descriptions of beer production can be found in cuneiform (the oldest known writing) from ancient Mesopotamia. In Mesopotamia the brewer's craft derived social sanction and divine protection from female deities/goddesses, specifically: Ninkasi, who covered the production of beer, Siris, who was used in a metonymic way to refer to beer, and Siduri, who appears in the Epic of Gilgamesh as a divine alewife or tavern-keeper, covered the enjoyment of beer. In pre-industrial times, and in developing countries, women are frequently the main brewers.

As almost any cereal containing certain sugars can undergo spontaneous fermentation due to wild yeasts in the air and on the grains, it is possible that beer-like beverages were independently developed throughout the world in prehistoric times. The earliest archaeological evidence for cereal-based beer brewing has been found at Raqefet Cave in present-day Israel, where analysis of stone mortars indicates that the Natufians, a semi-sedentary foraging people, brewed wheat- or barley-based beer around 13,000 years ago, probably for ritual feasts. The brewing of beer at Raqefet Cave predates the appearance of domesticated cereals in the Near East by several millennia.

In Mesopotamia, early pictorial evidence for beer drinking includes a 6,000-year-old Sumerian seal from Tepe Gawra, dating to around 4000 BC, which depicts two figures drinking beer through long reed straws from a communal bowl. Chemical analysis of pottery from Godin Tepe in the central Zagros Mountains of present-day Iran provides evidence of barley beer from about 5,500 years ago, with fragments of a jug found to contain deposits of beerstone, a by-product associated with brewing. A 3900-year-old Sumerian poem honouring Ninkasi, the patron goddess of brewing, contains the oldest surviving beer recipe, describing the production of beer from barley via bread. The production of bread and beer has been argued to be responsible for humanity's ability to develop technology and build civilisation.

Beer may have been known in Neolithic Europe as far back as 5,000 years ago, Brewing remained largely a household activity in early medieval Europe, although beer was also produced commercially and in monasteries. Ale produced before the Industrial Revolution continued to be made and sold on a domestic scale, while during the early Middle Ages beer was also being produced and sold by European monasteries. During the Industrial Revolution, the production of beer moved from artisanal to industrial manufacture, and domestic manufacture ceased to be significant by the end of the 19th century. The development of hydrometers and thermometers changed brewing by allowing the brewer more control of the process, and greater knowledge of the results. Today, the brewing industry is a global business, consisting of several dominant multinational companies, along with many thousands of smaller producers ranging from brewpubs to regional breweries.

== Ingredients ==
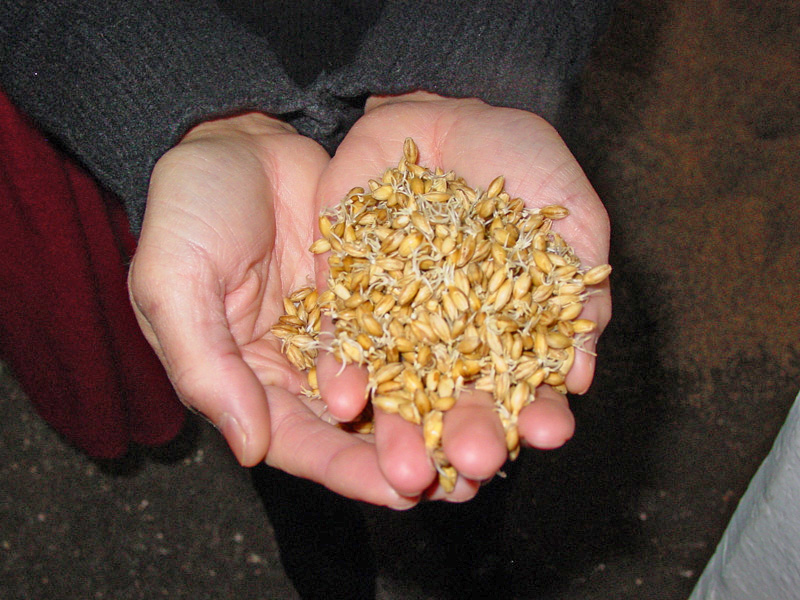
Malted barley before kilning or roasting

The basic ingredients of beer are water; a starch source, such as malted barley, able to be fermented (converted into alcohol); a brewer's yeast to produce the fermentation; and a flavouring, such as hops, to offset the sweetness of the malt. A mixture of starch sources may be used, with a secondary saccharide, such as maize (corn), rice, or sugar, these often being termed adjuncts, especially when used as a lower-cost substitute for malted barley. Less widely used starch sources include millet, sorghum, and cassava root in Africa, potato in Brazil, and agave in Mexico, among others. The most common starch source is ground cereal or "grist" – the proportion of the starch or cereal ingredients in a beer recipe may be called grist, grain bill, or simply mash ingredients.

Water

Beer is composed mostly of water. Regions have water with different mineral components; as a result, different regions were originally better suited to making certain types of beer, thus giving them a regional character. For example, Dublin has hard water well suited to making stout, such as Guinness; while Pilsen has soft water well suited to making pale lager, such as Pilsner Urquell. The waters of Burton in England contain gypsum, which benefits making pale ale to such a degree that brewers of pale ales will add gypsum to the local water in a process known as Burtonisation.

Starch source

The starch source in a beer provides the fermentable material and is a key determinant of the strength and flavour of the beer. The most common starch source used in beer is malted grain. Grain is malted by soaking it in water, allowing it to begin germination, and then drying the partially germinated grain in a kiln. Malting grain produces enzymes that will allow conversion from starches in the grain into fermentable sugars during the mash process. Different roasting times and temperatures are used to produce different colours of malt from the same grain. Darker malts will produce darker beers.

Nearly all beer includes barley malt as the majority of the starch. Barley malt, in addition to being a starch source, is used because its fibrous husk aids filtration during brewing, and because it is a rich source of amylase enzymes that facilitate the conversion of starch into sugars. Other malted and unmalted grains (including wheat, rice, oats, and rye, and, less frequently, maize (corn) and sorghum) may be used. Sorghum may be used as a starch source in gluten-free beer.

Hops

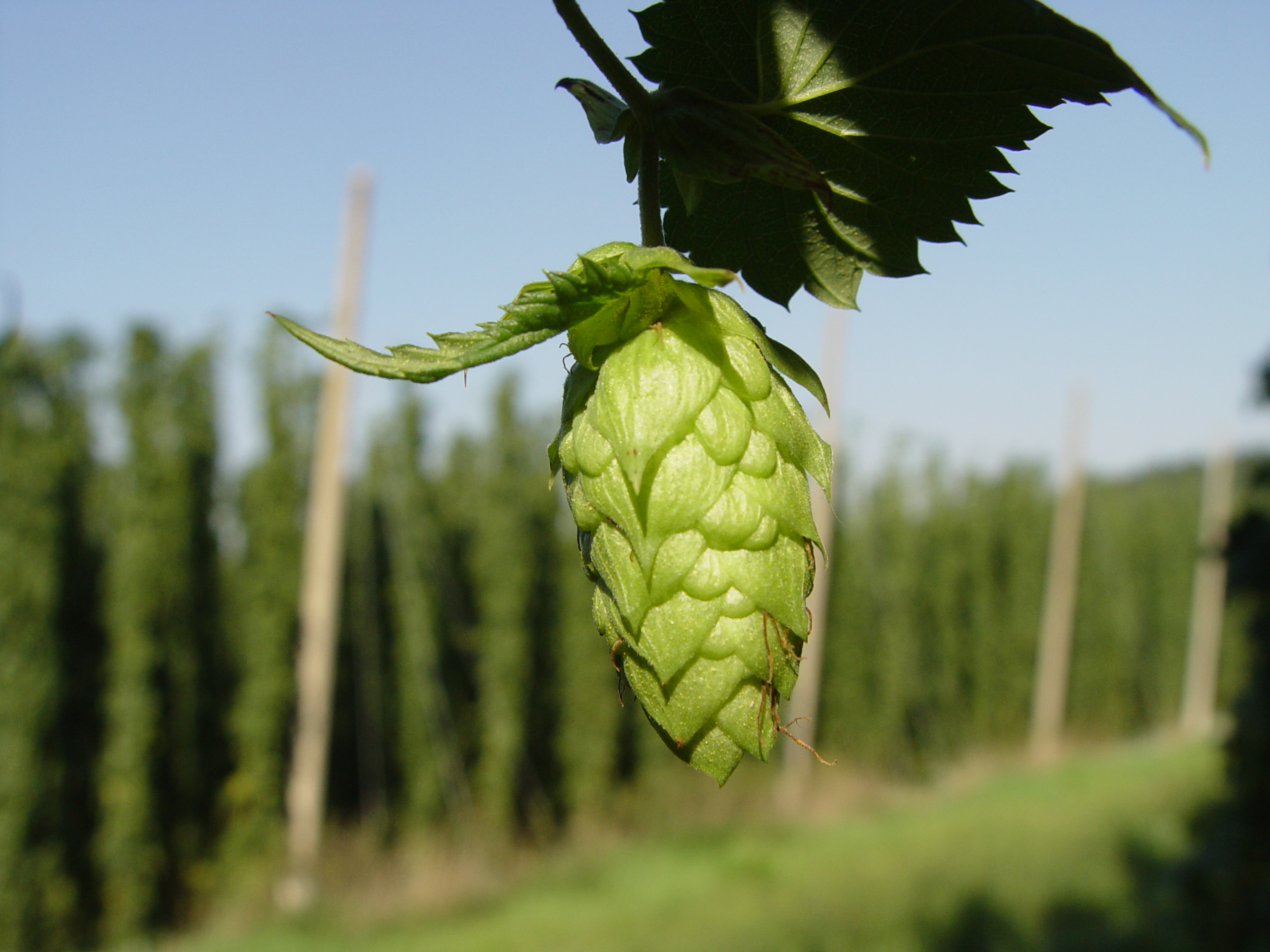
Hop cone grown in a hop field, Hallertau, Germany

Hops are the female flower clusters or seed cones of the hop vine Humulus lupulus, which are used as a flavouring and preservative agent in nearly all beer made today. Hops had been used for medicinal and food flavouring purposes since Roman times; by the 7th century in Carolingian monasteries in what is now Germany, beer was being made with hops, though it isn't until the thirteenth century that widespread cultivation of hops for use in beer is recorded. Before the thirteenth century, beer was flavoured with plants such as yarrow, wild rosemary, and bog myrtle, and other ingredients such as juniper berries, aniseed and ginger, which would be combined into a mixture known as gruit and used as hops are now used; between the thirteenth and the sixteenth century, during which hops took over as the dominant flavouring, beer flavoured with gruit was known as ale, while beer flavoured with hops was known as beer. Some beers today, such as Fraoch by the Scottish Williams Bros Brewing Company and Cervoise Lancelot by the French Brasserie Lancelot, use plants other than hops for flavouring.

Hops contain several characteristics that brewers desire in beer: they contribute a bitterness that balances the sweetness of the malt; they provide floral, citrus, and herbal aromas and flavours; they have an antibiotic effect that favours the activity of brewer's yeast over less desirable microorganisms; and they aid in "head retention", the length of time that the foam on top of the beer (the beer head) will last. The preservative in hops comes from the lupulin glands which contain soft resins with alpha and beta acids. Though much studied, the preservative nature of the soft resins is not yet fully understood, though it has been observed that unless stored at a cool temperature, the preservative nature will decrease. Brewing is the sole major commercial use of hops.

Yeast

Yeast is the microorganism that is responsible for fermentation in beer. Yeast metabolises the sugars extracted from grains, which produces alcohol and carbon dioxide, and thereby turns wort into beer. In addition to fermenting the beer, yeast influences the character and flavour. The dominant types of yeast used to make beer are Saccharomyces cerevisiae, known as ale yeast, and Saccharomyces pastorianus, known as lager yeast; Brettanomyces ferments lambics, and Torulaspora delbrueckii ferments Bavarian weissbier. Before the role of yeast in fermentation was understood, fermentation involved wild or airborne yeasts, and a few styles such as lambics still use this method today. Emil Christian Hansen, a Danish biochemist employed by the Carlsberg Laboratory, developed pure yeast cultures which were introduced into the Carlsberg brewery in 1883, and pure yeast strains are now the main fermenting source used worldwide.

Clarifying agent

Some brewers add one or more clarifying agents to beer, which typically precipitate (collect as a solid) out of the beer along with protein solids and are found only in trace amounts in the finished product. This process makes the beer appear bright and clean, rather than the cloudy appearance of ethnic and older styles of beer such as wheat beers.

Examples of clarifying agents include isinglass, obtained from swim bladders of fish; Irish moss, a seaweed; kappa carrageenan, from the seaweed kappaphycus; polyclar (a commercial brand of clarifier); and gelatin. If a beer is marked "suitable for Vegans", it was generally clarified either with seaweed or with artificial agents, although the "Fast Cask" method invented by Marston's in 2009 may provide another method.

== Brewing process ==

There are several steps in the brewing process, which may include malting, mashing, lautering, boiling, fermenting, conditioning, filtering, and packaging. The brewing equipment needed to make beer has grown more sophisticated over time, and now covers most aspects of the brewing process.

Malting is the process where barley grain is made ready for brewing. Malting is broken down into three steps in order to help to release the starches in the barley. First, during steeping, the grain is added to a vat with water and allowed to soak for approximately 40 hours. During germination, the grain is spread out on the floor of the germination room for around 5 days. The final part of malting is kilning when the malt goes through a very high temperature drying in a kiln; with gradual temperature increase over several hours. When kilning is complete, the grains are now termed malt, and they will be milled or crushed to break apart the kernels and expose the endosperm, which contains the majority of the carbohydrates and sugars; this makes it easier to extract the sugars during mashing.

Mashing converts the starches released during the malting stage into sugars that can be fermented. The milled grain is mixed with hot water in a large vessel known as a mash tun. In this vessel, the grain and water are mixed together to create a cereal mash. During the mash, naturally occurring enzymes present in the malt convert the starches (long chain carbohydrates) in the grain into smaller molecules or simple sugars (mono-, di-, and tri-saccharides). This "conversion" is called saccharification which occurs between the temperatures 60–70 °C (140–158 °F). The result of the mashing process is a sugar-rich liquid or "wort", which is then strained through the bottom of the mash tun in a process known as lautering. Prior to lautering, the mash temperature may be raised to about 75–78 °C (167–172 °F) (known as a mashout) to free up more starch and reduce mash viscosity. Additional water may be sprinkled on the grains to extract additional sugars (a process known as sparging).

The wort is moved into a large tank known as a "copper" or kettle where it is boiled with hops and sometimes other ingredients such as herbs or sugars. This stage is where many chemical reactions take place, and where important decisions about the flavour, colour, and aroma of the beer are made. The boiling process serves to terminate enzymatic processes, precipitate proteins, isomerise hop resins, and concentrate and sterilise the wort. Hops add flavour, aroma and bitterness to the beer. At the end of the boil, the hopped wort settles to clarify in a vessel called a "whirlpool", where the more solid particles in the wort are separated out.

After the whirlpool, the wort is drawn away from the compacted hop trub, and rapidly cooled via a heat exchanger to a temperature where yeast can be added. A variety of heat exchanger designs are used in breweries, with the most common a plate-style. Water or glycol run in channels in the opposite direction of the wort, causing a rapid drop in temperature. It is very important to quickly cool the wort to a level where yeast can be added safely as yeast is unable to grow in very high temperatures, and will start to die in temperatures above 60 °C (140 °F). After the wort goes through the heat exchanger, the cooled wort goes into a fermentation tank. A type of yeast is selected and added, or "pitched", to the fermentation tank. When the yeast is added to the wort, the fermenting process begins, where the sugars turn into alcohol, carbon dioxide and other components. When the fermentation is complete the brewer may rack the beer into a new tank, called a conditioning tank. Conditioning of the beer is the process in which the beer ages, the flavour becomes smoother, and flavours that are unwanted dissipate. After conditioning for a week to several months, the beer may be filtered and force carbonated for bottling, or fined in the cask.

== Mashing ==
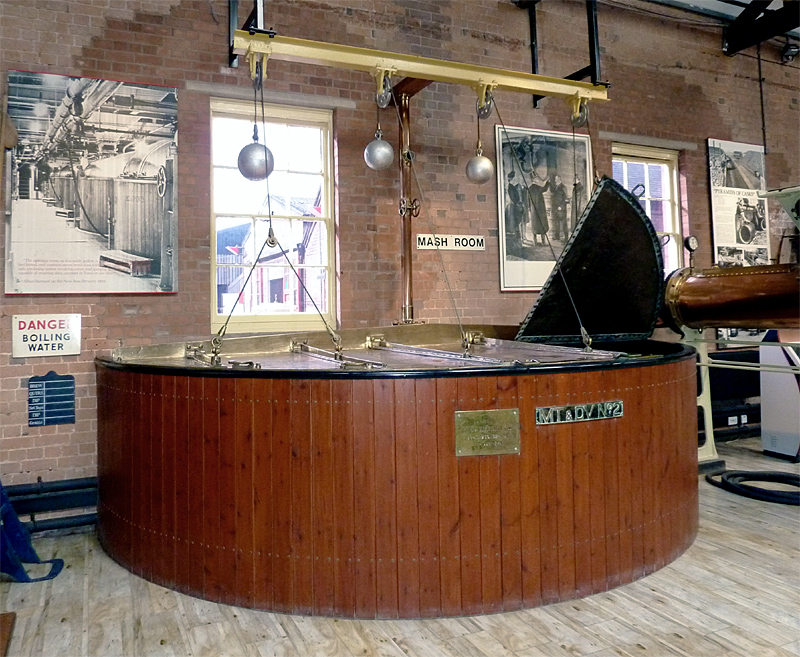
A mash tun at the Bass Museum in Burton-upon-Trent

Mashing is the process of combining a mix of milled grain (typically malted barley with supplementary grains such as corn, sorghum, rye or wheat), known as the "grist" or "grain bill", and water, known as "liquor", and heating this mixture in a vessel called a "mash tun". Mashing is a form of steeping, and defines the act of brewing, such as with making tea, sake, and soy sauce. Technically, wine and cider are not brewed but rather vinified, as there is no steeping process involving solids. Mead is also fermented directly without a steeping stage, and is conventionally described as being "made" rather than brewed. Mashing allows the enzymes in the malt to break down the starch in the grain into sugars, typically maltose, producing a malty, sugar-rich liquid called wort. There are two main methods – infusion mashing, in which the grains are heated in one vessel; and decoction mashing, in which a proportion of the grains are boiled and then returned to the mash, raising the temperature. Mashing may involve rests at certain temperatures - traditionally 45–62–73 °C or 113–144–163 °F, though modern, fully modified malt is often mashed with a single infusion held at around 65–68 °C (149–154 °F), where both major starch-converting enzymes are active without further steps. This takes place in a "mash tun" – an insulated brewing vessel with a false bottom.

Mashing usually takes 1 to 2 hours, and during this time enzymes in the malt break down components of the grain. The various temperature rests favour the activity of different enzymes, depending on the type and modification level of the malt and the brewer's intentions. Of particular importance are α-amylase and β-amylase, which hydrolyse starch to produce dextrins and fermentable sugars such as maltose. A traditional step mash may include a β-glucanase and protein rest around 45 °C (113 °F), a β-amylase rest around 62 °C (144 °F), and an α-amylase rest around 70 °C (158 °F). With modern well-modified malts, the lower-temperature rests are often omitted, and mashing may begin directly at temperatures where the amylases are more active. β-glucanases break down β-glucans in the mash, while proteolytic enzymes break down proteins into smaller peptides and amino acids. In modern brewing, commercial β-glucanase preparations may also be added to the mash. During saccharification, a mash rest of around 65–71 °C (149–160 °F) is commonly used. Lower temperatures within this range favour β-amylase activity and generally produce a more fermentable wort, while higher temperatures favour α-amylase activity and generally produce a less fermentable wort containing more dextrins. Mash temperature, duration and pH therefore influence the carbohydrate composition and fermentability of the resulting wort.

=== Lautering ===
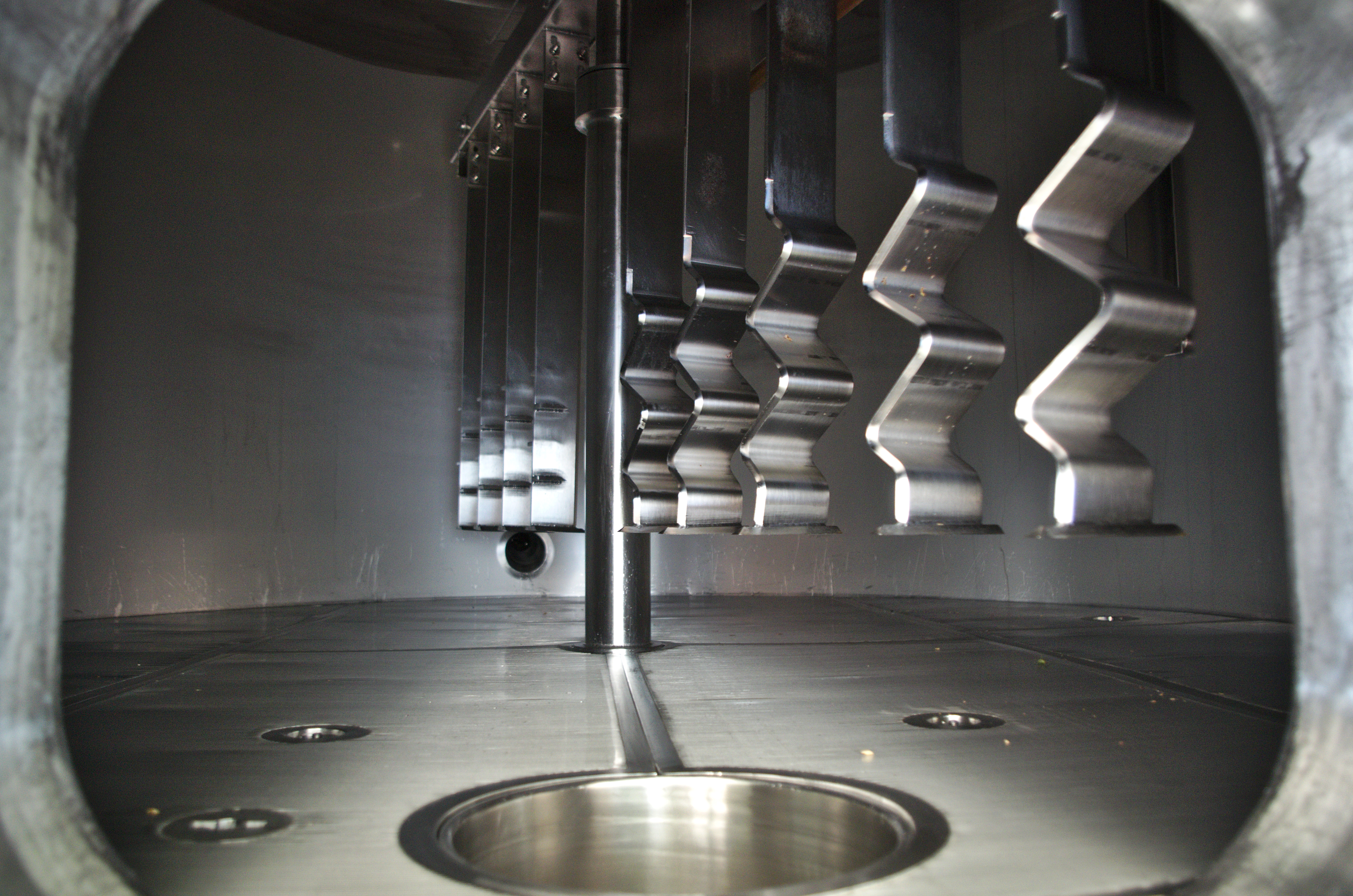
Lauter tun

Lautering is the separation of the wort (the liquid containing the sugar extracted during mashing) from the grains. This is done either in a mash tun outfitted with a false bottom, in a lauter tun, or in a mash filter. Most separation processes have two stages: first wort run-off, during which the extract is separated in an undiluted state from the spent grains, and sparging, in which extract which remains with the grains is rinsed off with hot water. The lauter tun is a tank with holes in the bottom small enough to hold back the large bits of grist and hulls (the ground or milled cereal). The bed of grist that settles on it is the actual filter. Some lauter tuns have provision for rotating rakes or knives to cut into the bed of grist to maintain good flow. The knives can be turned so they push the grain, a feature used to drive the spent grain out of the vessel. The mash filter is a plate-and-frame filter consisting of alternating membrane plates and chamber frames; the frames form chambers that receive the mash, and the plates support filter cloths through which the wort passes. The filter cloth, not the grain bed, acts as the filtration medium. The membranes are inflated with compressed air to squeeze additional wort from the grain between and after spargings.

== Boiling ==
After mashing, the beer wort is boiled with hops (and other flavourings if used) in a large tank known as a "copper" or brew kettle – though historically the mash vessel was used and is still in some small breweries. The boiling process is where chemical reactions take place, including sterilisation of the wort to remove unwanted bacteria, releasing of hop flavours, bitterness and aroma compounds through isomerisation, stopping of enzymatic processes, precipitation of proteins, and concentration of the wort. Finally, the vapours produced during the boil volatilise off-flavours, including dimethyl sulphide precursors. The boil is conducted so that it is even and intense – a continuous "rolling boil". The boil on average lasts between 45 and 90 minutes, depending on its intensity, the hop addition schedule, and volume of water the brewer expects to evaporate. At the end of the boil, solid particles in the hopped wort are separated out, usually in a vessel called a "whirlpool".

=== Brew kettle or copper ===
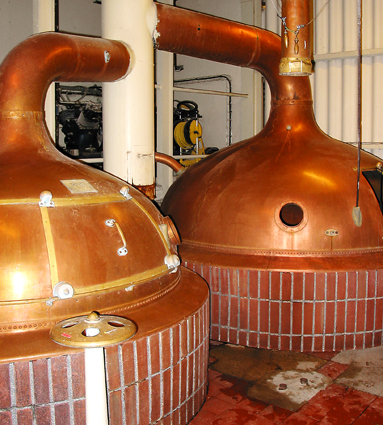
Brew kettles at Brasserie La Choulette in France

Copper is the traditional material for the boiling vessel for two main reasons: firstly because copper transfers heat quickly and evenly; secondly because the bubbles produced during boiling, which could act as an insulator against the heat, do not cling to the surface of copper, so the wort is heated in a consistent manner. The simplest boil kettles are direct-fired, with a burner underneath. These can produce a vigorous and favourable boil, but are also apt to scorch the wort where the flame touches the kettle, causing caramelisation and making cleanup difficult. Most breweries use a steam-fired kettle, which uses steam jackets in the kettle to boil the wort. Breweries usually have a boiling unit either inside or outside of the kettle, usually a tall, thin cylinder with vertical tubes, called a calandria, through which wort is pumped.

=== Whirlpool ===
At the end of the boil, solid particles in the hopped wort are separated out, usually in a vessel called a "whirlpool" or "settling tank". The whirlpool was devised by Henry Ranulph Hudston while working for the Molson Brewery in 1960. It uses the same hydrodynamic effect as the tea leaf paradox, causing denser solids known as "trub"—including coagulated proteins and hop material—to collect in a cone at the centre of the tank. Whirlpool systems vary: smaller breweries tend to use the brew kettle, larger breweries use a separate tank, and design will differ, with tank floors either flat, sloped, conical or with a cup in the centre. The principle in all is that by swirling the wort the centripetal force will push the trub into a cone at the centre of the bottom of the tank, where it can be easily removed.

=== Hopback ===
A hopback is a traditional chamber between the brewing kettle and wort chiller that acts as a sieve or filter by using whole hops to clear debris (or "trub") from the unfermented wort, as the whirlpool does, and also to increase hop aroma in the finished beer. Hops are added to the chamber, the hot wort from the kettle is run through it, and then immediately cooled in the wort chiller before entering the fermentation vessel. Hopbacks utilising a sealed chamber facilitate maximum retention of volatile hop aroma compounds that would normally be driven off when the hops contact the hot wort. While a hopback has a similar filtering effect as a whirlpool, it operates differently: a whirlpool uses centrifugal forces, while a hopback uses a layer of whole hops to act as a filter bed. Whirlpools are particularly suited to the removal of pelleted hops, whereas hopbacks are generally used to remove whole flower hops from the wort, retaining them as a filter bed. The hopback has mainly been substituted in modern breweries by the whirlpool.

=== Wort cooling ===
After the whirlpool, the wort is cooled to the appropriate fermentation temperature before being transferred to the fermentation area. In modern breweries this is achieved through a plate heat exchanger. A plate heat exchanger has several ridged plates, which form two separate paths. The wort is pumped into the heat exchanger and goes through every other gap between the plates. The cooling medium, usually water from a cold liquor tank, goes through the other gaps. The ridges in the plates ensure turbulent flow. Wort is typically cooled in a plate heat exchanger from near boiling point to the appropriate pitching temperature. Cooling may use a single-stage system with chilled water, or a multi-stage system using water followed by a secondary coolant such as glycol. After cooling, the wort is oxygenated before fermentation to provide oxygen required for yeast development.

While boiling, it is useful to recover some of the energy used to boil the wort. On its way out of the brewery, the steam created during the boil is passed over a coil through which unheated water flows. By adjusting the rate of flow, the output temperature of the water can be controlled. This is also often done using a plate heat exchanger. The water is then stored for later use in the next mash, in equipment cleaning, or wherever necessary. Another common method of energy recovery takes place during the wort cooling. When cold water is used to cool the wort in a heat exchanger, the water is significantly warmed. In an efficient brewery, cold water is passed through the heat exchanger at a rate set to maximise the water's temperature upon exiting. This now-hot water is then stored in a hot water tank.

== Fermenting ==
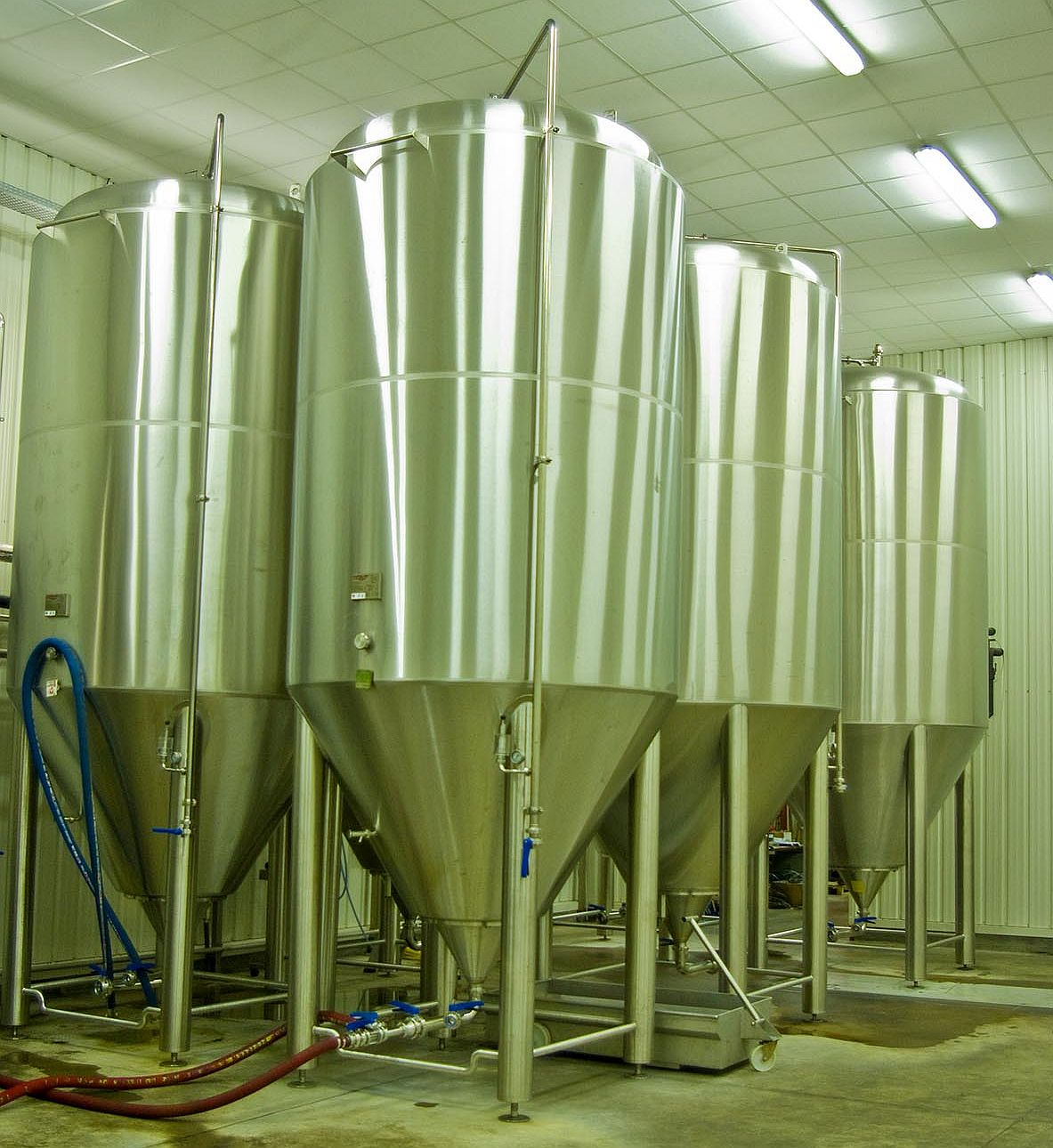
Modern closed fermentation vessels

Fermentation takes place in fermentation vessels which come in various forms, from enormous cylindroconical vessels, through open stone vessels, to wooden vats. After the wort is cooled and aerated – usually with sterile air – yeast is added to it, and it begins to ferment. It is during this stage that sugars won from the malt are converted into alcohol and carbon dioxide, and the product can be called beer for the first time.

Most breweries today use cylindroconical vessels, or CCVs, which have a conical bottom and a cylindrical top. The cone's angle is typically around 60°, an angle that will allow the yeast to flow towards the cone's apex, but is not so steep as to take up too much vertical space. CCVs can handle both fermenting and conditioning in the same tank. At the end of fermentation, the yeast and other solids which have fallen to the cone's apex can be simply flushed out of a port at the apex. Open fermentation vessels are also used, often for show in brewpubs, and in Europe in wheat beer fermentation. These vessels have no tops, which makes harvesting top-fermenting yeasts very easy. The open tops of the vessels make the risk of infection greater, but with proper cleaning procedures and careful protocol about who enters fermentation chambers, the risk can be well controlled. Fermentation tanks are typically made of stainless steel. If they are simple cylindrical tanks with beveled ends, they are arranged vertically, as opposed to conditioning tanks which are usually laid out horizontally. Only a very few breweries still use wooden vats for fermentation as wood is difficult to keep clean and infection-free and must be repitched more or less yearly.

=== Fermentation methods ===
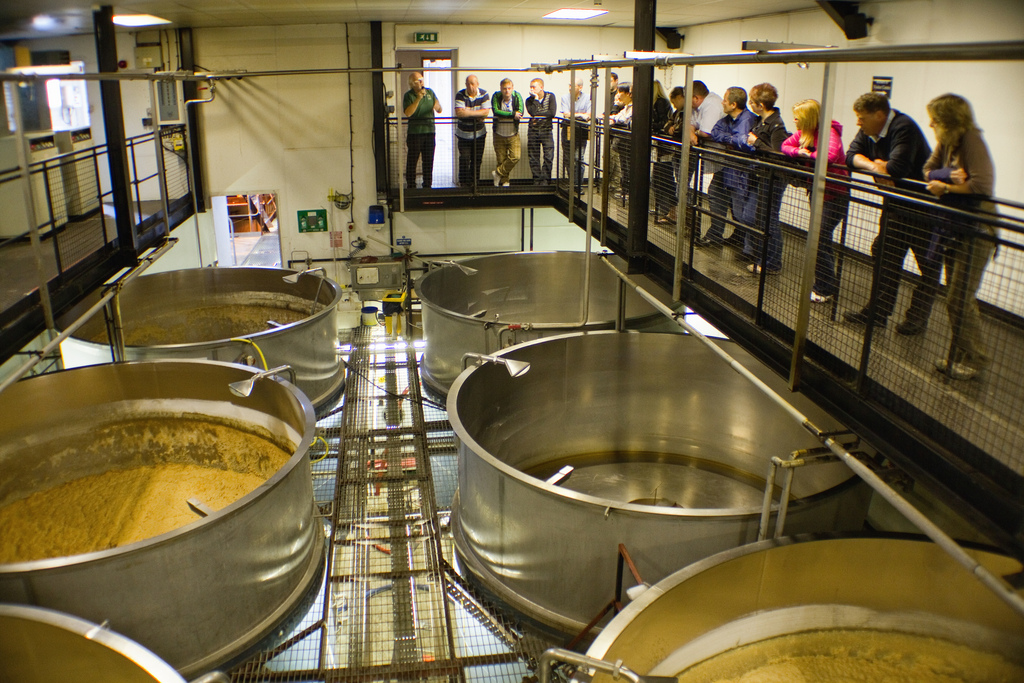
Open vessels showing fermentation taking place

There are three main fermentation methods, warm, cool, and wild or spontaneous. Fermentation may take place in open or closed vessels. There may be a secondary fermentation which can take place in the brewery, in the cask or in the bottle.

Brewing yeasts have traditionally been described as "top-fermenting" or "bottom-fermenting", and may be "top-cropped" or "bottom-cropped" according to where the yeast is collected from the fermentation vessel to be reused for the next brew. The yeasts classed as top-fermenting are generally used in warm fermentations, where they ferment quickly, and the yeasts classed as bottom-fermenting are used in cooler fermentations where they ferment more slowly. This terminology is somewhat inappropriate in the modern era; after the widespread application of brewing mycology it was discovered that the two separate collecting methods involved two different yeast species that favoured different temperature regimes, namely Saccharomyces cerevisiae in top-cropping at warmer temperatures and Saccharomyces pastorianus in bottom-cropping at cooler temperatures. As brewing methods changed in the 20th century, cylindro-conical fermenting vessels became the norm and the collection of yeast for both Saccharomyces species is done from the bottom of the fermenter. Thus the method of collection no longer implies a species association. There are a few remaining breweries who collect yeast by top-cropping, such as Samuel Smith's in Yorkshire using Yorkshire Squares, and several German hefeweizen producers. Marston's Burton Union system in Burton upon Trent, a historic top-cropping method, was retired in February 2024, with one set preserved by Thornbridge.

For both types, yeast is fully distributed through the beer while it is fermenting, and both equally flocculate (clump together and precipitate to the bottom of the vessel) when fermentation is finished. By no means do all top-cropping yeasts demonstrate this behaviour, but it features strongly in many English yeasts that may also exhibit chain forming (the failure of budded cells to break from the mother cell), which is in the technical sense different from true flocculation. The most common top-cropping brewer's yeast, Saccharomyces cerevisiae, is the same species as the common baking yeast. However, baking and brewing yeasts typically belong to different strains, cultivated to favour different characteristics: baking yeast strains are more aggressive, in order to carbonate dough in the shortest amount of time; brewing yeast strains act slower, but tend to tolerate higher alcohol concentrations (normally 12–15% abv is the maximum, though under special treatment some ethanol-tolerant strains can be coaxed up to around 20%). Modern quantitative genomics has revealed the complexity of Saccharomyces species to the extent that yeasts involved in beer and wine production commonly involve hybrids of so-called pure species. As such, the yeasts involved in what has been typically called top-cropping or top-fermenting ale may be both Saccharomyces cerevisiae and complex hybrids of Saccharomyces cerevisiae and Saccharomyces kudriavzevii. Three notable ales, Chimay, Orval and Westmalle, are fermented with these hybrid strains, which are identical to wine yeasts from Switzerland.

==== Warm fermentation ====
In general, yeasts such as Saccharomyces cerevisiae are fermented at warm temperatures between 15 and 20 °C (59 and 68 °F), occasionally as high as 24 °C (75 °F), while the yeast used by Brasserie Dupont for saison ferments even higher at 29 to 35 °C (84 to 95 °F). They generally form a foam on the surface of the fermenting beer, which is called barm, as during the fermentation process its hydrophobic surface causes the flocs to adhere to CO_{2} and rise; because of this, they are often referred to as "top-cropping" or "top-fermenting" – though this distinction is less clear in modern brewing with the use of cylindro-conical tanks. Generally, warm-fermented beers, which are usually termed ale, are ready to drink within three weeks after the beginning of fermentation, although some brewers will condition or mature them for several months.

==== Cool fermentation ====
When a beer has been brewed using a cool fermentation of around 10 °C (50 °F), compared to typical warm fermentation temperatures of 18 °C (64 °F), then stored (or lagered) for typically several weeks (or months) at temperatures close to freezing point, it is termed a "lager". During the lagering or storage phase several flavour components developed during fermentation dissipate, resulting in a "cleaner" flavour. Though it is the slow, cool fermentation and cold conditioning (or lagering) that defines the character of lager, the main technical difference is with the yeast generally used, which is Saccharomyces pastorianus. Technical differences include the ability of lager yeast to metabolise melibiose, and the tendency to settle at the bottom of the fermenter (though ale yeasts can also become bottom settling by selection); though these technical differences are not considered by scientists to be influential in the character or flavour of the finished beer, brewers feel otherwise – sometimes cultivating their own yeast strains which may suit their brewing equipment or for a particular purpose, such as brewing beers with a high abv.

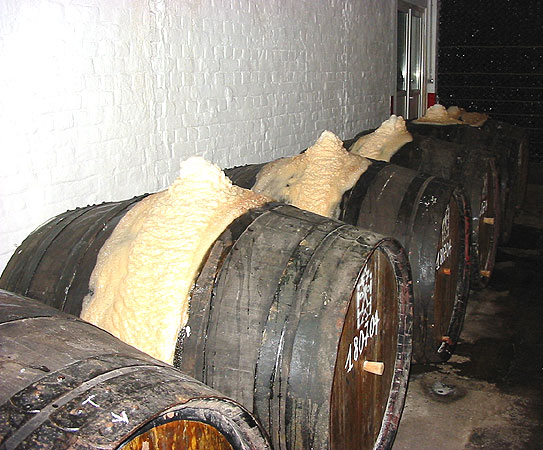
Spontaneous fermentation at Timmermans in Belgium

Brewers in Bavaria had for centuries been selecting cold-fermenting yeasts by storing ("lagern") their beers in cold alpine caves. The process of natural selection meant that the wild yeasts that were most cold tolerant would be the ones that would remain actively fermenting in the beer that was stored in the caves. A sample of these Bavarian yeasts was sent from the Spaten brewery in Munich to the Carlsberg brewery in Copenhagen in 1845 who began brewing with it. In 1883 Emile Hansen completed a study on pure yeast culture isolation and the pure strain obtained from Spaten went into industrial production in 1884 as Carlsberg yeast No 1. Another specialised pure yeast production plant was installed at the Heineken Brewery in Rotterdam the following year and together they began the supply of pure cultured yeast to brewers across Europe. This yeast strain was originally classified as Saccharomyces carlsbergensis, a now defunct species name which has been superseded by the currently accepted taxonomic classification Saccharomyces pastorianus.

==== Spontaneous fermentation ====
Lambic beers are historically brewed in Brussels and the nearby Pajottenland region of Belgium without any yeast inoculation. The wort is cooled in open vats (called "coolships"), where the yeasts and microbiota present in the brewery (such as Brettanomyces) are allowed to settle to create a spontaneous fermentation, and are then conditioned or matured in oak barrels for typically one to three years.

== Conditioning ==
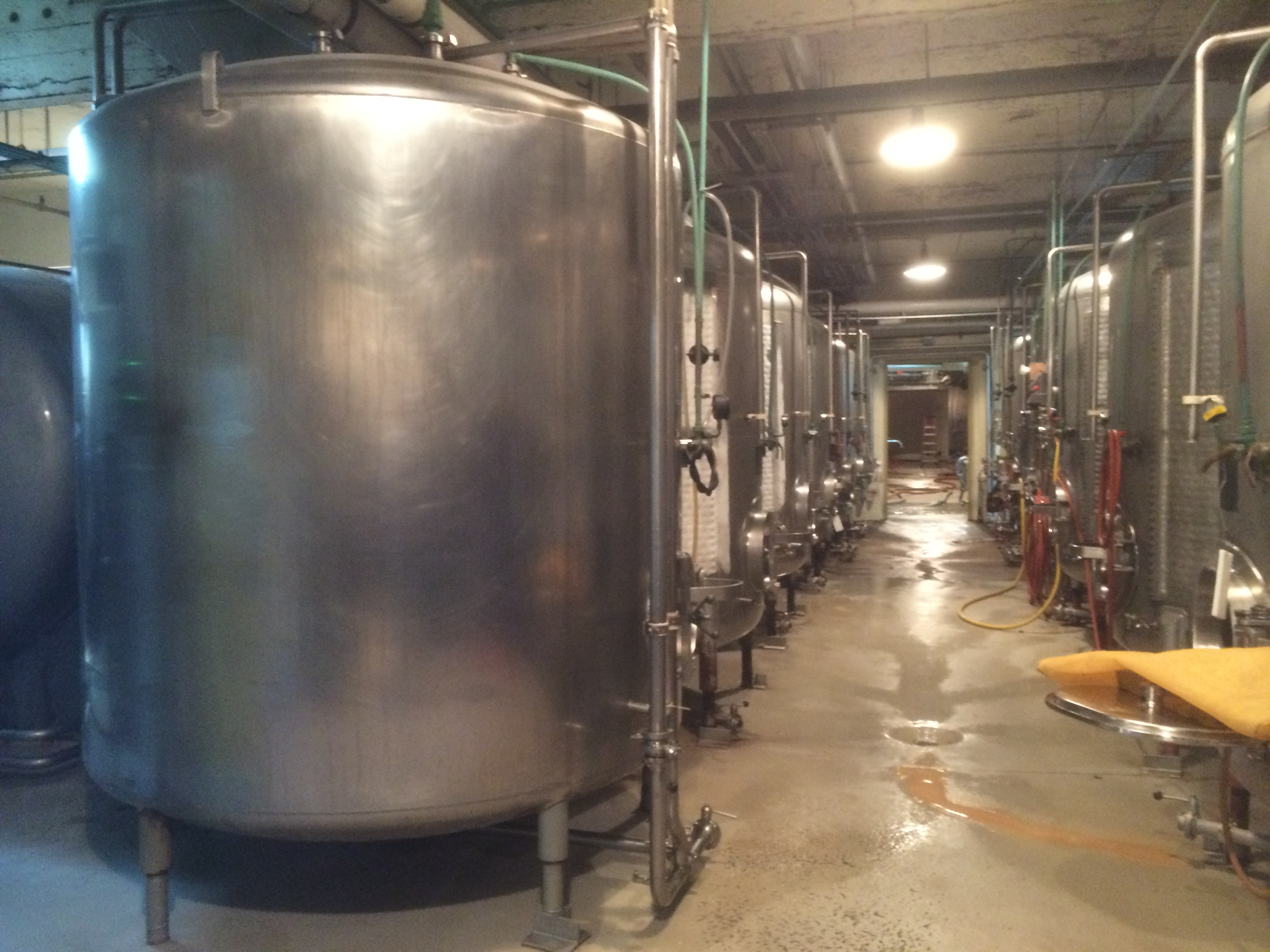
Conditioning tanks at Anchor Brewing Company

After an initial or primary fermentation, beer is conditioned, matured or aged, in one of several ways, which can take from 2 to 4 weeks, several months, or several years, depending on the brewer's intention for the beer. The beer is usually transferred into a second container, so that it is no longer exposed to the dead yeast and other debris (also known as "trub") that have settled to the bottom of the primary fermenter. This prevents the formation of unwanted flavours and harmful compounds such as acetaldehyde.

Kräusening

Kräusening (/ˈkrɔɪzɛnɪŋ/ KROY-zen-ing) is a conditioning method in which fermenting wort is added to the finished beer. The active yeast will restart fermentation in the finished beer, and so introduce fresh carbon dioxide; the conditioning tank will be then sealed so that the carbon dioxide is dissolved into the beer producing a lively "condition" or level of carbonation. The kräusening method may also be used to condition bottled beer.

Lagering

Lagers are stored at cellar temperature or below for 1–6 months while still on the yeast. The process of storing, or conditioning, or maturing, or aging a beer at a low temperature for a long period is called "lagering", and while it is associated with lagers, the process may also be done with ales, with the same result – that of cleaning up various chemicals, acids and compounds.

Secondary fermentation

During secondary fermentation, most of the remaining yeast will settle to the bottom of the second fermenter, yielding a less hazy product.

Bottle fermentation

Some beers undergo an additional fermentation in the bottle giving natural carbonation. This may be a second and/or third fermentation. They are bottled with a viable yeast population in suspension. If there is no residual fermentable sugar left, sugar or wort or both may be added in a process known as priming. The resulting fermentation generates CO_{2} that is trapped in the bottle, remaining in solution and providing natural carbonation. Bottle-conditioned beers may be either filled unfiltered directly from the fermentation or conditioning tank, or filtered and then reseeded with yeast.

Cask conditioning

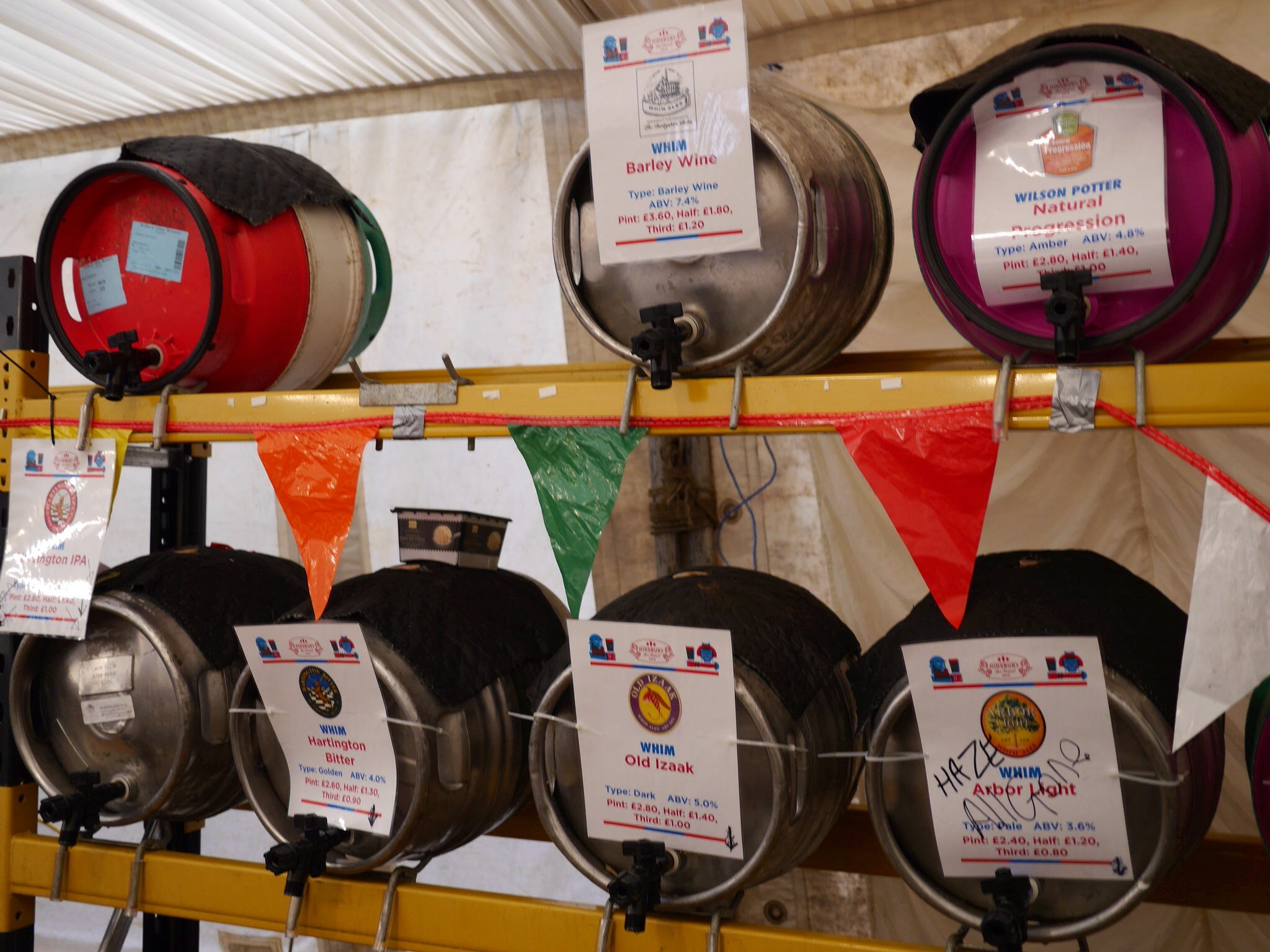
Cask ales with gravity dispense at a beer festival

Cask ale (or cask-conditioned beer) is unfiltered, unpasteurised beer that is conditioned by a secondary fermentation in a metal, plastic or wooden cask. It is dispensed from the cask by being either poured from a tap by gravity, or pumped up from a cellar via a beer engine (hand pump). Sometimes a cask breather is used to keep the beer fresh by allowing carbon dioxide to replace oxygen as the beer is drawn off the cask. Until 2018, the Campaign for Real Ale (CAMRA) defined real ale as beer "served without the use of extraneous carbon dioxide", which would disallow the use of a cask breather, a policy which was reversed in April 2018 to allow beer served with the use of cask breathers to meet its definition of real ale.

Barrel-ageing

Barrel-ageing (US: Barrel aging) is the process of ageing beer in wooden barrels to achieve a variety of effects in the final product. Sour beers such as lambics are fully fermented in wood, while other beers are aged in barrels which were previously used for maturing wines or spirits. In 2016 "Craft Beer and Brewing" wrote: "Barrel-aged beers are so trendy that nearly every taphouse and beer store has a section of them.

== Filtering ==
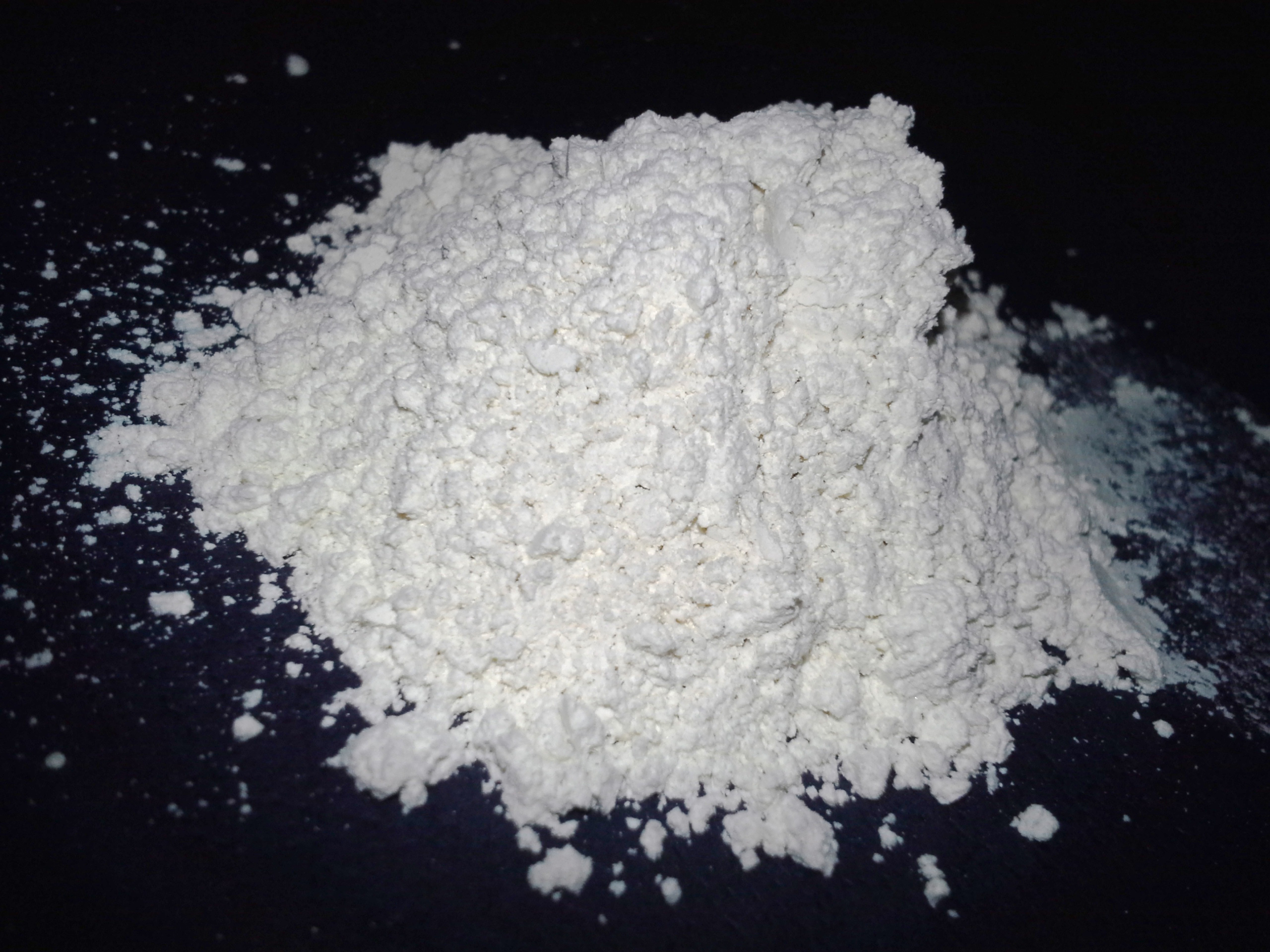
Diatomaceous earth, used to create a filtration bed

Filtering helps stabilise the flavour of beer, holding it at a point acceptable to the brewer, and preventing further development from the yeast, which under poor conditions can release negative components and flavours. Filtering also removes haze, producing a clear beer with a "polished shine and brilliance". Clear beer became commercially desirable with the increasing use of glass drinking vessels and the development of pale lagers. During lagering, suspended material settles out, allowing the beer to "drop bright" and develop a naturally clear appearance.

There are several forms of filters; they may be in the form of sheets or "candles", or they may be a fine powder such as diatomaceous earth (also called kieselguhr), which is added to the beer to form a filtration bed which allows liquid to pass, but holds onto suspended particles such as yeast. Filters range from rough filters that remove much of the yeast and any solids (e.g., hops, grain particles) left in the beer, to filters tight enough to strain colour and body from the beer. Filtration ratings are divided into rough, fine, and sterile. Rough filtration leaves some cloudiness and some character in the beer, while Fine filtration removes almost all cloudiness and microorganisms. Polysaccharides, proteins, yeast, bacteria and the brewing process may affect filtration.

== By-products ==
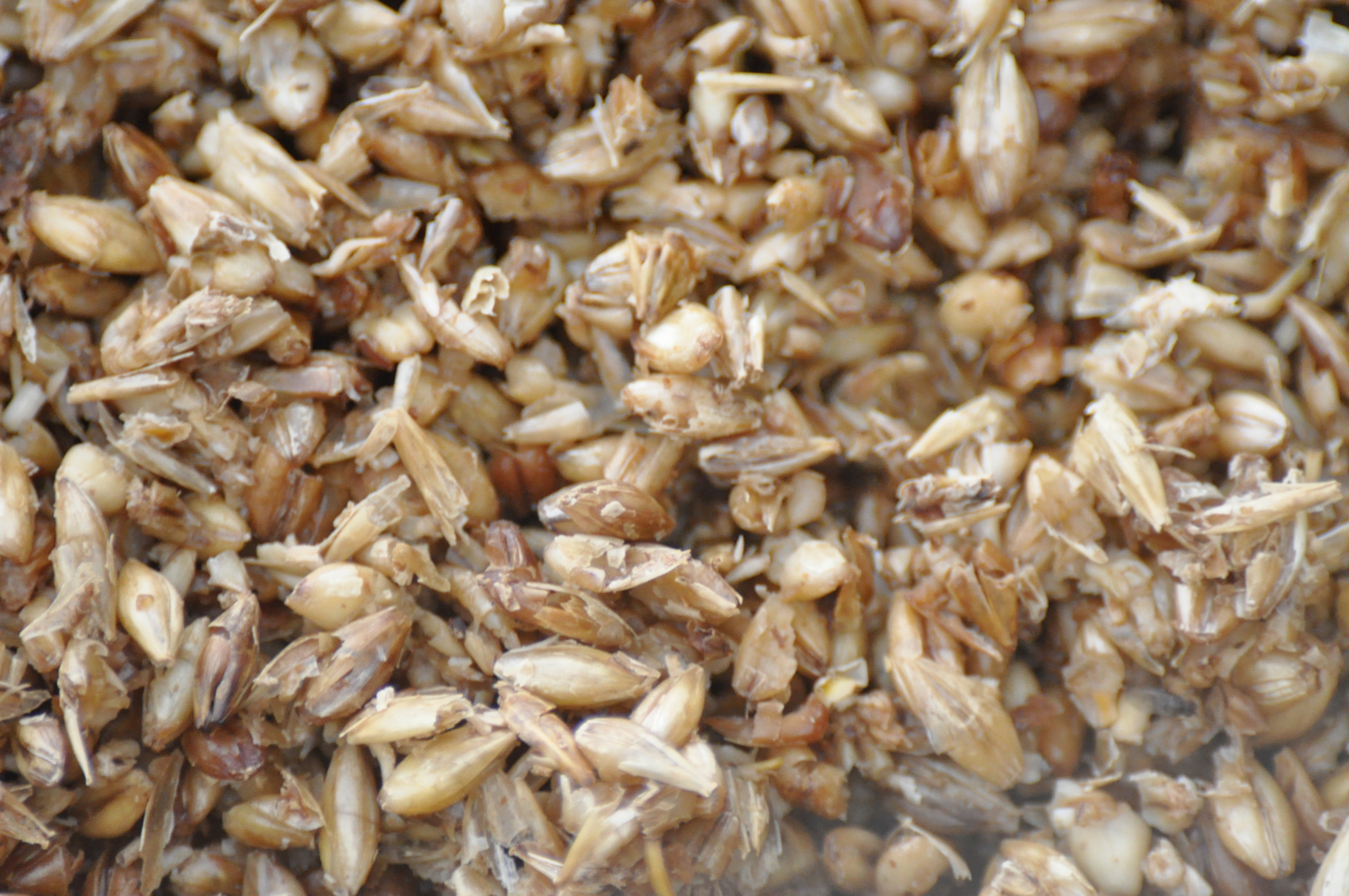
Spent grain, a brewing by-product

Brewing by-products are "spent grain" and the sediment (or "dregs") from the filtration process which may be dried and resold as "brewers dried yeast" for poultry feed, or made into yeast extract which is used in brands such as Vegemite and Marmite. The process of turning the yeast sediment into edible yeast extract was discovered by German scientist Justus von Liebig.

Brewer's spent grain (also called spent grain, brewer's grain or draff) is the main by-product of the brewing process; it consists of the residue of malt and grain which remains in the lauter tun after the lautering process. It consists primarily of grain husks, pericarp, and fragments of endosperm. As it mainly consists of carbohydrates and proteins, and is readily consumed by animals, spent grain is used in animal feed. Spent grains can also be used as fertiliser, whole grains in bread, as well as in the production of flour and biogas. Spent grain is also an ideal medium for growing mushrooms, such as shiitake, and some breweries are already either growing their own mushrooms or supplying spent grain to mushroom farms. Spent grains can be used in the production of red bricks, to improve the open porosity and reduce thermal conductivity of the ceramic mass.

== Brewing industry ==
The brewing industry is a global business, consisting of several dominant multinational companies, as well as many thousands of smaller producers - regional breweries, craft or microbreweries, and brewpubs. Global beer production was approximately 1.88 billion hectolitres in 2025.

The industry has undergone substantial consolidation since the late 20th century. Anheuser-Busch InBev is the world's largest brewing company by beer production volume. The company was formed when InBev acquired Anheuser-Busch in 2008 and expanded substantially through its acquisition of SABMiller in 2016. Other major brewing groups include Heineken, China Resources Snow Breweries, Carlsberg and Molson Coors.

Brewing at home is subject to regulation and prohibition in many countries. Restrictions on homebrewing were lifted in the UK in 1963, Australia followed suit in 1972, and the US in 1978, though individual states were allowed to pass their own laws limiting production.

== Sources ==
- Bamforth, Charles; Food, Fermentation and Micro-organisms, Wiley-Blackwell, 2005, ISBN 0-632-05987-7
- Bamforth, Charles; Beer: Tap into the Art and Science of Brewing, Oxford University Press, 2009
- Boulton, Christopher; Encyclopaedia of Brewing, Wiley-Blackwell, 2013, ISBN 978-1-4051-6744-4
- Briggs, Dennis E., et al.; Malting and Brewing Science, Aspen Publishers, 1982, ISBN 0-8342-1684-1
- Ensminger, Audrey; Foods & Nutrition Encyclopedia, CRC Press, 1994, ISBN 0-8493-8980-1
- Esslinger, Hans Michael; Handbook of Brewing: Processes, Technology, Markets, Wiley-VCH, 2009, ISBN 3-527-31674-4
- Hornsey, Ian Spencer; Brewing, Royal Society of Chemistry, 1999, ISBN 0-85404-568-6
- Hui, Yiu H.; Food Biotechnology, Wiley-IEEE, 1994, ISBN 0-471-18570-1
- Hui, Yiu H., and Smith, J. Scott; Food Processing: Principles and Applications, Wiley-Blackwell, 2004, ISBN 978-0-8138-1942-6
- Andrew G.H. Lea, John Raymond Piggott, John R. Piggott; Fermented Beverage Production, Kluwer Academic/Plenum Publishers, 2003, ISBN 0-306-47706-8
- McFarland, Ben; World's Best Beers, Sterling Publishing, 2009, ISBN 978-1-4027-6694-7
- Oliver, Garrett (ed); The Oxford Companion to Beer, Oxford University Press, 2011
- Priest, Fergus G.; Handbook of Brewing, CRC Press, 2006, ISBN 0-8247-2657-X
- Rabin, Dan and Forget, Carl; The Dictionary of Beer and Brewing, Fitzroy Dearborn/Taylor & Francis, 1998 ISBN 978-1-57958-078-0
- Stevens, Roger, et al.; Brewing: Science and Practice, Woodhead Publishing, 2004, ISBN 0-8493-2547-1
- Unger, Richard W.; Beer in the Middle Ages and the Renaissance, University of Pennsylvania Press, 2004, ISBN 0-8122-3795-1
