= Diatomaceous earth filtration =

Water filtration process

Diatomaceous earth filtration is a special filtration process that removes particles from liquids as it passes through a layer of fossilized remains of microscopic water organism called diatoms. These diatoms are mined from diatomite deposits which are located along the Earth's surface as they have accumulated in sediment of open and moving bodies of water. Obtained diatomaceous earth is then purified using acid leaching or liquid-liquid extraction in order for it to be used in any form of application. The process of diatomaceous earth (DE) filtration is composed of three main stages: pre-coating, body feed, and cleaning.

Due to the precision of DE filtration (being able to capture dangerous and microscopic particles while maintaining efficiency) has allowed DE filters to be a highly popularized choice for aquariums, wastewater treatment, food and beverage filtration, and more purposes.

== Function ==
=== Swimming pools ===
Diatomaceous earth filters has been generally accepted to be the top contender for removing pollutants while having a high efficiency rate. When applied to pool filtration, a DE filter has demonstrated its capability in capturing varying particle sizes to maintain water clarity. Recent studies show that diatomaceous earth filters have been able to remove particles, ranging from 1–6 micrometers (micron) in size, thus maximizing water quality. This degree of filtration allows small particles to be removed including bacteria, algae, viruses and other microscopic particles. Many of these particles come from bodily fluids, fecal matter, and other bacteria that can contaminate the water. Although there are coagulants, such as chlorine, that can be added to aid the filtration process by eliminating such particles; common pollutants that can not be efficiently removed by chlorine can include cryptosporidium, giardia duodenalis, pseudomonas aeruginosa and more. These parasites often have a high tolerance to chlorine and therefore are resistant to removal through conventional means such as coagulation. Despite this, outbreaks of cryptosporidium or giardia are seemingly low and in recent studies conducted in Atlanta, Georgia: out of 160 pools, 13 pool samples (18.1%) tested positive for at least one of both parasites.

==== Other possible bacteria, viruses, parasites ====
A number of organisms may be found in swimming pools, including Campylobacter, Cercariae, Escherichia coli (E. coli), Hepatitis A, Norovirus, Legionella, Shigella, and Staphylococcus.

Considering the nature of certain bacteria, viruses, and parasites filtration is a key component in ensuring the well-being of those that utilize swimming pools. If a diatomaceous earth filter is employed and properly designed, the application can prove to be extremely efficient in the removal and minimization of almost 100% of parasites. In order to achieve this, filtration media (diatomaceous earth) must be at least 4 micrometers to remove Cryptosporidium, and at least 7 micrometers to filter Giarda duodenalis. Research has shown that DE filtration can provide a greater reduction in parasite oocyst concentrations that other methods including conventional and granular media filtration. DE filtration studies showed 6 logs of removal of parasitic oocysts in a full-scale water treatment simulation. (6 logs refers to the reduction of a microorganism by 99.9999% of one million) Because of DE filters low micron rating, it is able to trap the smallest pollutant particles present.

DE filters usage in surface water treatment and recreational water treatment requires regular maintenance and depending on volume of water, maintenance and replacement may be required more frequently. Efficiency of filtration requires continuous flow of water through the filter, with periodic pressure checks. Maintenance must be conducted regularly and the filter must be backwashed every four to six weeks; with fresh DE media added after every backwash. If maintenance is not conducted properly, build of bacteria, viruses, and parasites may overflow and the efficiency will be comprised. Filtration systems do not guarantee full removal of possible contaminants; risk of bacteria, viruses, and parasites can still be present.

=== Food & beverage industry ===
Diatomaceous earth filtration can also be used in food and beverage application to eliminate contaminants including bacteria and microorganisms which can often change the quality of the consumable item. If bacteria and fungi are not removed from certain consumable liquids, it can result in long term contamination which affects the preservation and quality of the product. Many products must meet filtration requirements, for example: brewers must meet certain requirements during the production of certain alcohols including malt beverages (beer, ale, etc.). It is common that beer filtration must remove the turbidity, (yeast, hops resin, calcium oxalate) which can leave harmful microorganisms and affect the taste of the beverage. By conducting this filtration, microbes are eliminated improving the taste and appearance of the beer, while allowing preservation to be extended. While there are many ways to filter, diatomaceous earth filtration is used as a catcher, which intercepts particles in beer thus improving clarity. Diatomaceous earth has become a relatively simple choice for brewers, as it undergoes a natural process with no chemicals and quantity of DE can be adjust based on individual brewing needs.

== Major components and process ==
DE filters can be modified based on the planned function of this filter, but all basic DE filters are composed of similar parts. The process first begins with a direct pipeline to a raw water source, in which the water flow can be continuously controlled. Throughout the whole mechanism, it is recommended to use copper metal pipes as it is corrosion resistant.

=== Adjoining water pipes ===
Filtration of liquids must be supplied from a direct water source; which can vary in regards to location and water supply. Depending on the location or distribution of such fluids, the materials used to facilitate the flow of these fluids must be rust proof and corrosion resistant. Among the popular choice of materials, copper is the most commonly used element which has distributed safe drinking due to its strong characteristics resisting natural wear. In most industrial and non-commercial usage, copper piping used for fluids can also be insulated with sleeving or wrapping with polyphenylene ether pipe sleeves to grant additional protection. Some alternatives to metal depending on independent usages, can include water pipes made with polyvinyl chloride pipes (PVC), cross-linked polyethylene (PEX), and acrylonitrile butadiene styrene (ABS). This category of pipes utilizes plastic as they durable and can easily conformable; while being able to withstand high pressures and prevents rust or corrosion. During DE filtration, the same material for piping must be utilized throughout the process to maintain the purity of water flow as it undergoes the filtration process.

=== Precoat tank/body feed tank ===
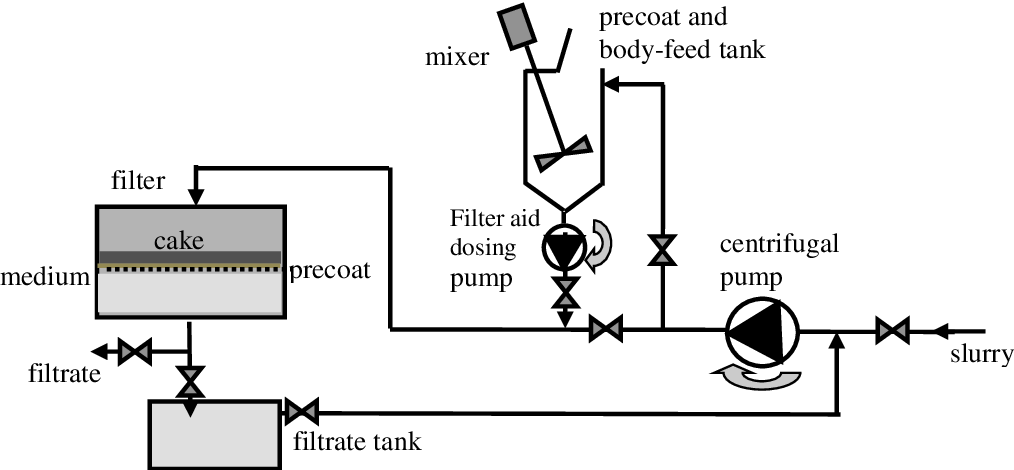
Common filtration flow diagram w/ pre-coat & body-feed

Fluids, commonly known as slurry, often consists of a mixture of particles varying in size which can not be efficiently filtered out by the main DE filter. Build up of such particles can increase pressure which results in reduced flow of liquid and a non-functional filter. To prevent this, the filtration process can include additional filter aid to distribute certain particles to prevent any problems that hinder the filtration process. Filter aid are solid particles that can improve the permeability and porosity to improve filtrate clarity by trapping specific sized particles while allowing continuous flow of liquids. When filter aid builds up it has a high porosity; although the volume may accumulate, approximately fifteen percent of the total volume is solid, which leaves the rest to be empty space. These filters can serve as a precoat that is applied prior to the filtration process. It is pumped through the filter press, simultaneously creating a porous filter cake on the specified filter cloths. Body feed is an additional filter aid which is often pumped throughout the whole filtration process to improve clarification and prevent build up of filter cake. Build up the filter cake can be detrimental as it becomes impermeable and can block the continuous flow of slurry. Usually, body feed is coarse and has a greater volume, which can assist filter cake build up while allowing particles to be efficiently removed. The pre-coat tank and body feed tank generally serve the same purpose which is to filter out larger particles that can impede the filtration process. Depending on the purity of the initial slurry, the quantity needed of either the body feed or pre-coat can vary.

=== Septum ===
The formation of filter cake does not occur spontaneously, and requires a membrane to support the accumulation of filter cake. This membrane is commonly known as the septum, which often is made up of plastic or metallic material that serves a similar function as mesh. The septum is porous and permeable with openings, allowing slurry to flow while diatomaceous earth accumulate and crowd the septum openings.

=== Water pressure regulator ===
Cycle times, improper maintenance, damaged septum, and an increase/decrease in flow can result in a change of pressure. Pressure is crucial to the efficiency in filtration: high pressure can damage the filter which can lead to unnecessary forces that push fluids to quickly through the septum. It is important to monitor the flow of filtrate as well as pre-coat and body feed to ensure that the proper flow is achieved with no hindrance.

== Manufactured diatomaceous filter types ==
=== Pressure filter ===
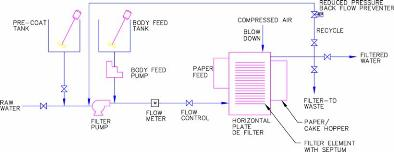
Typical diatomaceous earth pressurized filtration system flow diagram

A method for eliminating particulates like iron, magnesium, mill scale, and other precipitates involves the usage of a pressure filter. This type of filter comprises a sturdy filter vessel designed to withstand internal pressure, along with a network of pipes for water distribution and collection, and can incorporate one or more types of filter media. Pressure filters find widespread application in municipal water systems, industrial settings, residential well water systems, and swimming pools. These DE filtration systems are rather simple and can be used in a vertical or horizontal setting and can be modified to allow the application of multimedia filters. Pressure filter systems have a water inlet and outlet with the inlet site at the top and the water outlet at the base of the filter. As the water flows through water inlet, it will encounters a grid assembly covered in synthetic cloth which provides support for the diatomaceous earth cake. Gravity plays a part by forcing the flow of water to pass through the DE cake which filters out any unwanted particles. As the flow of water continues, water that has been clarified at the base of the filtration tank exits through the water outlet to any designated vessel. These pressure filters serve a general purpose and are most applicable where the flow of fluids is consistent, thus requiring internal pressure monitoring of filtrated fluids.

== Additional reading ==
- Drinking water treatment processes for removal of Cryptosporidium and Giardia
- Recommended Standards for WaterWorks
- List of State-Specific Water Quality Standards for Turbidity
- Water Turbidity Benchmarks (CA)
- Precoat Filtration with Body-feed and Variable
- What is Precoat and Body Feed?
- Handbook of Water and Wastewater Treatment Plant Operations, 4th Edition
- Written Report on FILTRATION (Marciano et al., 2011)
- Advanced Physiochemical Treatment Processes Volume 4 (Kang et al. 2006)
- Slow sand and diatomaceous earth filtration of cysts and other particulates (Schuler et al. 2003)
