= Filtered beer =

Beer from which the sediment has been removed

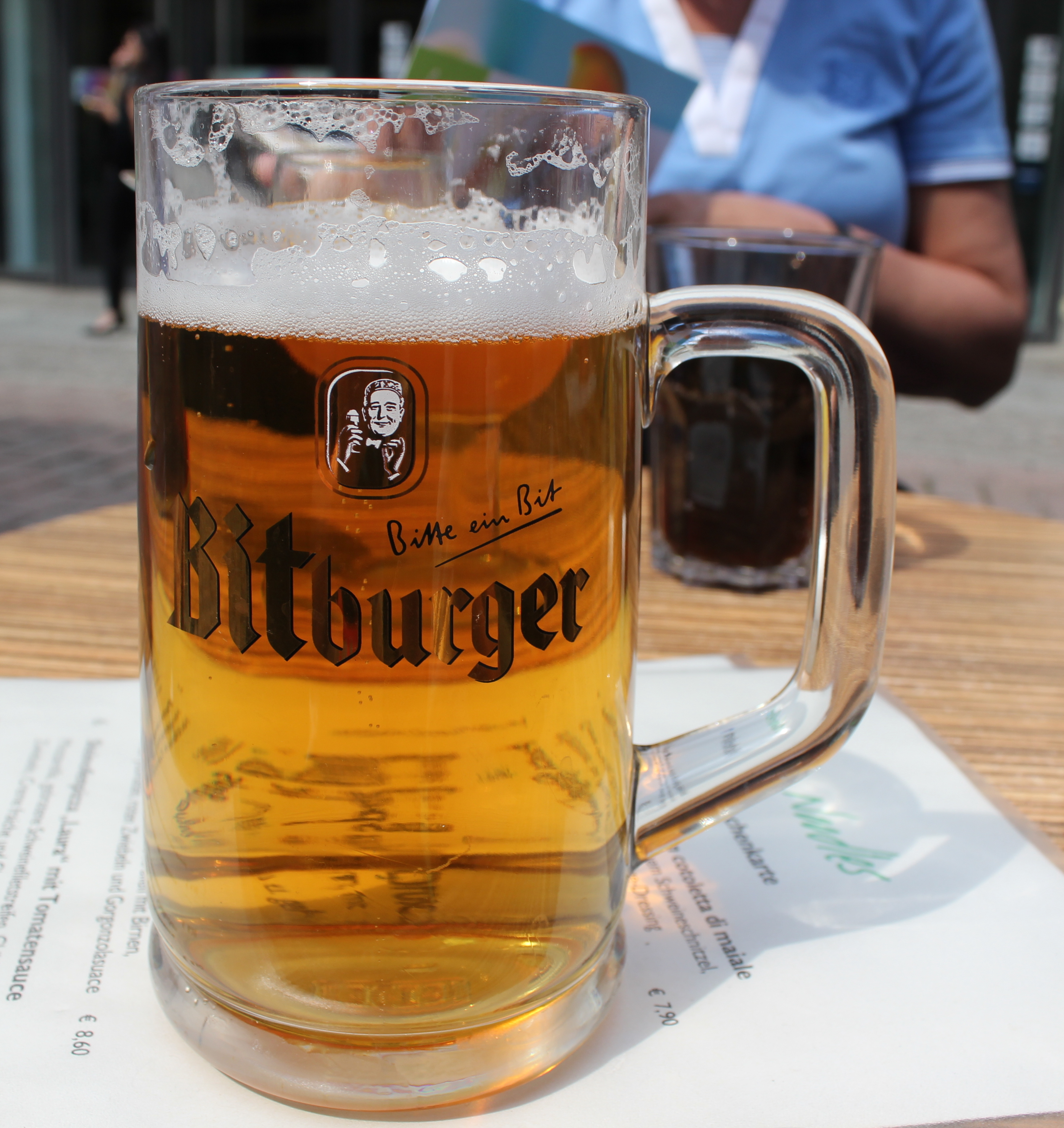
A filtered lager beer

Filtered beer refers to any ale, lager, or fermented malt beverage in which the sediment left over from the brewing process has been removed. Ancient techniques included the use of straw mats, cloth, or straws, and frequently left some sediment in the drink. Modern filtration, introduced at the end of the 19th century, uses a mechanical process that can remove all sediment, including yeast, as well as natural carbonation, from the beer. Such beer is known as bright beer and requires force carbonation before bottling or serving from a keg. In the United Kingdom, a beer which has been filtered in the brewery is known as "brewery-conditioned", as opposed to unfiltered bottle-conditioned and cask ales.

== Filtration ==
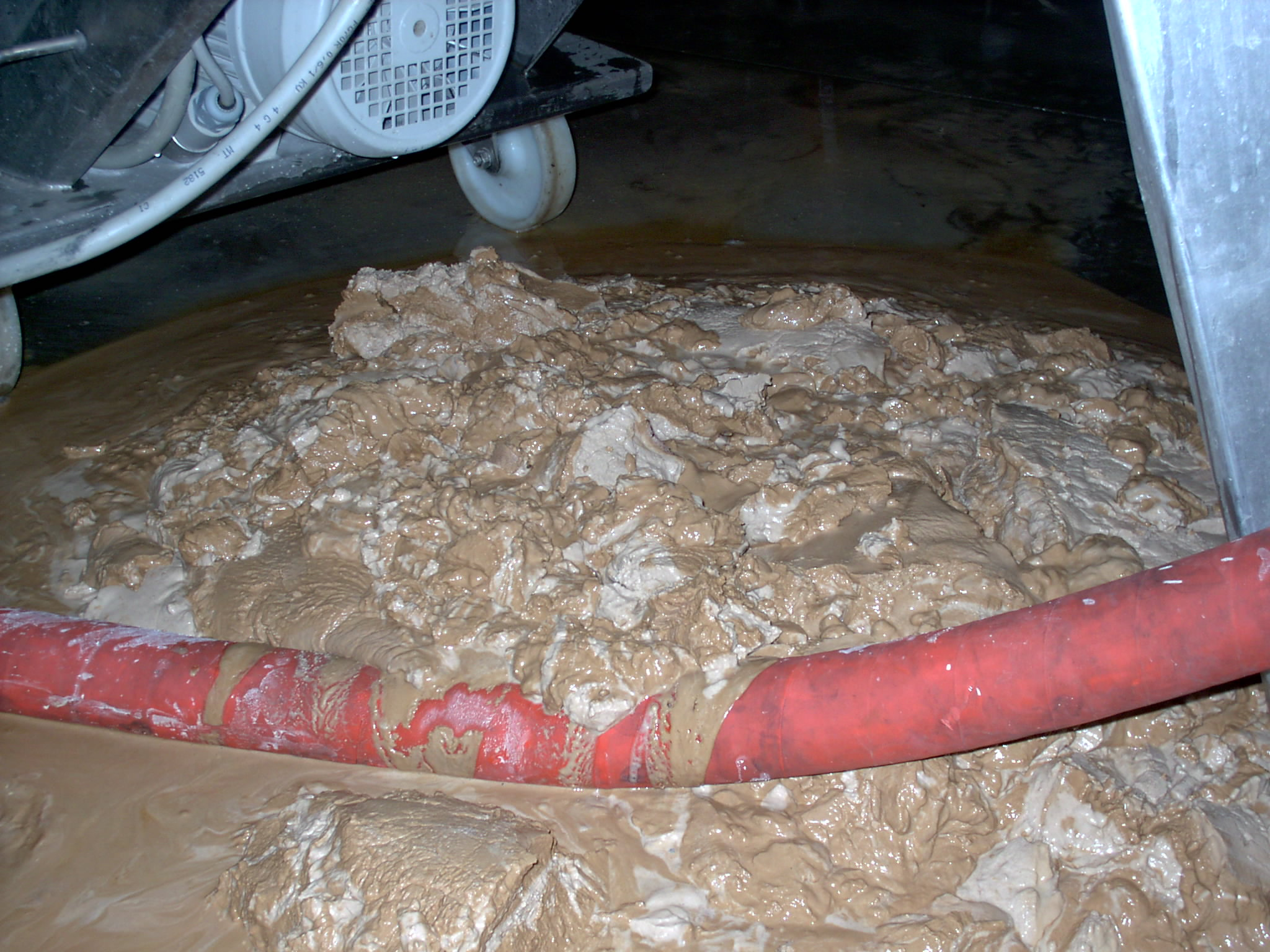
A mixture of diatomaceous earth and yeast after filtering

Filtered beer is mechanically filtered by flowing it through layers of filter material; the two main techniques are surface filtration and cake filtration. Filters range from rough filters that remove much of the yeast and any solids (e.g. hops, grain particles) left in the beer, to filters fine enough to strain constituents which give colour and body from the beer. The normal filtration ratings are defined as rough, fine or sterile. Rough filtration leaves some cloudiness in the beer, but it is noticeably clearer than unfiltered beer. Fine filtration yields a beer which is nearly transparent and not cloudy, although observation of the scattering of light through the beer will reveal the presence of some small particles. Finally, as its name implies, sterile filtration is fine enough that almost all microorganisms and sediments in the beer have been removed. Beer which has been filtered is usually held in "bright tanks" at the brewery before bottling or additional treatment.

A filtered beer is known as "brewery-conditioned", and has had all its natural conditioning stopped. This distinguishes it from beers which are in contact with live yeast, known as bottle- or cask-conditioned.

Sheet filters, or plate filters, use pre-made media and are relatively straightforward. The sheets are manufactured to allow only particles smaller than a given size through, and the brewer is free to choose how finely to filter the beer. The sheets are placed into the filtering frame, sterilized (with hot water, for example) and then used to filter the beer. The sheets can be flushed if the filter becomes blocked, and usually the sheets are disposable and are replaced between filtration sessions. Often the sheets contain powdered filtration media to aid in filtration.

Pre-made filters have two sides, one with loose holes and one with tight. Flow goes from the loose side to the tight.

Filter sheets are sold in nominal ratings, with 90% of particles larger than the rating caught by it. Sterile filtration requires a filtration level of 1 micrometre or less.

Filters that use a powder medium are considerably more complicated to operate, but can filter much more beer before needing to be regenerated. Common media include diatomaceous earth (kieselguhr) and perlite.

=== Cold filtering ===
Though all filtering is done cold, the term cold filtering is used for a process in which the beer is sufficiently chilled that some of its protein molecules clump together and are easier to filter out. Breweries tend to differentiate cold filtered beers from those that have been heat pasteurised.

== Bright beer ==
A "bright beer" is one which has been left (usually in a conditioning or lagering tank) to allow its yeast to settle to the bottom. Finings(such as silica gel, diatomaceous earth, isinglass, Irish moss, PVPP, and seaweed) may be introduced to induce it to "drop bright" more readily.

== Homebrewing ==
Beer filtration is common in homebrewing. Canister filters utilizing successive, replaceable filter cartridges or pads are often used. Most homebrewed beer will be filtered at least to 5 μm to remove the majority of yeast and sediment; some to 1.0 or 0.5 μm. Going finer risks removing beneficial flavor constituents and other desirable compounds.
