= Off-flavour =

Taints in food products caused by undesirable compounds

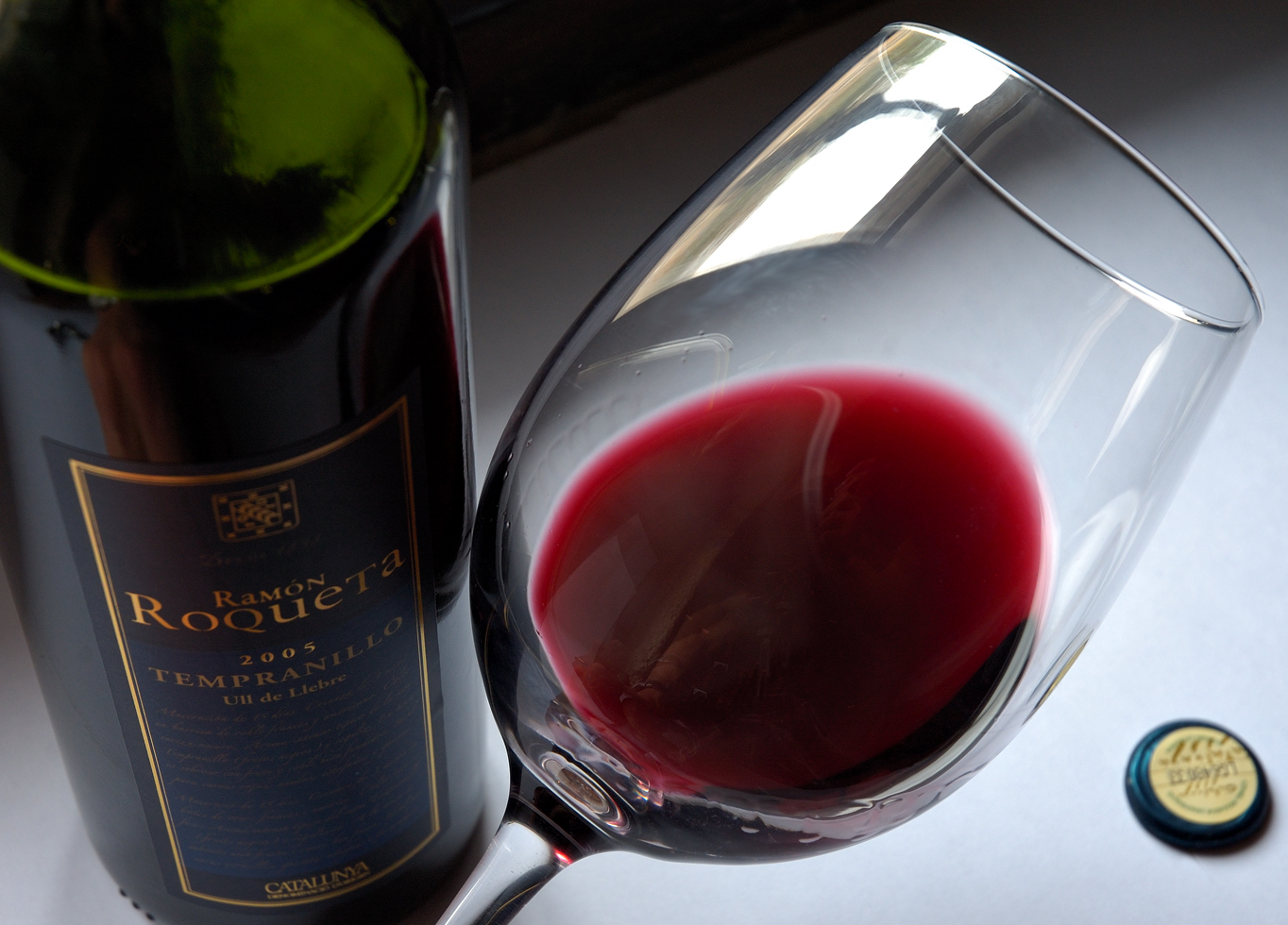
Tempranillo varietal wine bottle

Off-flavours or off-flavors (see spelling differences) are taints in food products caused by the presence of undesirable compounds. They can originate in raw materials, from chemical changes during food processing and storage, and from micro-organisms. Off-flavours are a recurring issue in drinking water supply and many food products.

Water bodies are often affected by geosmin and 2-methylisoborneol, affecting the flavour of water for drinking and of fish growing in that water. Haloanisoles similarly affect water bodies, and are a recognised cause of off-flavour in wine. Cows grazing on weeds such as wild garlic can produce a ‘weedy’ off-flavour in milk.

Many more examples can be seen throughout food production sectors including in oats, coffee, glucose syrup and brewing.
