= Bright beer =

Beer in which yeast is no longer in suspension

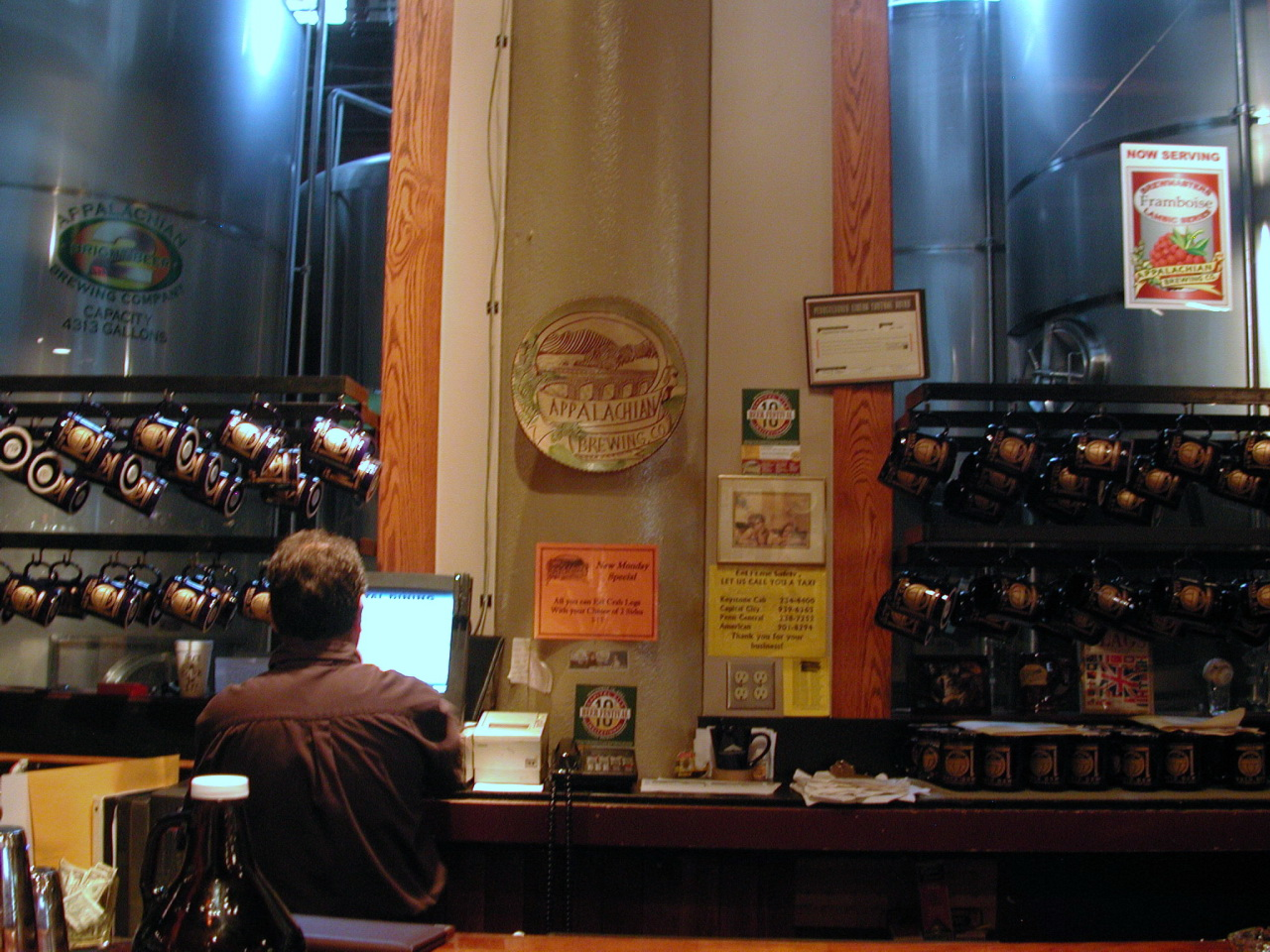
The bright tanks of the Appalachian Brewing Company

Bright beer is beer in which yeast is no longer in suspension. There are several methods used for clearing yeast from beer, from waiting for the yeast to drop of its own accord ("dropping bright") to filtering it.

== Dropping bright ==
When the concentration of fermentable sugars in the beer falls below a certain level, variable with the strain of yeast, the yeast cells will naturally flocculate and settle toward the bottom of the vessel in which the beer is stored; This act is known as dropping bright. The degree to which yeast flocculates is dependent on many factors, including the specific gravity of the beer, the gas pressure over the beer, the ambient temperature, and some biological properties particular to the yeast strain; some beers will never drop bright by themselves.

Some breweries make available rack bright beer, which is cask-conditioned beer that has dropped bright at the brewery and then been transferred to a new container for shipment leaving the sediment behind. Racked bright beer generally costs slightly more than ordinary beer but has the advantage of being able to be consumed immediately without the need to wait to allow the cask to rest.

In comparison, dropping bright beer requires more preparation time and care at the point of serving; it requires that the beer be left undisturbed to settle, as jarring or shaking its container will re-suspend the yeast.

Any beer which has dropped bright or fined will have a layer of yeast sediment at the bottom of its storage vessel.

=== Fining ===
Finings can be introduced during the production of beer in order to induce it to drop bright more readily. For British beers, the most common fining agent is isinglass, and most breweries producing Real Ale introduce isinglass into the shipment cask so that the beer will drop bright readily upon the cask's being breached; this process can take from several hours to two or three days and may require the addition of supplementary finings by the cellarman.

== Filtration ==
In contrast to dropping bright, yeast may also be removed from beer through filtration. The process of filtering removes carbonation and means the beer requires force carbonation. Mechanical filtering and pasteurisation of bottled beer started at the end of the 19th century. The first beer known to have been mechanically filtered and force carbonated as draught keg beer was Watneys Red Barrel in 1931.

== See also ==
- Cask ale
- Draught beer
- Keg beer
