= Glycol chiller =

Refrigeration system

Glycol chillers are specialized refrigeration systems, and often involves the use of antifreeze. A popular application is in beverage production, wherein the food grade chemical propylene glycol is used.

== Cooling in Brewing and Other Applications ==
Glycol chillers are a specific kind of refrigeration system, often used to cool a variety of liquids, including alcohol and other beverages. Using a chiller allows producers to lower the temperature of the product dramatically over a short period of time, depending on the production needs. Propylene glycol plays a significant role in the application of a glycol chiller. For cooling in brewing, there are few processes where decreasing or maintaining temperature are important - like crash cooling a beer after fermentation, or keeping a steady temperature during fermentation (which generates heat), or cooling the wort after an initial boiling process.

== Glycol chillers in operation ==
A chiller is essentially a refrigerator that includes a compressor, evaporator, condenser and a metering device. An additional buffer tank is used with the chilling unit to provide additional system capacity to prevent excessive cycling, unexpected temperature fluctuations, and erratic system operation.

Propylene glycol, a food-grade antifreeze, is typically used when consumable products are involved. Before using glycol in the brewing process, check that propylene glycol is of USP grade to ensure it is recommended for food use.

== See also ==
- Chiller
