= Trub (brewing) =

Sediment in beer during the brewing process

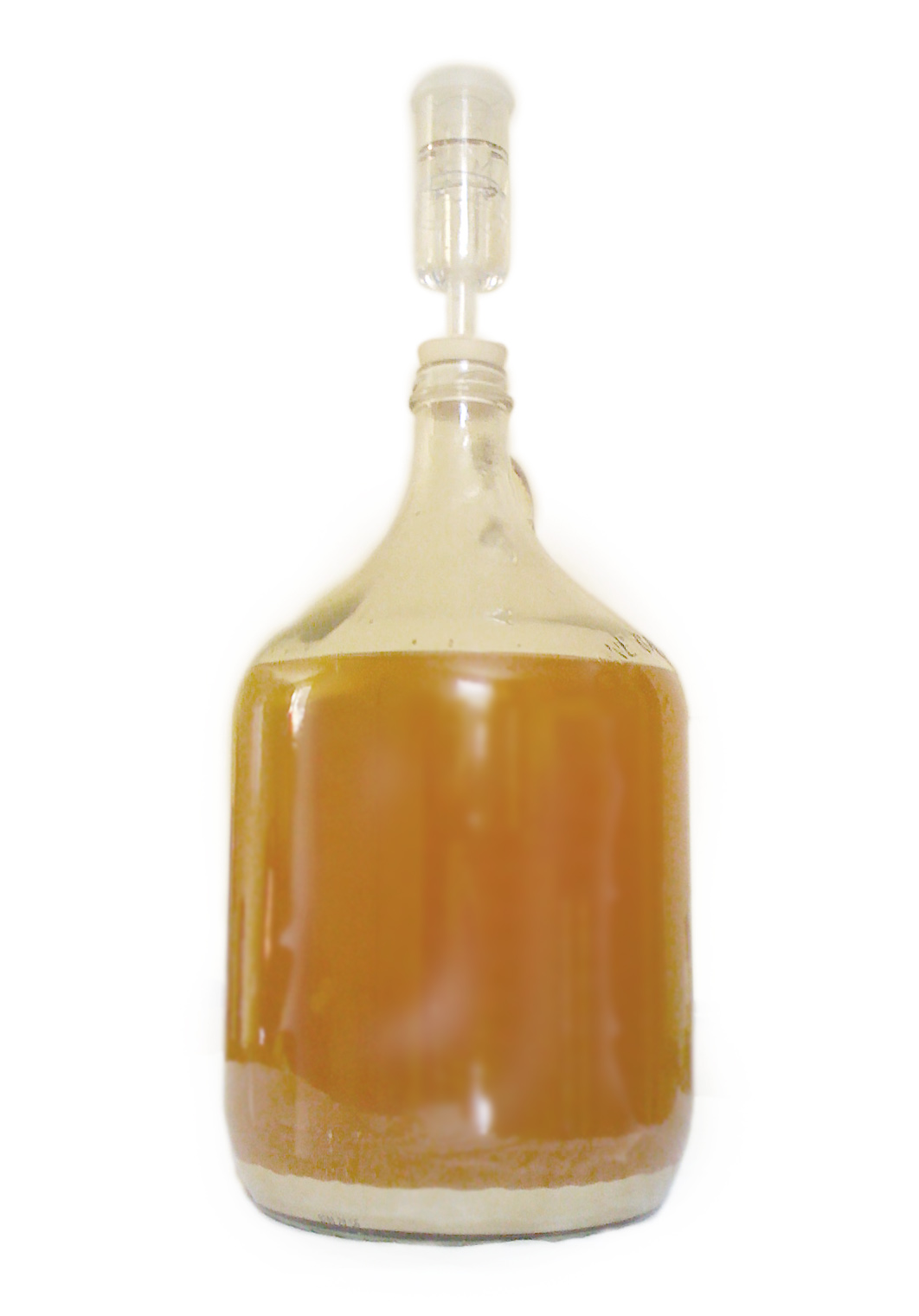
A home-brewing setup showing accumulated trub, or lees, at the bottom of the carboy

In the process of brewing beer, trub (/trub/ or /trup/) is the material, along with hop debris, left in the whirlpool or hopback after the wort has been boiled then transferred and cooled. Brewers generally prefer that the bulk of the trub be left in the whirlpool rather than stay in contact with the fermenting wort. Although it contains yeast nutrients, its presence can impart off-flavors in the finished beer.

Trub may also refer to the lees, or layer of sediment, left at the bottom of the fermenter after the yeast has completed the bulk of the fermentation.

It is composed mainly of heavy fats, coagulated proteins, and (when in the fermenter) inactive yeast.

The term has its origins in the German word trübe (also trüb), which means cloudy, via the brewing and winemaking terms Trubstoff (cloudy + material) and Weintrub (wine + cloudy).
