= National Beer Wholesalers Association =

Organization in the United States

- Abbreviation: NBWA
- Founded: 1938; 88 years ago
- Tax ID no.: 36-1521005
- Legal status: 501(c)(6)
- Headquarters: Alexandria, Virginia
- Location: United States
- President & CEO: Craig Purser
- Revenue: $19.3 million (2022)
- Website: www.nbwa.org

The National Beer Wholesalers Association (NBWA) is a trade association that represents the interests of nearly 5,000 beer distributors throughout the United States before government and the public. In 2022, their political action committee was the third largest, ranked by total amount raised.

== History ==
Founded in 1938 in the aftermath of Prohibition, NBWA represents nearly 5,000 licensed, independent beer distributors - and their approximately 142,000 employees - who have operations in every state and congressional district across the United States. The organization works to strengthen and maintain the state-based system of alcohol regulation.

== About ==
According to the association's web site, NBWA works to strengthen the state-based system of alcohol regulation that facilitates an orderly marketplace; creates a transparent and accountable system of alcohol distribution that protects American consumers; and promotes responsibility in the manufacture, distribution, sale and consumption of alcohol.

The association is led by Craig A. Purser, who became president and CEO in 2005. In 2007, NBWA was named among Washingtonian Magazine's list of "Great Places to Work."

NBWA's primary mission is to provide leadership, which enhances the independent beer and beverage distribution industry; to advocate before government and the public; to encourage the responsible consumption of alcohol; and to provide programs and services that will benefit its members.

== Political action committee ==
The National Beer Wholesalers Association Political Action Committee (NBWA PAC) is the largest political action committee (PAC) in the licensed beverage industry. According to OpenSecrets, the NBWA's PAC was the third-largest federal PAC during 2022, raising $4.1 million and distributing $3.3 million, behind the National Association of Realtors and Save America JFC. Over the last seven elections, their donations have been bipartisan, never surpassing 60% to a single party.

Political action committee summary data (2008 to 2024)
Election Year	Total Raised	Contributions	Democrats	Republicans
2024	$3,220,469	$1,215,500	47.3%	52.3%
2022	$4,094,018	$3,258,000	48.9%	51.0%
2020	$4,108,239	$3,147,500	52.8%	47.2%
2018	$4,312,886	$3,433,500	47.7%	52.3%
2016	$4,368,273	$3,328,700	42.6%	57.4%
2014	$4,171,593	$3,209,000	43.7%	56.3%
2012	$4,063,815	$3,388,500	41.3%	58.7%
2010	$3,775,164	$4,804,087	53.1%	46.9%
2008	$3,283,547	$2,897,000	52.4%	47.6%

== See also ==
- Wholesaling
- Beer distribution
- Prohibition in the United States
- Trade associations
