= GC-C =

GC-C may refer to:

- Guanylyl cyclase C, an enzyme
- Prodelphinidin B3 (Gallocatechin 4→8 catechin dimer), a condensed tannin
