= Market Wagon =

Ordering and delivery service in the US

Market Wagon, Inc.
- Company type: Private
- Industry: Food delivery, Grocery, E-commerce, Farmers Market
- Founded: 2017; 9 years ago in Indianapolis, Indiana
- Founder: Nick Carter, Dan Brunner
- Area served: Midwest, South
- Key people: Nick Carter, Co-founder; Dan Brunner, CEO
- Number of employees: 30
- Website: marketwagon.com

Market Wagon is a US-based online ordering and delivery service for ordering produce, meat, dairy, and prepared foods from local farmers and artisan food producers. It was founded in Indianapolis in 2016 and as of 2023 had 25 delivery hubs throughout the midwest and Tennessee. In 2022 and 2023 it was named to Inc.'s list of fastest growing businesses in the US.

== History ==
The company was founded in 2016 as FarmersMarket.com to deliver products from local food producers in Indianapolis to local residences and businesses. In 2017 it acquired an Evansville, Indiana business with a similar business model and rebranded as Market Wagon.

As of March 2017 they had 100 customers, all in the Central Indiana counties surrounding Indianapolis. By April 2018 they had expanded to cover Northwest Indiana and Southwest Indiana. By October 2018 the company had opened a fifth hub, the first outside Indiana, in Southwest Ohio serving Cincinnati and Dayton and the surrounding counties. At that time 23 farmers and artisan producers in Southwest Ohio had signed on. By March 2020 it was operating in Illinois, Indiana, Iowa, Michigan, Wisconsin, Minnesota and Ohio. During the coronavirus pandemic the app helped farmers navigate disrupted demand for their products. By early 2021 it was operating in fourteen states including Tennessee and Georgia. By 2023, it was operating 25 hubs throughout the Midwest.

In 2022 and 2023 Market Wagon was named to Inc.'s list of the fastest-growing businesses in the US.

== Business model ==
The business model revolves around an online ordering platform which allows customers to shop, order, and pay ahead of time for later delivery and charges a fee for each delivery. Deliveries are grouped into batches and delivered in insulated totes with cold packs on specified days each week to a given area. Totes and cold packs are exchanged at the next delivery. Alternatively customers can pick up from central delivery hubs and pay no delivery fee. Market Wagon collects a portion of the purchase price from orders. According to baker Debra Liston, "Since [customers] order, I know exactly what to make and I sell it, where like at a farmers market, I might show up with 20 loaves of bread and sell seven and then I’ve got 13 loaves of bread to deal with. That’s what makes [Market Wagon] super-attractive.”

== Coronavirus pandemic ==
Small farmers in Ohio credited their survival of the coronavirus pandemic shutdowns of 2020 to their use of the service. During the pandemic restaurants also listed prepared foods for distribution.
