= Slackness =

Slackness may refer to:

- Slackness (Jamaican music), a subgenre of dancehall music
- Slackness, the lack of tension (physics)
- Resource slack in business
- Laziness
- Vulgarity in West Indian culture and behavior

== Music ==
- Slackness, album by The Slackers

== See also ==
- Slack (disambiguation)
