= Prodelphinidin =

Chemical structure of prodelphinidin B3

Prodelphinidin is a name for the polymeric tannins composed of gallocatechin. It yields delphinidin during depolymerisation under oxidative conditions.

== Natural occurrences ==
Prodelphinidins are one of the two sorts of tannins in grape (the other being procyanidins) being produced especially in the skin of the berry.

Prodelphinidins can be found in Cistus salviifolius. Gallocatechin-(4→8)-catechin (prodelphinidin B3), gallocatechin-(4→8)-gallocatechin and catechin-(4→8)-gallocatechin can be found in the pomegranate peels. Prodelphinidin B-2 3'-O-gallate can be found in green tea leaves and prodelphinidin B-2 3,3'-di-O-gallate can be found in Myrica rubra.

== Particular oligomeric prodelphinidins ==
Prodelphinidin B3 (gallocatechin-(4α→8)-catechin) and prodelphinidin B9 (epigallocatechin-(4α→8)-catechin) can be isolated in beer. Prodelphinidin C2 (gallocatechin-(4α→8)-gallocatechin-(4α→8)-catechin) can be isolated in malt.

The A-type proanthocyanidin epigallocatechin-(2β→7,4β→8)-epicatechin can be found in the leaves of Dioclea lasiophylla,

== See also ==
- Crofelemer, a complex mixture of procyanidins and prodelphinidins from the latex of the South American tree Croton lechleri (locally called Sangre de Grado or Sangre de Drago)
