= Impact of the COVID-19 pandemic on the food industry =

Impact of COVID-19

The COVID-19 pandemic affects the global food industry as governments close down restaurants and bars to slow the spread of the virus. Across the world, restaurants' daily traffic dropped precipitously compared to the same period in 2019. Closures of restaurants caused a ripple effect among related industries such as food production, liquor, wine, and beer production, food and beverage shipping, fishing, and farming.

The issues were particularly disruptive in industrialized areas where large proportions of entire categories of food are typically imported using just-in-time logistics.

The pandemic also accelerated existing trends within the restaurant sector, particularly the adoption of technology for enhanced customer experiences. Mobile apps for ordering and reservations, QR code-based menus, and data analytics for personalized marketing gained prominence.

In June 2020, the United Nations warned that the world was facing the worst food crisis in half a century due to the recession caused by the pandemic.

== Global impact ==
Global food security expert Peter Alexander of the University of Edinburgh said that the free-market, just-in-time logistical systems common in industrialized areas are very good at dealing with disruptions in one place or sudden shortages of one commodity but are more vulnerable to systemic shock because there is no slack in the system and no supply reserves to fall back on.

In many places there was panic buying with resulting shortages. There were some supply chain disruptions for some products; for instance, many hand pumps for hand sanitizer bottles are imported into the US from China and were in shorter supply. For most food products in the US normal resupply happened, but panic buying causing empty shelves contributed to consumers' impulse to stock up and hoard. A US food retail trade group advised retailers to accelerate ordering and consider rationing to prevent empty shelves. Food retailers were "among the most affected by the coronavirus, but one of the few businesses that might actually benefit," at least in the short term according to the television channel Cheddar. Some areas saw price gouging.

Food traffic to restaurants and cafes declined by 75% in Latin America, where as North America and Middle East markets saw a decline of 90% by end of March. Later on, as demand for certain agricultural products fell due to lockdowns and closure of restaurants, farmers reported a glut in supply, such as potatoes in the Netherlands and milk in the U.S. state of Wisconsin.

Online grocery shopping grew substantially during the pandemic. Small-scale farmers have been embracing digital technologies as a way to directly sell produce, and community-supported agriculture and direct-sell delivery systems are on the rise during the coronavirus pandemic.

Newly-homebound workers became interested in baking. In much of the world breadbaking became symbolic of resilience in response to the lockdowns.

== Hazard controls ==
For retail workers in food and grocery businesses, the U.S. Centers for Disease Control and Prevention and Occupational Safety and Health Administration have recommended specific COVID-19 hazard controls beyond general workplace recommendations. For employees, these include encouraging touchless payment options and minimizing handling of cash and credit cards, placing cash on the counter rather than passing it directly by hand, and routinely disinfecting frequently touched surfaces such as workstations, cash registers, payment terminals, door handles, tables, and countertops. Employers may place sneeze guards with a pass-through opening at the bottom of the barrier in checkout and customer service locations, use every other check-out lane, move the electronic payment terminal farther from the cashier, place visual cues such as floor decals to indicate where customers should stand during check out, provide remote shopping alternatives, and limit the maximum customer capacity at the door. Food workers experiencing clinical gastrointestinal or respiratory disease symptoms should not participate in food processing or preparation.

All types of food can potentially be contaminated though contact with any contaminated equipment, surfaces or environment. Proper cleaning and prevention of cross-contamination are critical in the control of foodborne illnesses. Once pathogens are deposited on surfaces by a previously contaminated product (cross-contamination), aerosols or touch from contaminated hands or clothing, they can survive on inanimate objects such as knives, saws, transport containers and conveyor belts made of metal, plastic and wood. Coronaviruses have been shown to remain infectious for up to nine days on such surfaces.

Good hygiene practices are particularly important when handling fresh foods that may be consumed raw and/or without any further processing. Examples include fresh fruits and vegetables and ready-to-use foods for consumption without further heat treatment. These can be particularly susceptible to contamination from the environment and food handlers. To minimize risk of exposure to any foodborne bacteria and viruses, it is important to keep food contact environments, equipment and tools clean, observe good handwashing practices, and separate raw and cooked foods and use clean water.

== Impacts by country ==
=== Australia ===
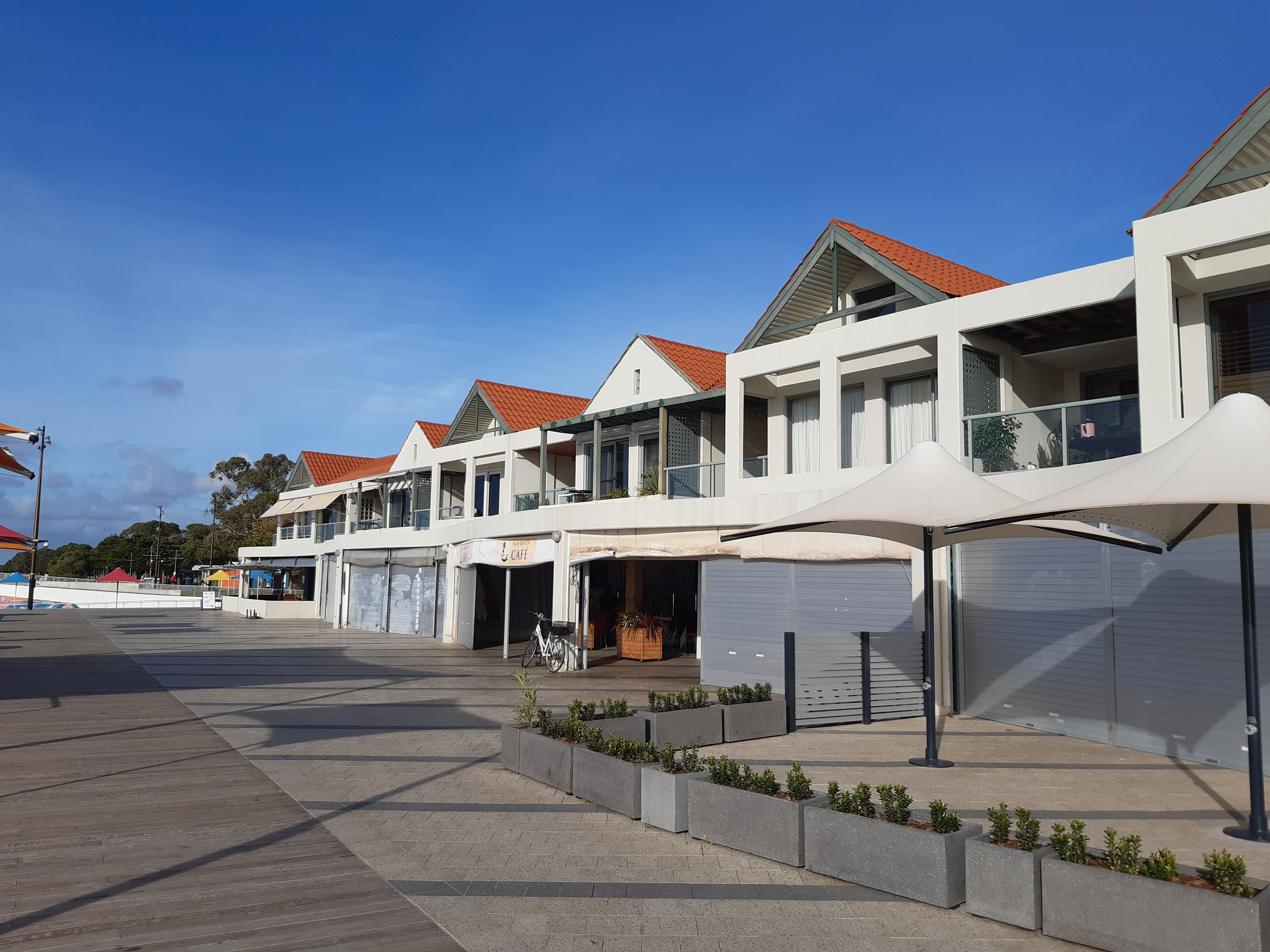
Restaurants in Western Australia, mostly closed due to the pandemic

In Melbourne, city officials announced a relief package for the Queen Victoria Market. According to Eater, petitions were circulating urging the state government to rescue the industry.

=== Brazil ===
On 23 March 2020, the Brazilian Association of Bars and Restaurants (Abrasel) reported that more than 3 million workers could lose their jobs over the next 40 days.

=== Canada ===
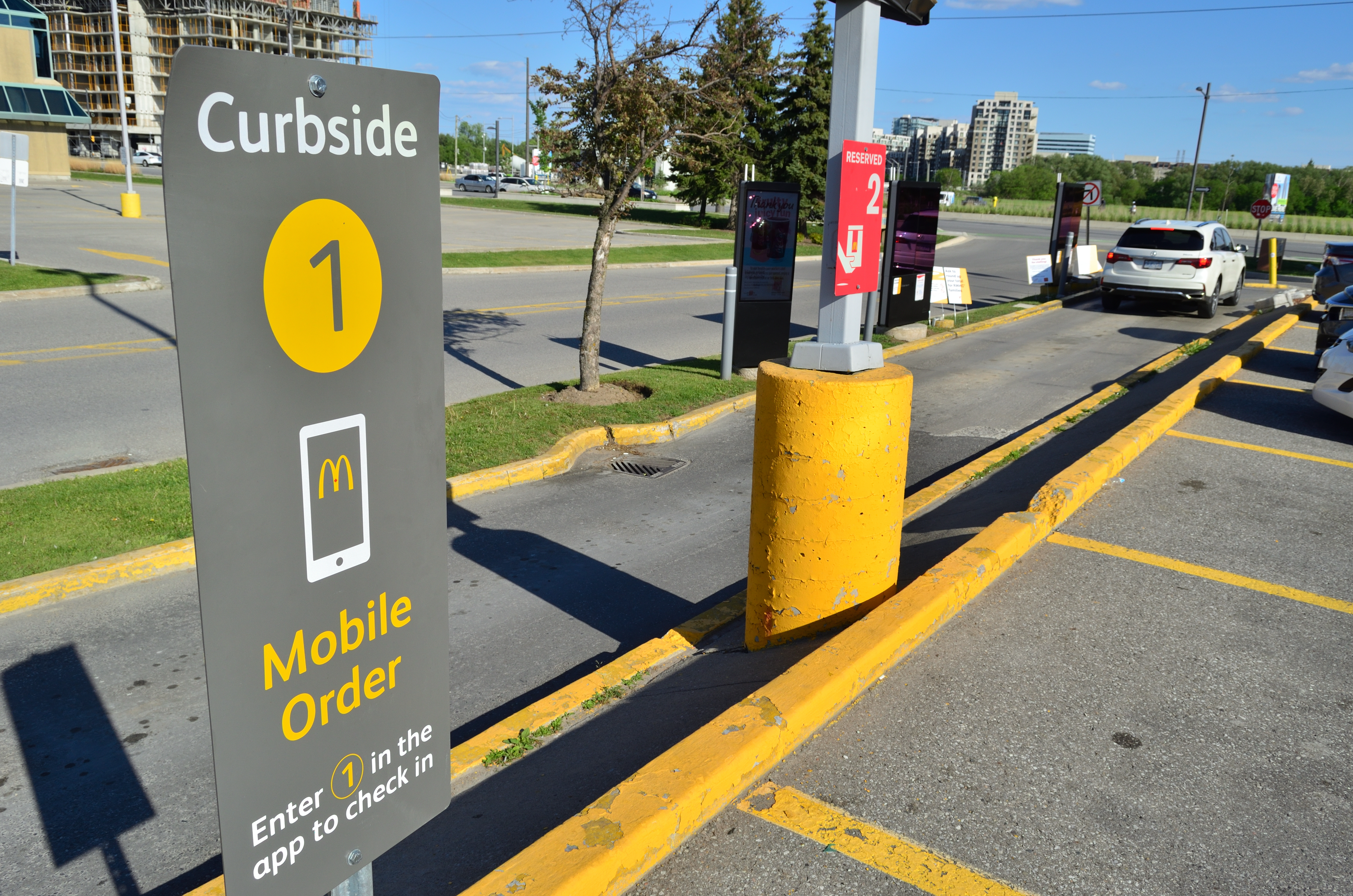
Curbside pickup at a McDonald's in Markham, Ontario

As of April 17, 2020, 15% of the infections in Alberta – 358 cases – have been connected to the Cargill meat processing plant in High River. The outbreak itself has been linked to an employee of a long-term care facility who had close contact with an employee of the plant in their household. The plant was idled by Cargill on 20 April.

=== China ===
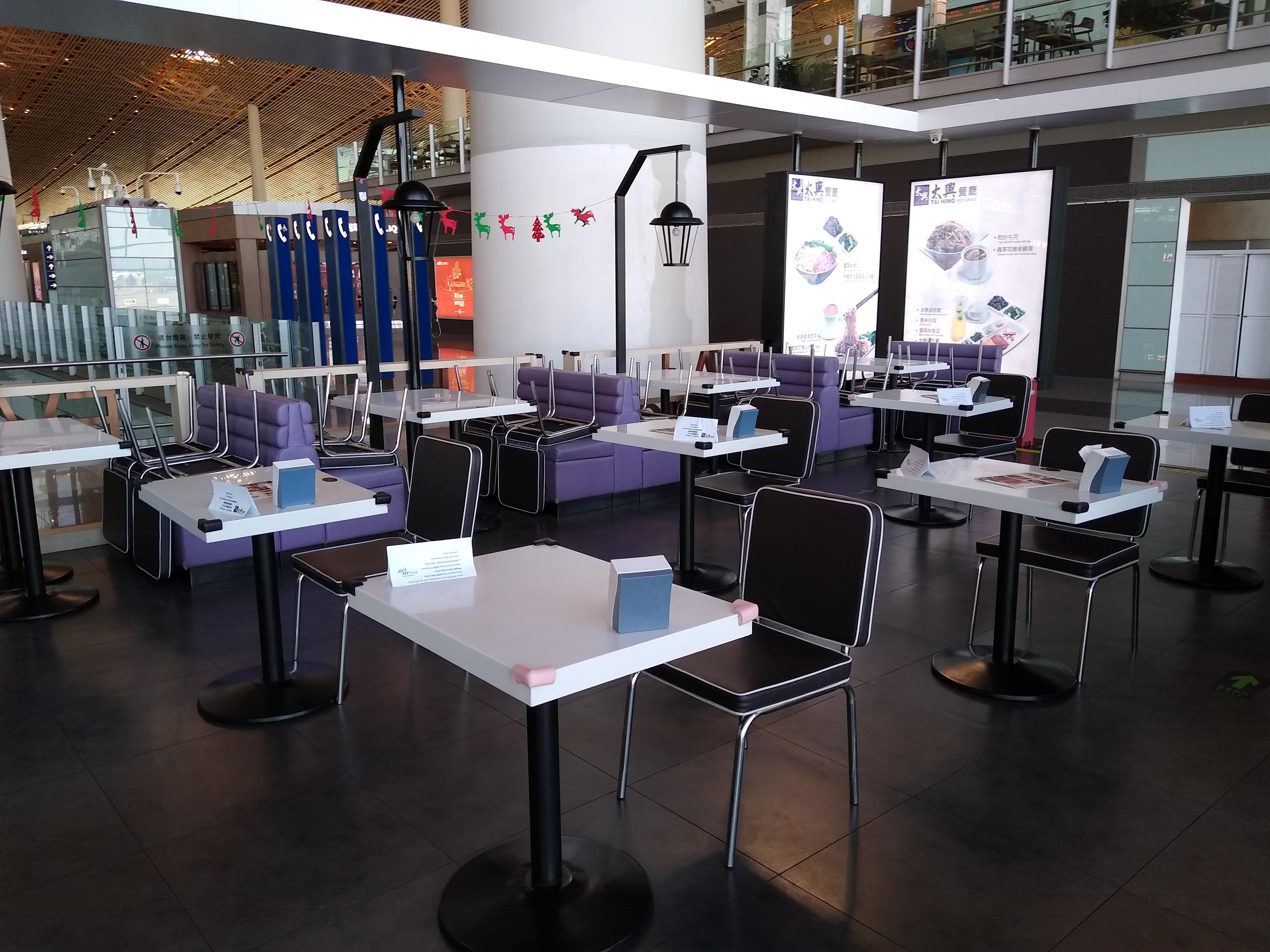
A restaurant in China during the pandemic, with chairs and tables rearranged for a minimum distance between customers

Starbucks, KFC, Pizza Hut, and McDonald's had closed restaurants in Wuhan or Hubei by 27 January. Because the closings came just before the Lunar New Year celebrations, they came "at probably the worst time for China," according to Jude Blanchette, head of China studies at the Center for Strategic and International Studies. The Lunar New Year as of 2020 was considered China's single most important economic event, with 2019 spending of US$150 billion. The service sector in 2020 represented 52% of China's economy.

By 24 March, Starbucks had reopened 95% of the 2000 restaurants that had closed, including some in Wuhan. Starbucks announced it expected a $400 million or more in lowered revenues for the fiscal second quarter because of the China closures.

Before the outbreak, about 54 percent of survey respondents bought food and groceries from supermarkets. During the pandemic, the proportion of consumers choosing to purchase food from supermarkets dropped to 35%, and the proportion of products purchased from farmers' markets dropped sharply from 23% to 10%. In contrast, consumers buying food and groceries online rose to 38 percent from 11 percent.

=== France ===
According to Eater, "The whole French food chain may become less individual and more corporate as only big restaurant groups like Alain Ducasse and major industrial food producers survive."

=== Germany ===
Fast casual chain Vapiano announced 20 March that it was insolvent and might have to declare bankruptcy, asking the German government for help.

=== Hungary ===
According to Eater, restaurants in Budapest depend heavily on tourism, and will likely not survive.

=== India ===
On 23 March 2020, the National Restaurants Association of India asked the Finance Ministry for a bailout for the industry. The economic value of the industry is estimated at ₹4,238.65 billion.

=== Ireland ===
All bars and pubs were closed in Ireland by 15 March. On 22 March, it was announced that all McDonald's outlets in Ireland would be closed from 7 pm on 23 March. The day after the McDonald's announcement, coffeehouse chain Costa Coffee and restaurant franchise Subway both announced they would shut their Irish outlets, as did doughnut company Krispy Kreme regarding its one Irish outlet in Dublin. The Irish fast food restaurant chain Supermac's announced the same day as the Costa and Subway closures that it would shut all its restaurants by the evening of 26 March; it intended the delay to allow emergency services using its facilities time to plan where they would eat, but did say it would shut its seating areas that night. By August 2020, McDonald's, Supermac's, Costa Coffee, Subway and Krispy Kreme reopened providing takeaway, delivery or drive thru services only.

As the third phase of the government's roadmap got underway on 29 June, all restaurants and cafés reopened serving on premises food and strict social distancing and cleaning measures in place. Pubs and bars reopened only if they served "substantial" meals of at least €9—according to the Government of Ireland and Fáilte Ireland. Indoor hospitality soon closed again in October after the government imposed a national six-week lockdown. On 4 December, thousands of restaurants, cafés and gastropubs reopened after six weeks of closure. On Christmas Eve, all restaurants, cafés and gastropubs closed again at 3 pm following the reimposition of lockdown restrictions until 12 January 2021 at the earliest, after a third wave of COVID-19 arrived in Ireland. Due to the repeated extension of the lockdown, they remained closed throughout the first five months of 2021.

Under the government's reopening plan throughout May and June 2021, all bars, restaurants and cafés reopened for outdoor service on 7 June, while indoor service remained closed. On 29 June, due to the rapidly increasing incidence of the Delta variant, the government announced that the planned reopening of indoor dining and drinking in restaurants and pubs on 5 July would be delayed. After further delays, the government eventually approved legislation for the resumption of indoor hospitality, with proofs of vaccination needed for those who were vaccinated or recovered from COVID-19, while those under 18 would be required to be accompanied by a fully vaccinated person. On 21 July, it was confirmed that indoor dining in pubs and restaurants could resume on Monday 26 July for fully vaccinated and COVID-19 recovered people, after President Michael D. Higgins signed the legislation underpinning new guidelines into law.

=== Italy ===
According to Eater, much of Italy's artisanal food production depends heavily on tourism, both directly and indirectly via restaurants, and may not survive.

In mid–July 2022, Domino's Pizza's Italian franchise EPizza SpA closed down all 29 of its stores. The company had declared bankruptcy in April 2022 after two years of declining sales caused by lockdown restrictions and competition from local pizza chains and restaurants, which began using food delivery apps in response to the COVID-19 pandemic in Italy.

=== Japan ===
Restaurant-related Diffusion Index (飲食関連DI, inshoku kanren dhīai) in March 2020 was felt down into 0.7 which was worst value ever. Torikizoku (鳥貴族), a yakitori-style izakaya chain, announced on 2 April that they would shut all 394 of their stores from 4 April to 6 May. Doutor Coffee shut all about 250 of their stores in seven prefectures (Tokyo, Chiba, Saitama, Kanagawa, Osaka, Hyogo and Fukuoka), which are issued emergency declaration initially, from 8 April. Starbucks also shut all about 850 of their stores in seven prefectures from 9 April. Tully's Coffee shut about 400 of their stores in seven prefectures and about 50 of their stores in six prefectures (Hokkaido, Ibarakim Ishikawa, Gifu, Aichi and Kyoto), which are designated as special alert prefectures (特定警戒都道府県, tokutei keikai todōfuken), from 16 April to 6 May and from 23 April to 6 May respectively. Ministry of Agriculture, Forestry and Fisheries asked people to drink milk more for reducing disposal of it. According to website of Joyfull (ジョイフル) family restaurant chain, 200 restaurant were close from July 2020 in Japan, affective of COVID-19 in nationwide from February 2020. A western-style restaurant chain, Kitchen Jiro (キッチンジロー) officially confirmed reports on 3 September that 13 places were closing on 30 September, due to effects of the COVID-19 pandemic in Japan, according to the restaurant's website. According to web site show for restaurant chain giant, Skylark (すかいらーく) announced in 12 November 200 place closed from November 2020 to 2021, an Izakaya (Japanese style bar) restaurant chain, Monterosa (モンテローザ), announced by web site on 15 January 61 places were closed on same day, both affective for COVID-19 pandemic on nationwide from March 2020.

=== Malaysia ===
McDonald's temporary closed their dine-in restaurants on mid-March when movement control order begun and their service were restricted to takeaways only. Despite the partially relaxation of the movement control order which is known as conditional movement control order effective 4 May which allows restaurants to accept dine-in, McDonald's refuse to provide dine-in in all their restaurants citing safety as their main priority and continue to offer takeaways until further notice.

Due to the movement control order that was enforced since mid-March, many restaurants, cafes, bakery and convenient stores in Kuala Lumpur, Selangor and Muar were impacted by the pandemic which forces many business to become defunct or dissolved, and each affected stores were placing up the banner regarding the premises is for sale or rent, although some stores has been dissolved few days earlier prior to MCO lockdown. However, not all dissolved business placed up the banner yet as their rental contract has yet to be expired. The dissolving of business was attributed to lockdown and curfews which prevents many people from having dinner and supper in restaurants during night time, which were exacerbate further by high rental fees and landlord's refusal to reduce the rental fees.

In Subang Jaya, bubble tea is one of the food industry that was worst hit by COVID-19 pandemic. According to the observation by Malay Mail, reporter discovered that in SS15 area which is well known for bubble tea hence unofficially named "Bubble Tea Street" or "Boba Street", 15 out of 20 bubble tea shops in that area were permanently closed. While the closure of these bubble tea shops were attributed to their target demographic, mainly university students and young professionals, who are unable to study and work in that area during movement control order lockdown that prevents many people from visiting their shops and was further exacerbated by the rising of rental price due to gentrification caused by booming of bubble tea shops from RM 3000 in 2014 to RM 12000 in May 2020 that causes many struggling business unable to pay rents during pandemic, however, when Malay Mail interviewed with anonymous quality control officer of an anonymous bubble tea company, he denied that pandemic impact is the real cause of decline of bubble tea shops as bubble tea shops is a food shops which food shops is a category that are allowed to operate during lockdown, but instead stating that lack of passion regarding managing their own bubble tea shops by owner is the main reason of decline of bubble tea shops. Some netizens react the closure as predictable, with one said that the decline will continues despite the diseases has contained, while others praised the closure as a hope to reduce diabetes rates among Malaysian and considering bubble tea as non-essential business.

Although some restaurants survived the pandemic impact and has reopened for dine-in, however, it was also reported that many customers were continue to prefer either queuing up for takeaways or using online food ordering system to deliver takeaways to home instead.

=== New Zealand ===
In New Zealand on 25 March 2020 butcher shops were declared non-essential businesses by the government. According to the 2017 version of the New Zealand Pandemic Plan, Retail Meat New Zealand and other organizations will coordinate with the government to maintain essential food supplies to point of sale.

=== Philippines ===
Select outlets of fast food and restaurant chains across Luzon remained operational during the Luzon enhanced community quarantine. The outlets that remained open continue to accept take out and delivery orders. Food delivery services such as GrabFood and FoodPanda temporarily halted but eventually resumed operations in Luzon during the quarantine period.

=== South Africa ===
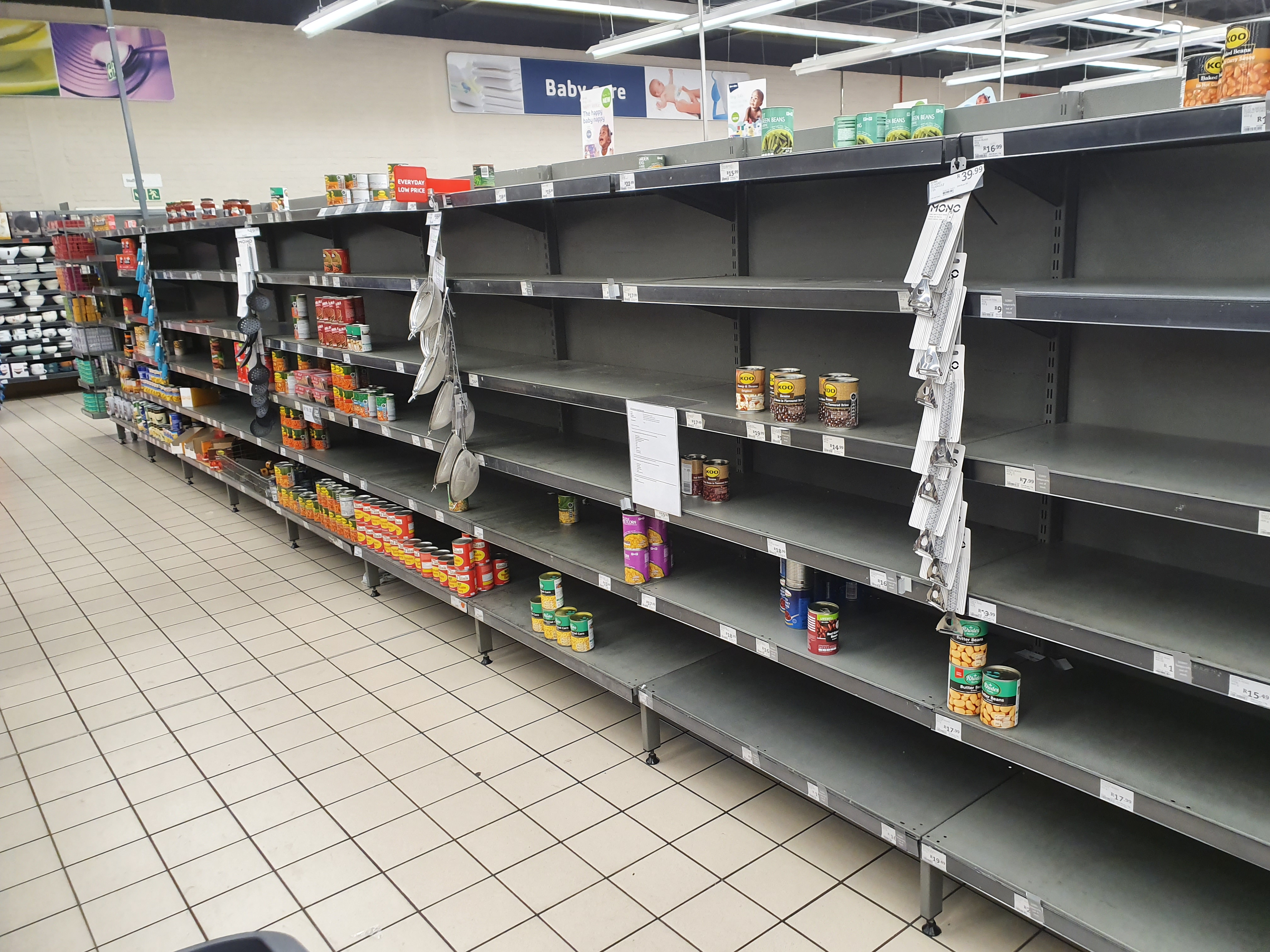
Near-empty food shelves due to panic-buying in Paarl, South Africa

In May 2021, butchery and restaurant Mzoli's was closed indefinitely. The founder's daughter Sisanda Mangele said it closed due to "a lot of things, from physical safety to the state of the economy and restrictions of the pandemic".

Zama Zwane, manager of Chaf Pozi a restaurant in Soweto, stated "We can't afford a lot of our bills and rent is also an issue. Paying salaries has become a struggle and the sector doesn't support us".

=== Sweden ===
According to Eater, in the restaurant industry in Sweden "there is a feeling of utter despair" but also high levels of camaraderie among restaurateurs, who are trying out new ideas in an attempt to survive.

=== Turkey ===
On 21 March 2020, the Ministry of the Interior announced that starting from midnight, restaurants, dining places and patisseries were to be closed to the public for dining in, and were only allowed to offer home delivery and take-away.

=== United Kingdom ===
UK Prime Minister Boris Johnson on 16 March 2020 recommended the public stay away from bars, clubs, and restaurants. The restaurant industry is the UK's third-largest employer. A relief package for workers was announced 20 March but funds would not be available until the end of April.

According to The Guardian, restaurants "scrambled to reinvent themselves" by pivoting their business models to adapt to the realities of government restrictions. Restaurants became "takeaways, bottle shops, delicatessens. Others [were] selling hampers, fresh meal-kits or offering cookery courses."

On 23 March 2020, McDonald's closed all restaurants in the UK and Ireland.

On 24 March 2020, Greggs announced that it would close all of its around 2,000 stores. This is despite having converted into a takeaway shop following the call for all restaurants and cafes to close. Nearly half of the UK food supply is imported. Multiple suppliers to restaurants switched to direct-to-consumer models.

=== United States ===
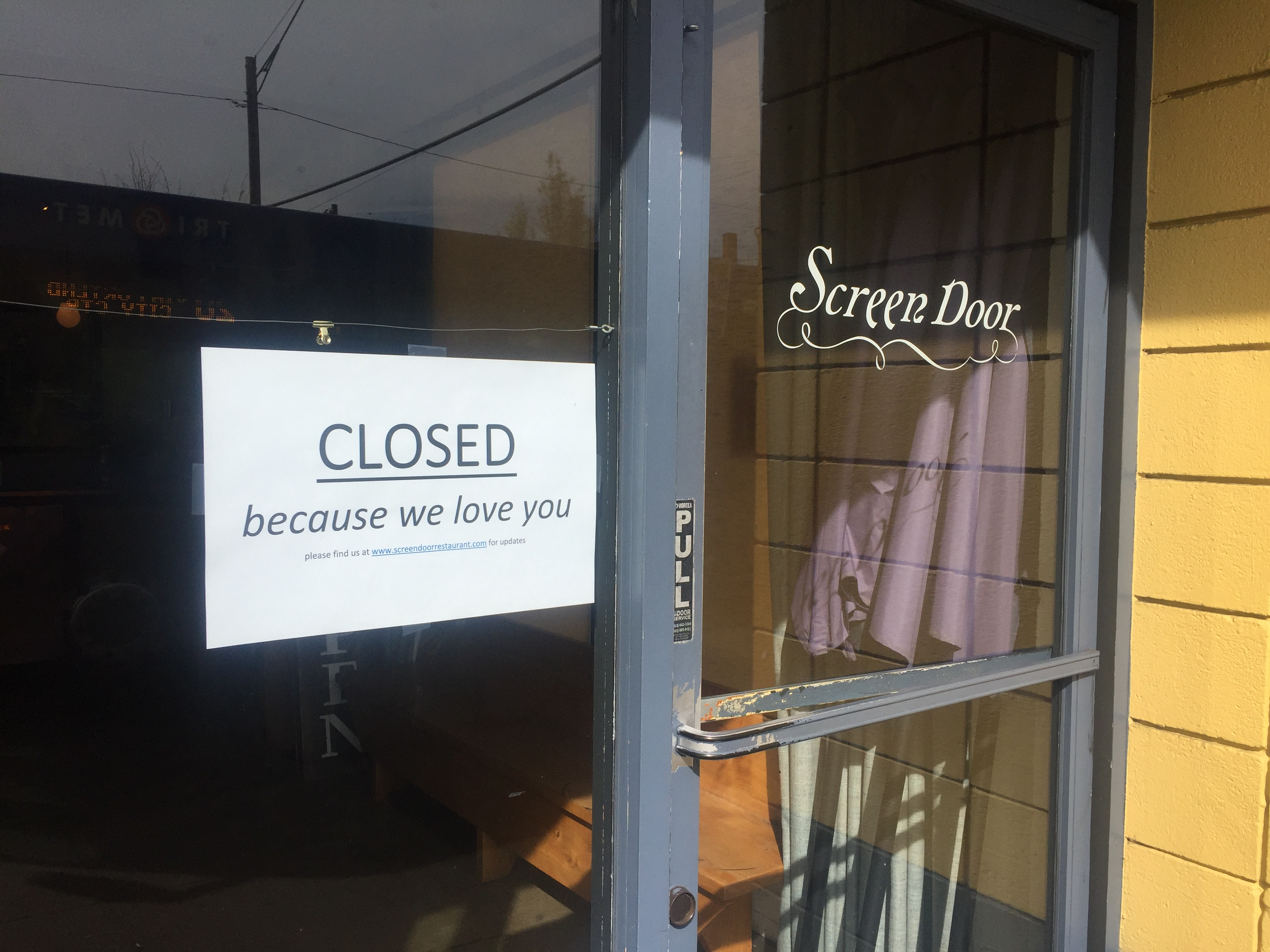
Sign noting the closure of Screen Door in Portland, Oregon, because of the pandemic

The 2020 coronavirus pandemic impacted the US food industry via government closures, resulting in layoffs of workers and loss of income for restaurants and owners. It impacted retail groceries with panic buying noted as early as 2 March in some areas.

The closures impacted the distribution for food and beverages. In early April, while grocery stores were experiencing shortages of dairy products, farmers whose main customers were in the food service supply chain were dumping their milk because of lack of demand. According to Cornell dairy industry economist Christopher Wolf, "If you have a factory that was set up to produce sour cream to sell at Mexican restaurants, you can't just decide that tomorrow you're gonna produce ice cream and send it to the grocery store." Meat processor Tyson Foods temporarily ceased operations in April because many of its workers had contracted coronavirus, and it was expected that farmers would simply slaughter many animals without having anywhere to sell them as meat.

According to NPR's Yuki Noguchi, "Just about every restaurant nationwide has been hit hard at once, making this disaster unique." Industry experts warned that many small businesses would not be able to recover from closures without help from the government. Impact on the greater economy was as of 17 March expected to be large as Americans have in recent years spent more at restaurants than at grocery stores. Lester Jones, chief economist of the National Beer Wholesalers Association, said "This is a very significant and traumatic event for the restaurants, bars, taverns and the industry in general." Chris Swonger, CED of the Distilled Spirits Council of the United States, said "The impact on our industry is going to be really, really difficult. It's going to be a real challenge economically for not only the distillers of the United States, but certainly small businesses, restaurants, and bars." Sean Kennedy of the National Restaurant Association on 19 March called the closures a "perfect storm" for the industry, saying the three primary challenges for restaurateurs are short-term access to cash, medium and long-term access to credit, and tax relief when the closures are ended. An investor in two New York City restaurants told the New York Post:

This situation is apocalyptic for the restaurant business. How sad would the city be if the only places that survived were chains? It makes me depressed to even think about it.

— Mark Amadei

The New York Times on 20 March reported that industry analysts were predicting that two-thirds of restaurants would not survive, and as many as 75% of independents. On 26 March 11 percent of restaurants anticipated permanently closing within the next 30 days.

The US restaurant industry was projected at $899 billion in sales for 2020 by the National Restaurant Association, the main trade association for the industry in the United States. An estimated 99% of companies in the industry are family-owned small businesses with fewer than 50 employees. The industry as a whole as of February 2020 employed more than 15 million people, representing 10% of the workforce directly. It is the nation's second largest private employer and the third largest employer overall. It indirectly employed close to another 10% when dependent businesses such as food producers, trucking, and delivery services were factored in, according to Ohio restaurateur Britney Ruby Miller. In Delaware and Massachusetts, one in ten workers is employed in the restaurant industry. In North Carolina, 11% of workers are employed by the industry. In Texas, 12% of workers were employed by the industry as of 2016.

Forbes on 19 March estimated the job losses in the restaurant industry to be in the millions. The National Restaurant Association estimated probable job losses to be five to seven million.

Industry experts on 18 March forecasted $225 billion in direct losses and a full economic impact of $675 billion because of additional revenues generated elsewhere in the economy when customers patronize restaurants.

In July, Dunkin' Donuts announced the permanent closure of 800 stores as pandemic related closures impacted the chain's business revenues. California Pizza Kitchen filed for bankruptcy. NPC International, CEC Entertainment, Le Pain Quotidien have also filed for bankruptcy.

==== Timeline ====
In a 28 February story about how restaurants could prepare for the possibility of a pandemic, Restaurant Business quoted Roslyn Stone, COO of a firm that provides crisis response for restaurants, who said "The prospect of a global pandemic has already put a spotlight on restaurants and the tendency for employees to come in sick. Though more chains have started giving employees sick time as the supply of labor has tightened, it's increasingly important for companies to change their culture to ensure employees aren't working while sick."

A 3 March story in Nation's Restaurant News characterized the industry as being braced for impact from the virus.

On Sunday, 15 March, Ohio Governor Mike DeWine and Ohio Health Department director Amy Acton ordered the closure of all bars and restaurants to help slow the spread of the virus, saying the government "encouraged restaurants to offer carryout or delivery service, but they would not be allowed to have people congregating in the businesses." DeWine said he'd made the decision "after being contacted by citizens around the state sharing photos and stories of crowded bars Saturday night, despite warnings of social distancing and the governor's edict limiting crowds to no larger than 100 people." The city of Los Angeles closed all restaurants and bars later that evening and New York City announced all restaurants and bars would close by the following Tuesday, both cities also allowing exceptions for takeout and delivery.

The next day, Illinois, New Jersey, New York state, Connecticut, Kentucky, Pennsylvania, Maryland and Washington DC followed suit. On 18 March, the National Restaurant Association asked the federal government to provide relief to restaurants and restaurant workers. By 21 March, at least 25 states had closed restaurants and bars. By 22 March, the number had risen to 38. In other states, major cities had closed bars and restaurants to sit-down diners and limited to takeout orders and delivery.

==== Industry fallout and reactions ====
The partial rather than full closings of restaurants meant that the closings failed to trigger business interruption insurance for many restaurants; other policies had clauses excluding coverage in the case of epidemics, action by civil authority, or requiring restaurants to have physical damage to property. Many employees were laid off, and more employees lacked sick leave in the sector compared to similar sectors. The New York Times characterized the closures as affecting "all strata of the industry, from the owners and their celebrity chefs to the waiters and waitresses, bar-backs and busboys, who effectively are facing layoffs and may be unable to pay their rent."

The virus has spread to hundreds of meat processing plants in the U.S., forcing some facilities to close, and causing tens of thousands of infections and dozens of deaths among meat processing workers. Smithfield Foods CEO Kenneth Sullivan said this created risks to the meat supply chain; the company closed at least three plants because of workers with the virus.

Directory and review site Yelp in July announced that 60% of US restaurants that closed down completely during the pandemic had marked those closures as permanent for a total of nearly 16,000 restaurants by 24 July.

==== Government response ====
Multiple state and local governments offered relief packages for workers and restaurants. US President Trump met via phone on 19 March with leaders of chain restaurant companies, but no independent franchises were included. Participants included Domino's Pizza, McDonald's, Wendy's, Yum Brands and Darden Restaurants and representatives from the International Franchise Association and the National Retail Federation.

In early May legislation was proposed in Congress to allow Americans to use SNAP benefits at restaurants. Currently, food assistance benefits can only be used at restaurants if the state participates in the "Restaurant Meals Program". The proposed SNAP CARRY Act includes provisions to expand access to the restaurant program during emergencies like the pandemic.

On a wider scope, in 2021 the Quality Franchise Association published a report investigating the impacts of the pandemic on the UK franchising sector, with a survey on both franchisor and franchisee angles of business from a variety of sectors.

== Shopping and spread of the coronavirus ==
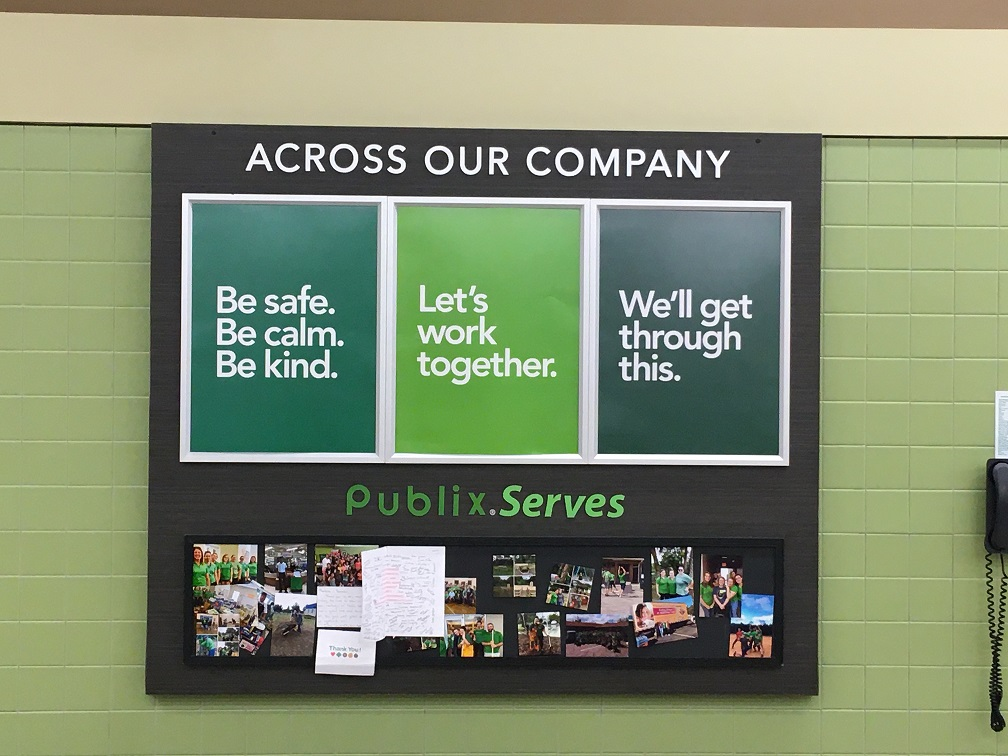
Publix announcement in Florida on 14 May 2020

Individuals who have continued to shop during the 2019–20 coronavirus pandemic are at an increased risk of contracting COVID-19. Amidst the pandemic, grocery stores and pharmacies continue to remain open and attract crowds of shoppers, thus creating the potential to further spread contagion. Some stores and pharmacies have set restrictions on shoppers to encourage social distancing such as a limit on capacity, required masks for customers and employees, taking temperatures before entrance or not allowing children under 16 inside the buildings.

== Sources ==
This article incorporates text from a free content work. Licensed under CC BY-SA 3.0 IGO (license statement/permission). Text taken from Food Safety in the time of COVID-19, FAO.
