= Proanthocyanidin B3 =

Proanthocyanidin B3 may refer to:

- Procyanidin B3, a catechin dimer.
- Prodelphinidin B3, a gallocatechin-catechin dimer.
