= Toast water =

Water and toast drink

A glass of toast water

Toast water was a drink served to the weak and sickly in Britain, Australia, and North America during the 19th and 20th centuries. It was made by pouring boiling water over toasted bread, allowing the liquid to cool, and then straining and serving the drink cold. Some recipes suggested adding ingredients such as jelly, wine, or cream.

Toast water was one of several drinks given to the sick and convalescent. Its primary purpose was maintaining fluids, although some additions were understood to provide nutrients, stimulate appetite, and provide warmth. The drink became increasingly rare during the 20th century. Several explanations have been put forward for this decline, including the uptake of antibiotics, a decrease in people experiencing prolonged illness, and the difficulty in commercialising the drink.

== History ==
A recipe published in a late 19th-century cookbook

Until the development of the modern medical profession in the late 18th and early 19th centuries, the task of administering medical care in Britain typically fell to women in the home, who were supported by cookbooks providing advice and purported cures. As the medical profession became more established and respected, cures were phased out of these cookbooks. In their place, specialty cookbooks were released and sections added to general cookbooks instructing in "invalid cookery". Rather than cures, these books and sections contained foods that were considered appropriate for the weak and ill. For the most frail and sickly patients, invalid cookery meant a liquid diet, with a primary goal of maintaining fluids. Toast water was among the most common drinks recommended for these purposes, alongside beef tea (today prepared with meat extracts such as Oxo), and barley water.

Toast water emerged as a distinct drink in Britain in the late-18th century. Burnt toast soaked in water had previously been served in Britain in the 1700s, though it was drunk as a coffee substitute rather than its own drink. Toast water became common in the United States in the mid-19th century, as toast increasingly featured in American diets in forms such as croutons and stuffing, dishes like milk toast and cream toast, and alongside soups and omelets. Outside of Britain and the US, toast water was also prepared in the invalid cookery of the Canada and Australia.

Toast water became increasingly obscure during the 20th century, and it is not included in modern cookbooks. Roger Owen in the Oxford Companion to Food attributes this to liquid diets becoming rare as fewer people suffered prolonged, minor illnesses, and the widespread uptake of antibiotics. The food writer Helen Pollard suggests a different possibility: a drink made of bread, an ingredient available in almost all households, could not be commercialised in the same way as barley water or beef tea, and therefore lacked the market forces that kept the others around.

== Preparation ==
Toast water jug, c. 1850, Scotland

Preparation began by toasting bread until dark but, in most advice, not burnt. Boiling water was then poured over the toast, and the mixture allowed to sit until cool. The liquid was then strained out, and the beverage served cold. By the 1830s, toast water could be prepared in a toast water jug, a specially designed vessel with a lid and a perforated spout that would filter out the soaked toast. One piece made in the 1840s is attributed to Mintons.

Some recipes suggest additions, including redcurrant jelly, lemon, dried orange rind, or cream and sugar. Commenting on this last combination, Pollard called it a "distinct improvement". In one cookbook, published in the US in 1864, nutmeg and white wine were included. Drinkers would "relish" the drink, said the book's author, Mrs S. G. Knight—which was important for a person who may otherwise have little appetite. Alcohol was common in the invalid cookery of the US in the 1860s. Besides making the drink more appealing, it was understood to have warming and medicinal properties. In the context of a growing temperance movement, an alcoholic toast water may have also been a pretext for drinking in a socially acceptable manner.

How far the bread should be toasted could elicit strong feelings. Writing in 1849, the French chef Alexis Soyer defended unburned toast:

the idea that bread must be burnt black to make toast and water is quite a popular delusion, for nothing nourishing could come from it: if your house was burnt to ashes, it would be valueless; and the same with burnt bread, which merely makes the water black, but the nutriment of the bread, intended to relieve the chest, has evaporated in smoke by being burnt.

By contrast, Dr and Mrs Delamere argued in their 1878 book Wholesome Fare that a cook should "allow some portion of [the bread] to catch fire and, blaze, blow out the flame immediately". To them, the formation of charcoal was the point: they believed it could purify the water, and if one wanted to offer a beverage for its nutritional value, they should be serving oxtail soup.

== See also ==
- Beer from bread
- Kvass

== Sources ==
=== Primary ===
- Soyer, Alexis (1849). The Modern Housewife or Ménagère. London: Simpkin, Marshall & Co.
- Delamere, Edmund S.; Delamere, Ellen J. (1878). Wholesome Fare: A Sanitary Cookbook. London: Crosby Lockwood and Co.
- Knight, S. G. (1864). Tit-bits; or, How to Prepare a Nice Dish at a Moderate Expense. Boston: Crosby and Nichols.

=== Secondary ===
- Driver, Elizabeth (2008). Culinary Landmarks: A Bibliography of Canadian Cookbooks, 1825-1949. Toronto, Ontario & Buffalo: University of Toronto Press. ISBN 978-0-8020-4790-8.
- Mason, Laura (2014). "Toast". In Davidson, Alan; Jaine, Tom (eds.). The Oxford Companion to Food (3rd ed.). Oxford University Press. ISBN 978-0-19-967733-7.
- Neale, Gillian (2005). Miller's Encyclopedia of British Transfer-printed Pottery Patterns, 1790-1930. London: Miller's. pp. 98, 156. ISBN 1-84533-003-X.
- Owen, Roger (2014). "Toast water". In Davidson, Alan; Jaine, Tom (eds.). The Oxford Companion to Food (3rd ed.). Oxford University Press. ISBN 978-0-19-967733-7.
- Pollard, Helen M (1993). "A Liquid Diet". In Wilson, C Anne (ed.). Liquid Nourishment: Potable Foods and Stimulating Drinks. Edinburgh: Edinburgh University Press. ISBN 0-7486-0424-3.
- Smith, Andrew F (2013). Food and Drink in American History. Santa Barbara, California: ABC-CLIO. ISBN 978-1-61069-233-5.
- Symons, Michael (1982). One Continuous Picnic. Adelaide, South Australia: Duck Press. ISBN 0-9593047-0-3.
- Veit, Helen Zoe, ed. (2014). Food in the Civil War Era: The North. American Food in History. East Lansing: Michigan State University Press. ISBN 978-1-61186-122-8.
