= Prodelphinidin B9 =

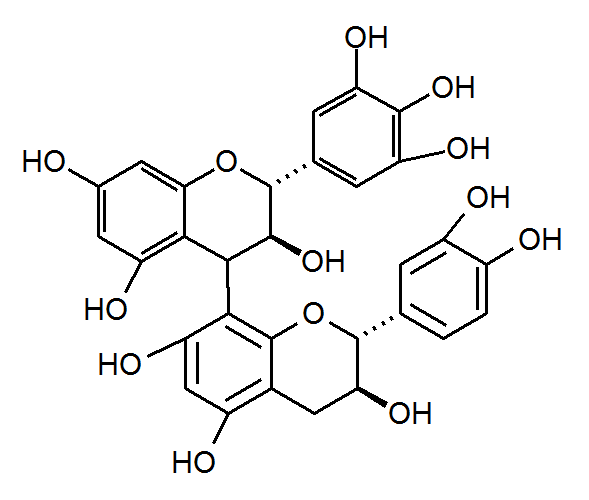

Names
- Other names Epigallocatechin-(4α→8)-catechin

Identifiers
CAS Number	86631-36-9
3D model (JSmol)	Interactive image
ChemSpider	107446034
PubChem CID	5089687
- InChI: InChI=1S/C30H26O14/c31-11-5-14(33)22-21(6-11)43-29(10-3-18(37)26(41)19(38)4-10)27(42)24(22)23-15(34)8-13(32)12-7-20(39)28(44-30(12)23)9-1-16(35)25(40)17(36)2-9/h1-6,8,20,24,27-29,31-42H,7H2 Key: RTEDIEITOBJPNI-WKOHRUSMSA-N
- SMILES: c1c(cc(c(c1O)O)O)[C@@H]2[C@@H](Cc3c(cc(c(c3O2)[C@@H]4c5c(cc(cc5O[C@@H]([C@@H]4O)c6cc(c(c(c6)O)O)O)O)O)O)O)O

Properties
Chemical formula	C_{30}H_{26}O_{13}
Molar mass	594.525 g·mol^{−1}
- Except where otherwise noted, data are given for materials in their standard state (at 25 °C [77 °F], 100 kPa). Infobox references

Prodelphinidin B9 is a prodelphinidin dimer found in beer.
