= Beer from bread =

Beer brewed using bread

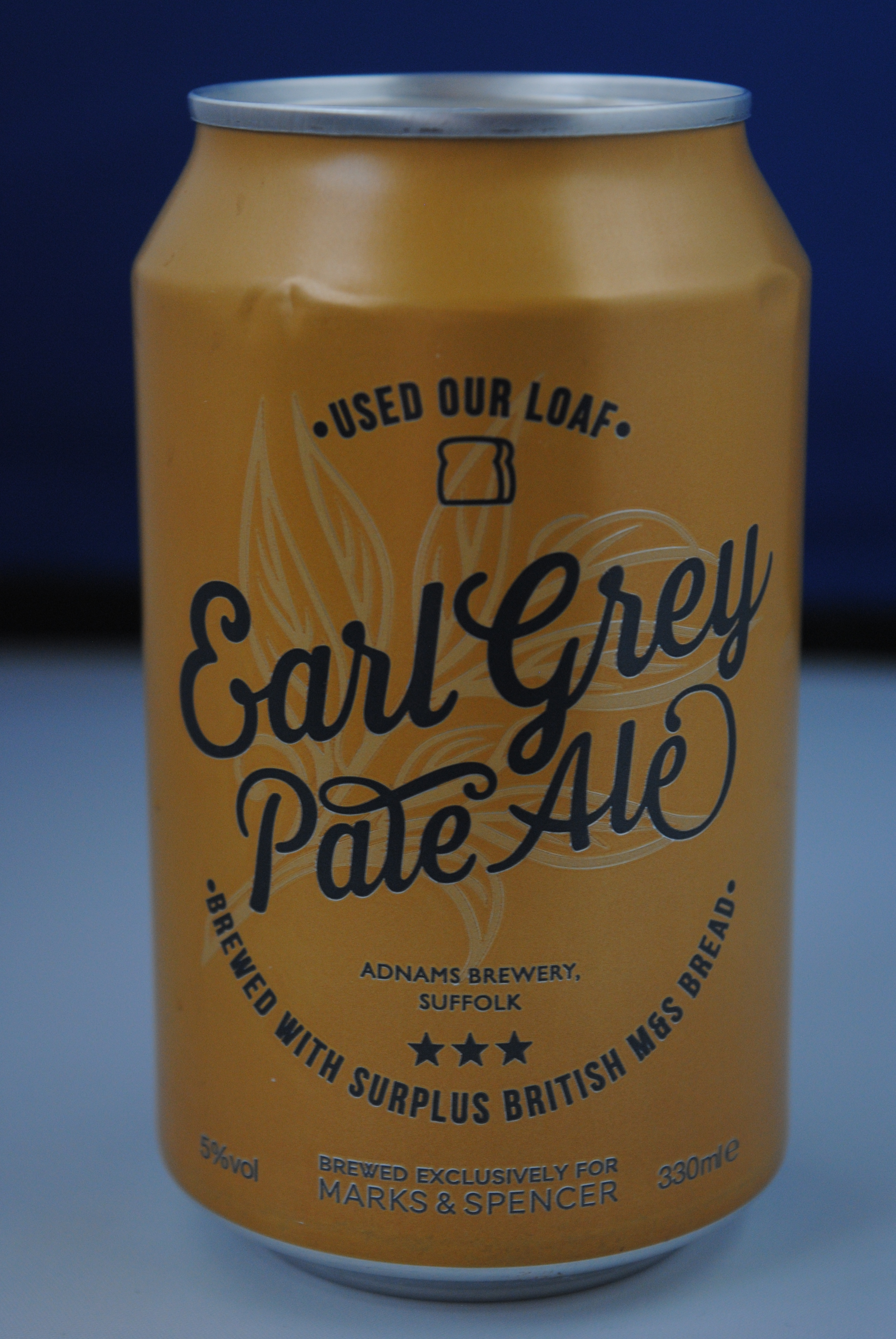
A 330ml can of Marks & Spencer 'Earl Grey Pale Ale' (5% ABV), made using bread, flavoured with Earl Grey tea, brewed by Adnams

Although most beer is brewed using cereal grains—most commonly malted barley—as a source of starch sugars, it can also be made from bread.

Beers made from bread include Sahti in Finland, Kvass in Russia and Ukraine, and Bouza in Egypt and Sudan.

In several countries, 'Toast Ale' is made—in a range of styles—from surplus bread from the catering trade, as part of a campaign to reduce food waste. The recipe is open source. Inspired by this, Adnams brewed a range of three beers exclusively for Marks & Spencer in 2018, using leftover bread from the store's sandwich suppliers. All the waste bread was then used as animal feed.

== See also ==
- Toast water
