= Beer =

Alcoholic drink made from fermented cereal grains

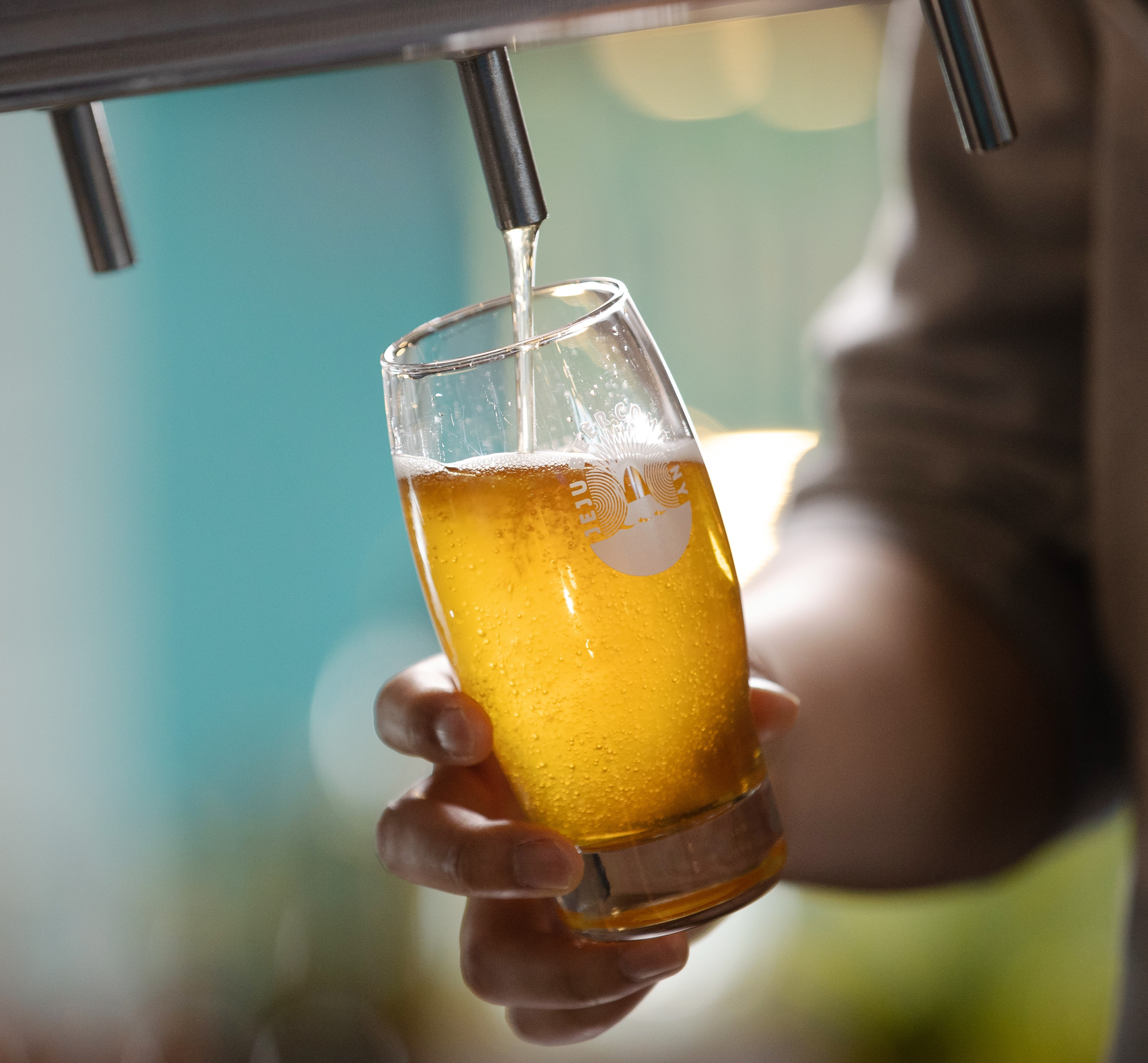
Pouring a beer in Korea

Beer is an alcoholic beverage produced by the brewing and fermentation of starches from cereal grain—most commonly malted barley, although wheat, maize, rice, and oats are also used. The grain is mashed to convert starch in the grain to sugars, which dissolve in water to form wort. Fermentation of the wort by yeast produces ethanol and carbonation in the beer. Beer is one of the oldest and most widely consumed alcoholic drinks in the world, and one of the most popular of all drinks. Most modern beer is brewed with hops, which add bitterness and other flavours and act as a natural preservative and stabilizer. Other flavouring agents, such as gruit, herbs, or fruits, may be included or used instead of hops. In commercial brewing, natural carbonation is often replaced with forced carbonation.

Beer is distributed in bottles and cans, and is commonly available on draught in pubs and bars. The brewing industry is a global business, consisting of several dominant multinational corporations and many thousands of smaller producers ranging from brewpubs to regional breweries. The strength of modern beer is usually around 4% to 6% alcohol by volume (ABV).

Some of the earliest writings mention the production and distribution of beer: the Code of Hammurabi (1750 BC) included laws regulating it, while "The Hymn to Ninkasi", a prayer to the Mesopotamian goddess of beer, contains a recipe for it. Beer forms part of the culture of many nations and is associated with social traditions such as beer festivals, as well as activities like pub games. Beer can cause health issues if consumed often or in excess; alcohol is an IARC group 1 carcinogen.

== Etymology ==
Old English: Beore 'beer'

In early forms of English and in the Scandinavian languages, the usual word for beer was the word whose Modern English form is ale. The modern word beer comes into present-day English from Old English bēor, itself from Proto-Germanic; it is found throughout the West Germanic and North Germanic dialects (modern Dutch and German bier, Old Norse bjórr). The earlier etymology of the word is debated: the three main theories are that the word originates in Proto-Germanic *beuzą (putatively from Proto-Indo-European *bʰeusóm), meaning "brewer's yeast, beer dregs"; that it is related to the word barley; or that it was somehow borrowed from Latin bibere "to drink".

Christine Fell, in Leeds Studies in English (1975), suggests that the Old English/Norse word bēor did not originally denote ale or beer, but a strong, sweet drink rather like mead or cider. Whatever the case, the meaning of bēor expanded to cover the meaning of 'ale'. When hopped ale from Europe was imported into Britain in the late Middle Ages, it was described as "beer" to differentiate it from the British unhopped ale, later acquiring a broader meaning.

== History ==
=== Prehistory ===
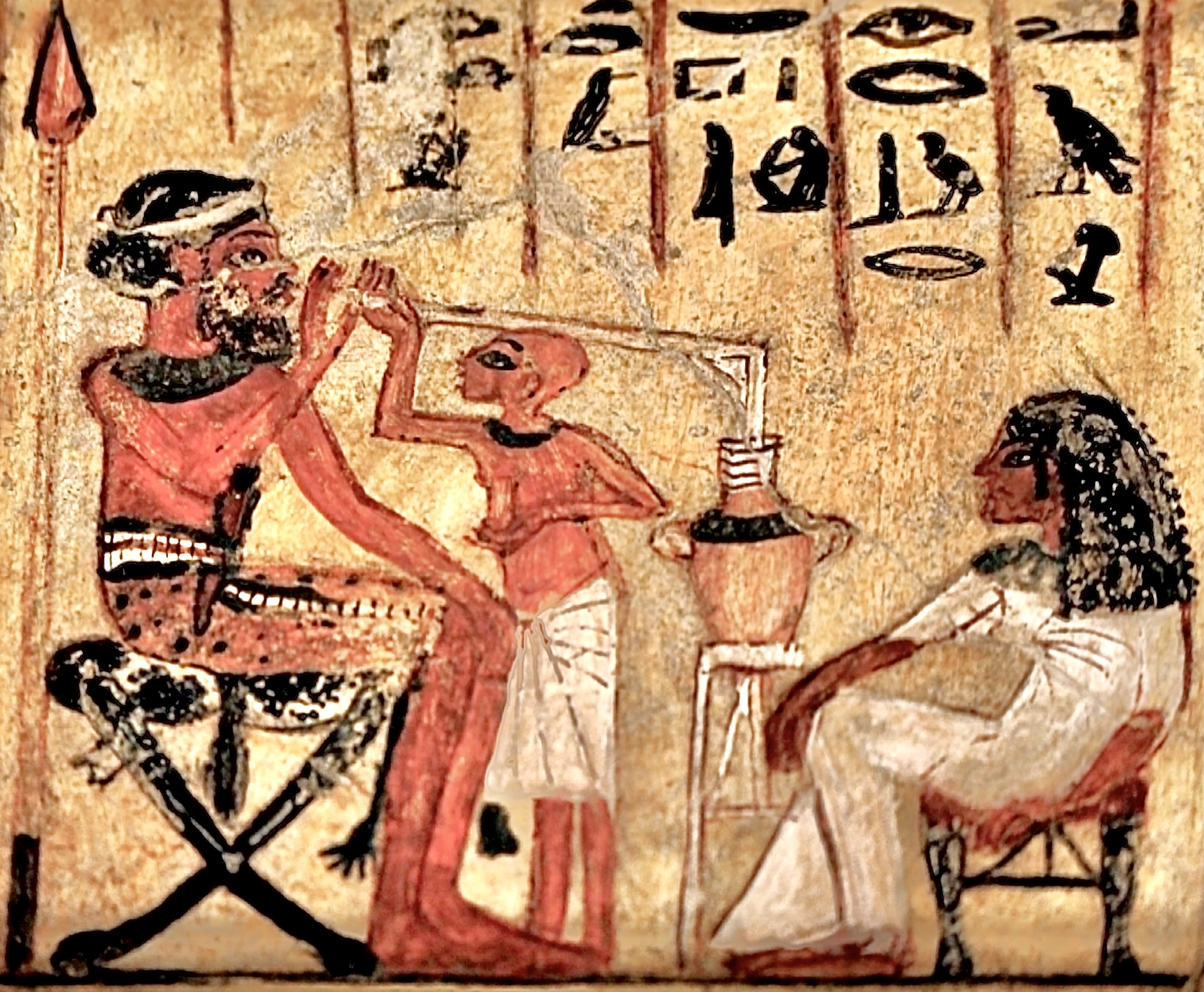
Ancient Egyptian painting, 18th dynasty, reign of Akhenaten, c. 1300 BC, showing Syrian mercenary drinking beer through a straw. Egyptian Museum of Berlin

Beer is one of the world's oldest prepared alcoholic drinks. The earliest archaeological evidence of fermentation consists of 13,000 year-old residues of a beer with the consistency of gruel, used by the semi-nomadic Natufians for ritual feasting, at the Raqefet Cave in the Carmel Mountains near Haifa in northern Israel. There is evidence that beer was produced at Göbekli Tepe during the Pre-Pottery Neolithic (around 8500 BC to 5500 BC). The earliest clear chemical evidence of beer produced from barley dates to about 3500–3100 BC, from the site of Godin Tepe in the Zagros Mountains of western Iran.

=== Early civilisations ===
Some of the earliest writings mention the production and distribution of beer: the c. 1750 BC Babylonian Code of Hammurabi included laws regulating it, while "The Hymn to Ninkasi", a c. 1800 BC prayer to the Mesopotamian goddess of beer, a recipe for it.

Beer is recorded in the written history of ancient Egypt, and archaeologists speculate that beer was instrumental in the formation of civilisations. The Sumerians drank a variety of beers, eight types from barley, 12 types from wheat and 3 from a mixture of grains. The Sumerian goddess Ninkasi was believed to oversee the brewing process, and the production and distribution of beer was attributed there to women. Approximately 5000 years ago, workers in the city of Uruk (modern day Iraq) were paid by their employers with volumes of beer. During the building of the Egyptian pyramids, each worker got a daily ration of four to five litres of beer, which served as both nutrition and refreshment and was crucial to the pyramids' construction.

Some of the earliest Sumerian writings contain references to beer; examples include a prayer to the goddess Ninkasi, known as "The Hymn to Ninkasi", which served as both a prayer and a method of remembering the recipe for beer in a culture with few literate people, and the ancient advice ("Fill your belly. Day and night make merry") to Gilgamesh, recorded in the Epic of Gilgamesh by the alewife Siduri, may, at least in part, have referred to the consumption of beer. The Ebla tablets, discovered in 1974 in Ebla, Syria, show that beer was produced in the city in 2500 BC. A fermented drink using rice and fruit was made in China around 7000 BC. Unlike sake, mould was not used to saccharify the rice (amylolytic fermentation); the rice was probably prepared for fermentation by chewing or malting. During the Vedic period in Ancient India, there are records of the consumption of the beer-like sura. 4th century BCE Greek philosopher Xenophon noted that during his travels, "barley wine" was being produced in Armenia and drunk through straws.

=== Medieval ===
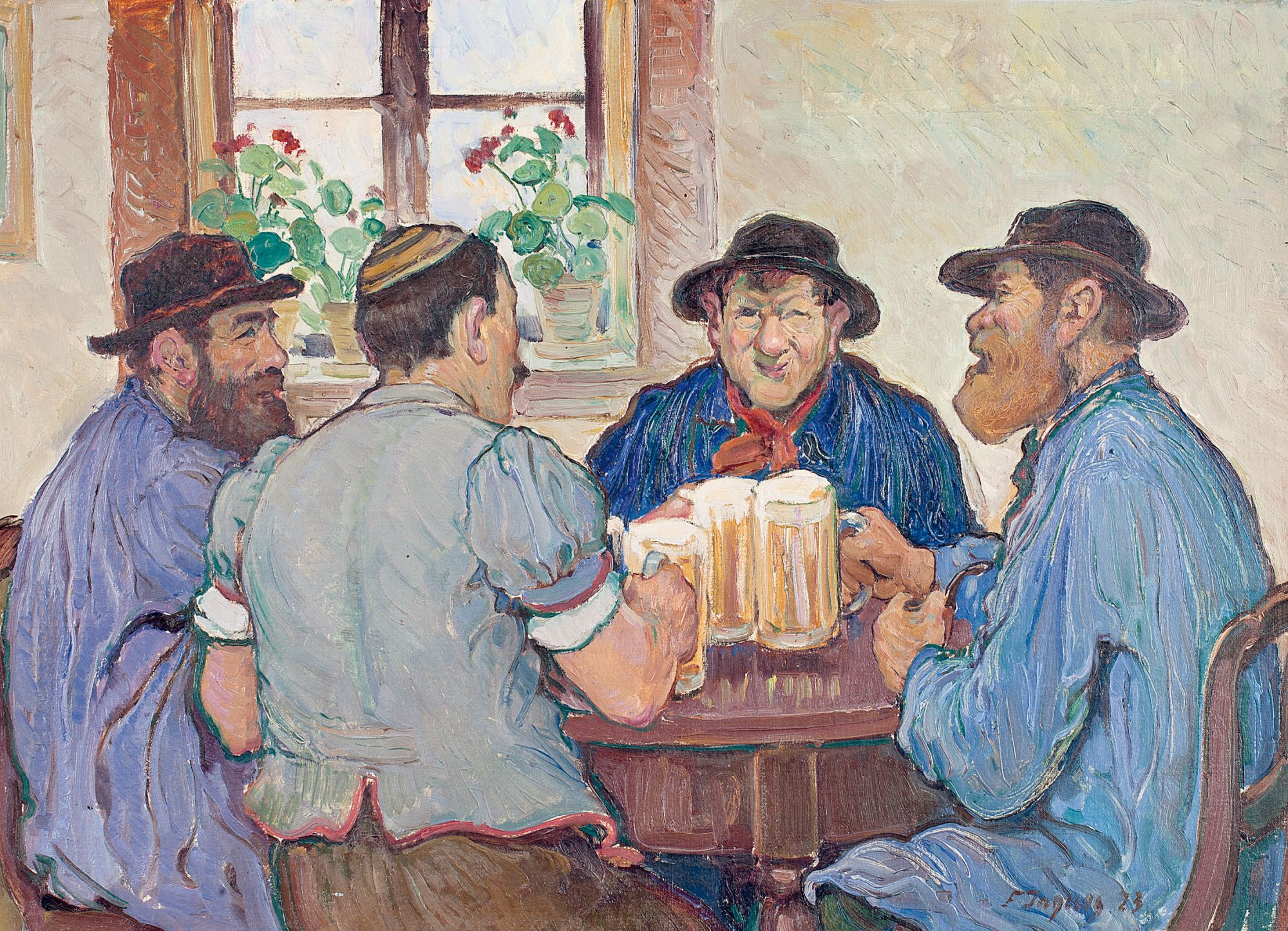
François Jaques: Peasants enjoying beer at pub in Fribourg (Switzerland, 1923)

Beer was spread through Europe by Germanic and Celtic tribes as far back as 3000 BC, and it was mainly brewed on a domestic scale. The product that the early Europeans drank might not be recognised as beer by most people today. Alongside the basic starch source, the early European beers may have contained fruits, honey, numerous types of plants, spices, and other substances such as narcotic herbs. This mixture was called gruit, where if some were improperly heated could cause hallucinations. The mixture of gruit was different from every brewer. What they did not contain was hops, as that was a later addition, first mentioned in Europe around 822 by a Carolingian Abbot and again in the twelfth century by abbess Hildegard of Bingen.

In 1516, William IV, Duke of Bavaria adopted the Reinheitsgebot (purity law), perhaps the oldest food-quality regulation still in use in the 21st century, according to which the only allowed ingredients of beer are water, hops, and barley-malt. Beer produced before the Industrial Revolution was made and sold on a domestic scale, although by the 7th century AD, beer was also being produced and sold by European monasteries. During the Industrial Revolution, the production of beer moved from artisanal to industrial manufacture, while domestic production ceased to be significant by the end of the 19th century.

=== Modern ===
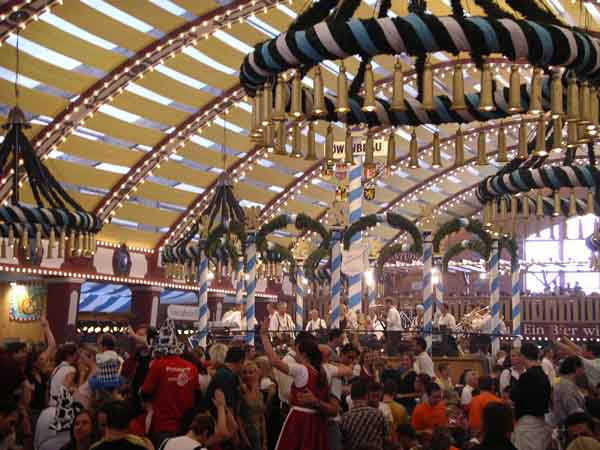
A tent at Munich's Oktoberfest in Germany. The event is known as the world's largest beer festival.

In 1912, brown bottles began to be used by the Joseph Schlitz Brewing Company of Milwaukee, Wisconsin, in the United States. This innovation has since been accepted worldwide as it prevents light rays from degrading the quality and stability of beer. The brewing industry is a global business, consisting of several dominant multinational companies and many thousands of smaller producers, ranging from brewpubs to regional breweries. As of 2006, more than 133 billion litres (35 billion US gallons) of beer are sold per year, producing global revenues of US$294.5 billion. In 2010, China's beer consumption hit 45 billion litres (12 billion US gallons), or nearly twice that of the United States, but only 5 per cent sold were premium beers, compared with 50 per cent in France and Germany. Beer is the most widely consumed of all alcoholic drinks; it is considered to be a social lubricant. A widely publicised study in 2018 suggested that sudden decreases in barley production due to extreme drought and heat could in the future cause substantial volatility in the availability and price of beer.

== Brewing ==
=== Process ===
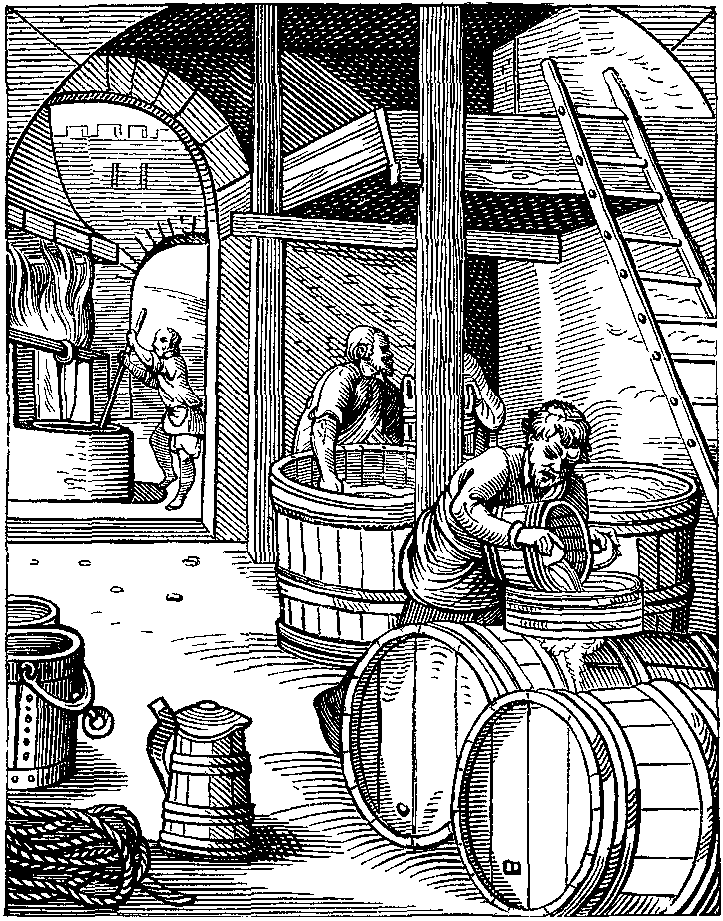
A 16th-century brewery

The process of making beer is brewing. It converts the grain into a sugary liquid called wort and then ferments this into beer using yeast. The first step, mixing malted barley with hot water in a mash tun, is "mashing". The starches are converted to sugars, and the sweet wort is drained off. The grains are washed to extract as much fermentable liquid from the grains as possible. The sweet wort is put into a kettle, or "copper", and boiled. Hops are added as a source of bitterness, flavour, and aroma. The longer the hops are boiled, the more bitterness they contribute, but the less hop flavour and aroma remain. The wort is cooled and the yeast is added. The wort is then fermented, often for a week or longer. The yeast settles, leaving the beer clear. During fermentation, most of the carbon dioxide is allowed to escape through a trap. The carbonation is often increased either by transferring the beer to a pressure vessel and introducing pressurised carbon dioxide or by transferring it before the fermentation is finished so that carbon dioxide pressure builds up inside the container.

=== Ingredients ===
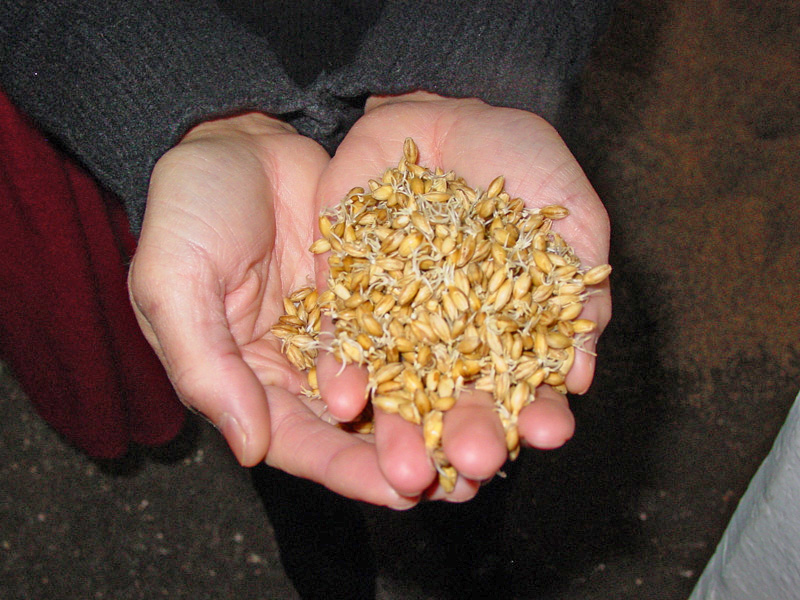
Malted barley before roasting

The basic ingredients of beer are water; a starch source, usually malted barley; a brewer's yeast to produce the fermentation; and a flavouring such as hops. A mixture of starch sources may be used, with a secondary carbohydrate source, such as maize (corn), rice, wheat, or sugar, often termed an adjunct, especially when used alongside malted barley. Less widely used starch sources include millet, sorghum, and cassava root in Africa; potato in Brazil; and agave in Mexico.

Water is the main ingredient, accounting for 93% of beer's weight. The level of dissolved bicarbonate influences beer's finished taste. Due to the mineral properties of each region's water, specific areas were originally the sole producers of certain types of beer, each identifiable by regional characteristics. Dublin's hard water is well-suited to making stout, such as Guinness, while the Plzeň Region's soft water is ideal for brewing Pilsner, such as Pilsner Urquell. The waters of Burton in England contain gypsum, which benefits making pale ale to such a degree that brewers of pale ale add gypsum in a process known as Burtonisation.

The starch source provides the fermentable material and determines the strength and flavour of the beer. The most common starch source used in beer is malted grain. Grain is malted by soaking it in water, allowing it to begin germination, and then drying the partially germinated grain in a kiln. Malting produces enzymes that convert starches into fermentable sugars. Different roasting times and temperatures produce different colours of malt from the same grain. Darker malts produce darker beers. Nearly all beers use barley malt for most of the starch, as its fibrous hull remains attached to the grain during threshing. After malting, barley is milled, which finally removes the hull, breaking it into large pieces. These pieces remain with the grain during the mash and act as a filter bed during lautering, when sweet wort is separated from insoluble grain material. Other grains, including wheat, rice, oats, and rye, and less frequently, corn and sorghum may be used. Some brewers have produced gluten-free beer, made with sorghum, for those who cannot consume gluten-containing grains like wheat, barley, and rye.

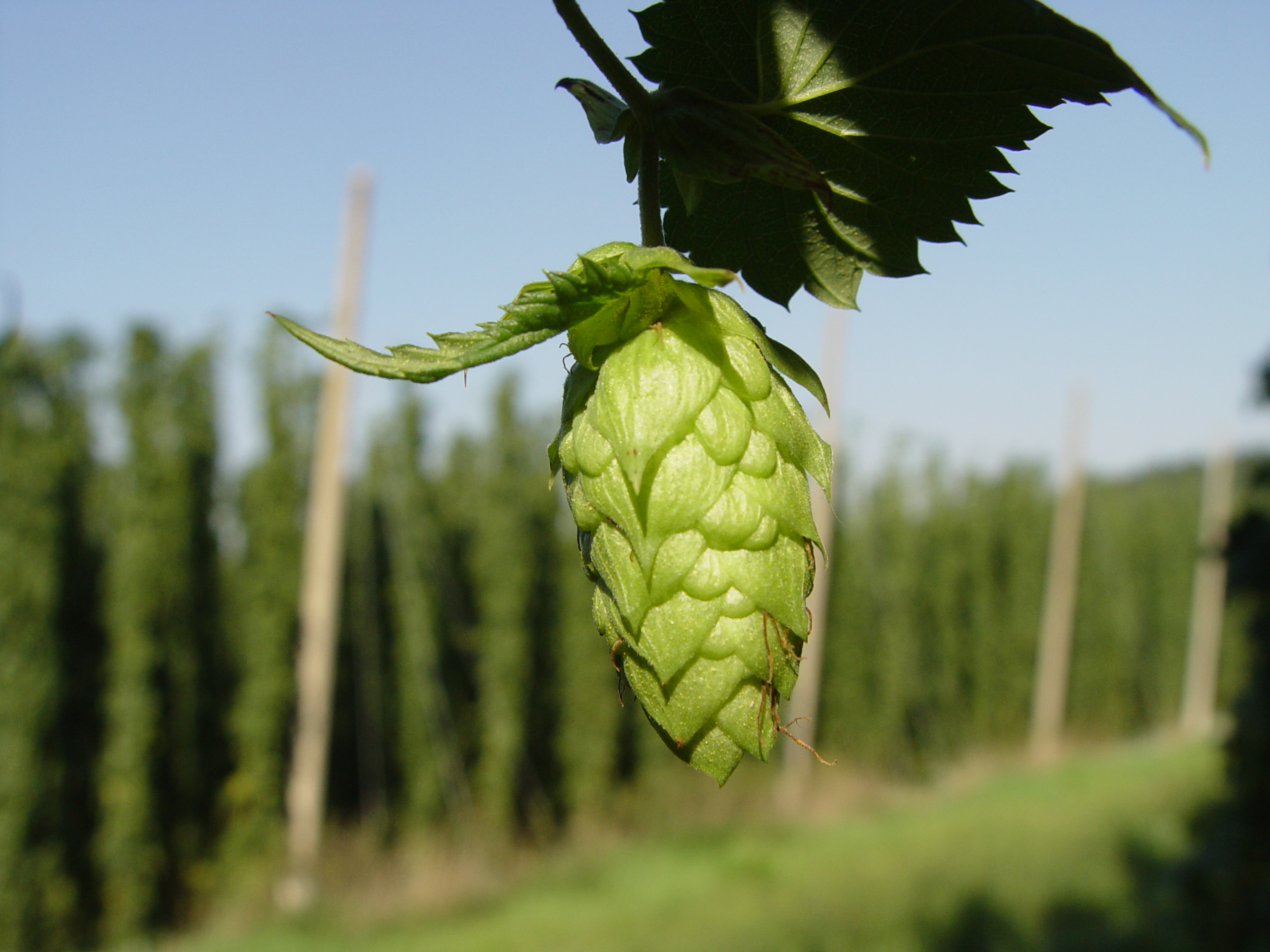
Hop cone in a Hallertau, Germany, hop yard

Flavouring beer is the sole commercial use of hops. The flower of the hop vine acts as a flavouring and preservative agent in nearly all beer made today. The flowers themselves are often called "hops". The first historical mention of the use of hops in beer dates from 822 AD in monastery rules written by Adalard of Corbie, though widespread cultivation of hops for use in beer began in the thirteenth century. Before then, beer was flavoured with other plants such as grains of paradise or 'alehoof'. Combinations of aromatic herbs, berries, and even wormwood were combined into a flavouring mixture known as gruit. Some beers today, such as Fraoch' by the Scottish Heather Ales company use plants other than hops for flavouring. and Cervoise Lancelot by the French Brasserie-Lancelot company,

Hops contribute a bitterness that balances the sweetness of the malt; the bitterness of beers is measured on the International Bitterness Units scale. Hops further contribute floral, citrus, and herbal aromas and flavours. They have an antibiotic effect that favours the activity of brewer's yeast over less desirable microorganisms, and aids in "head retention", the length of time that a foamy head created by carbonation will last. The acidity of hops is a preservative.

Yeast is the microorganism responsible for fermenting beer. It metabolises the sugars, producing ethanol and carbon dioxide, and thereby turns wort into beer. In addition, yeast influences the character and flavour. The dominant types of beer yeast are top-fermenting Saccharomyces cerevisiae and bottom-fermenting Saccharomyces pastorianus. Brettanomyces ferments lambics, and Torulaspora delbrueckii ferments Bavarian weissbier. Before the role of yeast in fermentation was understood, fermentation involved wild or airborne yeasts. A few styles, such as lambics, rely on this method today, but most modern fermentation adds pure yeast cultures.

Some brewers add clarifying agents or finings to beer, which typically precipitate (collect as a solid) out along with protein solids, and are found only in trace amounts in the finished product. This process makes the beer appear bright and clean, rather than the cloudy appearance of ethnic and older styles such as wheat beers. Clarifying agents include isinglass, from the swimbladders of fish; Irish moss, a seaweed; kappa carrageenan, from the seaweed Kappaphycus cottonii; Polyclar (artificial); and gelatin. Beer marked "suitable for vegans" is clarified either with seaweed or with artificial agents.

=== Industry ===
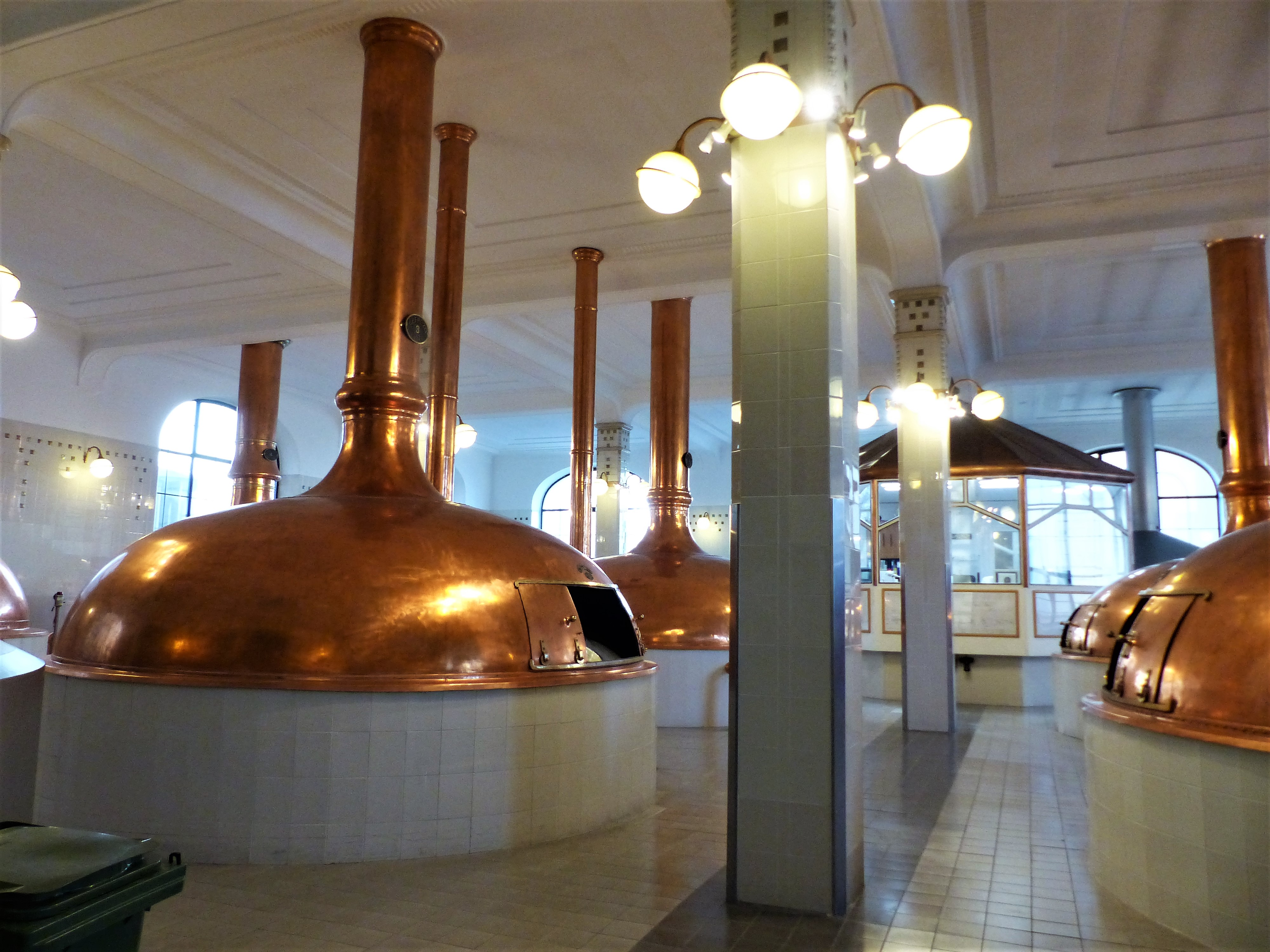
Industrial brewing

In the 21st century, larger breweries have repeatedly taken over smaller breweries. In 2002, South African Breweries bought the North American Miller Brewing Company to found SABMiller, becoming the second-largest brewery after North American Anheuser-Busch. In 2004, the Belgian Interbrew was the third-largest brewery by volume, and the Brazilian AmBev was the fifth-largest. They merged into InBev, becoming the largest brewery. In 2007, SABMiller surpassed InBev and Anheuser-Busch when it acquired Royal Grolsch, the brewer of Dutch brand Grolsch. In 2008, when InBev (the second-largest) bought Anheuser-Busch (the third-largest), the new Anheuser-Busch InBev company became again the largest brewer in the world. As of 2020, according to the market research firm Technavio, AB InBev was the largest brewing company in the world, with Heineken second, CR Snow third, Carlsberg fourth, and Molson Coors fifth.

Beer consumption per person

A microbrewery, or craft brewery, produces a limited amount of beer. The maximum amount of beer a brewery can produce and still be classed as a 'microbrewery' varies by region and by authority; in the US, it is 15,000 US beer barrels (1.8 megalitres; 390 thousand imperial gallons; 460 thousand US gallons) a year. A brewpub is a type of microbrewery that incorporates a pub or other drinking establishment. The highest density of breweries in the world, most of them microbreweries, exists in Franconia, Germany, especially in the district of Upper Franconia, which has about 200 breweries. The Benedictine Weihenstephan brewery in Bavaria, Germany, can trace its roots to the year 768, as a document from that year refers to a hop garden in the area paying a tithe to the monastery. It claims to be the oldest working brewery in the world.

== Varieties ==
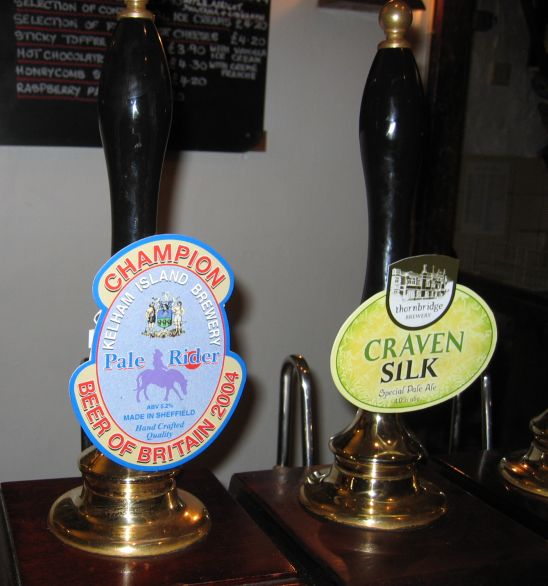
Cask ale hand pumps with pump clips detailing the beers and their breweries

=== Top-fermented beers ===
Top-fermented beers are most commonly produced with Saccharomyces cerevisiae, a top-fermenting yeast which clumps and rises to the surface, typically between 15 and 25 °C (59 and 77 °F). At these temperatures, yeast produces significant amounts of esters and other secondary flavour and aroma products, and the result is often a beer with slightly "fruity" compounds resembling apple, pear, pineapple, banana, plum, or prune, among others. After the introduction of hops into England from Flanders in the 15th century, "ale" came to mean an unhopped fermented brew, while "beer" meant a brew with an infusion of hops. The term 'real ale' was coined by the Campaign for Real Ale (CAMRA) in 1973 for "beer brewed from traditional ingredients, matured by secondary fermentation in the container from which it is dispensed, and served without the use of extraneous carbon dioxide". It is applied to both bottle conditioned and cask conditioned beers.

As for the types of top-fermented beers, pale ale predominantly uses pale malt. It is one of the world's major beer styles and includes India pale ale (IPA). Mild ale has a predominantly malty palate. It is usually dark, with an abv of 3% to 3.6%. Wheat beer is brewed with a large proportion of wheat although it often also contains a significant proportion of malted barley. Wheat beers are usually top-fermented. Stout is a dark beer made using roasted barley, and typically brewed with slow fermenting yeast. There are a number of variations including dry stout (such as Guinness), sweet stout, and Imperial (or Russian) stout. Stout was originally the strongest variety of porter, a dark brown beer popular with the street and river porters of eighteenth century London.

=== Bottom-fermented beers ===
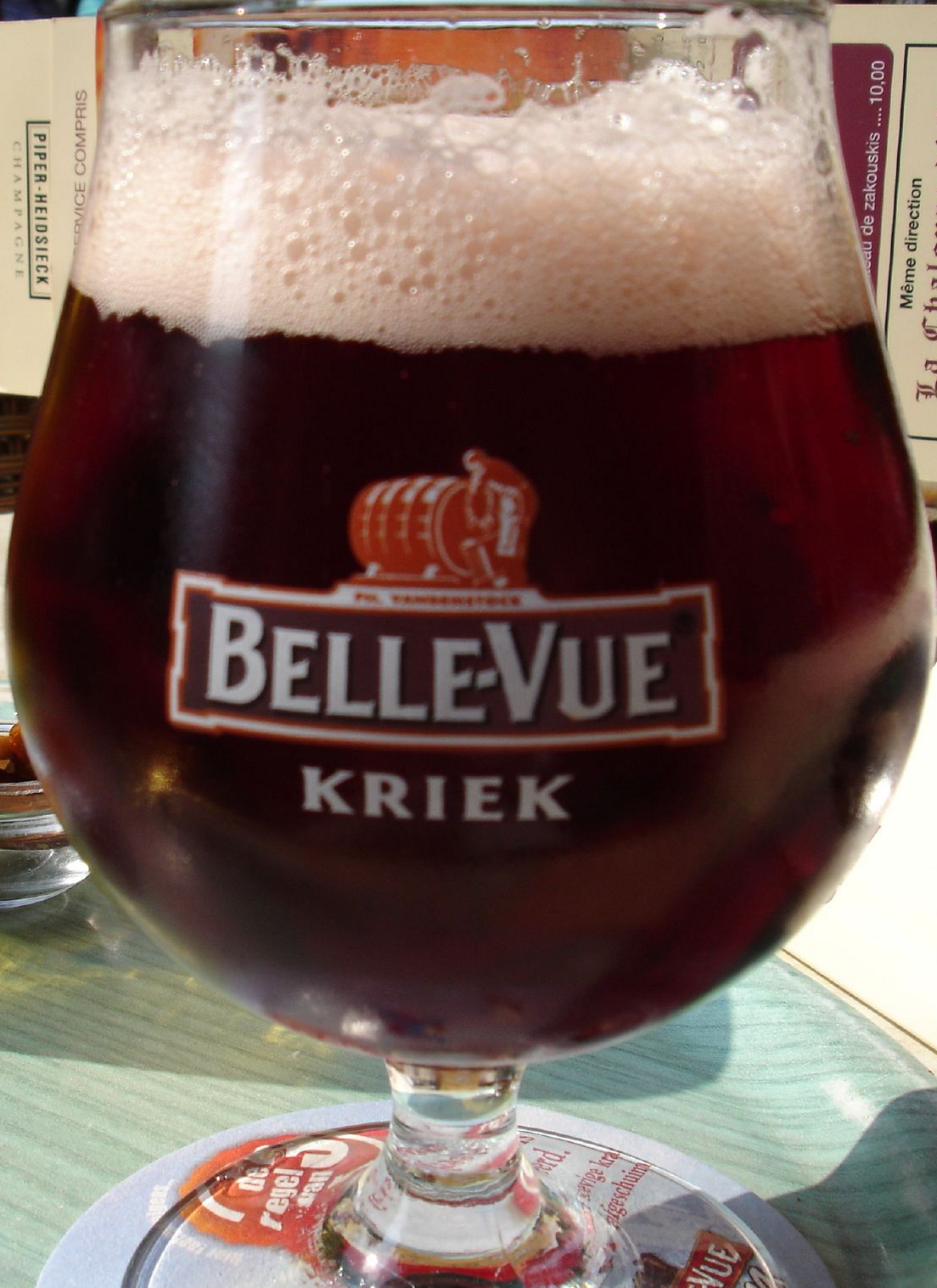
Kriek, a lambic beer brewed with cherries

Lager is cool-fermented beer. Pale lagers are the most commonly drunk beers in the world. Many are of the "pilsner" type. The name "lager" comes from the German "lagern" for "to store", as brewers in Bavaria stored beer in cool cellars during the warm summer months, allowing the beers to continue to ferment, and to clear any sediment. Lager yeast is a cool bottom-fermenting yeast (Saccharomyces pastorianus). Lager typically undergoes primary fermentation at 7–12 °C (45–54 °F), and then a long secondary fermentation at 0–4 °C (32–39 °F) (the lagering phase). During the secondary stage, the lager clears and mellows. The cooler conditions inhibit the natural production of esters and other byproducts, resulting in a "cleaner"-tasting beer. With improved modern yeast strains, most lager breweries use only short periods of cold storage, typically no more than 2 weeks. Some traditional lagers are still stored for several months.

=== Lambic ===
Lambic, a beer of Belgium, is naturally fermented using wild yeasts, rather than cultivated. Many of these are not strains of brewer's yeast (Saccharomyces cerevisiae) and may have significant differences in aroma and sourness. Yeast varieties such as Brettanomyces bruxellensis and Brettanomyces lambicus are common in lambics. In addition, other organisms such as Lactobacillus bacteria produce acids which contribute to the sourness.

=== Non-barley beers ===
Around the world, many traditional and ancient starch-based drinks are classed as beer. In Africa, there are ethnic beers made from sorghum or millet, such as Oshikundu in Namibia and Tella in Ethiopia. Kyrgyzstan also has a beer made from millet; it is a low alcohol, somewhat porridge-like drink called "Bozo". Bhutan, Nepal, Tibet and Sikkim also use millet in Chhaang, a popular semi-fermented rice/millet drink in the eastern Himalayas.

The Andes in South America has Chicha, made from germinated maize (corn); while the indigenous peoples in Brazil have Cauim, a traditional drink made since pre-Columbian times by chewing manioc so that an enzyme (amylase) present in human saliva can break down the starch into fermentable sugars; this is similar to Masato in Peru.

Beers made from bread, among the earliest forms of the drink, are Sahti in Finland, Kvass in Russia and Ukraine, and Bouza in Sudan. 4000 years ago fermented bread was used in Mesopotamia. Food waste activists got inspired by these ancient recipes and use leftover bread to replace a third of the malted barley that would otherwise be used for brewing their craft ale.

== Measurement ==
Beer is measured and assessed by colour, by strength and by bitterness. The strength of modern beer is usually around 4% to 6%, measured as alcohol by volume (ABV). The perceived bitterness is measured by the International Bitterness Units scale (IBU), defined in co-operation between the American Society of Brewing Chemists and the European Brewery Convention. The international scale was a development of the European Bitterness Units scale, often abbreviated as EBU, and the bitterness values should be identical.

=== Colour ===
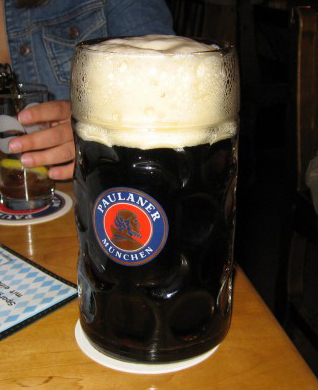
Paulaner dunkel – a dark lager

Beer colour is determined by the malt. The most common colour is a pale amber produced from using pale malts. Pale lager and pale ale are terms used for beers made from malt dried and roasted with the fuel coke. Coke was first used for roasting malt in 1642, but it was not until around 1703 that the term pale ale was used.

In terms of sales volume, most of today's beer is based on the pale lager brewed in 1842 in the city of Plzeň in the present-day Czech Republic. The modern pale lager is light in colour due to use of coke for kilning, which gives off heat with little smoke.

Dark beers are usually brewed from a pale malt or lager malt base with a small proportion of darker malt added to achieve the desired shade. Other colourants—such as caramel—are also widely used to darken beers. Very dark beers, such as stout, use dark or patent malts that have been roasted longer. Some have roasted unmalted barley.

=== Strength ===
Beer ranges from less than 3% alcohol by volume (abv) to around 14% abv, though this strength can be increased to around 20% by re-pitching with champagne yeast, and to 55% ABV by the freeze-distilling process. The alcohol content of beer varies by local practice or beer style. The pale lagers that most consumers are familiar with fall in the range of 4–6%, with a typical ABV of 5%. The customary strength of British ales is quite low, with many session beers being around 4% abv. In Belgium, some beers, such as table beer are of such low alcohol content (1%–4%) that they are served instead of soft drinks in some schools. The weakest beers are described as 'alcohol-free', typically containing 0.05% ABV; this compares to low alcohol beers which may contain 1.2% ABV or less, and conventional beers which average 4.4% ABV.

The strength of beers has climbed during the later years of the 20th century. Vetter 33, a 10.5% ABV (33 degrees Plato, hence Vetter "33") doppelbock, was listed in the 1994 Guinness Book of World Records as the strongest beer at that time, though Samichlaus, by the Swiss brewer Hürlimann, had also been listed by the Guinness Book of World Records as the strongest at 14% ABV. Since then, some brewers have used champagne yeasts to increase the alcohol content of their beers. Samuel Adams reached 20% ABV with Millennium, and then surpassed that amount to 25.6% ABV with Utopias. The strongest beer brewed in Britain was Baz's Super Brew by Parish Brewery, a 23% ABV beer. In September 2011, the Scottish brewery BrewDog produced Ghost Deer, which, at 28%, they claim to be the world's strongest beer produced by fermentation alone.

The product claimed to be the strongest beer made is Schorschbräu's 2011 Schorschbock 57 with 57.5% ABV. It was preceded by The End of History, a 55% Belgian ale, made by BrewDog in 2010. The same company had previously made Sink The Bismarck!, a 41% ABV IPA, and Tactical Nuclear Penguin, a 32% ABV Imperial stout. Each of these beers are made using the eisbock method of fractional freezing, in which a strong ale is partially frozen and the ice is repeatedly removed, until the desired strength is reached, a process that may class the product as spirits rather than beer. The German brewery Schorschbräu's Schorschbock, a 31% ABV eisbock, and Hair of the Dog's Dave, a 29% ABV barley wine made in 1994, used the same fractional freezing method. A 60% ABV blend of beer with whiskey was jokingly claimed as the strongest beer by a Dutch brewery in July 2010.

== Serving ==
=== Draught ===
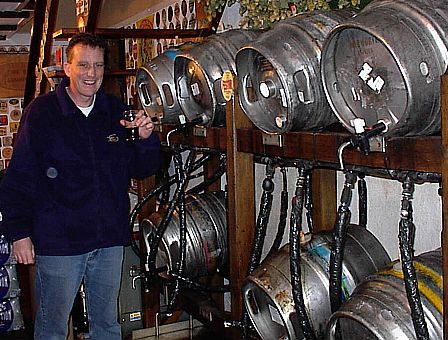
A selection of cask beers

Draught (also spelt "draft") beer from a pressurised keg using a lever-style dispenser and a spout is the most common method of dispensing in bars around the world. A metal keg is pressurised with carbon dioxide (CO_{2}) gas which drives the beer to the dispensing tap or faucet. Some beers may be served with a nitrogen/carbon dioxide mixture. Nitrogen produces fine bubbles, resulting in a dense head and a creamy mouthfeel. In the 1980s, Guinness introduced the beer widget, a nitrogen-pressurised ball inside a can which creates a moderately dense, tight head. This approximates the effect of serving from a keg, at least for a British-style beer which does not have a specially large head.

Cask-conditioned ales (or cask ales) are unfiltered and unpasteurised beers. These beers are termed "real ale" by the CAMRA organisation. When a cask arrives in a pub, it is placed horizontally on a "stillage" frame, designed to hold it steady and at the right angle, and then allowed to cool to cellar temperature (typically between 11–13 °C or 52–55 °F), before being tapped and vented—a tap is driven through a rubber bung at the bottom of one end, and a hard spile is used to open a hole in the uppermost side of the cask. The act of stillaging and then venting a beer in this manner typically disturbs all the sediment, so it must be left for a suitable period of hours to days to "drop" (clear) again, as well as to fully condition the beer. At this point the beer is ready to sell, either being pulled through a beer line with a hand pump, or simply being "gravity-fed" directly into the glass.

Draught beer's environmental impact can be 68% lower than bottled beer due to packaging differences. A life cycle study of one beer brand, including grain production, brewing, bottling, distribution and waste management, shows that the CO_{2} emissions from a 6-pack of micro-brew beer is about 3 kilograms (6.6 pounds). The loss of natural habitat potential from the 6-pack of micro-brew beer is estimated to be 2.5 square metres (26 square feet). Downstream emissions from distribution, retail, storage and disposal of waste can be over 45% of a bottled micro-brew beer's CO_{2} emissions. Where legal, the use of a refillable jug, reusable bottle or other reusable containers to transport draught beer from a store or a bar, rather than buying pre-bottled beer, can reduce the environmental impact of beer consumption.

=== Packaging ===
A selection of Belgian, Danish, Dutch, German, and Irish beers

Most beers are cleared of yeast by filtering when packaged in bottles and cans. However, bottle conditioned beers retain some yeast—either by being unfiltered, or by being filtered and then reseeded with fresh yeast.

Many beers are sold in cans, though there is considerable variation in the proportion between different countries. In Sweden in 2001, 63.9% of beer was sold in cans. People either drink from the can or pour the beer into a glass. A technology developed by Crown Holdings for the 2010 FIFA World Cup is the 'full aperture' can, so named because the entire lid is removed during the opening process, turning the can into a drinking cup. Cans protect the beer from light (thereby preventing spoilage) and have a seal less prone to leaking over time than bottles. Cans were initially viewed as a technological breakthrough for maintaining the quality of a beer, then became commonly associated with less expensive, mass-produced beers, even though the quality of storage in cans is much like bottles. Plastic (PET) bottles are used by some breweries.

=== Temperature ===
The temperature of a beer has an influence on a drinker's experience; warmer temperatures reveal the range of flavours in a beer but cooler temperatures are more refreshing. Most drinkers prefer pale lager to be served chilled, a low- or medium-strength pale ale to be served cool, while a strong barley wine or imperial stout to be served at room temperature.

Beer writer Michael Jackson proposed a five-level scale for serving temperatures: well chilled (7 °C or 45 °F) for "light" beers (pale lagers); chilled (8 °C or 46 °F) for Berliner Weisse and other wheat beers; lightly chilled (9 °C or 48 °F) for all dark lagers, altbier and German wheat beers; cellar temperature (13 °C or 55 °F) for regular British ale, stout and most Belgian specialities; and room temperature (15.5 °C or 60 °F) for strong dark ales (especially trappist beer) and barley wine.

Drinking chilled beer began with the development of artificial refrigeration and by the 1870s, was spread in those countries that concentrated on brewing pale lager. Chilling beer makes it more refreshing, though below 15.5 °C (60 °F) the chilling starts to reduce taste awareness and reduces it significantly below 10 °C (50 °F). Beer served unchilled—either cool or at room temperature—reveal more of their flavours. Cask Marque, a non-profit UK beer organisation, has set a temperature standard range of 12°–14 °C (53°–57 °F) for cask ales to be served.

=== Vessels ===
Beer is consumed out of a variety of vessels, such as a glass, a beer stein, a mug, a pewter tankard, a beer bottle or a can; or at music festivals and some bars and nightclubs, from a plastic cup. The shape of the glass from which beer is consumed can influence the perception of the beer and can define and accent the character of the style. Breweries offer branded glassware intended only for their own beers as a marketing promotion, as this increases sales of their product.

The pouring process has an influence on a beer's presentation. The rate of flow from the tap or other serving vessel, tilt of the glass, and position of the pour (in the centre or down the side) into the glass all influence the result, such as the size and longevity of the head, lacing (the pattern left by the head as it moves down the glass as the beer is drunk), and the release of carbonation.

A beer tower or portable beer tap is sometimes used in bars and restaurants to allow a group of customers to serve themselves. The device consists of a tall container with a cooling mechanism and a beer tap at its base.

== Chemistry ==
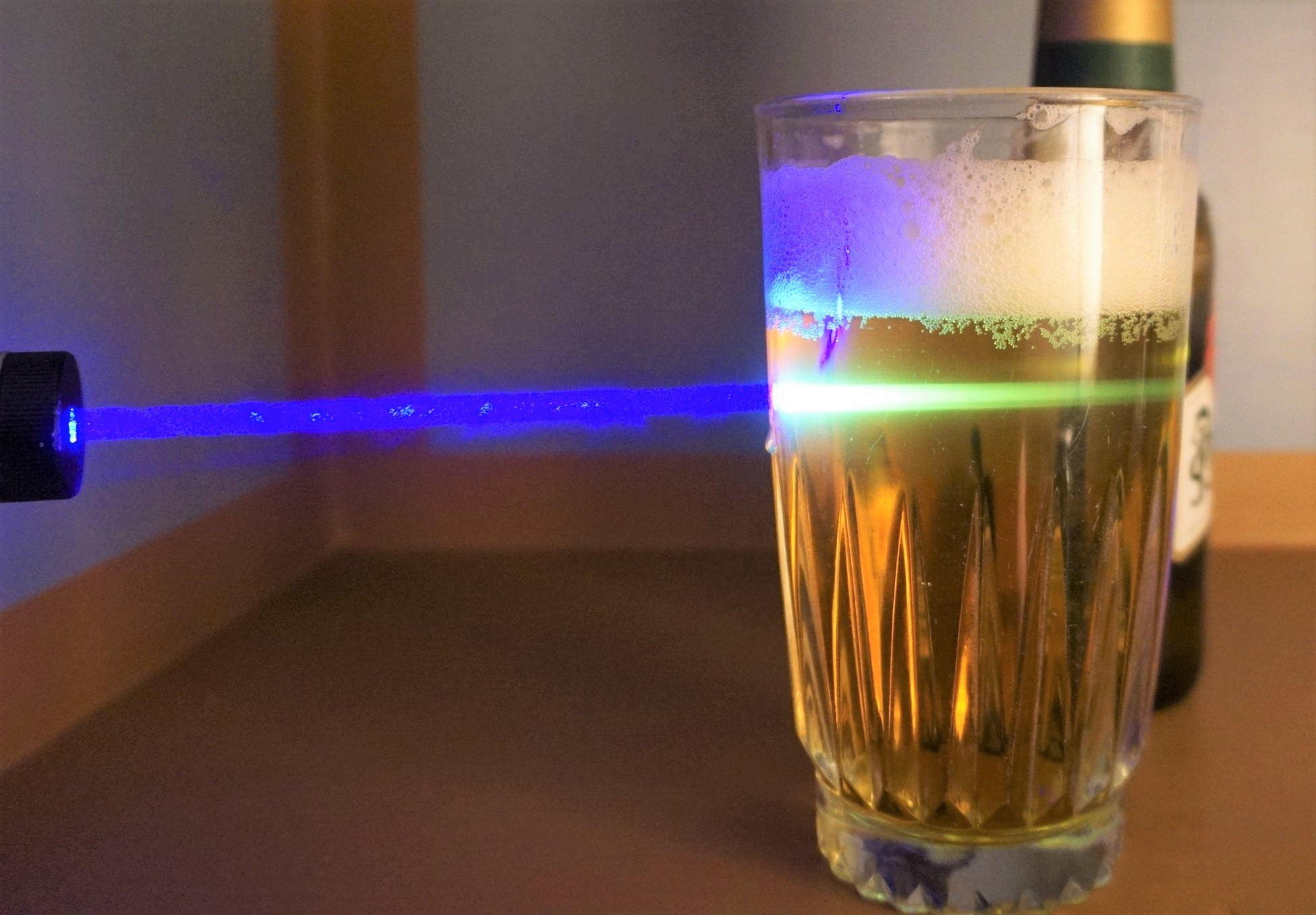
Organic aromatic acids found naturally in beer, such as tryptophan, tyrosine, and phenylalanine, absorb blue light and fluoresce in green under 450 nm laser light.

Beer contains the phenolic acids 4-hydroxyphenylacetic acid, vanillic acid, caffeic acid, syringic acid, p-coumaric acid, ferulic acid, and sinapic acid. Alkaline hydrolysis experiments show that most of the phenolic acids are present as bound forms and only a small portion can be detected as free compounds. Hops, and beer made with it, contain 8-prenylnaringenin which is a potent phytoestrogen. Hop also contains myrcene, humulene, xanthohumol, isoxanthohumol, myrcenol, linalool, tannins, and resin. The alcohol 2M2B is a component of hops brewing.

Barley, in the form of malt, brings the condensed tannins prodelphinidins B3, B9 and C2 into beer. Tryptophol, tyrosol, and phenylethanol are aromatic higher alcohols (congeners) produced by yeast during the brewing process. as secondary products of alcoholic fermentation

=== Nutrition ===
Beers vary in their nutritional content. The ingredients used to make beer, including the yeast, provide a rich source of nutrients; therefore beer may contain nutrients including magnesium, selenium, potassium, phosphorus, biotin, chromium and B vitamins. Beer is sometimes referred to as "liquid bread", though beer is not a meal in itself.

Nutrition from different beers (serving size: 12 oz./355 ml)
Beer Brand	Carbohydrate (g)	Alcohol (%)	Energy (kcal)
Budweiser Select 55	1.8	2.4	55
Coors Light	5	4.2	102
Guinness Draught	10	4.0	126
Sierra Nevada Bigfoot	30.3	9.6	330

== Health effects ==
A 2018 systematic analysis found that ethanol consumption increases mortality rate. Alcohol use is the third leading cause of early deaths in the United States. In the United States, a total of 88,000 deaths per year (5.9% of all deaths) are believed to be due to alcohol. No professional medical association recommends that people who are nondrinkers should start drinking alcoholic beverages. Some studies have concluded that drinking small quantities of alcohol (less than one drink in women and two in men, per day) is associated with a decreased risk of heart disease, stroke, diabetes mellitus, and early death, but some of these studies combined former ethanol drinkers and lifelong abstainers into a single group of nondrinkers, which obscures the health benefits of lifelong abstention from ethanol. The long-term health effects of continuous, moderate or heavy alcohol consumption include the risk of developing alcoholism and alcoholic liver disease. In addition, like all alcoholic drinks, it is an IARC group 1 carcinogen.

Alcoholism, also known as "alcohol use disorder", is a broad term for any drinking of alcohol that results in problems. It was previously divided into two types: alcohol abuse and alcohol dependence. In a medical context, alcoholism is said to exist when two or more of the following conditions are present: a person drinks large amounts over a long time period, has difficulty cutting down, acquiring and drinking alcohol takes up a great deal of time, alcohol is strongly desired, usage results in not fulfilling responsibilities, usage results in social problems, usage results in health problems, usage results in risky situations, withdrawal occurs when stopping, and alcohol tolerance has occurred with use. Alcoholism reduces a person's life expectancy by around ten years.

Overeating and lack of muscle tone is the main cause of a beer belly, rather than beer consumption, though a 2004 study found a link between binge drinking and a beer belly. Some diet books in the past suggested that beer has an undesirably high glycemic index of 110, the same as maltose; however, the maltose in beer is metabolised by yeast during fermentation, thus beer consists mostly of water, hop oils and only trace amounts of sugars, including maltose.

The multi-step process of beer production is effective at removing pesticide residues from grain. At each step (e.g. mashing or malting) pesticide levels are typically reduced by 50-90%, varying with the particular process and pesticide's chemical properties.

== See also ==
- List of beer and breweries by region
- List of barley-based drinks
- List of beer cocktails
- List of drinks
- List of countries by beer consumption per capita
- List of food and drink awards
- List of national drinks
