= Prodelphinidin C2 =

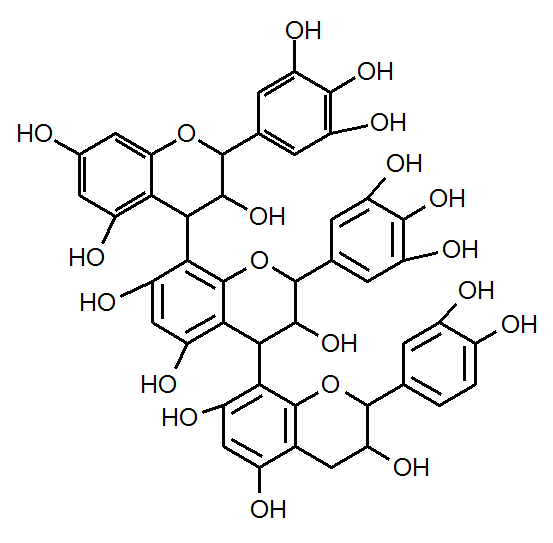

Names
- IUPAC name (2R,3S,4R)-4-[(2R,3S)-2-(3,4-dihydroxyphenyl)-3,5,7-trihydroxy-3,4-dihydro-2H-chromen-8-yl]-2-(3,4,5-trihydroxyphenyl)-8-[(2R,3S,4S)-3,5,7-trihydroxy-2-(3,4,5-trihydroxyphenyl)-3,4-dihydro-2H-chromen-4-yl]-3,4-dihydro-2H-chromene-3,5,7-triol
- Other names gallocatechin-(4α→8)-gallocatechin-(4α→8)-catechin

Identifiers
| CAS Number | 79136-97-3 |
| 3D model (JSmol) | Interactive image |
| ChemSpider | 71044268 |
| PubChem CID | 71623698 |
| CompTox Dashboard (EPA) | DTXSID30904148 |
- InChI: InChI=1S/C45H38O20/c46-16-8-21(50)31-30(9-16)63-42(14-4-25(54)37(59)26(55)5-14)39(61)35(31)33-23(52)12-24(53)34-36(40(62)43(65-45(33)34)15-6-27(56)38(60)28(57)7-15)32-22(51)11-19(48)17-10-29(58)41(64-44(17)32)13-1-2-18(47)20(49)3-13/h1-9,11-12,29,35-36,39-43,46-62H,10H2/t29-,35-,36+,39-,40-,41+,42+,43+/m0/s1 Key: RJFFPCHJOFXZQD-YTSXHMEESA-N
- SMILES: C1[C@@H]([C@H](OC2=C1C(=CC(=C2[C@H]3[C@@H]([C@H](OC4=C(C(=CC(=C34)O)O)[C@H]5[C@@H]([C@H](OC6=CC(=CC(=C56)O)O)C7=CC(=C(C(=C7)O)O)O)O)C8=CC(=C(C(=C8)O)O)O)O)O)O)C9=CC(=C(C=C9)O)O)O

Properties
| Chemical formula | C_{45}H_{38}O_{20} |
| Molar mass | 898.77 g/mol |
- Except where otherwise noted, data are given for materials in their standard state (at 25 °C [77 °F], 100 kPa). Infobox references

Prodelphinidin C2 is a prodelphinidin trimer found in malt.
