= Prodelphinidin B3 =

Names
- IUPAC name 2-(3,4-dihydroxyphenyl)-8-[3,5,7-trihydroxy-2-(3,4,5-trihydroxyphenyl)-3,4-dihydro-2H-chromen-4-yl]-3,4-dihydro-2H-chromene-3,5,7-triol
- Other names gallocatechin-(4α→8)-catechin GC-(4,8)-C; Dimer GC-C

Identifiers
CAS Number	78362-05-7
3D model (JSmol)	Interactive image
ChemSpider	35014448
PubChem CID	13831061
UNII	YKF63X6RDD
- InChI: InChI=1S/C30H26O13/c31-12-6-17(35)23-22(7-12)42-29(11-4-19(37)26(40)20(38)5-11)27(41)25(23)24-18(36)9-15(33)13-8-21(39)28(43-30(13)24)10-1-2-14(32)16(34)3-10/h1-7,9,21,25,27-29,31-41H,8H2 Key: ZYDDITZPGFXQSD-UHFFFAOYSA-N
- SMILES: C1C(C(OC2=C1C(=CC(=C2C3C(C(OC4=CC(=CC(=C34)O)O)C5=CC(=C(C(=C5)O)O)O)O)O)O)C6=CC(=C(C(=C6))O)O)O

Properties
Chemical formula	C_{30}H_{26}O_{13}
Molar mass	594.525 g·mol^{−1}
- Except where otherwise noted, data are given for materials in their standard state (at 25 °C [77 °F], 100 kPa). Infobox references

Prodelphinidin B3 is a prodelphinidin dimer found in food products such as barley and beer, in fruits and pod vegetables. It can also be found in pomegranate peels.

It can also be synthesized.
