= Resource slack =

Level of availability of a resource

Resource slack, in the business and management literature, is the level of availability of a resource. Resource slack can be considered as the opposite of resource scarcity or resource constraints.

The availability of resources can therefore be defined in terms of resource slack versus constraints, as two ends of a continuum. Resource slack then refers to the relative abundance of the resource, and resource constraints refer to its limited availability. However, the effects of both resource slack and resource constraints are ambiguous, as both can have both negative and positive consequences. Both new and established firms need resources for their survival, growth and sustainable competitive advantage. On the other hand, severe resource constraints hinder the growth of firms and lower the probability of their survival. However, resource constraints have also been observed to foster creativity and force firms to deal with problems promptly. Moreover, slack resources tend to improve firms' financial performance, serve to buffer environmental shocks and allow for more discretion and flexibility in responding to competitors. However, large amounts of resources could also hinder the entrepreneurial process by impairing the firm's ability to identify new business opportunities.

These contradictory potential outcomes of resource slack/constraints on creativity and performance have been explained in terms of an inverse U-shaped relationship and context-dependent effects, as well as the underlying dynamics of resource constraints and slack. The latter dynamic perspective implies that, for example, entrepreneurs perceive resource constraints/slack as transient positions relative to their start-up's own resource demands at any given moment.

== See also ==
- Management
- Management science
- Resource
- Resource-based view
- Strategy
