= Beer distribution =

Beer distribution worldwide has several different steps, ranging from the production of supplies used in the making of beer to selling it in stores, with many separate interactions in between. In general, beer distribution can be shown by a three tiered or two tiered model of distribution, with most of the world partaking in the latter.

Even with a slow decrease in the sale of beer over the last five years., beer is still one of the most common beverages throughout the world, making its distribution very important worldwide, with approximately 202,200,000 barrels being sold in 2018, equal to 8.5 trillion gallons of beer. Beer sales are most common in areas throughout Europe as well as America.

== American Beer Distribution ==
Before American prohibition in 1919, breweries created deals with bars where they would only sell their brand of beer at these certain bars, without the variety of beers that is common in today's bars. Breweries took stake in bars and provided them with the things a bar needs to function, like equipment, furniture, and beer.

Breweries pushed bars to sell an excessive amount of their beer since they had so much investment in these bars and wanted to increase their profits with the sale of more beer being the only way to accomplish this. This excessive pushing of beer on the public was seen as a negative by the American government and was a leading cause for Prohibition, a ban on any production, consumption, or sale of alcohol in the United States.

Prohibition in the United States lasted from 1919 to 1933 and caused major changes to the way beer was distributed and consumed.

=== Three Tier distribution in America ===
In America, the end of prohibition in 1933 led to the required implementation of a three tiered process of alcohol sales in every state except for the State of Washington. This was put into place in an attempt to increase tax revenue from beer, make it easier to regulate, and create a safer environment for consumers. While it seemed like a simple solution to the process of beer sales, it did however face some backlash.

Beer distribution includes three tiers: the producers, distributors, and buyers. In this case, producers are the breweries, buyers are the bars or retailers, and the distributor is the middle man that moves the beer from the breweries to the bars. This system eliminates the ability for the breweries to directly sell their beer to anyone but the intermediaries.

The addition of the wholesale beer distributors meant more than one type of beer being sold in a single bar since the distributors were free to sell to whoever they wanted to, and had no stake in any bars they sold to. Breweries now had much less control over individual bars or pubs and therefore they were not capable of excessively pushing the sales of their own beer in specific bars. Also having distributors can make it easier to spread breweries brands outside of their local market reach to different buyers. It is beneficial for distributors to diversity their selection of beer along with how many buyers they are selling to, which is also beneficial for breweries as it is more likely that a distributor would be inclined to buy their product and sell it to many bars and retailers.

With three distinct levels to this system, it made regulating the sale of beer much easier. Trade from each tier to the next is tracked and every party involved is responsible for ensuring the quality and safety of the beer at each step.

Introducing private distributors into the beer distributing process meant for more mouths to be fed, since instead of two parties involved it is now three. This was accounted for in the rise of beer prices in the United States. In 2017 federal tax revenue from the sale of alcohol was 12% of the total excise receipts, equal to $9.9 billion

=== Opposition to the Three Tier System ===
There is also opposition to this three tiered system. Some major distributors have grown into larger corporations and have much more power over smaller sized breweries. Price negotiations become up to the distributors and breweries have no choice but to accept it as there is no alternative. Small breweries rely solely on independent distributors as it is legally their only method of moving their beer to the consumer. Corruption has spawned from the three tier system with distributors also having the power to cut off supply to retailers if the want just from the buyers not buying the specific brands they want to be sold.

Another complaint is that the three tiered system disrupts trade between countries. The European Union (EU) complains that it is difficult for European breweries to enter the American beer market because it can problematic to go through distributors in America when they have much easier access to American brands. On the other hand, large American breweries can easily infiltrate European markets by simply selling directly to bars or retailers if they have the funds to be able to successfully trade internationally.

== Worldwide distribution process ==
While countries like America have a system in place that allows only for a three tiered alcohol distribution system, many don't and allow breweries to sell straight to retailers or go through a third-party distributor. For example, most of the rest of the world's beer sales goes through the two tiered system still, with breweries supplying directly to bars or retailers (5).

Self-Distribution of beer can be seen as a positive by a few ways. Breweries selling to distributors costs money, coming from transportation and advertising costs that distributors force them to pay. When the distributor is cut out of the system breweries have the control over where their money is allocated and don't have to be strong-armed by distributors, which is often the case. Self-distributing also allows more control on how the beer is advertised and how it gets to buyers.

Disadvantages can come straight from cutting out the distributors, as breweries need more capital to distribute directly to retailers and bars. Self-distributing breweries need warehouse space, equipment, transportation, and more workers to be able to move their beer independently, making it difficult to small sized breweries to afford all of this. Micro-breweries especially find it difficult to move the beer outside of local reach with limited fund.
