= Alcohol in China =

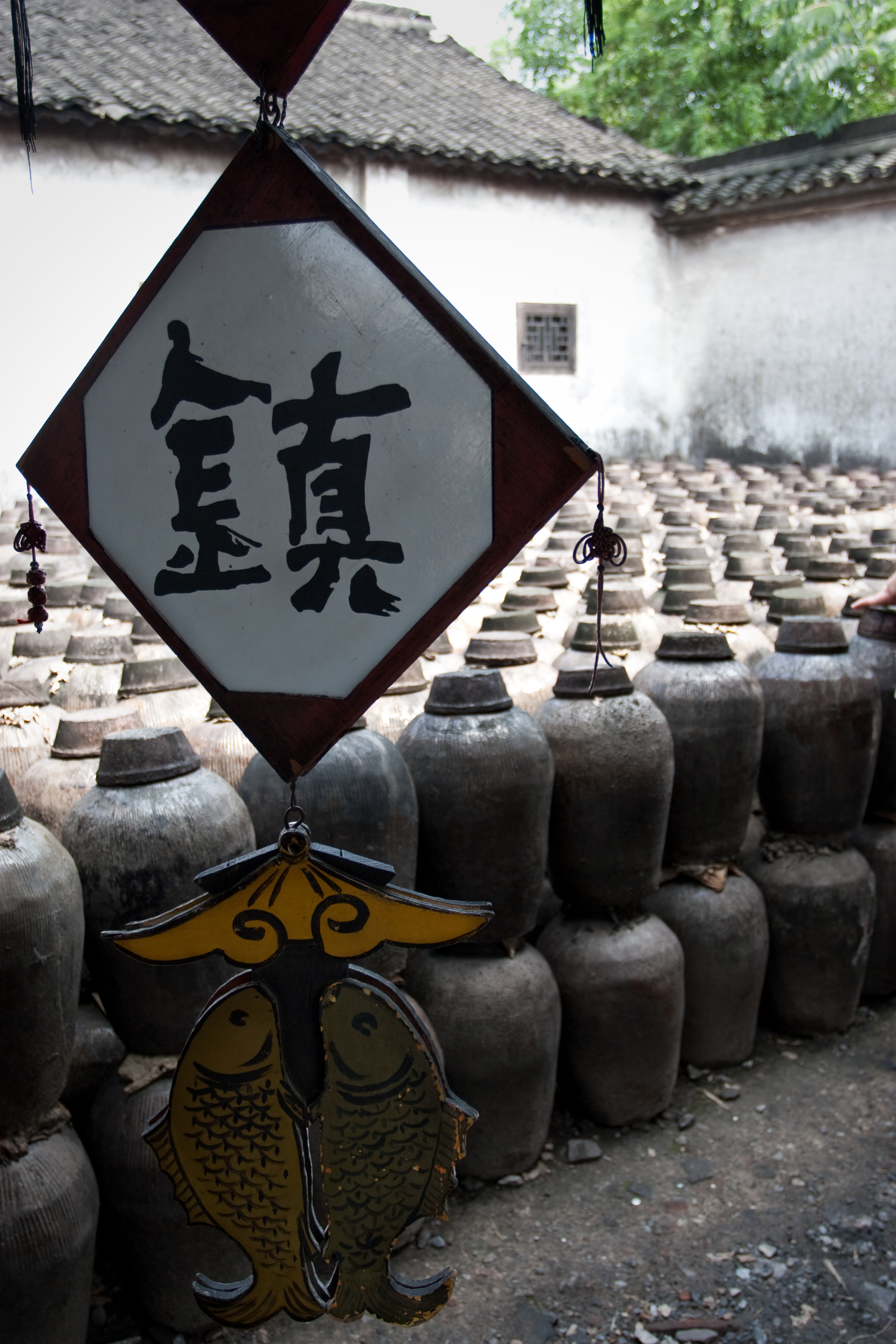
- The courtyard of a Chinese vintner, including sealed jars of huangjiu being stored and aged
- Chinese: 酒
Transcriptions
Standard Mandarin
- Hanyu Pinyin: jiǔ
Yue: Cantonese
- Jyutping: zau^{2}
Southern Min
- Hokkien POJ: chiú

There is a long history of the production and consumption and use of alcohol in China. Alcoholic beverages in China have included rice and grape or other fruit wine, beer, fermented milk beverages, and distilled products such as whisky and various other liquors including baijiu, the most-consumed distilled spirit in the world. From ancient China to modern China there is a multi-millennial history continuing through the present day.

There are various names for Chinese beverages of differing types, however the generic term jiǔ is primary. By whatever name, the cultural significance of alcohol in China is extensive.

The history of alcohol in China includes the ancient period which is mostly known by archeological evidence supplemented with early classical texts together with mythographic material. During the various dynasties of imperial phases of China there were continuing developments both in terms of technology and cultural references, distillation being one of the important developments. Cultural developments around wine and other alcoholic beverages include poetry, painting, calligraphy, and ceremonial use. There are various unknowns, including the development of distillation. There have been many variations in terms of recipes and regional differences. Sometimes the recipes for alcoholic beverages include other ingredients which may have a medically recognized or a culturally believed affect. In modern China, there is significant cultural continuity and also newer phenomena such as the use of European beer production techniques and significant development of wine production using European grape varieties and vinting practices.

== Name ==
酒 (jiǔ) is the Chinese character referring to any drink containing appreciable quantities of ethanol. Its Old Chinese pronunciation has been reconstructed as *tsuʔ, at which point it was generally applied to drinks made from fermented millet. By the time of the first certain use of distillation during the Jin and Southern Song dynasties, the Middle Chinese pronunciation was tsjuw. It is often translated in English as "wine", which misrepresents its current usage. In present-day Mandarin, jiǔ most commonly refers to pure alcohol, hard liquors, and strong rice wine, while wine and beer are distinguished as pútáojiǔ (葡萄酒, lit. "grape jiu") and píjiǔ (啤酒, "'beer' jiu"), respectively.

Nonetheless, there are many cultural parallels with the use of wine in European culture. Chinese food employs jiǔ in its recipes and formal dining in an analogous manner; likewise, there are many parallels in upper-class etiquette and religious observance. It appears prominently in all of the Chinese classics, including the Rites of Zhou and the Record of Rites, and has been a constant theme of Chinese poetry since its origins, all similar to the treatment of wine in Europe.

== History ==
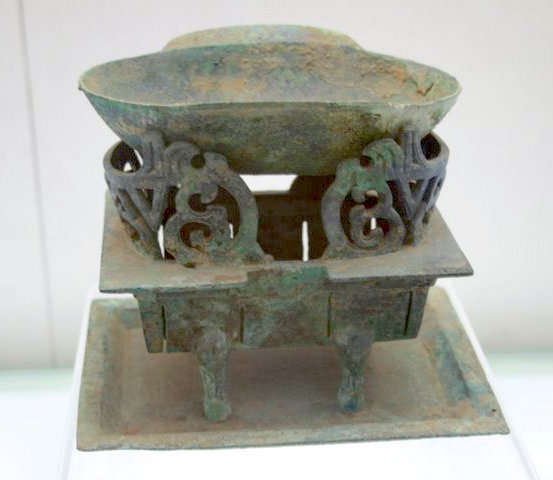
A bowl and stove used for the preparation of alcohol during the early Han dynasty, Luoyang Museum.

=== Ancient China ===
Chinese alcohol predates recorded history. Dried residue extracted from 9,000-year-old pottery implies that early beers were already being consumed by the Neolithic peoples in the area of modern China. Made from rice, honey, grapes, and hawthorn, it seems to have been produced similarly to that of Mesopotamia and Ancient Egypt.

Within the Yellow River area which gave rise to the Chinese culture, numerous bronze vessels preserved from the later Shang dynasty (whose oracle bones contained the first surviving Chinese characters) include many which were apparently used to warm alcohol. At the time, millet was the area's staple grain and these drinks may have been similar to modern huangjiu. Traditional Chinese historical accounts such as Sima Qian's Records of the Grand Historian relate various legends and myths concerning the origin of alcohol in China. One account says that the brewer Yidi presented the first alcoholic beverage as a gift to the emperor Yu the Great c. 2100 BC. Another credits its invention to Du Kang.

Chinese alcohol figured prominently in Zhou-era accounts of the removal of the Mandate of Heaven. The final ruler of the Xia dynasty, the emperor Jie, was said to have shown his decadence by constructing an entire lake of jiu to please one of his concubines. The pool was said to have been large enough to navigate with a boat. The story was repeated in accounts of Di Xin, the last emperor of the Shang. Alcoholism was said to have been so rampant among Shang culture that reducing it presented one of the principal difficulties for the new Zhou dynasty.

In the far northwest of modern China, the introduction of the irrigation and grape vines responsible for Xinjiang's raisin and wine production are generally credited to settlers from 4th-century BC Bactria, one of the successor states to the empire of Alexander the Great. However, new research has refuted the notions of a foreign origin for Chinese grape wine and grape vines, because the history of Chinese grape wine has been confirmed and proven to date back 9000 years (7000 BC), including the "(earliest attested use)" of wild grapes in wine as well as "earliest chemically confirmed alcoholic beverage in the world", according to Adjunct Professor of Anthropology Patrick McGovern, the Scientific Director of the Biomolecular Archaeology Project for Cuisine, Fermented Beverages, and Health at the University of Pennsylvania Museum in Philadelphia.

Professor McGovern explains:

The earliest chemically confirmed alcoholic beverage in the world was discovered at Jiahu in the Yellow River Valley of China (Henan province), ca. 7000–6600 B.C. (Early Neolithic Period). It was an extreme fermented beverage made of wild grapes (the earliest attested use), hawthorn, rice, and honey. The Jiahu discovery illustrates how you should never give up hope in finding chemical evidence for a fermented beverage from the Palaeolithic period. Research very often has big surprises in store. You might think, as I did too, that the grape wines of Hajji Firuz, the Caucasus, and eastern Anatolia would prove to be the earliest alcoholic beverages in the world, coming from the so-called "Cradle of Civilization" in the Near East as they do. But then I was invited to go to China on the other side of Asia, and came back with samples that proved to be even earlier–from around 7000 BC."

=== Imperial China ===
Following the Yangtze's incorporation into the Chinese state during the Qin dynasty, beer progressively disappeared from use over the course of the Han dynasty in favor of the stronger huangjiu and the rice wines of the southern Chinese. By the Tang dynasty, home brewing seems to have been a familiar domestic chore, although the poor had to make do with poorly filtered mash (醅, pēi). The sticky rice-based choujiu dates to at least the Tang and was specially praised by the Chinese poet Li Bai. The Dutch historian Frank Dikötter describes the period between the Han and Tang dynasties as a "golden age" for alcohol, when it was commonly consumed in conjunction with mineral drugs, notably Cold-Food Powder, until the "rise of a tea culture during the Tang was a significant shift away from heavier patterns of intoxication".

As noted in Shen Kuo's 11th-century Dream Pool Essays, much of the socializing among the gentry concerned "drinking guests" (jiuke). A symposium beginning with drinking huangjiu might involve playing the zither and chess, Zen meditation, calligraphy and painting, drinking tea, alchemy, and reciting poetry, as well as general conversation.

Distillation may have been practiced in China as early as the later Han but the earliest evidence so far discovered has been dated to the Jin and Southern Song. A still dating to the 12th century was found during an archaeological dig at Qinglong in Hebei. Despite the popularity of Islam in the Mongol Empire and its growth within China during the Mongolian Yuan dynasty, the common consumption of distilled spirits such as baijiu dates to the same era.

=== Modern China ===
Wine was reintroduced to China at Macao by Portuguese traders and missionaries, who produced small batches for communion. This connection is retained in the Chinese transcription of the name Portugal, 葡萄牙 or pútáoyá, lit. 'grape teeth'. The production and its effect was minor, prior to the opening of the country by the 19th-century First and Second Opium Wars, after which European alcoholic beverages and methods of alcohol production were introduced throughout China. This European influence is particularly marked in the case of beer, whose modern Chinese name pijiu is a Qing-era transcription of the English beer and German Bier. Two of the principal brewers in modern China, Tsingtao and Harbin, are named for the sites of the former major German and Russian breweries. Other establishments such as the EWO Brewery Ltd., (now owned by Suntory), grew up to serve demand for western beer in the Shanghai International Settlement.

Wine remained unfamiliar in China until Deng Xiaoping's post-1978 reform and opening up brought the country greater prosperity and greater integration into the world markets. From practically no consumption, it has already grown to either the fifth- or seventh-largest market for wine in the world with sales of 1.6 billion bottles during 2011, annualized growth rates of 20% between 2006 and 2011, and high future growth forecast. 28th Concours Mondial de Bruxelles, which is a global wine competition is scheduled to held during May 2021, at Yinchuan, China. China ranked 7th in the last competition in organic wine segment, which held in 2019.

== Types ==
=== Huangjiu ===
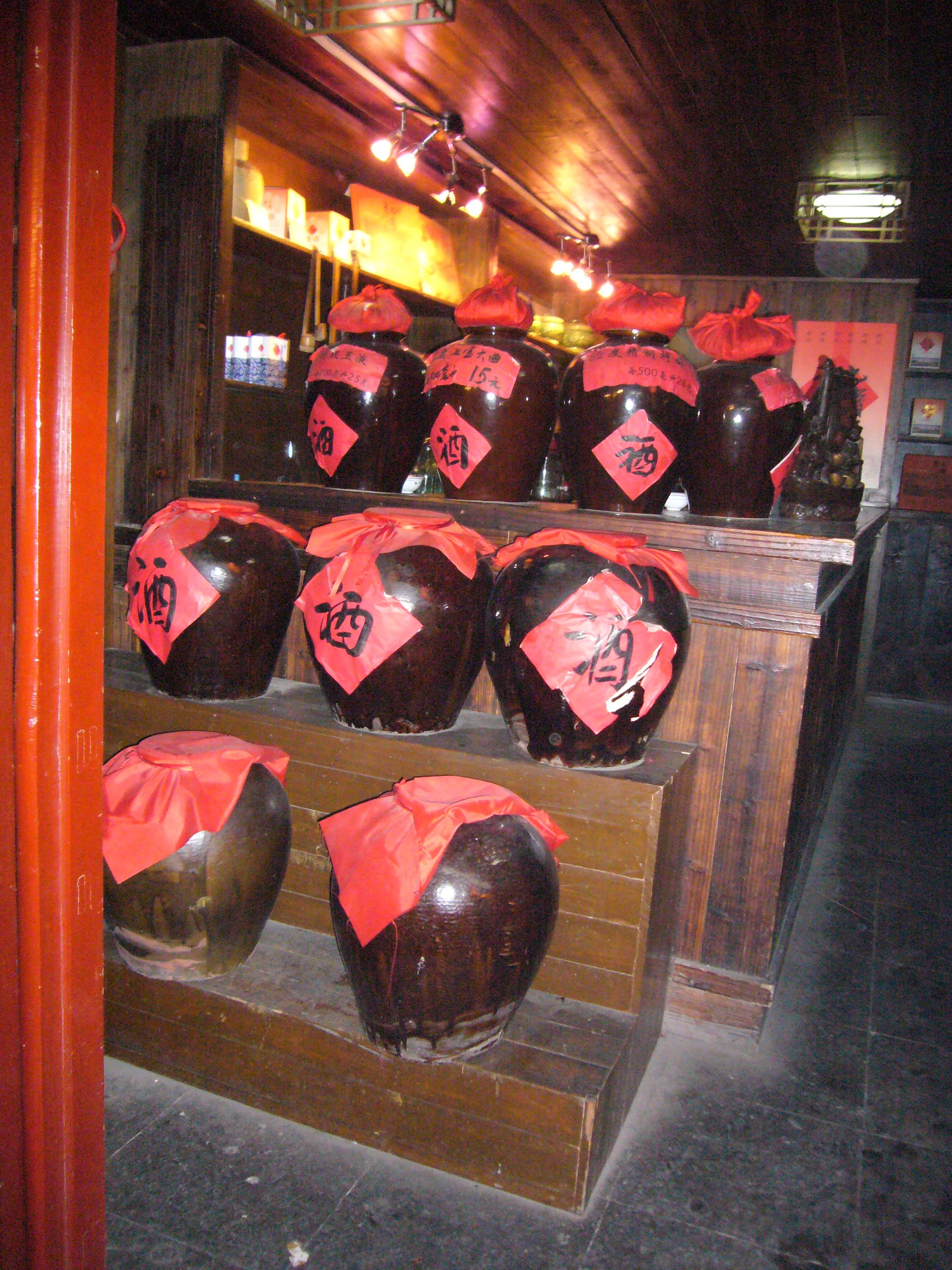
Classic rice wine container

Huangjiu or "yellow wine" is a fermented alcoholic beverage brewed directly from grains such as millet, rice, and wheat. It is not distilled but typically has an alcohol content around 15–20%. It is usually pasteurized, aged, and filtered prior to bottling. Despite its name, huangjiu may be clear, beige, or reddish as well as yellow. The Chinese mijiu, the predecessor of Japanese sake, is generally considered a form of huangjiu within China.

Huangjiu is further classified into various types, based on several factors. Among them are the drink's "dryness", the starter used in its production, and the production method.

=== Baijiu ===
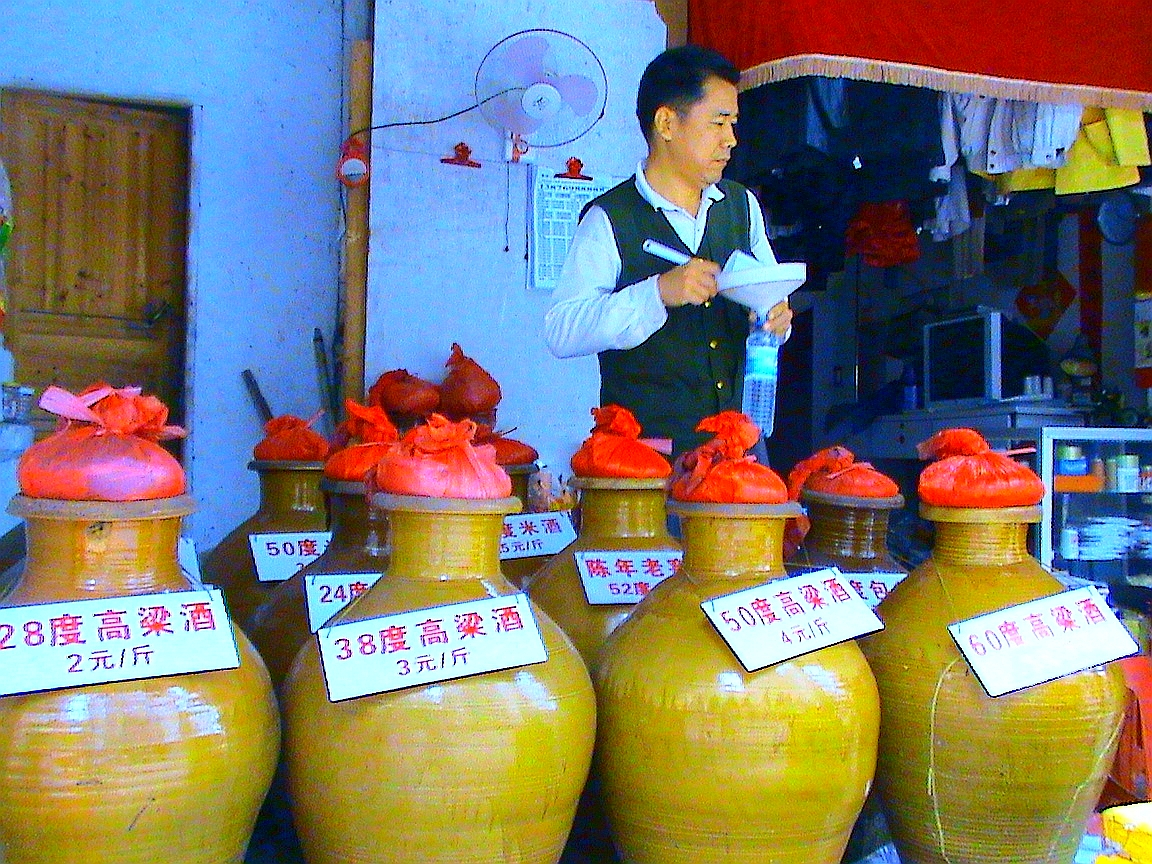
Locally produced crockery jars of baijiu in a liquor store in Haikou on Hainan, with signs indicating the alcohol content and price per jin (1/2 kilo).

Baijiu or shaojiu is a Chinese liquor. It is usually sorghum-based, but some varieties are distilled from huangjiu or other rice-based drinks. All typically have an alcohol content greater than 30% and are so similar in color and feel to vodka that baijiu is sometimes known as "Chinese vodka". There are many varieties, classified by their fragrance, but most are only distilled once, permitting stronger flavors and scent than vodka. The prestige brand within China is the "sauce-scented" Moutai or Mao-t'ai, produced in the southern city of Maotai in Guizhou. More common brands include Luzhou Laojiao, Wuliangye and varieties of erguotou.

=== Beer ===
Modern Chinese beers derive from the Russian and German breweries established at Harbin and Qingdao. Most are pale lagers, although other styles are available, particularly in brewpubs catering to the expatriate communities in Beijing and Shanghai.

The principal Chinese brands are Tsingtao, Harbin, and Snow. Other major brewers include Yanjing, San Miguel, Zhujiang, and Reeb.

=== Wine ===
Domestic production within China is dominated by a few large vineyards, including Changyu Pioneer Wine, China Great Wall Wine, and Dynasty Wine Notable regions include Yantai, Beijing, Zhangjiakou in Hebei, Yibin in Sichuan, Tonghua in Jilin, Taiyuan in Shanxi, and Ningxia. Yantai alone holds over 140 wineries and produces 40% of the country's wine.

Traditional Uyghur wine from Xinjiang is known as museles (Arabic: المثلث, lit. "the triangle"). Its production requires crushing the grapes by hand, then straining them through atlas silk and boiling the juice with an equal volume of water, as well as added sugar. This is cooked until the original volume of the juice is reached and then stored in clay urns along with various flavorings.

A controversial drink that is still nowadays sold in the black market of the country is Tiger Bone Wine: this tonic is created crushing and mixing the bones with rice wine, in a long process that lasts for at least eight years. The drink has a high alcohol concentration, of about 58% and is used in both traditional Chinese Medicine and Martial Arts, and has been on the market for centuries.

=== Other ===
Other fermented beverages include choujiu (made from sticky rice), lychee wine, gouqi jiu (made from wolfberries), Qingke jiu (made from Tibetan highland barley), and kumis (made from mare or yak milk). The peach-scented Luzhou Laojiao prides itself on continuous production since 1573 during the Ming dynasty. The ginger-flavored liqueur Canton is no longer produced in China but is instead imported for consumption in the United States from a distillery in France unrelated to its original production.

Whisky demand is on the rise in China, but domestically produced whisky is limited.

== Culture ==
Chinese alcoholic beverages have a long history both as a part of diet and ceremonies (both secular and religious), as well as being a part of the productive activities of many households and commercial establishments.

=== Cuisine ===
Chinese alcoholic beverages were traditionally warmed before being consumed, a practice going back to the early dynastic period. The temperature to which the liquor may be warmed ranges between approximately 35 and 55 °C, well below the boiling point of ethanol (about 78 or 79 °C). Warming the liquor allows its aromas to be better appreciated by the drinker without losing too much alcohol. The optimal temperature for warming depends on the type of beverage as well as the preference of the drinker.

Traditionally, also, the drinks are consumed together with food rather than on their own. Neither practice is binding in modern China.

In addition to being used to brew liquor, the seed mash described above can also be made to be eaten or drunk as a sweet dessert.

=== Medicine ===
Traditional Chinese medicine frequently employed alcoholic drinks (associated with yin energy) and alcoholic drinks were likewise used as medicine. Alcohol including extracts of plants, herbs, animal parts, or minerals are not as common as they once were but may still be encountered. One example of such a medicinal alcoholic drink is realgar wine: consumed during the Dragon Boat Festival, realgar wine consisted of huangjiu mixed with realgar, an arsenic sulfide also used as an insecticide. It appears in the Chinese legend of the White Snake as the substance which forces the snake to reveal her true form. The drink was thought to prevent disease and misfortune (particularly snake bites and digestive worms) and to promote health; although modern Chinese authorities discourage the practice, it is still legally available for consumption.

== Vessels ==
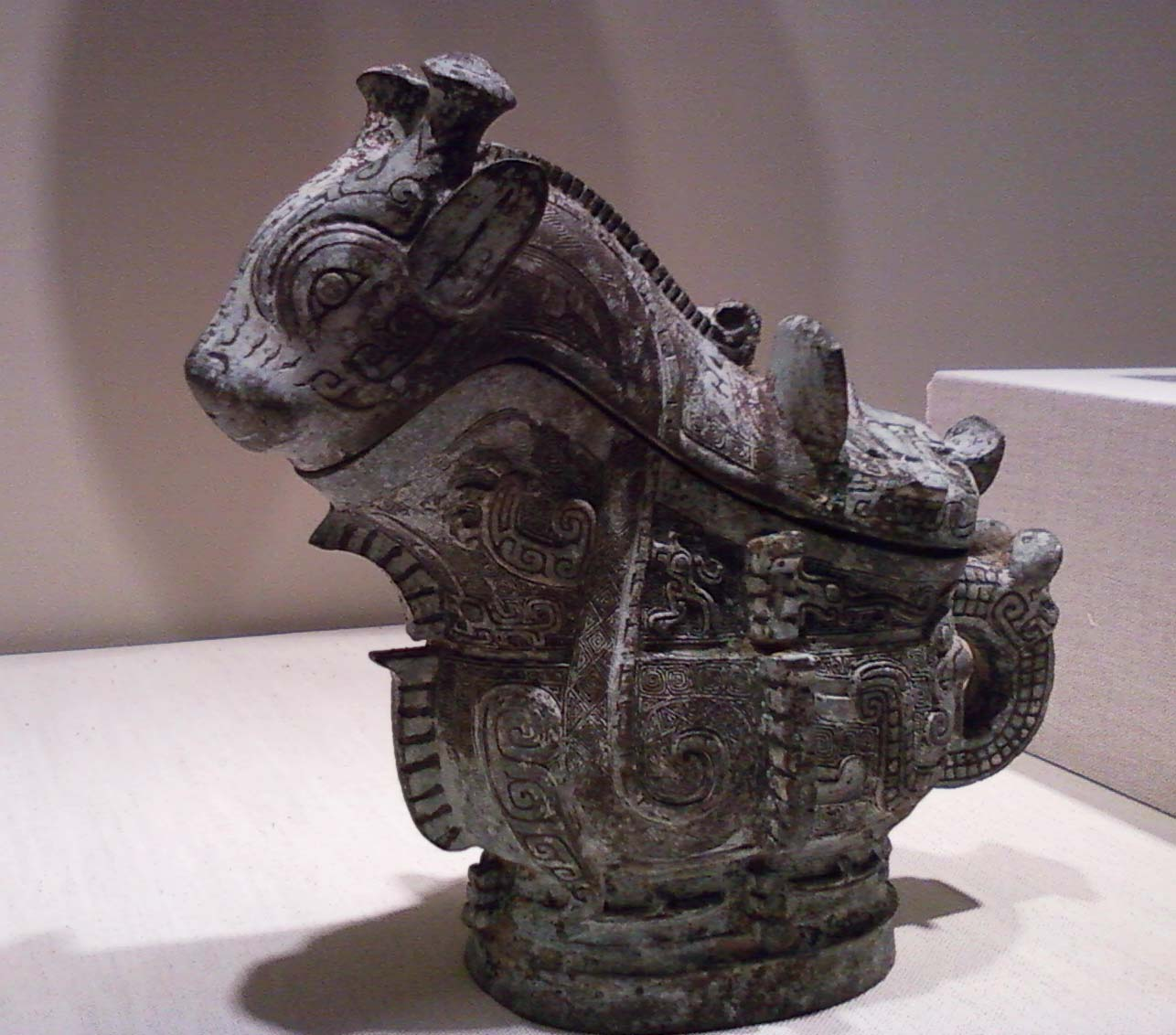
Ritual wine server (guang), Indianapolis. Cast bronze. Shang dynasty.

Alcohol in China is intimately associated with the various vessels or implements associated with fermentation, production, storing or aging vessels of such beverages. This is noteworthy in various ways.

Vessels of various types from neolithic ceramic culture have been excavated. A great boon to modern research is that the natural pores in the clay absorbed and preserved traces of liquids which had been contained in these vessels. By extraction with solvents and subsequent laboratory analysis researchers have discovered much about these liquid contents from long ago. It turns out that some of these contents were alcoholic drinks, which in the case of some archeological sites such as Jiahu appears to have been fairly common.

Numerous bronze age vessels also survive from China ancient dynastic China. An interesting question is to what extent ancient elites may have been poisoning themselves due to the presence of up to 20% free lead in some of the common alloys used for casting. The bronze vessels are of enormous interest as artifactual evidence of the intersection of the role of alcohol in the rites and rituals of ancient Chinese society.

== See also ==
- Alcohol flush reaction
- Chinese cuisine
- Eight Immortals of the Wine Cup
- History of wine#Ancient China (section on wine in ancient China)
- Jiuniang, a mildly-alcoholic sticky-rice porridge
- Non-grape-based wine
- List of rice wines
- Shaoxing wine (a regional yellow wine)
- Snake Wine
- Shōchū
- Soju
- Toso, túsū, in Pinyin
- Zhang Qian
