= Jing-A Brewing Co. =

Chinese microbrewery

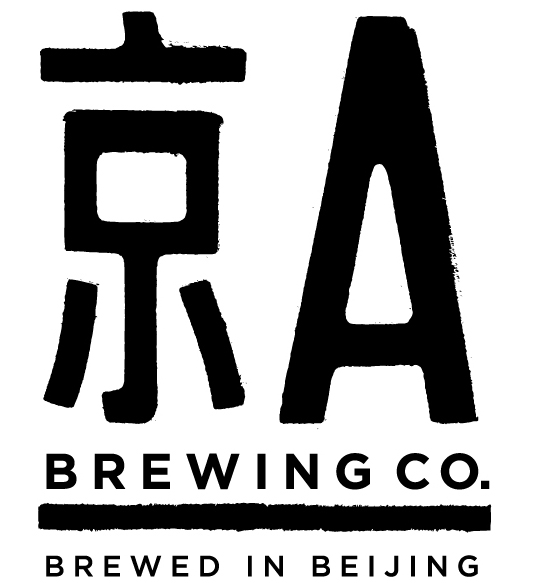
- Industry: Alcoholic beverage
- Founded: 2012
- Founders: Alex Acker, Kristian Li
- Headquarters: Beijing, China, China
- Products: Beer
- Website: jingabrewing.com

Jing-A Brewing Co. (simplified Chinese: 京A精酿啤酒; traditional Chinese: 京A精釀啤酒; pinyin: Jīng A jīng niáng píjiǔ) is a microbrewery founded in 2012 in Beijing. The brewery is known for its use of Chinese ingredients such as red rice koji, ginger, and Sichuan peppercorn, and its interpretations of traditional beer styles such as IPA, witbier, and stout. Since 2014, the company has operated a taproom in Sanlitun, a popular nightlife area for both foreigners and locals.

== History ==
The brewery began as a homebrewing project between Alex Acker and Kristian Li, two North American expatriates who had been living in Beijing since 2000. The two brewed increasingly large batches of homebrew for their friends while entertaining the thought of eventually turning their hobby into a business. In these early years, they also developed a reputation for using their beer to hold pop-up parties, such as the election-watching party in 2012 for which they made a beer based on Barack Obama's White House Honey Brown Ale.

After various moves to scale up their brewing in restaurant kitchens and on borrowed equipment, in early 2013, Acker and Li invested in building the first small professional-grade brewery for Jing-A, with a monthly production of 5000L, inside a bistro in Beijing's embassy district.

== Beer List ==
=== Core Beers ===
Beer	% ABV	IBU	Description
Flying Fist IPA	6.5	50	IPA
Mandarin Wheat	4.8	15	Belgian wit with local mandarin orange and coriander seed
Worker's Pale Ale	5.0	30	Pale ale
Koji Red Ale	5.5	15	Ale with Koji sake rice, wasabi root, and ginger
Full Moon Farmhouse Ale	6.2	20	Belgian saison with osmanthus flower
Black Velvet Vanilla Stout	6.2	15	Stout with chocolate, coffee, and roasted flavors
Airpocalypse Double IPA	8.8	N/A	Double IPA
Tuhao Gold Pilsner	5.0	28	Bohemian pilsner

=== Seasonal Beers ===
Beer	% ABV	IBU	Availability	Description
Lucky 8 Lager	6.5	50	Winter/Spring	India pale lager
Beijing Bikini Watermelon Wheat	4.5	15	Summer	Wheat beer with local watermelons
Über-Jing Oktoberfest Lager	6.5	25	Early Fall	Lager
Guizhou Smoked Chili Porter	5.5	25	Fall/Winter	Beechwood smoked malt and chili peppers from Guizhou
Toasted Chestnut Brown Ale	5.6	30	Fall/Winter	Brown ale with caramel notes and roasted chestnuts
Monster Mash Pumpkin Ale	8.8	20	Fall	Pumpkin ale

=== Collaboration Beers ===
Beer	% ABV	IBU	Collaborator	Description
Pomegranate Beijinger Weisse	5.6	10	10 Barrel Brewing; Elysian Brewing	Wheat ale with pomegranate juice and hibiscus
Imperial Stormtrooper Stout	7.4	52		Stout with Carafa 3 and roasted barley
Eightfold Path Imperial Stout	8.6	65	10 Barrel Brewing; Elysian Brewing	Stout with 8 different malts
Nine Rivers Imperial Chestnut Ale	8.6	40	Norwegian brewmaster, Kjetil Jikiun	
Beijing Miracle	4.44	24	Great Leap Brewing; Slow Boat Brewery; NBeer; Panda Brew; Arrow Factory Brewing	Belgian pale ale
Imperial Koji Saison	14.0	25	Norweign brewmaster, Kjetil Jikiun; Nøgne Ø	Imperial saison with koji, Chinese orange peel, saison/sake yeast blend
Hutong Clan CDA	9.0	75	Boneyard Beer	Cascadian dark ale
One Beer Two Systems	5.8	25	Moonzen Brewery	
Emperor's Horses	5.3	30	Boxing Cat Brewery	Pilsner with New Zealand hops and lychee fruit
Frenchie's Mom Summer Saison	6.4	22	The Brew	French-style saison

== See also ==
- Beer in China
- Chaoyang District, Beijing
- List of microbreweries
