= Slow Boat Brewery =

Microbrewery in Beijing, China

- Type: Private
- Industry: Brewery
- Founder: Chandler Jurinka, Daniel Hebert
- Headquarters: Chaoyang District, Beijing, China
- Products: Craft beer
- Website: www.slowboatbrewery.com

Slow Boat Brewery (simplified Chinese: 悠航鲜啤; traditional Chinese: 悠航鮮啤; pinyin: Yōu háng xiān pí) is a microbrewery located in Chaoyang District, Beijing, China. Since 2016, the company has operated a brewpub in Sanlitun. In December 2018, Slow Boat Brewery announced plans to open a second location at Dengshikou in Beijing. It is listed among the three major craft breweries in Beijing, including Jing-A Brewing Co., and Great Leap Brewing.

== History ==
Slow Boat Brewery was founded by Chandler Jurinka and Daniel Hebert in 2011 as a pilot brewery in the mountains outside of Beijing. Their first taproom was opened on Dongsi Batiao in December 2012. In 2014 and 2015, Slow Boat Brewery hosted the largest gathering of Chinese craft brewers at the Beijing Autumn Craft Beer Festival. In September 2016, they opened a larger three-floor brewpub in Sanlitun. The original taproom was closed in May 2017 during a citywide reconstruction campaign.

Slow Boat Brewery brews onsite at their brewpub in Sanlitun and at a production facility outside of Beijing, producing around 440,000 U.S. pints annually. In 2017, it became one of China's biggest craft brewers by production capacity, as well as one of the biggest brewpubs in Beijing. Slow Boat Brewpub, located across from the Topwin Center in Sanlitun, offers 20 types of beer across 36 taps with an annual brewing capacity of 550,000 pints (2,200 barrels). Popular beers include its flagship Monkey's Fist IPA and seasonal Slutty Mermaid Triple IPA.

== Awards ==
2014 -

- That's Beijing Golden Fork Awards: Best Burger

2015 -

- The Beijinger 2015 Burger Cup: Beijing's Best Burger

2016 -

- The Beijinger 2016 Burger Cup: Beijing's Best Burger

2018 -

- Global ‘Beer Joint Of The Day’ Award
- The Beijinger 2018 Burger Cup: Beijing's Best Burger
- International Beer Cup 2018 Silver Medal in American-Style India Pale Ale: Moon Jelly Clear New England IPA
- International Beer Cup 2018 Silver Medal in Other International Style Lagers: Stone Boat Pilsner

== See also ==
- Beer in China
- List of microbreweries
