= Roads of Tang Poetry =

Roads of Tang Poetry (simplified Chinese: 唐诗之路; traditional Chinese: 唐詩之路; pinyin: Tángshī Zhīlù) refers to two cultural belts in Zhejiang Province, China. According to the provincial government, one of the two roads stretches along the Qiantang River, and the other is located in eastern Zhejiang.

== Description ==
Tang poetry refers to poetry written in or around the time of or in the characteristic style of China's Tang dynasty (618–907), which is often considered as the Golden Age of Chinese poetry. The two belts were named as Roads of Tang Poetry because over 448 poets out of around 2200 of Complete Tang Poems have visited the place, including such well-known poets as Li Bai, Du Fu and He Zhizhang.

== Researches ==
As a strong advocate of this concept, Zhu Yuebing, established the Xinchang Institute of East-Zhejiang Road of Tang Poetry based in Xinchang County, China. In 2018, the China National Symposium on Road of Tang Poetry and Tianmushan (全国唐诗之路与天姥山学术研讨会) was held.
