= NBA digital marketing =

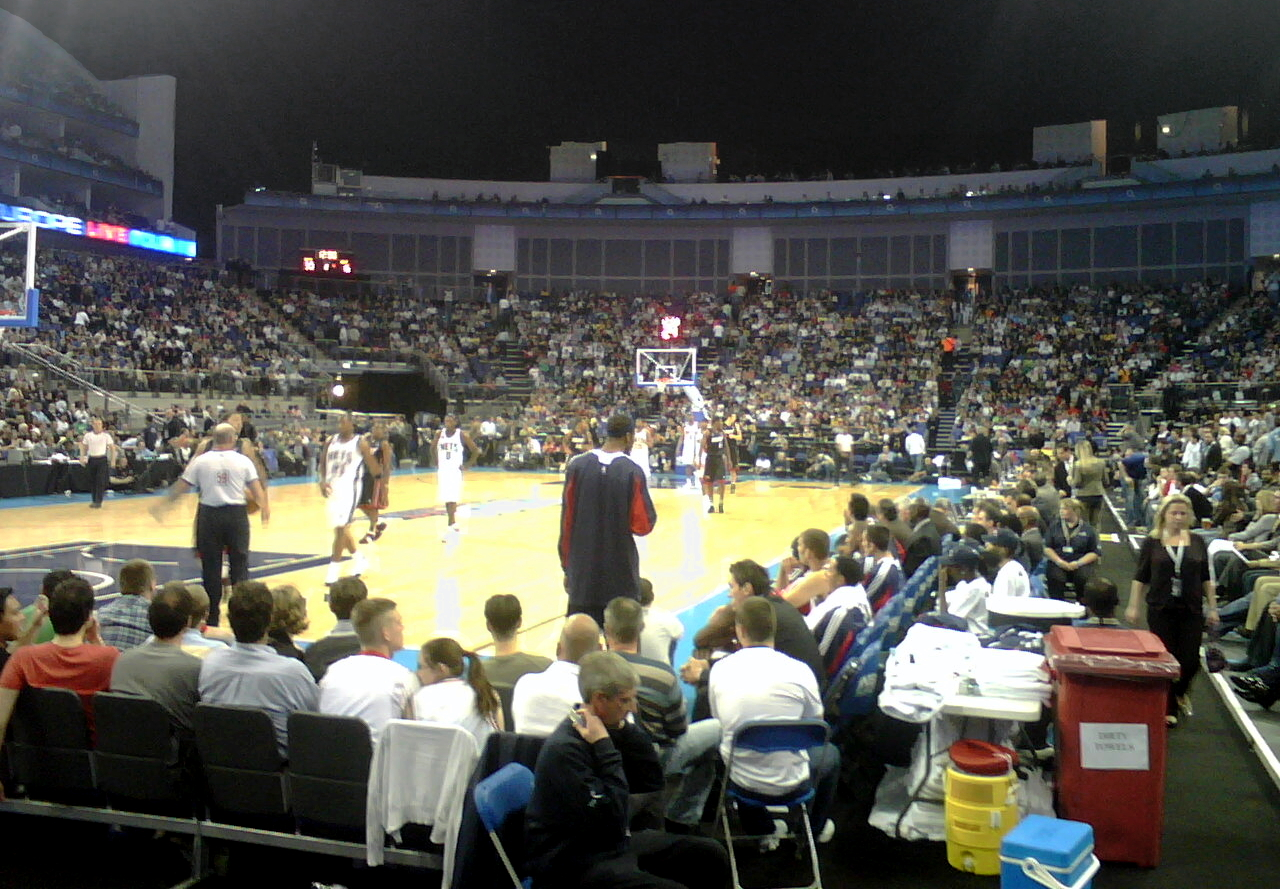
London NBA 2008

The National Basketball Association (NBA) is one of the fastest growing sports leagues in the United States. In 2017, NBA broadcast game ratings had increased by 32% since the previous season, the 2017 NBA Finals had 20.4 million total viewers with an additional 434,000 digital streaming viewers in 215 countries and territories, in 49 languages. The growth of NBA viewership is related to its path to globalization and their digital marketing campaigns, which has allowed the NBA to expand their brand awareness and sponsorship deals across borders. The NBA started its globalization strategy by holding international exhibition games between NBA teams and international teams in different countries, as well as inviting over 110 international players to join the league.

== NBA Digital ==
=== NBA Social Media ===
Online Social Networks (OSNs), which provide high-quality information, can offer users a better understanding of the brand, and provide support among a community of users. The NBA has a powerful digital presence, with a huge number of followers among different social media channels including Facebook, Twitter, Instagram, YouTube, Snapchat and Reddit, etc. The NBA was first official professional sports league to partner with YouTube, launching its own channel on platform in 2005. In 2018, Twitter declared that the NBA was the most tweeted-about sports league, above the NFL and MLB. The content on these social platform are diverse, varied, and engaging; Facebook users are able to ask NBA players questions through the Live Video platform, Twitter offers in-game video highlights when users click the hashtag #NBARapidReplay, and the number of Facebook fans and Twitter followers of the NBA is still growing. With high-quality information, the audience can receive and retain updates on every basketball game, enticing fans to keep a watchful eye on future games and matchups between their favorite teams. High-quality information also benefits users who wish to obtain information related to a service or product. For example, fans may purchase an NBA League Pass for access to every NBA game on their TV, computer, smartphone, or other Internet-connected device. NBA fans can also engage in E-Commerce, shopping at the online NBA Store for their favorite player's jersey or team gear.

NBA Social Media Audience Size (as of December 19, 2018)
Social Media Platform	Followers/Likes
Facebook	36.8 million
Instagram	33.1 million
Twitter	27.5 million

=== Corporate Sponsors and Partners ===
The motivations and objectives of corporate sponsors and partners include using sport leagues as a versatile medium to reach a wide range of audiences as well as achieving several business objectives, including enhancing brand awareness, promoting sales, building business relationship, advocating for community relations, and for personal interest. Some businesses also engage with corporate sponsors and partners as a marketing tool to explore the B2B market.

In 2013, NBA started its high-profile marketing campaign with various corporate sponsors and partners; the NBA signed with four major entertainment companies: Warner Bros., Universal Pictures, Sony and The Walt Disney Company to produce co-promotional spots advertising each movie studios' upcoming films during the 2013 NBA Playoffs and 2013 NBA Finals. The NBA has also partnered with brands in other industries, like Sprint and Taco Bell.

A variety of advertisements are placed inside NBA arenas for visibility during broadcast games and for in-person attendees. For example, PepsiCo and Harbin Brewery have placed their respective company logos on the court.

=== Celebrities and Influencers ===
Celebrities enjoy public recognition and often are perceived to possess some expertise. Celebrities actively participate in NBA games, especially when it comes to All-Star Weekend. Every year, the NBA invites celebrities like Justin Bieber, Jerry Ferrara, Brandon Armstrong to participate in the NBA All-Star Celebrity Game. The NBA leverages the fan bases and online following of these celebrities and influencers to drive its own digital presence.

Celebrities are also frequently spotted attending NBA games. A celebrity attending an NBA game can generate a lot of press. For example, David Beckham received attention for attending Kobe Bryant's last game.
