= Yidi =

Yidi may refer to:

- Yidi (god) (仪狄, a brewer credited with the invention of alcohol during the reign of Yu the Great
- Wang Yidi (born 1997), Chinese table tennis player
- Yidi (夷狄), another name for the traditional 4 groups of barbarians in ancient China
- Yidi (毅帝), the short posthumous name of the Zhengde Emperor of the Ming Dynasty
- Yidi (義帝), the short posthumous name of the Tongzhi Emperor of the Qing Dynasty
