= Chen Fashu =

- Born: 1961 or 1962 (age 64–65); China
- Education: China Europe International Business School
- Occupations: Chairman, New Huada Group
- Spouse: married
- Children: 4

Chen Fashu (Chinese: 陈发树; born 1961) is a Chinese billionaire businessman, chairman of New Huada Group, a Chinese mining company.

He was born in Fujian province, and graduated from China Europe International Business School.

As of July 2018, Forbes estimated his net worth at US$2.8 billion.

On May 9, 2009 Anheuser-Busch InBev sold its remaining 7% of Tsingtao Brewery to Chen Fashu for $235 million.

He is married, with four children, and lives in Fuzhou.
