= Beer in China =

- Simplified Chinese: 中国啤酒
- Traditional Chinese: 中國啤酒
Transcriptions
Standard Mandarin
- Hanyu Pinyin: Zhōngguó píjiǔ

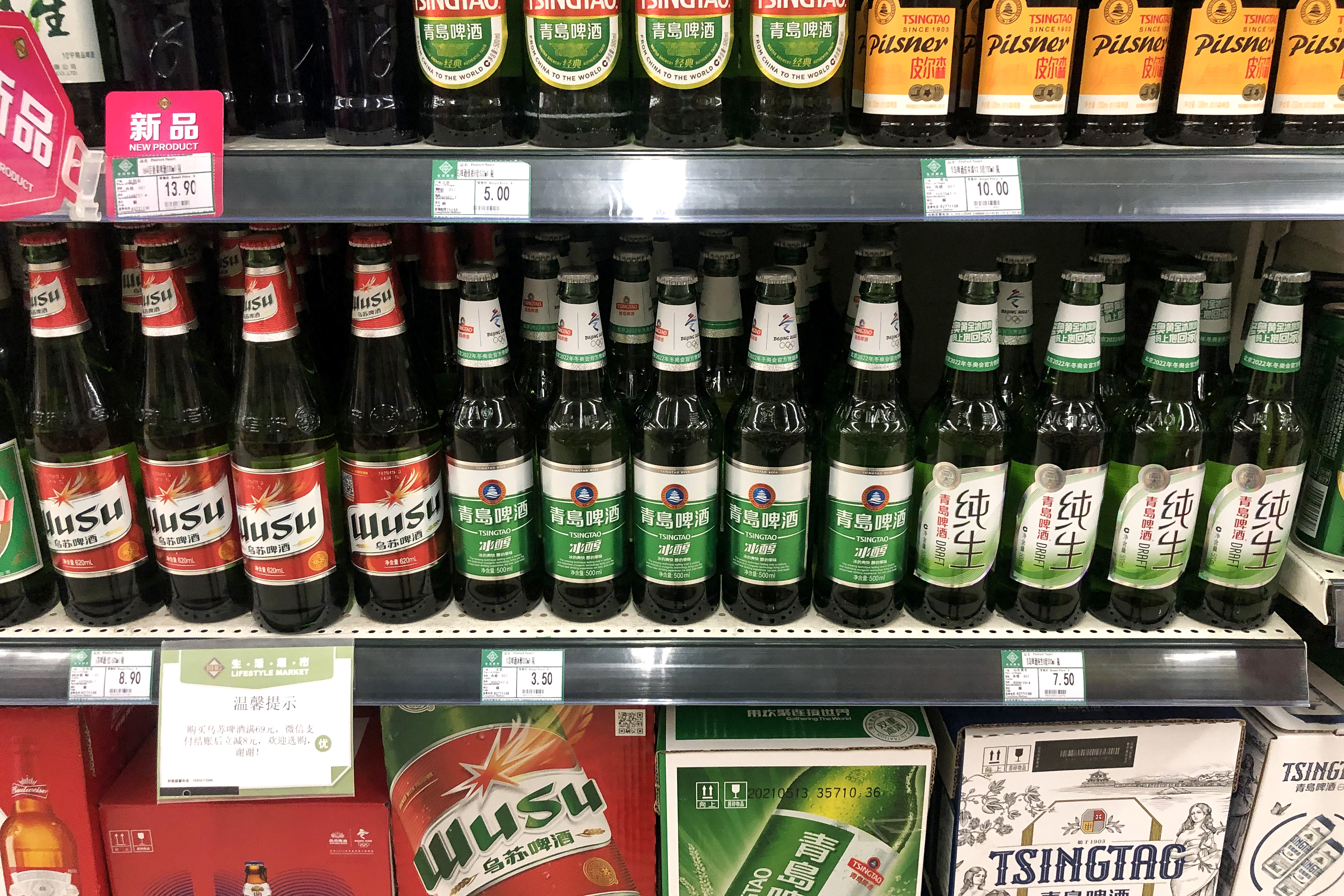
A selection of beer at a supermarket in Beijing

Beer was the dominant alcoholic beverage in China through the Han dynasty, after which it was eclipsed by rice wine. Modern brewing appeared in the late 19th century, brought to China by Europeans who brewed pale lagers, such as Tsingtao. Both beer production and consumption of local and imported brands grew increasingly popular in the 20th century. In the 21st century, China became the world's largest consumer of beer, commercial scale brewing expanded, and craft beer began to spread beyond expatriate communities and make inroads amongst the Chinese population.

== History ==
Production and consumption of beer in China has occurred for around nine thousand years, with recent archaeological findings showing that Chinese villagers were brewing beer-type alcoholic drinks as far back as 7000 BC on small and individual scales. Made with rice, honey, grape, and hawthorn fruits, this early beer seems to have been produced similarly to that of ancient Egypt and Mesopotamia. Ancient Chinese beer was important in ancestral worship, funeral and other rituals of Xia, Shang and Zhou dynasties, and the beer was called as Lao Li (醪醴 in oracle bone script). However, after the Han dynasty, Chinese beer faded from prominence in favor of huangjiu, which remained the case for the next two millennia.

Archaeologists uncovered ancient beer brewing equipment in an underground room built between 3400 and 2900 BC in China. A research report published in the Proceedings of the National Academy of Sciences of the United States of America said that the Mijiaya Site provided the earliest evidence of beer-making in China, indicating that people had mastered the beer brewing technology around 5,000 years ago.

=== Pale lager ===
Modern beer brewing was not introduced into China until the end of 19th century, when Polish people established a brewery in Harbin, with another three following (also in Harbin), set up by Germans, Czechoslovaks and Poles respectively. Japanese also established in 1934 in Mukden Manchurian Beer, which later became Shenyang Snow Beer and then acquired in 1994 by China Resources Enterprises.

=== Craft beer ===
The emergence of craft beer in China started in the large metro areas including Beijing, Shanghai and Guangzhou. Once primarily of interest to expat drinkers, local consumer interest in premium brands and local and imported craft beers is currently on the rise. However, Chinese government regulations have been cited as an obstacle facing new breweries or those wishing to expand bottling distribution.

== Ingredients ==
Chinese beers often contain rice, sorghum and sometimes rye in addition to barley. Some beer is produced that uses bitter melon instead of hops as the bittering agent.

Chinese media reported in 2001 that as many as 95% of all Chinese beers contained formaldehyde, to prevent sedimentation in bottles and cans while in storage.

== Economy ==
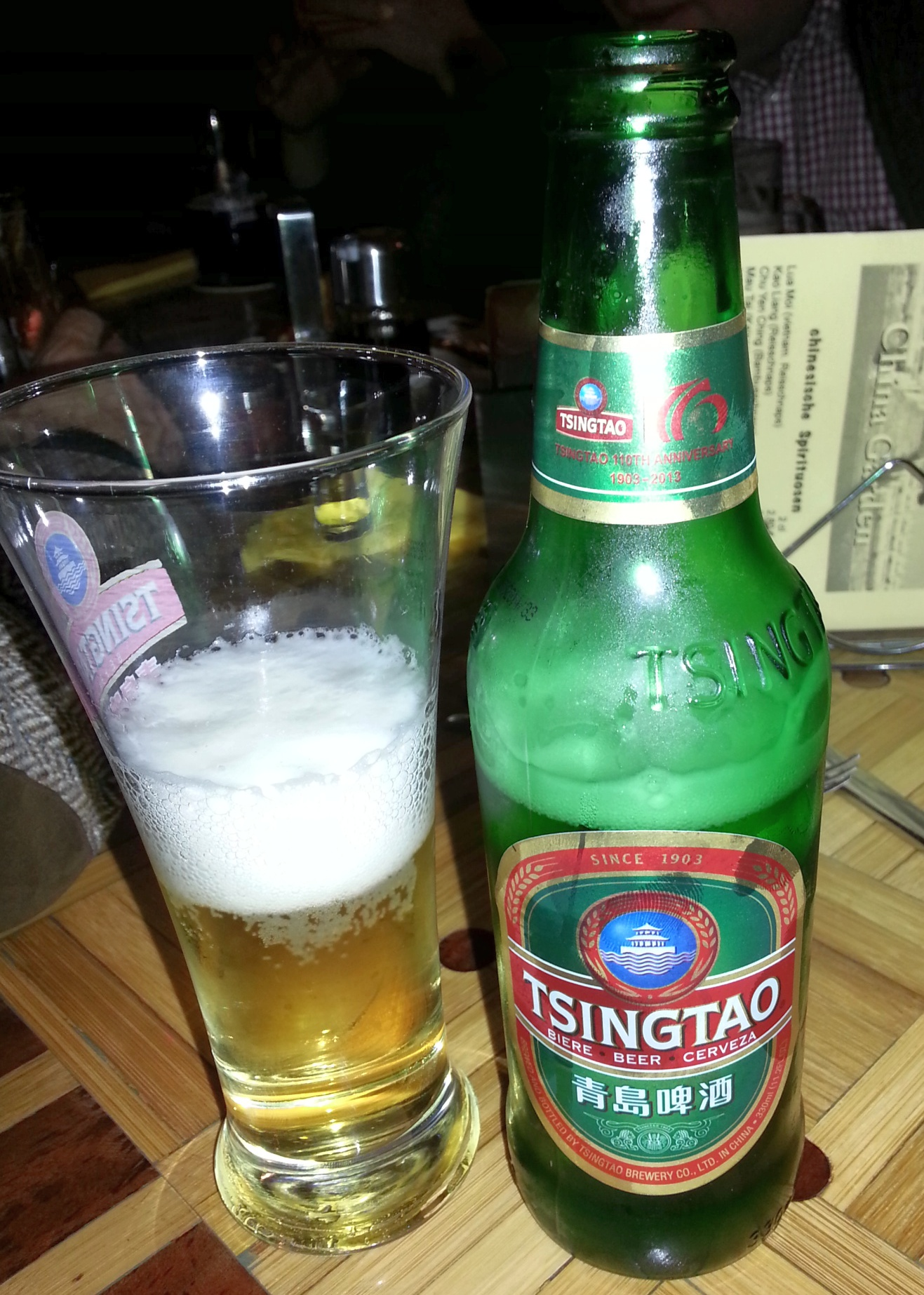
Chinese Tsingtao beer

Despite the fact that estimates say between one-third to half of East Asian people, including Chinese people, have Asian flush syndrome, which influences the ability to process alcohol, China is deemed the world's largest beer market in terms of global consumption, followed by the United States and Brazil.

Snow Beer, produced by CR Snow is the best-selling beer in China, holding 21.7% market share, having recently overtaken Tsingtao Beer, produced by Tsingtao Brewery, which is the brand most widely exported to other countries. Tsingtao Beer is brewed in the city of Qingdao (formerly spelled Tsingtao in EFEO Chinese transcription) which was a German base in the time of unequal treaties and late-colonial western influence in China. The Germans needed beer for their sailors, soldiers and traders, and production continued after they lost the city to the Japanese in World War I.

Apart from Tsingtao, other major Chinese brewing groups include China Pabst Blue Ribbon, Yanjing, Sie-Tang Lio and Zhujiang Beer. Many major international brewers now have interests in, or joint ventures with, Chinese breweries, and popular international brands such as Carlsberg are now produced in China. This gives them access to the Chinese market while providing capital and expertise to help upgrade local brewing standards, albeit at the cost of variety.

Beer is brewed in Hong Kong, which has a large brewery owned by San Miguel Corporation of the Philippines, as well as a microbrewery producing several beers for the local market.

Brewpubs are gaining popularity in China, primarily in major cities which have a resident western community, though there are a few exceptions in more remote locations like Bad Monkey Brewery in Dali Old Town, Yunnan. Shanghai Brewery, Boxing Cat Brewery, The BREW and Dr. Beer are some of the more prominent craft breweries in Shanghai. In Beijing, several craft breweries such as Great Leap Brewing, Jing-A Brewing, Panda Brew Pub, and Slow Boat Brewery have become staples in the local nightlife scene. Another popular brewpub is Kaiwei Beer House, a chain based in Wuhan. Craft beer festivals have been popularized since the early 2010s in Beijing and Shanghai. Two popular beer festivals in Shanghai, Shanghai International Beer Festival and Shanghai Beer Week, were both started in 2012.

In 2015 market share of imported beer reached 1.14% and volume increased by 58.9% to 538.5 million litres.

== List of major Chinese beers ==
Note: This is a partial list of China's major breweries. The vast majority of China's breweries serve only their local vicinity.

- Gleckes Beer (格力森啤酒)-北京格力森酒业有限公司
- Hangzhou Qiandaohu (杭州千岛湖啤酒有限公司) - producer of Cheerday Beer
- Harbin Beer (哈尔滨啤酒)
- Reeb (力波啤酒)
- Snow beer (雪花啤酒)
- Tsingtao Beer (青岛啤酒)
- Beijing Yanjing Beer (燕京啤酒)
- Zhujiang Beer (珠江啤酒)
- China Pabst Blue Ribbon (蓝带啤酒)
- Wusu Beer (乌苏啤酒) Xinjiang
- Kingway Beer (金威啤酒)
- Lushan Beer (庐山啤酒)
- Shangri-La Beer (香格里拉啤酒)

== Non-alcoholic beer ==
There is a growing consumer inclination towards less strong beer in China as health conscious individuals are seeking wholesome and lower caloric options in their choice of beer, and consumers who want low alcohol and healthier drinks are noted to be mainly young women. According to a study by market intelligence agency Mintel, China has the highest amount of product launches of low or zero alcohol beer (below 3.5 percent ABV) in the Asia Pacific region in 2016, and over one in four (29 percent) beers launched in China in that year, were of low or non-alcoholic beers. Tsingtao Beers launched the first non-alcoholic beer in China in 2012 with its product, 'Qingdao 0.00', that is brewed from Czech hops and Australian barley.

Jonny Forsyth, a global drinks analyst of Mintel firm, stated "...(the) research indicates that Chinese consumers, in general, prefer less strong beer in terms of ABV, compared to the global market". Consumers in China tend to gravitate towards tried and trusted brands for their purchases in low or non-alcoholic beers, with big companies like Heineken and Tsingtao enjoying massive support from consumers based on sales and annual profits.

== See also ==
- List of beer and breweries by region
- Shangri-La Beer
