= Tsingtao Brewery =

Chinese brewery

Tsingtao Brewery Company Limited

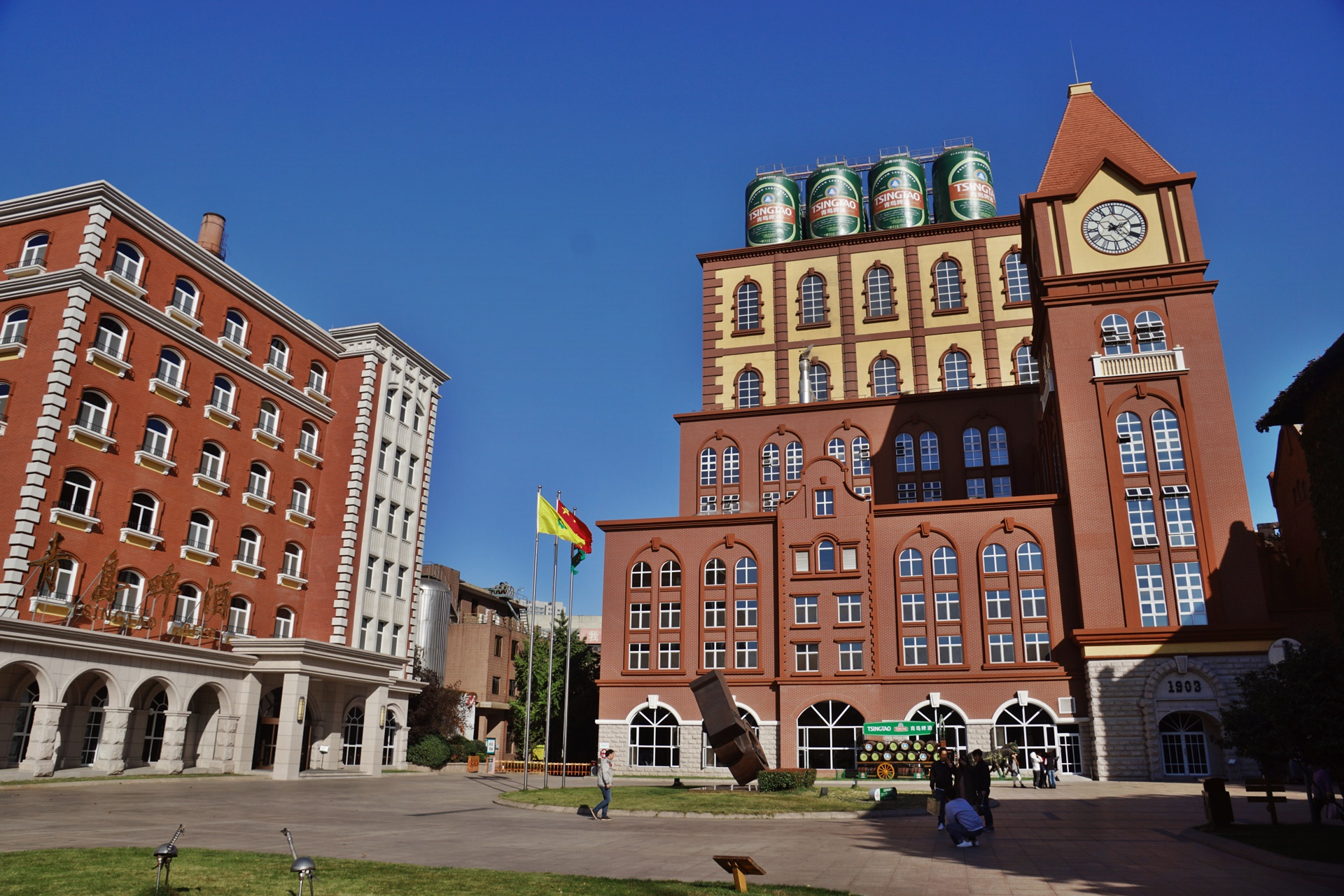
- The Tsingtao Brewery museum in Qingdao
- Native name: 青岛啤酒股份公司
- Type: Public
- Traded as: SSE: 600600; SEHK: 168
- Founded: 1903; 123 years ago
- Headquarters: Qingdao, Shandong, China
- Key people: Jiang Zong Xiang (Chairman & President)
- Revenue: ▼CN¥32.14 billion (2024)
- Net income: ▲CN¥5.84 billion (2024)
- Total assets: ▲CN¥51.42 billion (2024)
- Total equity: ▲CN¥29.86 billion (2024)
- Website: www.tsingtao.com

Tsingtao Brewery Co. Ltd. (simplified Chinese: 青岛啤酒厂; traditional Chinese: 青島啤酒廠; pinyin: Qīngdǎo Píjiǔchǎng) is China's second largest brewery, with about 15% of domestic market share and accounts for half of China's national beer exports. The headquarters are in Qingdao.

The brewery was founded in 1903 as an Anglo–German business with the brewery under the supervision of master brewers from Germany in Tsingtao (modern-day Qingdao), Kiautschou Bay Leased Territory, a 552 km^{2} (213 sq mi) area leased by the government of China to Imperial Germany.

In 2016, Tsingtao beer was the second most consumed beer globally and had reached 2.8% share of the global beer market, after its share of the world's beer market had been steadily growing by at least 0.1 percentage points every year since 2009. In 2020, Tsingtao topped the China's Most Valuable Beer Brands list by World Brand Lab with a brand value of 179.3 billion yuan. Tsingtao is currently the sixth largest brewery in the world. Its logo displays an image of Huilan Pavilion that stands on the end of Zhanqiao Pier, located on Qingdao's southern shore.

== History ==
Tsingtao Brewery was founded by the Anglo-German Brewery Co. Ltd., an English-German joint stock company based in Hong Kong which owned it until 1916. The brewery sold beers to mainly Europeans in China. The brewery was founded on August 15, 1903, as the Germania-Brauerei Tsingtao Co., Ltd (Germania Brewery) with a paid-in capital of 400,000 Mexican silver dollars divided into 4,000 shares priced at $100 each.

Founding members of the Supervisory Board

- John Prentice, of SC Farnham, Boyd & Co., Ltd., Shanghai
- Alexander McLeod, of Gibb, Livingston & Co., Shanghai
- C. W. Wrightson, of Fearon, Daniel & Co., Shanghai
- Max Slevogt, of Slevogt & Co., Shanghai
- J. Jürgen Block, of H. Sietas & Co., Qufu

Brewery Directors

- Heinrich Seifart (1904–November 25, 1907)
- Ernst Siemssen (November 1907 – 1914)

Brewmasters

- R. Schuster (1904–05)
- Martin Wehle (1906–14)

The first beer was served on December 22, 1904.

Following the Siege of Tsingtao during World War I, Qingdao came under Japanese and British military control. On August 16, 1916, an extraordinary general meeting was held in Shanghai. Liquidators were appointed and it was decided the company would be sold to the Dai-Nippon Brewery (大日本麦酒, which in 1949 would be split into Asahi Breweries and what later became Sapporo Brewery). The Japanese military administration in Qingdao approved the liquidation on September 9, 1916. German equity was approximately 70 percent. The German share of the sales price attributable to shareholders was in the hands of the liquidators by April 2, 1921.

=== Nationalization ===
After Japan's surrender to the Allies and its retreat from China at the end of World War II, the Tsingtao Brewery was turned into a Chinese brewery under ownership of the Tsui family and the supervision of the Nationalist government in Nanjing. However, that period of ownership only lasted until 1949 when, after the Communist victory in the Chinese Civil War, the new People's Republic of China confiscated all the shares in the Tsingtao Brewery, that had previously belonged to the Tsui family, and the business became a state-owned enterprise.

=== Privatization ===
The company was privatized in the early 1990s and in 1993 merged with three other breweries in Qingdao and was finally renamed Tsingtao Brewery Company Limited. In June 1993, Tsingtao Brewery became the first Chinese firm listed on the Hong Kong Stock Exchange.

At one point 27% of the company was owned by Anheuser-Busch. The company once owned several other breweries in China, some of which also produced Tsingtao Beer.

On January 23, 2009, Anheuser-Busch InBev announced that it was selling 19.9% to Asahi Breweries for $667 million. The sale would make Asahi Breweries, Ltd. the second largest shareholder in Tsingtao behind only the Tsingtao Brewery Group. On May 9, 2009, Anheuser-Busch InBev sold its remaining 7% to Chinese tycoon Chen Fashu (陈发树) for $235 million.

In January 2017, Asahi Breweries announced that it would sell its 20 percent share in Tsingtao which it had owned since 2009; the value of this share of the company was estimated at US$1.1 billion.

== Beers ==
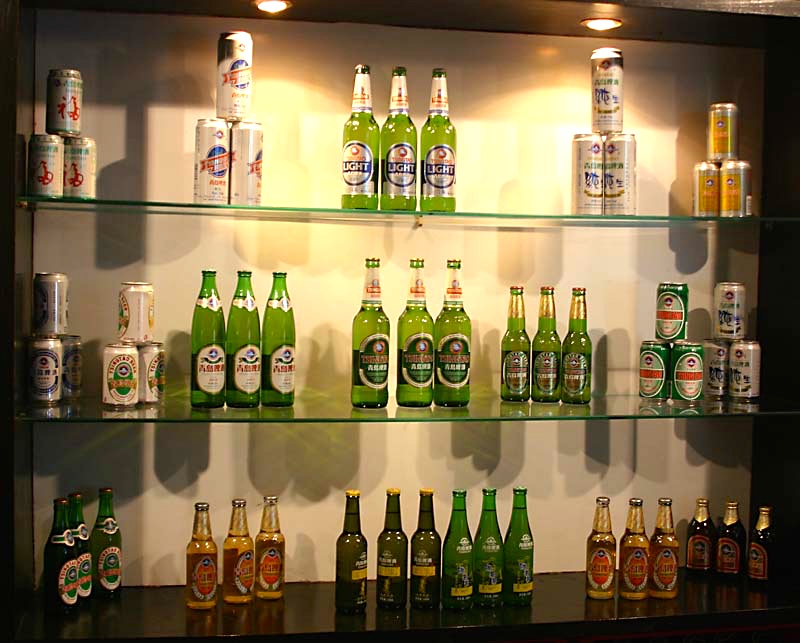
Past packaging of Tsingtao Beer

Tsingtao Beer, a well-hopped standard pale lager of 4.7% abv, is the flagship brew, accounting for most of the brewery's production. An unpasteurized version is sold as Tsingtao Draft Beer. Tsingtao Beer was long advertized as being "brewed with mineral water from the Laoshan Spring", which contributed to its characteristic flavor, but that now applies only to beer produced in Qingdao, and not to those produced in the company's other breweries.

The brewery also produces a number of other beers, mostly for the local market. Those sometimes found outside China include Tsingtao Dark Beer (5.2% abv), and more rarely Tsingtao Spirulina Green Beer, also sold as Tsingtao Green Beer, a 4.5% abv green pilsner colored by spirulina and claimed to promote good health. The alcohol content of export versions may vary slightly from those for the domestic market.

== Export orientation ==
The beer market in China was very underdeveloped in the 1980s and the brewery was forced to concentrate on overseas markets. The Chinese economic reforms in the early 1980s facilitated exportation. However, while concentrating on international markets, the brewery also attempted to sell its beer on the domestic market and competed with other domestic brands as well as foreign brands.

The main export company for the brewery was the "Good Harvest of Five Grains Corporation" based in Hong Kong. The Good Harvest of Five Grains Corporation also tried to market the beer in Hong Kong itself and later built a wholesale network consisting of up to 300 companies.

Tsingtao Beer was introduced to the United States in 1972, and soon became the top-selling Chinese beer in the U.S. market; it has maintained this leadership within the United States ever since, despite increasing competition from other well known Chinese beer brands, Zhujiang and Yanjing. As of July 2018, distribution in the UK and Ireland was handled by C&C Group PLC. The Tsingtao brand is sold in 62 countries and regions around the world, and accounts for more than 50% of China's beer exports. According to the company's financial figures from 2010, Tsingtao saw a 6.6% year-on-year revenue increase from sales to Hong Kong and other overseas markets.

== National marketing ==
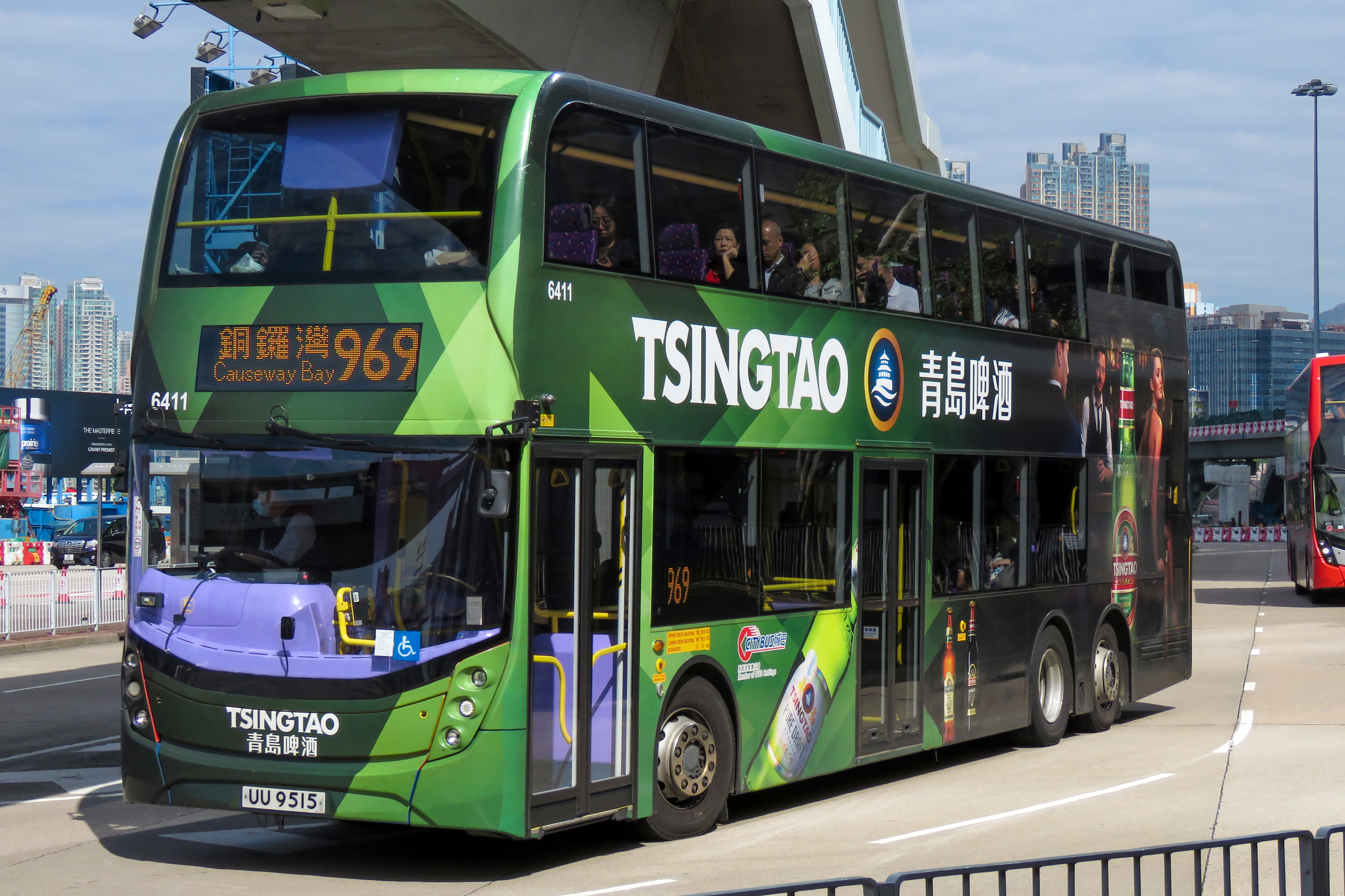
A double-decker bus with Tsingtao beer advertisement in Hong Kong.

Before the 1949 takeover by the new PRC government, the brewery had used imported raw material and water from the Laoshan mountain. With the outbreak of the Korean War and the resulting embargo of the People's Republic by the West, the brewery was forced to use domestic products, and the government encouraged peasants in Shandong to harvest the necessary raw materials (mainly hops and barley) themselves. The government used various incentives, like free seeds, to achieve this goal.

The brewery had previously used nationalistic marketing strategies, and after the switchover to production using only domestic material this nationalist marketing effort was increased. However, the brewery still maintained its international roots.

=== International Beer Festival ===
The brewery first applied for permission for a Qingdao International Beer Festival in 1991 and received approval and support from the Qingdao municipal administration, even to the extent that the city became the main sponsor. The first festival was opened on June 23, 1991, and has been held annually ever since. The festival was named "International Beer Festival" to attract foreigners as well as Chinese, although the main purpose of the festival was to make the brand more popular for domestic consumers.

The festival is usually held in late August and lasts for 14 days. During the festival, there are shows in the city and people enjoy many varieties of international beer instead of only Tsingtao. Nowadays the International Beer Festival is not meant simply to publicize the Tsingtao Brewery, but also to encourage the development of Qingdao's beer culture.

== Controversies ==
On 23 October 2023, a video of a worker urinating into a brewery tank went viral on social media.

== See also ==
- Beer and breweries in China
- Harbin Beer
- List of Chinese companies
