= Great Leap Brewing =

First microbrewery in Beijing

Great Leap Brewing 大跃啤酒
- Company logo

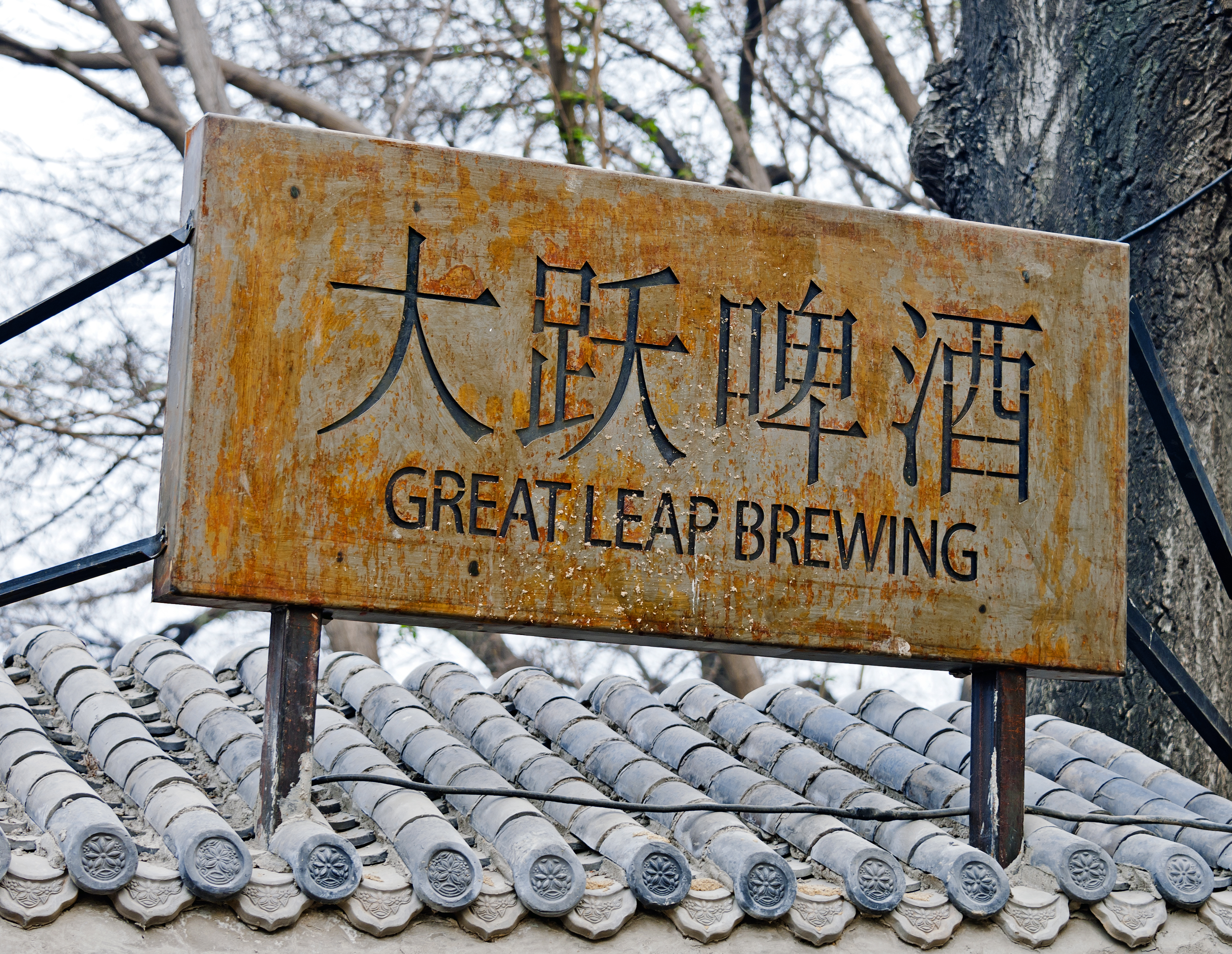
- Sign at original location
- Interactive map of Great Leap Brewing 大跃啤酒
- Type: Microbrewery
- Location: 6 Doujiao Hutong, Dongcheng District, Beijing, China
- Coordinates: 39.9361°N 116.3932°E
- Opened: October 2010
- Key people: Carl Setzer, Liu Fang
- Employees: 109
- Distribution: Beijing
- Website: http://www.greatleapbrewing.com/

Great Leap Brewing (simplified Chinese: 大跃啤酒; traditional Chinese: 大躍啤酒; pinyin: Dàyuè Píjiǔ) is a Chinese organisation operating four brewpubs in Beijing. It makes and sells a variety of beers at those locations.

After it opened in 2010, Great Leap Brewing became the first microbrewery in Beijing that specialized in craft beers with Chinese ingredients, and the longest-tenured one currently brewing. Founder Carl Setzer along with Dane Vanden Berg, another American expatriate working for an information technology company in Beijing at the time, were frustrated by the narrow choice of beers available in the city. With Liu Fang, Setzer's Chinese wife, they first began brewing in a former siheyuan on a hutong in the city's Nanluoguxiang neighborhood. The location, still open, has been described as being "one of the most difficult bars to find in Beijing".

Eventually, it expanded to two other locations and began offering a range of up to 40 beers at different times of year, with an infusion of venture capital. Setzer left his job to run Great Leap full-time in 2011.

The brewery has focused on using Chinese ingredients in its beers, including Sichuan pepper and Tieguanyin oolong tea, and branding that draws on Chinese history and culture, in a successful effort to attract Chinese consumers looking for an alternative to the country's national brands.

== History ==
=== 2004–2009: Beginnings ===
Carl Setzer, a native of Cleveland, Ohio, first came to China in 2004 after graduating from college in Alabama, at the behest of some fellow graduates doing missionary work there. He worked at Dongfeng Motor, a truck manufacturer, in the Hubei city of Shiyan, for a year. There he met and befriended Liu Fang, a Shandong native, before returning to the U.S. for graduate study at the University of Pittsburgh, after which he went to work in Taiwan.

In 2008, he returned to China, setting up the Beijing office of an American information technology firm. Setzer was disappointed with China's national beer brands like Tsingtao. He often complained about them to Dane Vandenberg, a fellow employee back in the U.S. The two realized that Beijing was an ideal market for a microbrewery, much like those that had sprung up in Setzer's native region of Northeast Ohio.

Within six months of his return to China, Setzer and Liu got married. The couple traveled to Belgium and the Netherlands, where visits to local breweries helped Liu realize that all beer did not have to taste the same. Back in China, Setzer, whose German great-grandfather had worked at a brewery in Frankfurt, began learning how to make beer, while Vanden Berg, in California, raised money from investors.

The three found an old siheyuan, or courtyard house, on Doujiao Hutong, a narrow side street in central Beijing's Dongcheng District near the Nanluoguxiang area. They began remodeling the turn-of-the-century library, part of a Qing dynasty mansion, for use as a brewpub.

Accounts of how the brewery got its name differ. Vandenberg says he came up with the name "Great Leap" for the risk he and Setzer were taking. However, a 2016 article reported that Liu's grandfather suggested it. The name carries connotations of strength in Chinese.

=== 2010: Opening ===
In October 2010, Setzer decided to open the brewery, financing it with $17,000 in savings. Using ingredients and equipment sourced domestically in order to reduce operating costs, he brewed on Sundays and opened for only the three days before that, serving from nine 20-liter (4.4 imp gal; 5.3 U.S. gal) kegs, which he recalled later seemed like a large amount at the time. The company offered four beers.

City Weekend, a newspaper for expats, gave Great Leap publicity, thanks to an intern who had attended the opening weekend. This in turn came to the notice of journalist James Fallows, who had recently returned to the U.S. after several years of reporting from China. In his blog for The Atlantic, where he had often complained about the poor quality of beer in not just China but Asia as a whole, he promised readers he would be on the next flight back to Beijing to try some of Great Leap's offerings. The existence of beer flavored with Sichuan peppercorn in particular excited him. "With that in beer, I suppose I'll never again be able to complain about bland Chinese beers."

=== 2011: Success and challenges ===
In January 2011, Setzer quit his job to work at the brewery full-time. "Everyone around me told me I was crazy," he recalled to USA Today later in the year. That spring Vanden Berg came to China to take a more active role in the business. Sales were so strong that by the summer Great Leap was converting a farmhouse in Tianxianlu, near the Mutianyu section of the Great Wall, into a brewery, using equipment better suited to large-scale industrial production, to meet demand.

Setzer continued to expand the available beers, introducing a new one each month on a seasonal basis, and making it a permanent offering if it did well. One of those beers was Iron Buddha Blonde, which uses oolong tea, an ingredient Setzer says is particularly well-suited to use in brewing, as an adjunct. The name was a play on the name of the tea variety used, tiě guānyīn (铁观音), which means "iron goddess of mercy."

Due to fallout from some of China's food safety scandals, authority for granting licenses to distribute food and drink was moved from the China Food and Drug Administration, where the brewery's application had been pending, to the General Administration of Quality Supervision, Inspection and Quarantine. The new agency gave Setzer the choice of either expediting the license for the original brewpubs, or taking the chance on the full distribution license, but with likely dire consequences if Great Leap's beer was found to be unsafe. At one point he was threatened with deportation and Liu with jail.)

They were eventually granted the license. The company prepared to increase its output drastically, to 15,000 hectoliters (13,000 US bbl). It made plans to open a second location on Xinzhong Street in the Dongzhimen neighborhood a little further from central Beijing.

=== 2012–present: Multiple locations ===
In June 2013 it opened a second location on Xinzhong Street in the Dongzhimen neighborhood. By later that year Great Leap was producing 300 kegs a month, or about 18,000 liters (4,000 imp gal; 4,800 U.S. gal). The company collaborated with Boxing Cat, a Shanghai craft brewery, to produce Yunnan Amber Ale.

In 2015 the company opened its third location, in Sanlitun, an area of the Chaoyang District near the U.S. embassy. With the three locations, Setzer had said in 2014 that he expected to be selling a million pints annually. "We're never really satisfied until Great Leap gets to the point that it's available to as many people as possible," he said. "Three strong retail locations in Beijing may accomplish this." A partnership with Germany's Drei Kronen was also expected to help.

== Facilities ==
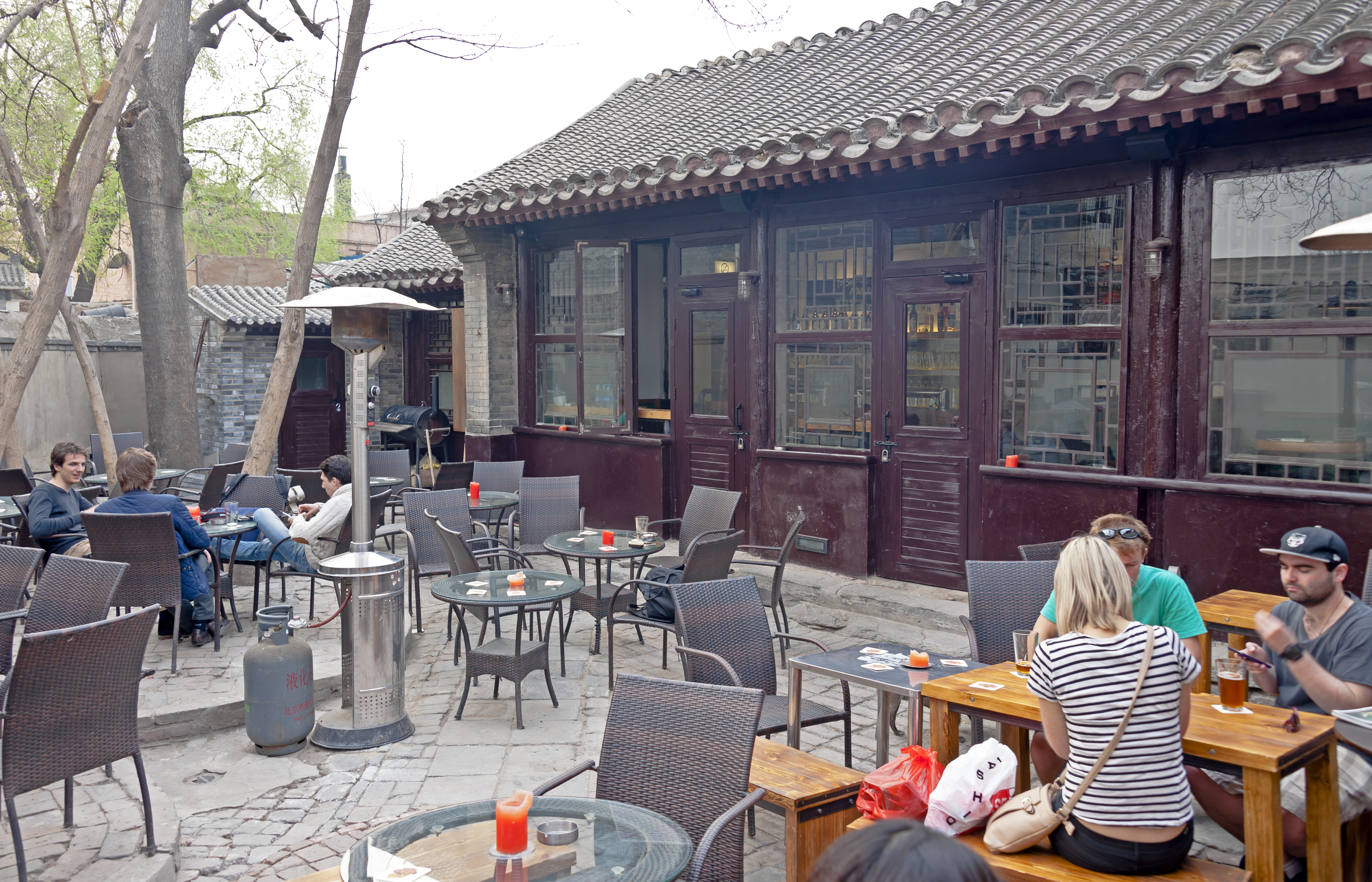
Original location

Great Leap has four retail outlets at which its beers can be purchased for consumption on or off premises. The oldest, the company's original location, is on Doujiao Hutong in the Dongcheng District near the Bell and Drum Tower and south of the Nanluoguxiang neighborhood. It is a renovated siheyuan, or courtyard house, built to serve as a private library during the final years of the Qing dynasty at the beginning of the 20th century.

Three other brewpubs are located further to the east, keeping later hours as they are not located in residential areas. Beyond the Second Ring Road but still in Dongcheng, in the Dongzhimen area, is the company's second location on Xinzhong Street. It has more of the features of a typical bar and serves more food. It was Great Leap's first location to have a full-service kitchen, serving cheeseburgers, sandwiches and salads in addition to a fuller array of bar snacks. The Sanlitun brewpub, close to the U.S. embassy in the Chaoyang District, is at 530 square metres (5,700 sq ft) the largest such facility in mainland China. It has three 2,500-liter (660 U.S. gal) fermentation tanks, producing Great Leap's three best-selling brands. The kitchen here specializes in New York-style pizza.

A fourth Great Leap location, GLB LIDO - a thirty tap taproom - opened December 2018 at the Nuo Center, Jingtai Road, Chaoyang.

In June 2019, Great Leap began production at its brand new 500,000hL per annum capacity brewery in the Xiqing Development Zone, Tianjin.

== See also ==
- Beer in China
- List of companies of China
