= Li Shizhi =

Chinese Tang dynasty poet and politician

Li Shizhi (simplified Chinese: 李适之; traditional Chinese: 李適之; pinyin: Lǐ Shìzhī; Wade–Giles: Li Shih-chih; 694 - 747), né Li Chang (李昌), formally the Duke of Qinghe (清和公), was a Chinese poet and politician during the Tang dynasty, serving as a chancellor during the reign of Emperor Xuanzong. He was known as one of the Eight Immortals of the Wine Cup due to his ability to drink a large amount of wine without becoming drunk.

== Background ==
Li Shizhi was born in 694, late in his father Li Xiang's life. His grandfather was Li Chengqian, the eldest son and original crown prince of Tang dynasty's second emperor Emperor Taizong. Li Chengqian was deposed in 643 but spared, and his line was bypassed in the subsequent succession, which eventually went to his brother Li Zhi (Emperor Gaozong). Li Shizhi's father Li Xiang (李象) served as a prefectural secretary general during the reign of Emperor Gaozong's wife Wu Zetian, but was removed by her. Li Shizhi himself started his public service as an officer of the imperial guards during the second reign of Emperor Gaozong's son (and thus his cousin) Emperor Zhongzong.

== During Emperor Xuanzong's reign ==
In the middle of the Kaiyuan era (712–741) of Emperor Zhongzong's nephew Emperor Xuanzong, Li Shizhi became the prefect of Tong Prefecture (通州, in modern Beijing). He was known for being able, and after the imperial attendant Han Chaozong (韓朝宗) surveyed the region, Han recommended him to Emperor Xuanzong. He thereafter successively served as the commandant at Qin Prefecture (秦州, roughly modern Tianshui, Gansu), the prefect of Shan Prefecture (陝州, roughly modern Sanmenxia, Henan), and then mayor of Henan Municipality, to which the eastern capital Luoyang belonged. It was said that Li Shizhi's governance was simple and straightforward, and that he did not dwell on details, to the relief of the officials and people under him. While at Luoyang, he was responsible for building three major levees that alleviated flooding problems that plagued Luoyang, and when a monument was subsequently erected to commemorate his contributions, Emperor Xuanzong had his son Li Lin (李璘) the Prince of Yong write the text and Li Ying the Crown Prince write the heading, a great honor for Li Shizhi. Li Shizhi later served as Yushi Dafu (御史大夫), the chief imperial censor.

In 736, Li Shizhi, lamenting the fact that neither his grandfather nor his father, on account of their removals, received an honored burial, requested that they be allowed to be reburied near the tomb of Emperor Taizong. Emperor Xuanzong agreed, and further posthumously created Li Chengqian a prince and Li Xiang a duke, as well as bestowing posthumous honors on Li Shizhi's uncle Li Jue (李厥) and several of Li Shizhi's brothers. They were buried together in a grand ceremony. Li Shizhi was soon made the minister of justice (刑部尚書, Xingbu Shangshu). It was said that Li Shizhi liked entertaining guests, and that he was able to drink two liters of wine without being drunk. Although he spent nights entertaining guests and only days on the affairs of state, he was able to get everything done.

In 739, Li Shizhi became the governor at You Prefecture (幽州, roughly modern Beijing) and acting military governor (jiedushi) of the region.

In 742, after the death of the chancellor Niu Xianke, Li Shizhi succeeded Niu as Zuo Xiang (左相) -- the head of the examination bureau of government (門下省, Menxia Sheng) and a post considered one for a chancellor; he was also created the Duke of Qinghe. He served alongside Li Linfu, and they fought over control of government, although since Li Shizhi was not a deep thinker, Li Linfu was able to find ways to damage him. For example, on one occasion, Li Linfu told Li Shizhi that there were gold deposits at Mount Hua that could be mined—and Li Shizhi, as Li Linfu intended, then proposed to Emperor Xuanzong to mine the gold deposits. Li Linfu then pointed out that pursuant to Taoist principles, he believed that a mine at Mount Hua would damage Emperor Xuanzong's health, thus bringing imperial displeasure on Li Shizhi. In another incident, in 745, with Li Shizhi also serving as the minister of defense and Emperor Xuanzong's son-in-law Zhang Ji (張垍) serving as deputy minister and whom Li Linfu also disliked, Li Linfu had some 60 officials at the minister of defense accused of corruption, and then coerced confessions out of them by torture, intending to use this to discredit Li Shizhi and Zhang, although neither was punished. However, subsequently, Li Linfu was able to accuse several officials friendly with Li Linfu—Huangfu Weiming (皇甫惟明), Wei Jian (韋堅), Pei Kuan (裴寬), and Han Chaozong—and get them demoted or exiled. Li Shizhi, in fear, offered to resign the chancellor position, and in 746 was removed from his chancellor post, becoming an advisor to the new crown prince (Li Ying having been forced to commit suicide in 737) Li Heng. He wrote a poem in which he lamented that after he was removed, not even his family and friends were visiting him.

Later in 746, however, when Li Linfu made further accusations against Wei, Li Linfu implicated a large number of Wei's associates, including Li Shizhi. Li Shizhi was thus demoted to be the governor of Yichun Commandery. In 747, when Li Linfu was able to get Emperor Xuanzong to send the imperial censor Luo Xishi (羅希奭) to various commanderies to execute Wei and several other officials implicated, the commanderies were terrorized. As Luo was approaching Yichun, Li Shizhi was fearful and committed suicide.

== Notes and references ==
- Old Book of Tang, vol. 99.
- New Book of Tang, vol. 131.
- Zizhi Tongjian, vols. 214, 215.
