= Elysian Brewing Company =

American brewery

- Interactive map of Elysian Brewing Company
- Location: Seattle, Washington, United States
- Coordinates: 47.613988°N 122.315805°W
- Opened: 1995
- Key people: Dick Cantwell (Founder); Joe Bisacca, (CEO/Head of Operations, Founder); Dave Buhler (Founder); Carlos Brito (ABInbev Ceo)
- Owner: Anheuser-Busch InBev
- Subsidiaries: 2 Brewpubs
- Website: www.elysianbrewing.com

Active beers
Name	Type
Superfuzz	Blood Orange Pale Ale
Dragonstooth Stout	Oatmeal Stout
Space Dust	IPA
Mens Room	Original Red
Dayglow	IPA
The Immortal	American IPA
Vahalla Red IPA	Red IPA
Wise ESB	Extra Special/Strong Bitter (ESB)
Zephyrus Pilsner	German Pilsner

Seasonal beers
Name	Type
Bete Blanche	Belgian-style Tripel
Bifrost Winter Ale	Winter Warmer
Dark O’ The Moon	Pumpkin Stout
Great Pumpkin Ale	Imperial Pumpkin Ale
Night Owl Pumpkin Ale	Pumpkin Ale
Superfuzz Blood Orange	Blood Orange Pale Ale

The Elysian Brewing Company is an American brewery, owned by AB InBev, that operates two pubs in Seattle.

== History ==
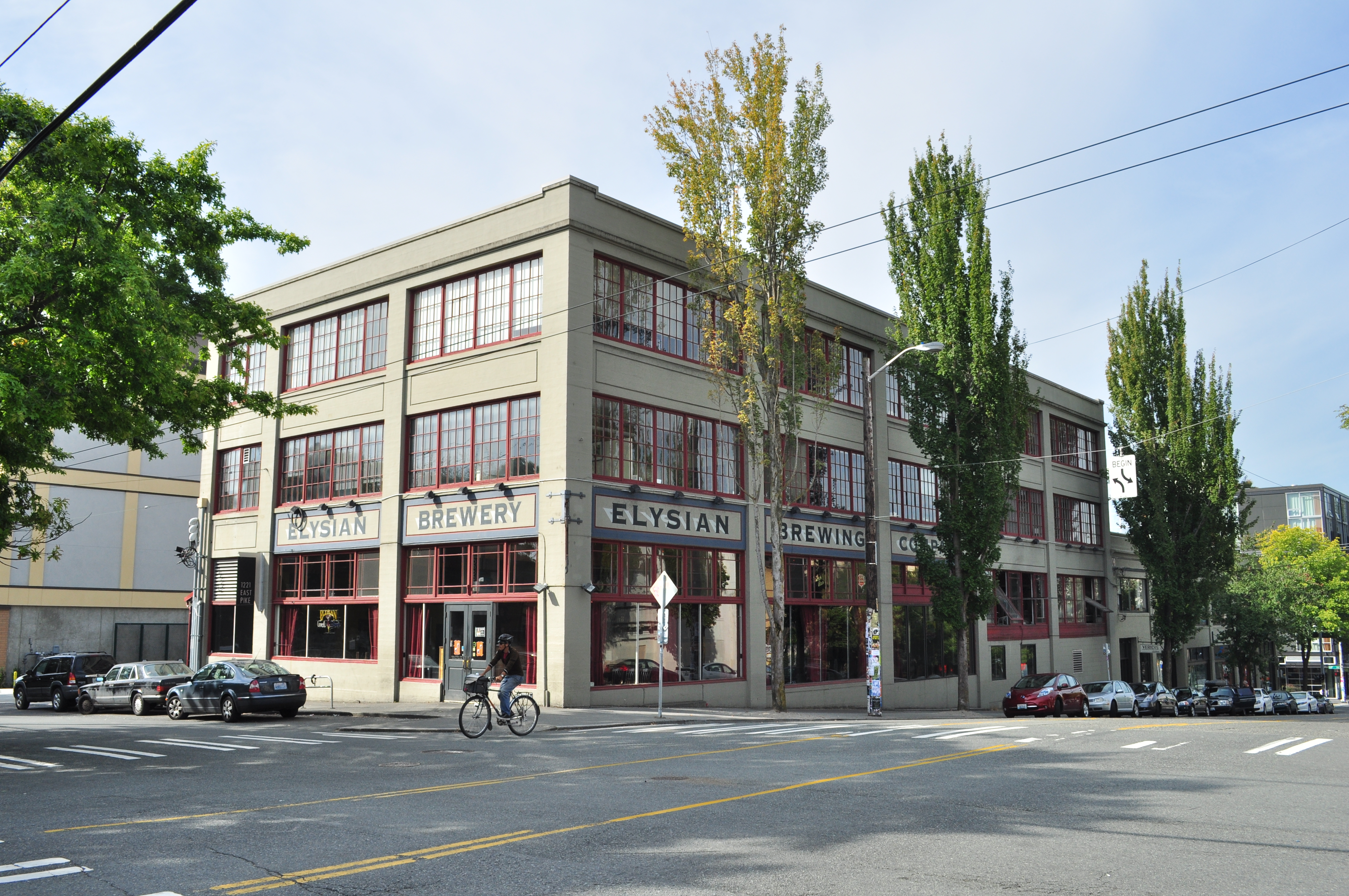
Elysian's Capitol Hill location

Elysian was founded in 1995 by Dave Buhler, Joe Bisacca, and Dick Cantwell. Cantwell had been a homebrewer who gained a reputation at the Duwamps Cafe, the Pike Place Brewery, and Big Time Brewing. Buhler is a former spirits wholesaler and Bisacca was a home brewer and a vice president at Seafirst Bank. The original location was opened in 1996 in the Capitol Hill neighborhood with a 20 barrel capacity.

The company operated a brewpub at the local GameWorks arcade between 1997 and 2002. In 2003, their pub and bistro, Tangletown, was opened near Green Lake. The company's largest location, Elysian Fields, was opened in 2006 near CenturyLink Field, which is often busy on game days.

In 2011, Elysian expanded its operations with a 35,000-square-foot (3,300 m^{2}) production-only facility in the Georgetown neighborhood.

Anheuser-Busch InBev acquired Elysian Brewing in early 2015.

In November 2024, Elysian began closing its Seattle Georgetown facility. The two brewpubs, including the original Capitol Hill location, remain open.

== Beers ==
Beer	% ABV	IBU	Description
Avatar Jasmine IPA	6.3	45	IPA
Contact Haze	6.0%	39	Hazy IPA
Dragonstooth Stout	8.0	60	Stout
Dayglow IPA	7.4	65	India Pale Ale
Loser Pale Ale	7.0	57	Pale ale
Men's Room Red	5.6	33	Amber ale
Perseus Porter	5.4	47	Porter
Space Dust	8.2	73	IPA
The Immortal IPA	6.3	54	IPA with new world hops
Vahalla Red IPA	7.5	70	
Wise ESB	5.9	60	Extra Special Bitter, Elysian's first brew
Zephyrus Pilsner	7.5	80	Pilsner-style lager

=== Seasonal ===
Seasonal beers include:

Beer	% ABV	IBU	Availability	Description
Split Shot	6.0	28	Spring	
Bifrost Winter Ale	8.3	58	Winter	
Punkuccino Coffee Pumpkin Ale	6.0	20	Fall	Pumpkin beer
Dark O' The Moon	7.5	20	Fall	Pumpkin beer
Great Pumpkin Ale	8.1	20	Fall	Pumpkin beer
Night Owl Pumpkin Ale	6.7	18	Fall	Pumpkin beer
Superfuzz Blood Orange	6.4	45	Summer	Ale brewed with blood orange
Dank Dust	8.2	62	Spring (420)	"Weed aroma" India Pale Ale, i.e. smells like "dank" marijuana

=== Pub specialties ===
Elysian Brewing Company brews many beers, which are only available at their brewpub and restaurant or are sometimes seasonally available on tap in some Seattle pubs. These include The Golden Boot, brewed in honor of Seattle soccer; Haleakala, named after Maui's easterly volcano; Hombre, a Mexican-style lager, brewed as a house beer for a local Mexican restaurant; and Xoxo, a nitrogen-infused, chocolate, chilli-spiced Irish-style stout often brewed around Valentine's Day.

== Brews ==
The Wise ESB was the brewery's first beer. Elysian has won multiple awards for their beers. The Wise, Dragontooth stout, and Avatar Jasmine IPA have done well at the World Beer Cup. The brewery's beers earned it the Large Brewpub of the Year award at the Great American Beer Festival in 1999, 2003, and 2004.

Elysian had a collaborative partnership with the New Belgium Brewing Company of Ft. Collins, Colorado.

The brewery also partners with The Mens Room [sic] (a program on the Seattle rock music radio station KISW) to produce Mens Room Original Ale; previous offerings include Mens Room Red and Mens Room Gold.
