= Shangri-La Beer =

Chinese brewing company

Shangri-la Highland Craft Brewery
- Type: Publicly traded
- Industry: Alcoholic beverage
- Founded: 2009
- Founder: Songtsen Gyalzur
- Headquarters: Shangri-La City, China
- Key people: Songtsen Gyalzur CEO, Karma Tachen (Vice Chairman), Tseten Gyalzur (Vice Chairman), Freddy Stauffer (Swiss brewmaster and expert for quality management)
- Products: Beer
- Brands: Yalaso, Son Gha, Super Nova, Black Yak, Tibetan Pale Ale, Fat Dolma
- Number of employees: 82 (2016)
- Website: www.shangri-la-beer.com/en/

The Shangri-la Highland Craft Brewery is a craft brewing company in China. The company is based in Shangri-La City, which is located in China's north-western Yunnan province. This area is known as the Dêqên Tibetan Autonomous Prefecture. Founded in 2009, it was the country's first fully licensed craft brewing company.

== History ==
With the support of the government, Shangri-La City's first beer brewery was founded in 2009 by Songtsen Gyalzur. The initial investment was expanded in 2013, and formal production began in June 2015. The brewery was established in an intact cultural and natural environment in cooperation with Swiss and German beer experts. In order to meet the annual needs of China's growing domestic craft beer market, the brewery management decided to expand the production line and began building a new brewery in Shangri-La Industrial Park in 2013. The Shangri-La Highland Craft Brewery applies German beer purity laws, or Reinheitsgebot.

Shangri-La Beer's CEO, Songtsen Gyalzur, was born and raised in Switzerland. His mother was an orphan who moved to Germany and began her studies after her adoption by a young German doctor couple. At the age of 36, she returned to her hometown in Tibet and established its first orphanage, "Tendol Gyalzur Children's Charity," and she still continues to care for children.

Songtsen Gyalzur opted to give up his real estate company in Switzerland and return home to Shangri-La City to assist his mother with the orphanage. He started a business in his hometown, Shangri-La City, to support his mother's project and address the employment issue of the young people who grew up at the orphanage. Songtsen Gyalzur established the Shangri-La Highland Craft Brewery, which employs young people from the orphanage and supports local agricultural development. Eighty percent of the brewery's employees are people who were raised at the orphanage. Part of the company's proceeds are donated to the orphanage’s daily operations, and a highland barley planting base of 583000 square meters was established locally.

== Location ==
The Shangri-La Highland Craft Brewery is located on the Tibetan plateau at 3300 meters above sea level in the city of Shangri-La. Shangri-La is called in Tibetan Gyalthang or Gyaitang, which is reputedly the Valley of the Blue Moon and means "Royal plains". This ancient name is reflected in the Tibetan Pinyin name of the town of Jiantang (建塘; Jiàntáng), the county seat. Due to its location on 3300 meters above sea level. In the second half of the 20th century, Shangri-La City was called Zhongdian (中甸; Zhōngdiàn) but was renamed Shangri-La on December 17, 2001, after the fictional land of Shangri-La in the 1933 James Hilton novel Lost Horizon, in an effort to promote tourism in the area.

== Shangri-La Beer Visitors Center ==
The Visitors Center of Shangri-La Highland Craft Brewery is located at Qingkou Industrial Zone, 674400 Zhongdian, Yunnan, China, approximately 10 kilometers outside of Shangri-La City. Shangri-La has tours, including a beer tasting, that are offered in English, Chinese, and German.

== City partnership between Arosa and Shangri-La City ==
Through the initiative of the Shangri-La Highland Craft Brewery, the tourist resort city of Arosa in Switzerland and Shangri-La City in China signed a formal friendship city relationship agreement in Arosa in 2012. In this way, the aim of the partnership is to strengthen the relationship between the two cities and learn from each other to foster a common development. Shangri-La Highland Craft Brewery became the first mutual project of the sister-city partnership through the successful research and development of highland barley used as a raw material to brew craft beer. On the day of Shangri-La Beer Brewery's opening ceremony, the Swiss ambassador to China as well as a delegation from the Arosa government attended to congratulate all parties involved.

== Awards ==
- European Beer Star 2016, Silver Medal – Black Yack (Bohemian – Style, Schwarzbier)
- Brussels Beer Challenge 2016, Silver Medal – Yalaso (Lager: Light Beer)
- Brussels Beer Challenge 2016, Bronze Medal – Songha (Lager: Helles)
- China Beer Awards 2016, Trophy – Songha (European Lager)
- China Beer Awards 2016, Silver Medal – Songha (European Lager)
- China Beer Awards 2016, Silver Medal – Yalaso (European Lager)
- China Beer Awards 2016, Bronze Medal – TPA (Pale Ale)
- China Beer Awards 2016, Bronze Medal – Fat Dolma (Bock)
- China Beer Awards 2016, Bronze Medal – Super Nova (Bock)

== See also ==
- Beer in China
- Shangri-La City
