= Eight Immortals of the Wine Cup =

Group of Tang dynasty scholars

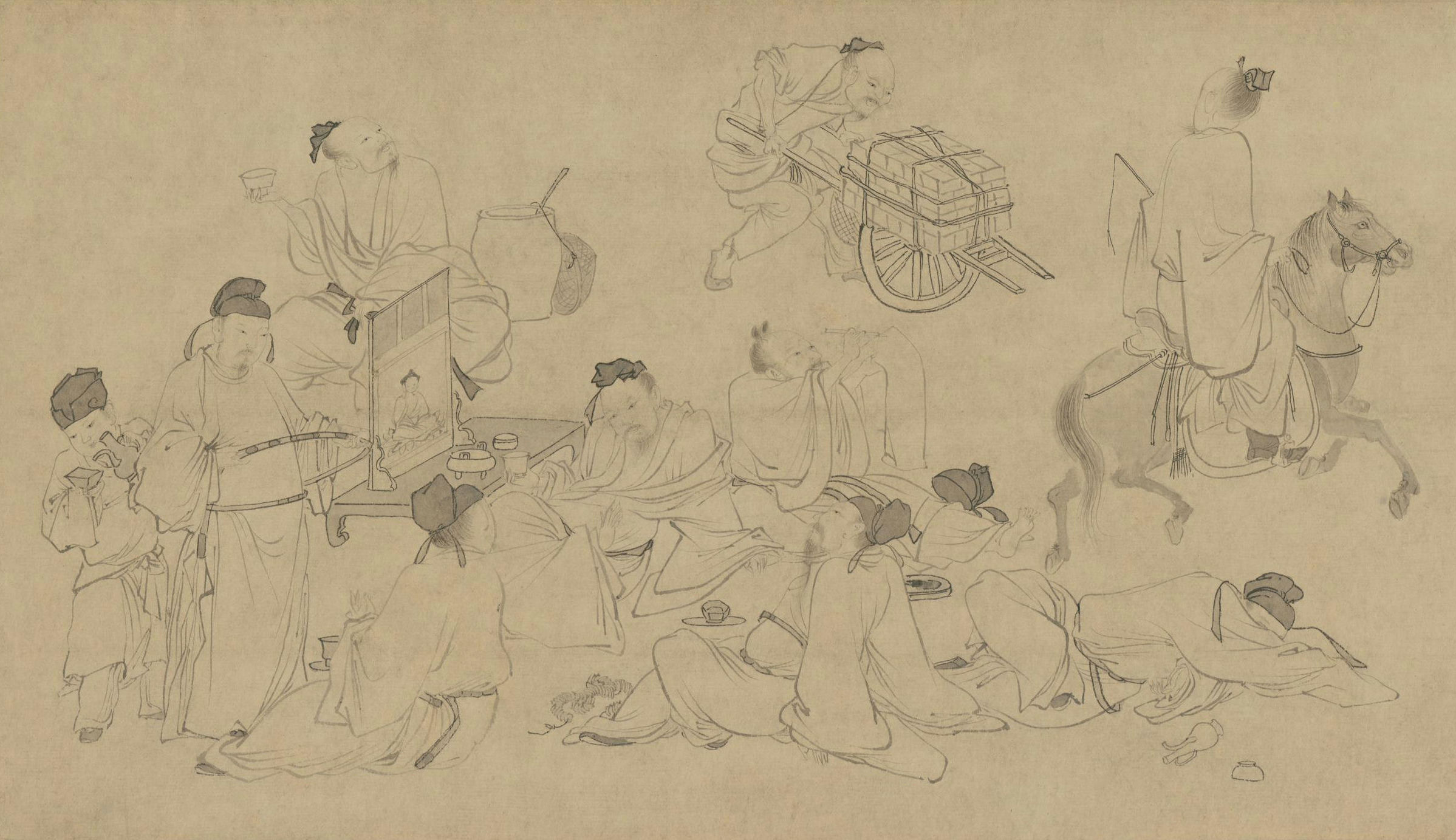
The Eight Immortals of the Wine Cup depicted by Ming dynasty painter Du Jin

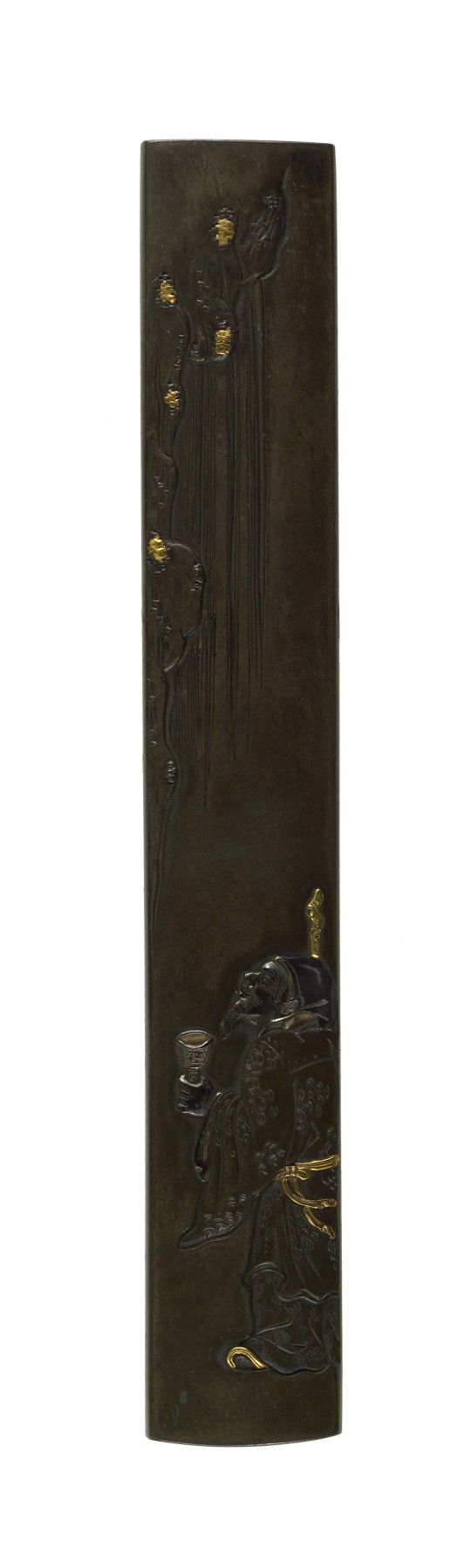
Kozuka with Li Bai drinking a cup of wine while looking at a waterfall

The Eight Immortals of the Wine Cup or Eight Immortals Indulged in Wine (Chinese: 飲中八仙; pinyin: yǐnzhōng bāxiān) were a group of Tang dynasty scholars who are known for their love of alcoholic beverages. They are not deified and the use of "Immortal" (xiān) is metaphorical. The term is used in a poem by Du Fu, as well as in the biography of Li Bai in the New Book of Tang.

They appeared in Du's poem in the following order:

- He Zhizhang (賀知章)
- Li Jin (李璡)
- Li Shizhi (李適之)
- Cui Zongzhi (崔宗之)
- Su Jin (蘇晉)
- Li Bai (李白)
- Zhang Xu (張旭)
- Jiao Sui (焦遂)

== See also ==
- Alcohol in China
