= Harbin Brewery =

Chinese brewery

- Location: Harbin, China
- Opened: 1900

Harbin Brewery (simplified Chinese: 哈尔滨啤酒集团; traditional Chinese: 哈爾濱啤酒集團; pinyin: Hā'ěrbīn Píjiǔ Jítuán) is a Chinese brewery founded in 1900 in Harbin, China. As China's fourth largest brewery and its oldest one, it has a leading position in Northeast China and owns the Hapi beer brand.

Harbin has increased its annual beer production capacity to over 1 million tons and has become a giant in China's beer industry after its successful reform and listing on the Hong Kong stock market. In comparison to Tsingtao Beer or Zhujiang Beer, however, Harbin's share in European and American markets is minor. In the North American market, Harbin beer was first sold in ethnic Chinese supermarkets (which remain its primary point of sales today), and gradually begun to expand to other Asian supermarkets.

== History ==
The history of Harbin beer dates back to 1900, when Jan Wróblewski, a Pole from Tarczyn, then located in the Russian Partition of Poland, founded a brewery in Northeast China (then called Manchuria), which he named after himself. The initial objective of the Brewery was to supply Russians working on the Trans-Manchurian Railway project started in 1898. In 1908, the company was renamed Gloria. In 1932, the brewery was renamed Harbin Brewery Factory, when it went into joint control of Chinese and Czech nationals. Later, in 1946, after the Soviet Red Army captured Manchuria, the company was controlled by Soviet nationals, who called it Quilin Stock Company Limited. This situation prevailed until 1950 when Stalin ordered the return of Chinese assets, and ownership was returned to the Chinese government. The Chinese renamed it Harbin Brewery and operated it as a state-owned entity. Driven by the famine the company became the first to brew beer with corn instead of rice, in 1959. Through the 1960s, the company focused on investing to improve its technology, and in 1973 it installed its first sterilization machine in Heilongjiang Province. In June 2003, SABMiller acquired a 29.6% equity stake in Harbin. In 2004 it was taken over by Anheuser-Busch after a bitter takeover battle with SABMiller.

== Harbin Beer ==
Harbin Beer (simplified Chinese: 哈尔滨啤酒; traditional Chinese: 哈爾濱啤酒; pinyin: Hā'ěrbīn Píjiǔ) is a 4.8% abv pale lager. It uses European and Chinese "Qindao Dahua" hops, two-row malt, and German yeast.

== Beers ==
Hapi and Golden Hapi. Harbin Heart and Harbin Premium Lager. One of Harbin's beers is a wheat beer.

== See also ==
- List of Chinese companies
- Yanjing Beer
- Tsingtao Beer
- Zhujiang Beer
- Beer and breweries in China
