= Yidi (god) =

God in Chinese mythology

Yidi (仪狄: Yee Dee) is the goddess of wine and alcohol in Chinese mythology (Daoism). She was the brewer credited with the invention of wine during the reign of Yu the Great.

== Legend ==
According to some legends, Yidi was the first winemaker in China and a descendant of Yu Shun. She had created the alcoholic beverage as a gift to the emperor Yu the Great (c. 2100 BC); however some sources credit the invention to Du Kang. That said, there are still records of Yidi's winemaking in the pre-Qin dynasty classics, such as Lü Buwei's Lüshi Chunqiu (Master Lü's Spring and Autumn Annals) and Liu Xiang's Zhan Guo Ce (Strategies of the Warring States).

The Strategies of the Warring States stated that Yu the Great's daughter ordered Yidi to supervise winemaking. Yidi then produced a delicious wine dedicated to Yu The Great's daughter and invited her to taste it. Though having enjoyed the wine, she thought it was far too potent and stated, "Of course I can handle my alcohol but what about the future Emperors? A sozzled ruler would be a disaster for the nation." After Yidi had received her feedback, she would continue to perfect a brewing method that produced a fine wine of supreme quality. Yidi, however, was unfortunately later banned from wine brewing. Despite his misfortune, Yidi did not stop refining his brewing method.

Some stories, instead, share that the Emperor’s daughter wanted to present her father with an amazing gift and asked Yidi for help. She then began to experiment with brewing and fermentation. Which resulted in the creation of a spicy and strong drink (now known as wine today). In hopes of pleasing the Emperor, Yidi presented the wine to him. However, when the Emperor tried the drink, he could not handle the potent drink, and he tried to hide his disgust. Yu the Great, stated that the wine was “almost too strong for him” and that his heirs would not be able to drink it. After the incident, Yidi was forbidden from ever brewing again.

== Influence ==
=== The Yidi Award ===
The Yidi Award is a prestigious national wine award in China. The award is presented once every two years to enterprises or individuals engaged in wine production and the production of wine-related products. Each special award is selected according to wine categories.
