= He Zhizhang =

Chinese writer (659–744)

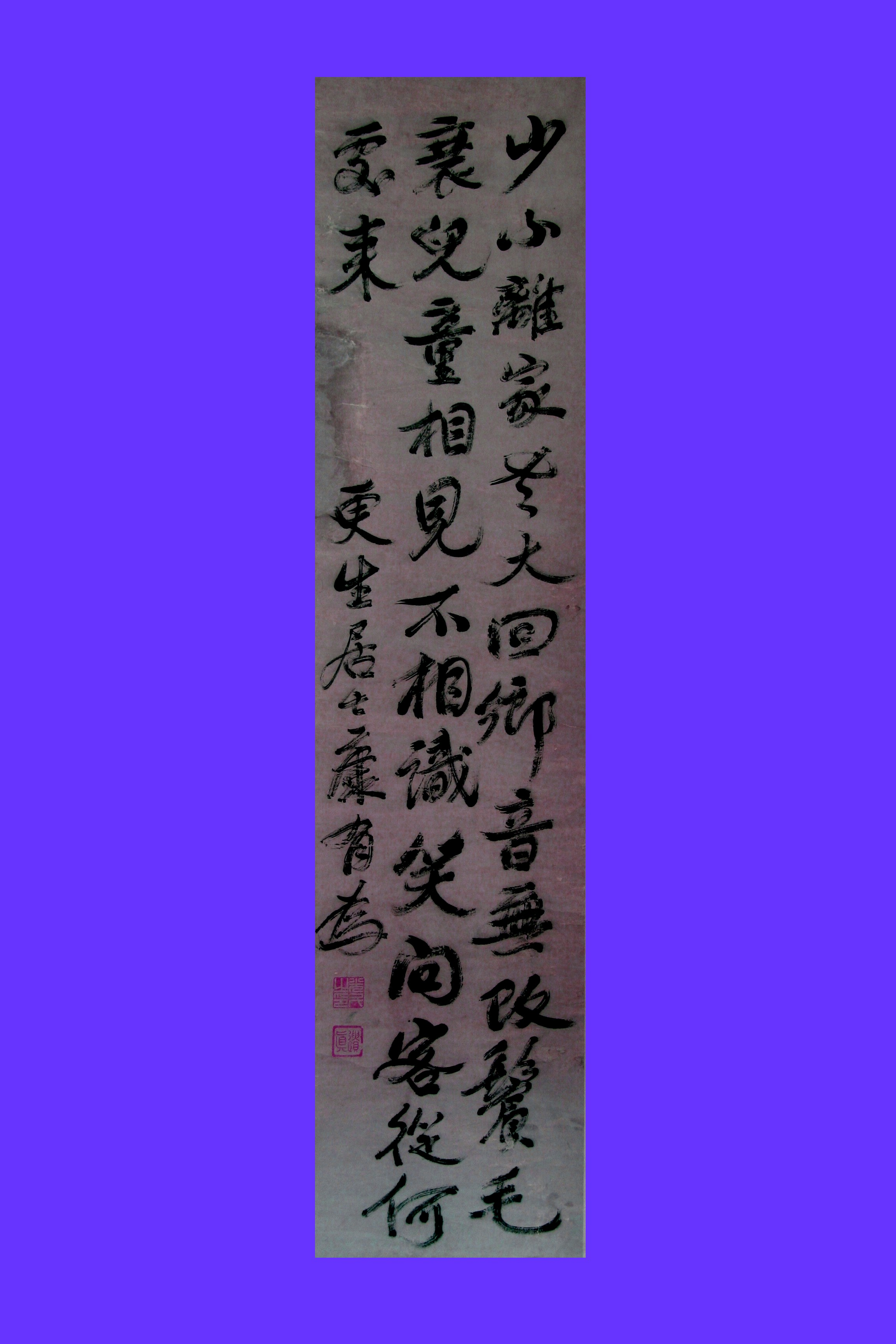
Tang Poem: Calligraphy by Qing dynasty politician Kang Youwei, He Zhizhang's poem "Returning Home As An Unrecognized Old Man", Nantoyōsō Collection, Japan

He Zhizhang (Chinese: 賀知章; pinyin: Hè Zhīzhāng; Wade–Giles: Ho Chih-chang, c. 659–744), courtesy name Jizhen (季真), was a Chinese poet and politician born in Yongxing, Yue Prefecture (越州永兴, present-day Xiaoshan, Zhejiang) during the Tang dynasty. He entered the civil service after achieving a jinshi degree in 695 during the reign of Empress Regnant Wu Zetian, and continued serving the court under three subsequent emperors Zhongzong, Ruizong, and Xuanzong, serving first in the Imperial Academy (guozijian), and then in the Ministry of Rites and Ministry of Works.

Well regarded for his poetry and calligraphy, he is one of the Tang dynasty's Eight Immortals of the Wine Cup. Only a few of his works have survived. His well-known works include Ode to the Willow (咏柳) and a pair of poems, On Returning Home (回鄉偶書). On Returning Home is a wistful and nostalgic work composed by He on his return to his home village at the age of 85, when he was granted retirement by Emperor Xuanzong in 744, just a few months before his death, after almost five decades of service to the imperial court. The first of the pair, "Returning Home As An Unrecognized Old Man", is particularly well-known, having been anthologized in the Three Hundred Tang Poems and appearing in elementary school textbooks in China.

《回鄉偶書 · 其一》

少小離家老大回，鄉音無改鬢毛衰 。

兒童相見不相識 ，笑問客從何處來？

Of his surviving calligraphic works, one is a grass-script copy of the Xiaojing, currently located in Japan, another is an engraved stele (龍瑞宮記) located near Shaoxing, Zhejiang.
