= Pumpkin ale =

Style of beer

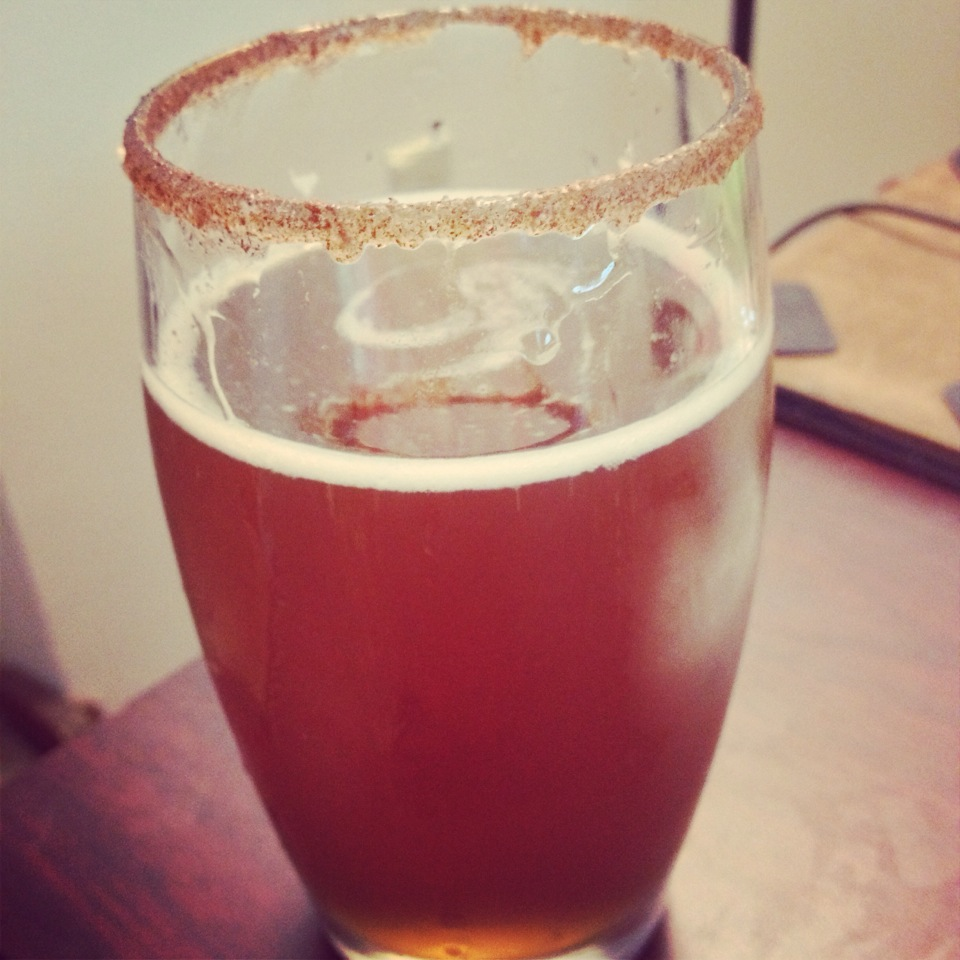
Pumpkin ale with a cinnamon sugar rim

Pumpkin ale is a popular style of beer in the United States. Pumpkin ale may be produced using pumpkin flesh in combination with malt or other more typical beer grains as a portion of the mash bill, contributing fermentable sugars to the wort. It may also be produced by adding natural or artificial flavor to a finished beer. Spice flavor may be added to evoke the flavor of pumpkin pie, a popular American wintertime dessert.

Many styles of pumpkin ale are produced, including pale ales, wheat beers, porters, and stouts. Often produced as a seasonal beer in the fall, it is produced by several breweries including Sea Dog Brewery, Shipyard Brewing Company, Saint Arnold Brewing Company and Blue Moon.

== History ==
The brewing of beer with pumpkin in the United States dates back to 1771. The first commercially brewed pumpkin ale came from Buffalo Bill's Brewery in Hayward, California, in the 1980s, the recipe based on brewing studies made by George Washington. The beer's contemporary popularity has been described as part of a "pumpkin spice craze," initiated by a rash of pumpkin- and pumpkin-spice-flavored consumer food products, such as the Pumpkin Spice Latte.

== See also ==
- List of squash and pumpkin dishes
