= Guangzhou Zhujiang Brewery Group =

Chinese state-owned enterprise which deals mainly in beer and related products

Zhujiang Beer
- Native name: 珠江啤酒集团有限公司
- Industry: Beverages
- Founded: 1985
- Headquarters: Guangzhou, Guangdong, China
- Area served: Worldwide
- Products: Beers
- Website: www.zhujiangbeer.com

Zhujiang Brewery Group Co., Ltd
- Simplified Chinese: 珠江啤酒股份有限公司
- Traditional Chinese: 珠江啤酒股份有限公司
Transcriptions
Standard Mandarin
- Hanyu Pinyin: Zhūjiāng Píjiǔ Gǔfèn Yǒuxiàn Gōngsī
Yue: Cantonese
- Jyutping: zyu1 gong1 be1 zau2 gu2 fan6*2 jau5 haan6 gung1 si1

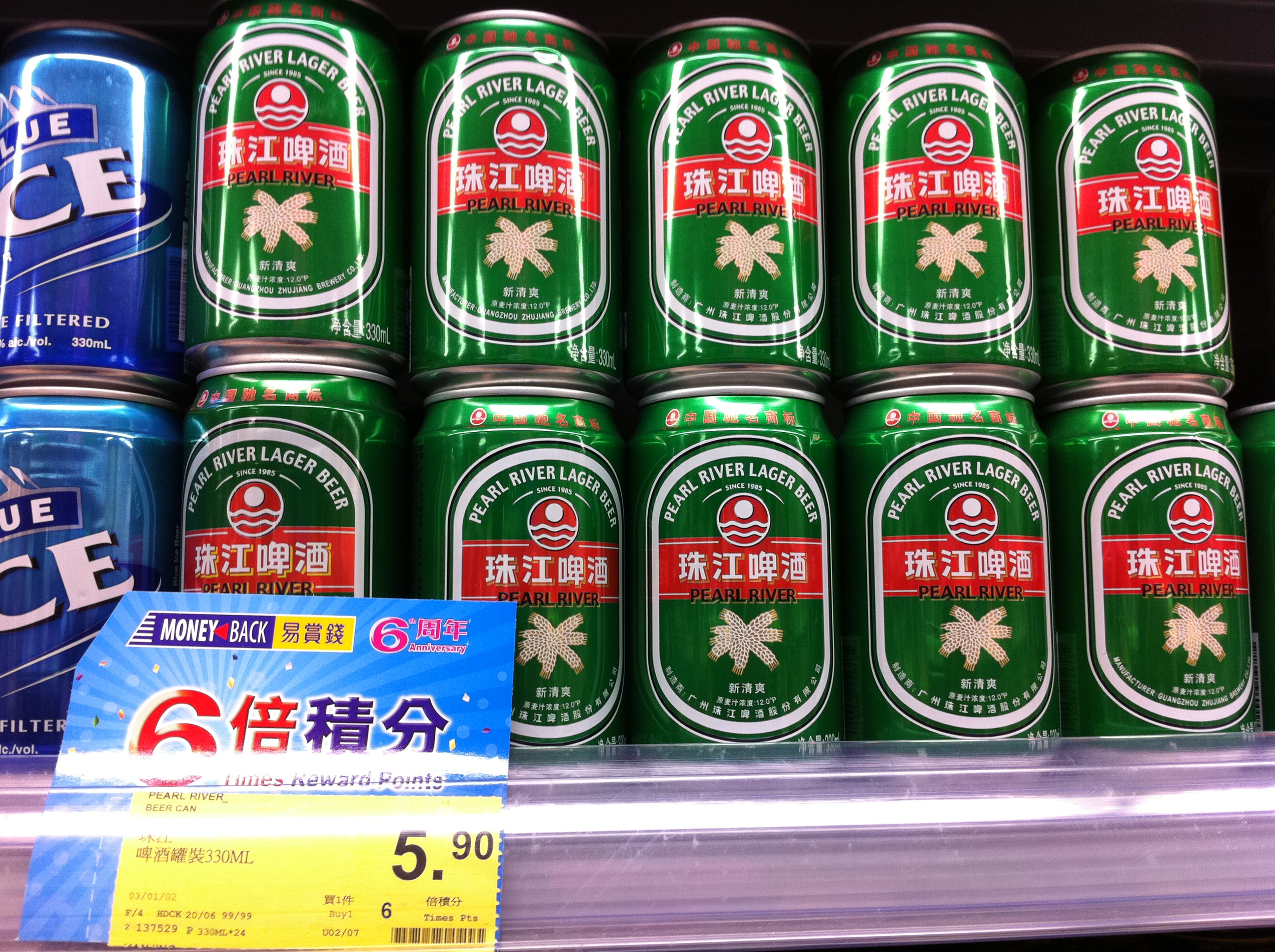

Zhujiang Brewery (Zhujiang Brewery Group Co., Ltd) (Chinese: 珠江啤酒集团有限公司; pinyin: zhūjiāng píjiǔ; Jyutping: zyu1 gong1 be1 zau2) was established in 1985 and is a large state-owned enterprise which deals mainly in beer and related products such as labels, cartons, crates, etc. The brewery is one of the largest single site production facilities in the world, and produces Zhujiang Beer. Its headquarters is in Haizhu District.

== Businesses ==
Wholly owned subsidiaries

- Hong Kong Yongxin International Co
- Guangzhou Baiyun Rongsen Packing Industrial Co
- Zhujiang Brewery Group Labor Service Co., Ltd
- Guangzhou Zhujiang Brewery Real Estate Co
- Share-controlled subsidiaries
- Guangzhou Zhufeng Color Printing Products Co., Ltd
- Guangzhou Rongfeng Printing & Papers Products Enterprise Co., Ltd
- Guangzhou Zhujiang Brewery Joint-stock Co., Ltd
- Guangzhou Yongxin Zhujiang Brewery Co., Ltd
- Shantou Zhujiang Brewery Bottling Co., Ltd
- Haifeng Zhujiang Brewery Bottling Co., Ltd
- Xinfeng Zhujiang Brewery Bottling Co., Ltd
- Yangjiang Zhujiang Brewery Bottling Co., Ltd
- Meizhou Zhujiang Brewery Bottling Co., Ltd
- Guangzhou Conghua Zhujiang Brewery Bottling Co., Ltd
- Shijiazhuang Zhujiang Brewery Co., Ltd
- Zhanjiang Zhujiang Brewery Co., Ltd
- Dongguan Zhujiang Brewery Co., Ltd
- Zhongshan Zhujiang Brewery Co., Ltd
- Hong Kong Dongjing Trading CO., Ltd
- Guangzhou Xinye Advertising Co., Ltd
- Guangzhou Rongxin Container Co., Ltd

Minor Share Subsidiaries

- Nanhai Yongxin Cork Manufacturing Co., Ltd
- Guangzhou Julihang Exhibition Co., Ltd
- Guangzhou Entrepreneur Club
- Shanghai International Wine Development Co., Ltd

Others

- Guangzhou Dongwei Industrial & Development Co

== Zhujiang beer ==
Zhujiang beer (珠江啤酒) is a 5.3% abv pale lager, and is one of 4 Chinese national beer brands. Zhujiang is a leading brand in China; 48,000 bottles are consumed per hour. It is particularly successful in the South of China. The beer is also exported to countries around the globe, including Canada, France, Australia, U.S., South Korea, Sweden and the UK.

Zhujiang is brewed in Guangzhou, in the South of China. The beer is named after the Pearl River, or Zhu Jiang, as Guangzhou is located in the Pearl River Delta. The beer is brewed with water piped from a natural spring source direct to the brewery to guarantee the quality and freshness. The fresh spring water is then combined with Czech hops, German yeast, and Canadian Barley Malt.

== See also ==
- Beer and breweries in China
