= Beijing Yanjing Brewery =

Brewery in Beijing, China

Beijing Yanjing Beer Company Limited 北京燕京啤酒股份有限公司

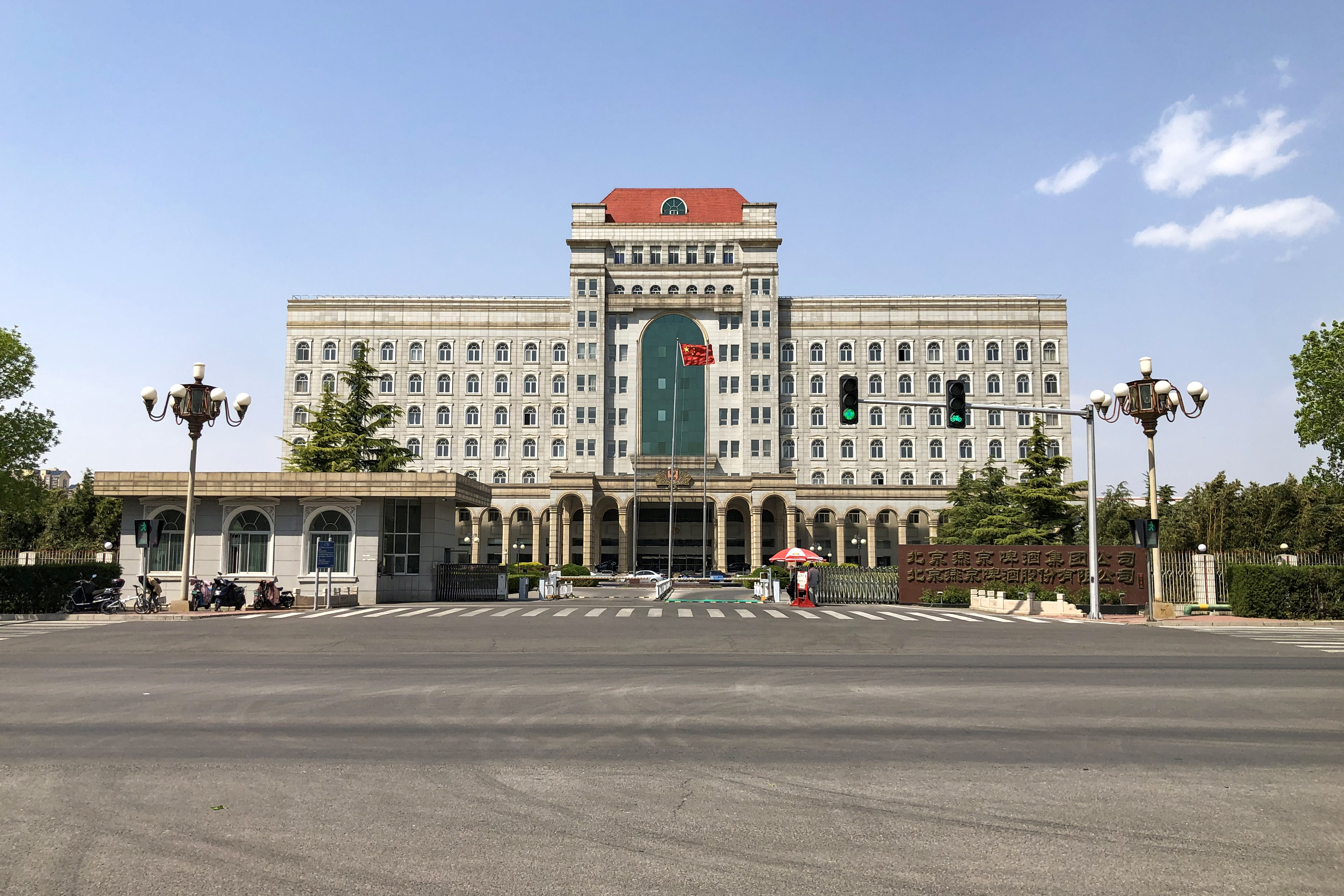
- Company headquarters
- Type: State-owned enterprise
- Industry: Beer
- Founded: 1980
- Headquarters: Number 9 Shuanghe Road, Shunyi District, Beijing, People's Republic of China
- Area served: People's Republic of China
- Key people: President: Mr. Geng Chao
- Products: Beer, mineral water, raw materials of beer, feedstuffs, yeast and plastic boxes
- Number of employees: 42,239
- Website: www.yanjing.com.cn

Beijing Yanjing Brewery (SZSE: 000729) is a brewing company founded in 1980 in Beijing, China. Yanjing Beer was designated as the official beer served at state banquets in the Great Hall of the People in February 1995.

The company produced 57.1 million hectoliters of beer in 2013, making it the 8th biggest brewery in the world and the 3rd biggest in China.

== Products ==
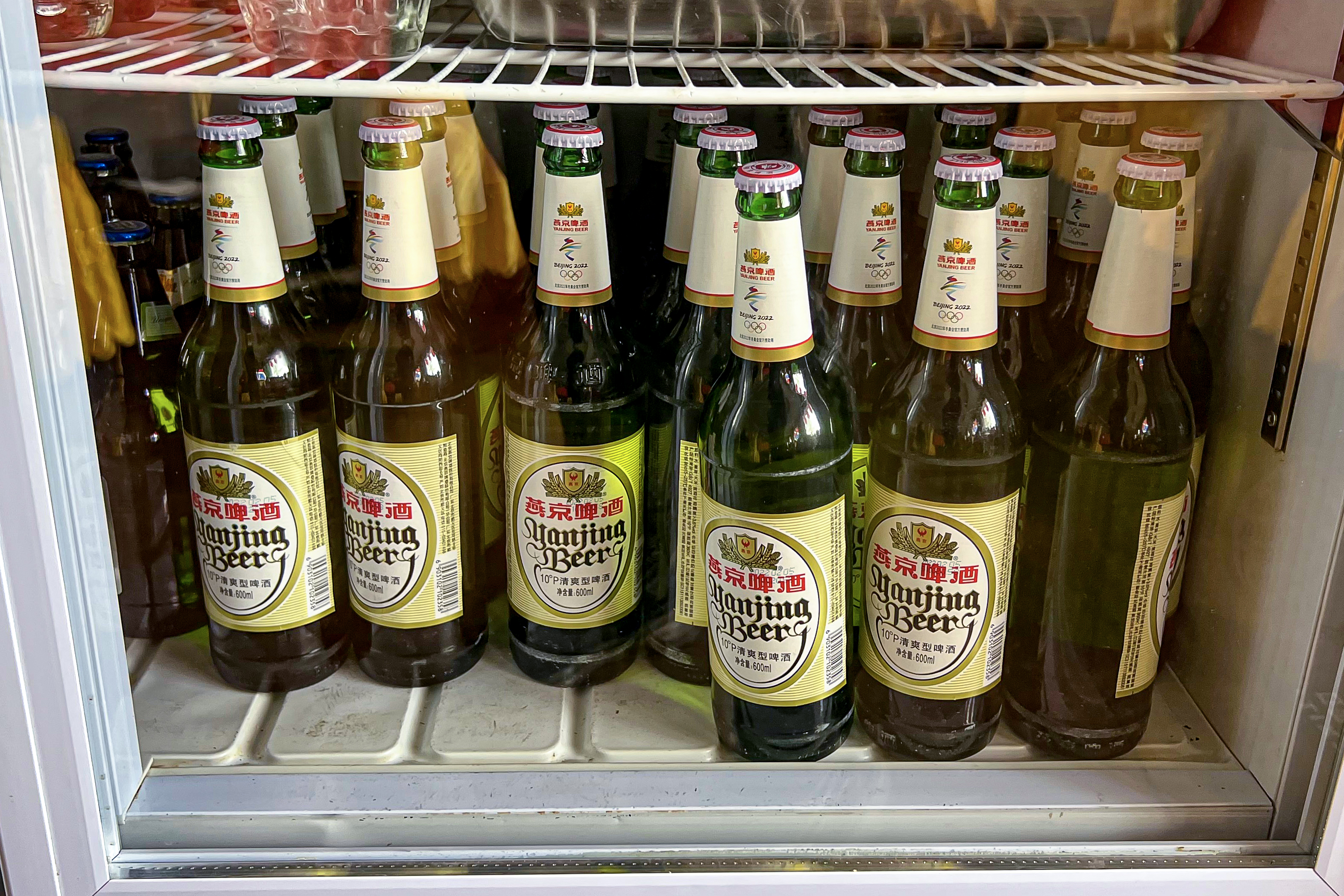
"Normal", or original, Yanjing Beer at a restaurant in Beijing

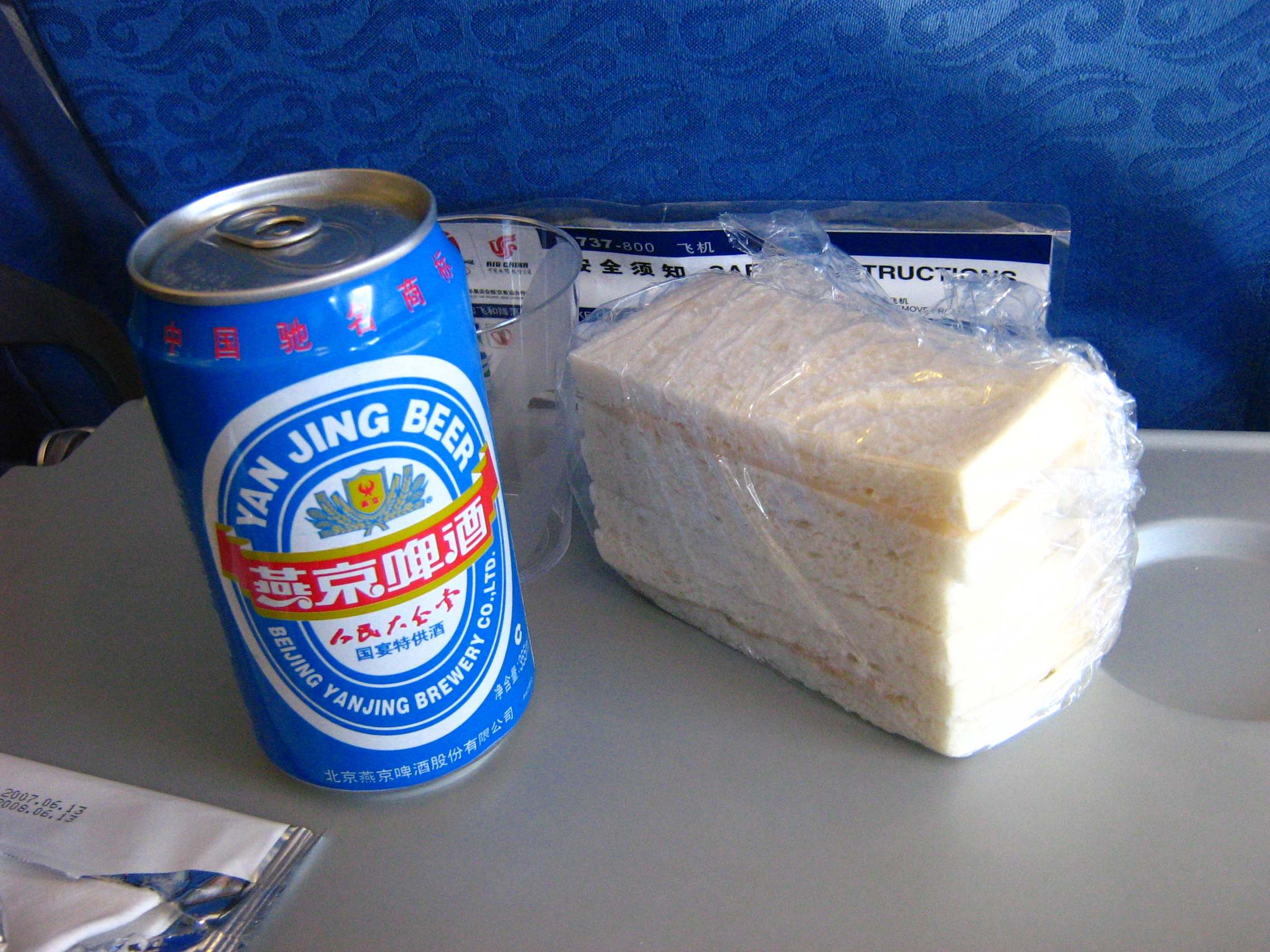
A can of Yanjing Beer served on board an Air China plane

The company produces a range of mainly pale lagers under the brand name Yanjing. Other brands include Liquan, Huiquan and Xuelu.
