= Pilsner Urquell Brewery =

Czech beer brewery

Plzeňský prazdroj, a. s.
- Interactive map of Plzeňský prazdroj, a. s.
- Type: Subsidiary
- Location: Plzeň, Czech Republic
- Coordinates: 49°44′48″N 13°23′14″E
- Opened: 1842; 184 years ago
- Annual production volume: 9.7 million hectolitres (8,300,000 US bbl) (2013)
- Revenue: €640 million (2019)
- Owner: Asahi Group Holdings
- Website: pilsner-urquell.cz

Active beers
Name	Type
Pilsner Urquell	Pilsner

Plzeňský Prazdroj, a. s. (pronounced [ˈpl̩zɛɲskiː ˈprazdroj a ˈɛs]; Pilsner Urquell Brewery) is a Czech brewery which opened in 1842 in Plzeň, Bohemia. It was the first brewery to produce a pale lager, branded as Pilsner Urquell, which became so popular and was so much copied that more than two-thirds of the beer produced in the world today is pale lager, sometimes named pils, pilsner and pilsener after Pilsner Urquell. The brewery name, Pilsner Urquell, which can be roughly translated into English as "the original source at Pilsen", was adopted as a trademark in 1898. Pilsner Urquell is the largest producer and exporter of beer in the Czech Republic.

The brewery was part of the SABMiller group of companies from 1999 to 2017. As part of agreements with regulators before Anheuser-Busch InBev was allowed to acquire SABMiller in 2016, Pilsner Urquell was sold to Japan-based Asahi Breweries in 2017.

== History ==
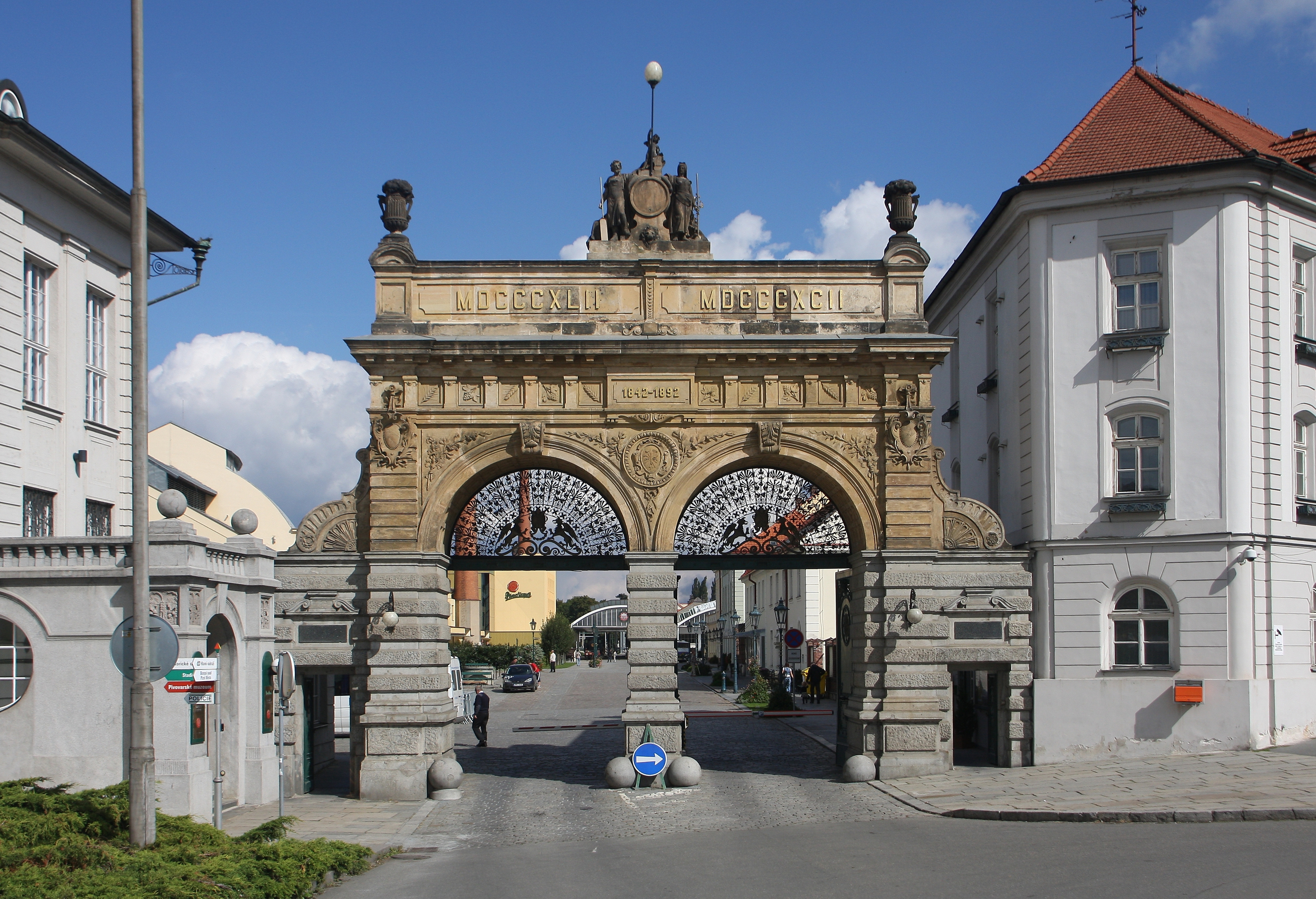
Pilsner Urquell Brewery main gate

The brewery was founded in 1839 by both local Czech-speaking and German-speaking citizens in Bohemian city of Plzeň as Bürgerbrauerei (citizens' brewery, later translated to Měšťanský pivovar in Czech). The first beer was brewed here in 1842 by Bavarian brewer Josef Groll. In 1859, “Pilsner Bier” was registered as a brand name at the local Chamber of Commerce and Trade. In 1869, a competitor was founded as a joint stock company, later known as Gambrinus. In 1898 the German trademark Urquell and Czech trademark Prazdroj were created, to underline the claim of being the older, original source of Pilsner beer. In 1932 Měšťanský pivovar merged with Plzeňské akciové pivovary. In 1946, the brewery was nationalized under the name Plzeňské pivovary (Plzeň breweries).

After the fall of communism in late 1989, the brewery was turned into a public share company, then renamed in 1994 after the Czech name of their famous beer, Plzeňský Prazdroj. In 1999, they started to merge with Pivovar Radegast a.s. and Pivovar Velké Popovice a. s..

The brewery has been the largest exporter of beer produced in the Czech Republic since 2000 when production surpassed that of Budějovický Budvar. Pilsner was chosen to take part in the Expo 2025 that will be in Osaka, Japan. The company will showcase its brewing heritage and authentic taste of Czech brewing tradition.

=== Timeline ===
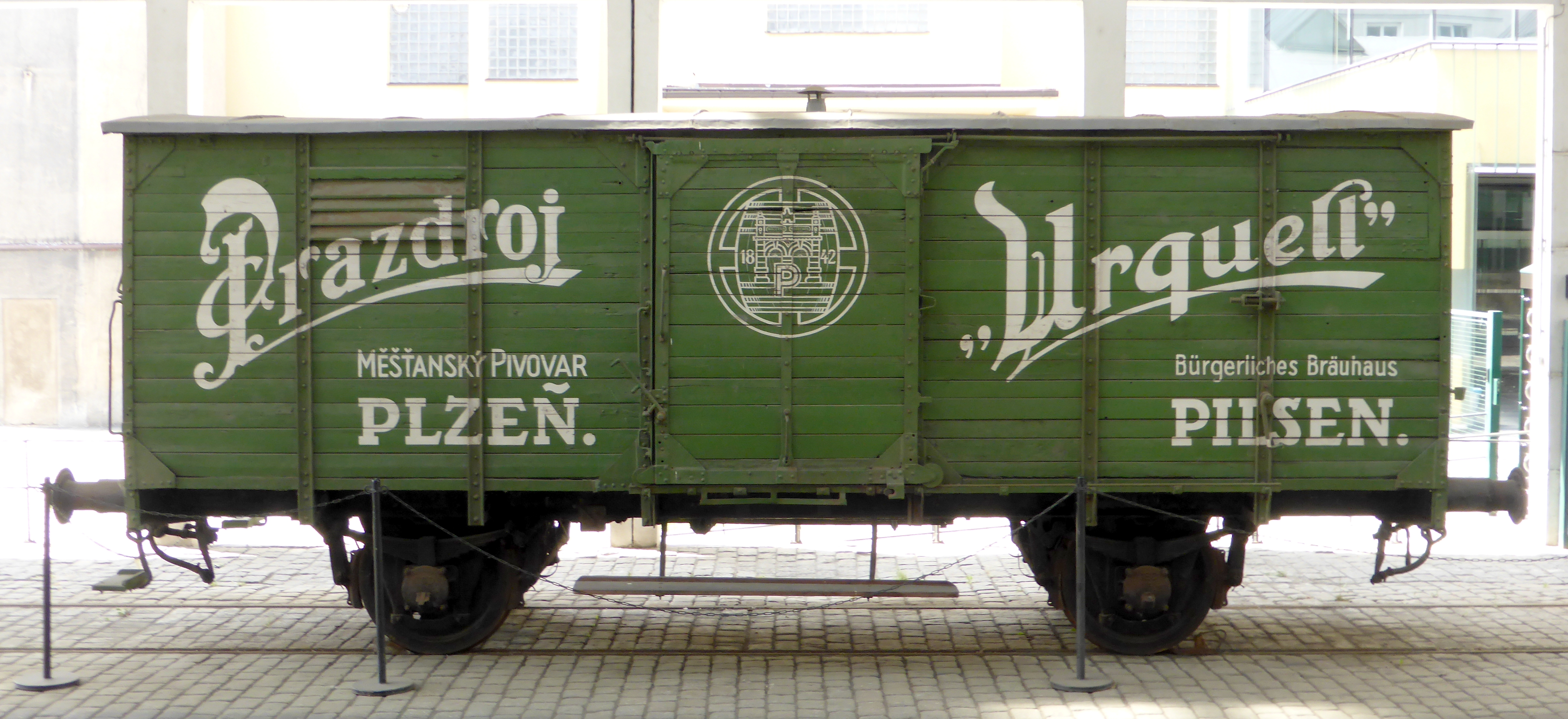
Pilsner Urquell historical cargo railroad car

Pilsner Urquell has been brewed in the same brewery using the same recipe and traditional methods, like triple decoction and parallel brewing in wooden lagering barrels for over 175 years.

- 1295 City of Pilsen established, beginnings of brewing.
- 1307 First recorded mention of the existence of an actual brewery with malt house.
- 1839 Burghers in Plzeň decide to found the Burgess' Brewery (Bürgerbrauerei, Měšťanský pivovar).
- 15 September 1839 – autumn 1840 Construction of the Burgess' Brewery, forerunner of today's brewery.
- 5 October 1842 First brew of Bavarian type beer, bottom-fermented beer, so-called pale lager.
- 1 March 1859 "Pilsner Bier" brand name registered at the Chamber of Commerce and Trade in Plzeň.
- 2nd half of 19th century Brewery expands in Europe, first exports from Plzeň to America.
- 1869 Competitor founded as First Stock Brewery (První akciový pivovar), today known as Gambrinus.
- 1898 New Urquell - Prazdroj trade mark created.
- 1910 Světovar - Český Plzeňský pivovar akciové společnosti v Plzni.
- 1913 Output over 100 million litres of beer, commercial representation in 34 countries.
- 1925–1933 Merger of several Plzeň breweries.
- 1933 Two breweries remain in Plzeň: Měšťanský pivovar and Plzeňské akciové pivovary (PAP), with the majority of PAP shares being owned by Měšťanský pivovar.
- 1 June 1945 National administration for companies owned by Měšťanský pivovar in Plzeň. National administration took over management of the Měšťanský pivovar (afterwards known as Prazdroj) and PAP (Gambrinus).
- 13 September 1946 Nationalization of both breweries and creation of a single national company, Plzeňské pivovary.
- 1 Jun 1964 Formation of the company Západočeské pivovary with registered office in Plzeň. Creation of the national company Plzeňský Prazdroj with regard to ownership of trademarks and contact with customers abroad.
- November 1989 Fundamental changes initiated for the company's entire organisation.
- 1 May 1992 Following privatization the joint stock company Plzeňské pivovary, a.s. is established. Major investment, technological development, rise in output and exports, development of business and distribution network, marketing.
- 1994 Formation of joint stock company Plzeňský Prazdroj.
- 1999 Merger approved with the companies Pivovar RADEGAST a. s., and Pivovar Velké Popovice a. s.
- 1999 Plzeňský Prazdroj, a. s. becomes part of South African Breweries, subsequently called SABMiller.
- Apr 2002 Pilsner Urquell was voted beer of the year at the Helsinki Beer Festival.
- 30 September 2002 merger completed with the companies Pivovar RADEGAST a. s., and Pivovar Velké Popovice a. s. This resulted in the formation of a single joint stock company called Plzeňský Prazdroj, a. s.
- 21 December 2016, agreement of sale to Asahi Group Holdings was concluded in March 2017. As part of agreements with regulators before Anheuser-Busch InBev was allowed to acquire SABMiller in 2016, Pilsner Urquell was sold to Japan-based Asahi Breweries in 2017.

== Products ==
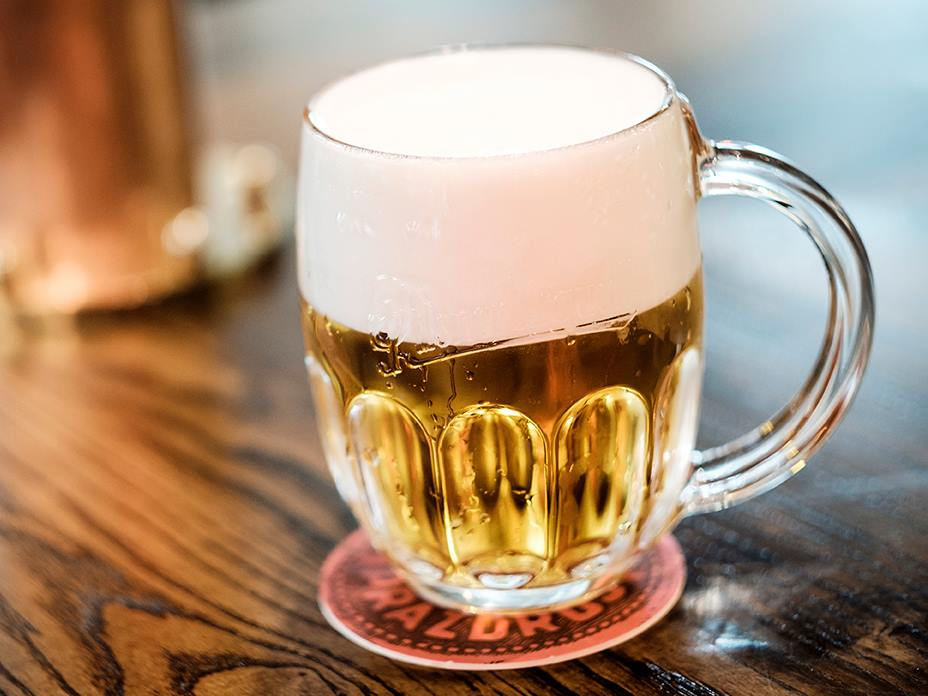
A mug of Pilsner Urquell lager

- Pilsner Urquell, pale lager and flagship of the brand, has created new category of beer (Pilsner, Pils), contains 4.4% ABV (Czech: 11° or Ležák)
- Gambrinus Original, a pale draught beer with 4.3% ABV (Czech: 10° or Výčepní)
- Gambrinus Plná, a pale lager with 5.2% ABV (Czech: 12° or Ležák)
- Gambrinus Unpasteurized 10°, an unpasteurized draught beer with 4.3% ABV (Czech: Nepasterizovaná 10°)
- Gambrinus Unpasteurized 12°, an unpasteurized pale lager with 5.0% ABV (Czech: Nepasterizovaná 12°)
- Gambrinus Unfiltered, an unfiltered yeast pale lager with 4.95% ABV (Czech: Nefiltrované)
- Velkopopovický Kozel
- Radegast
- Birell, a non-alcoholic beer
- Excellent (beer)
- Frisco, a flavored cider
- Kingswood Cider
- Master, beer specialties
- Kopparberg Cider
- Klasik (beer)
- Primus (beer)

== Gallery ==
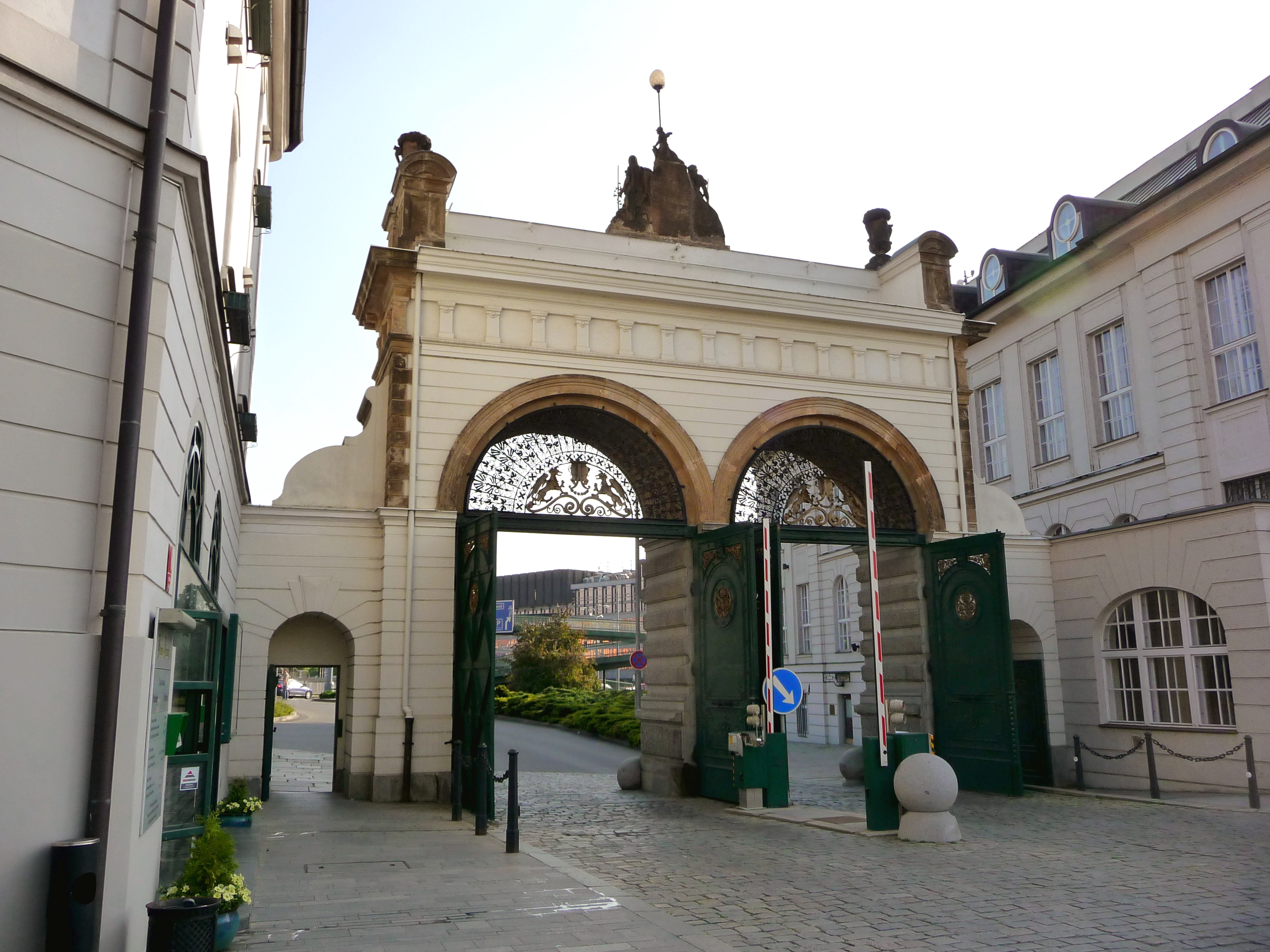
Rear side of main gate

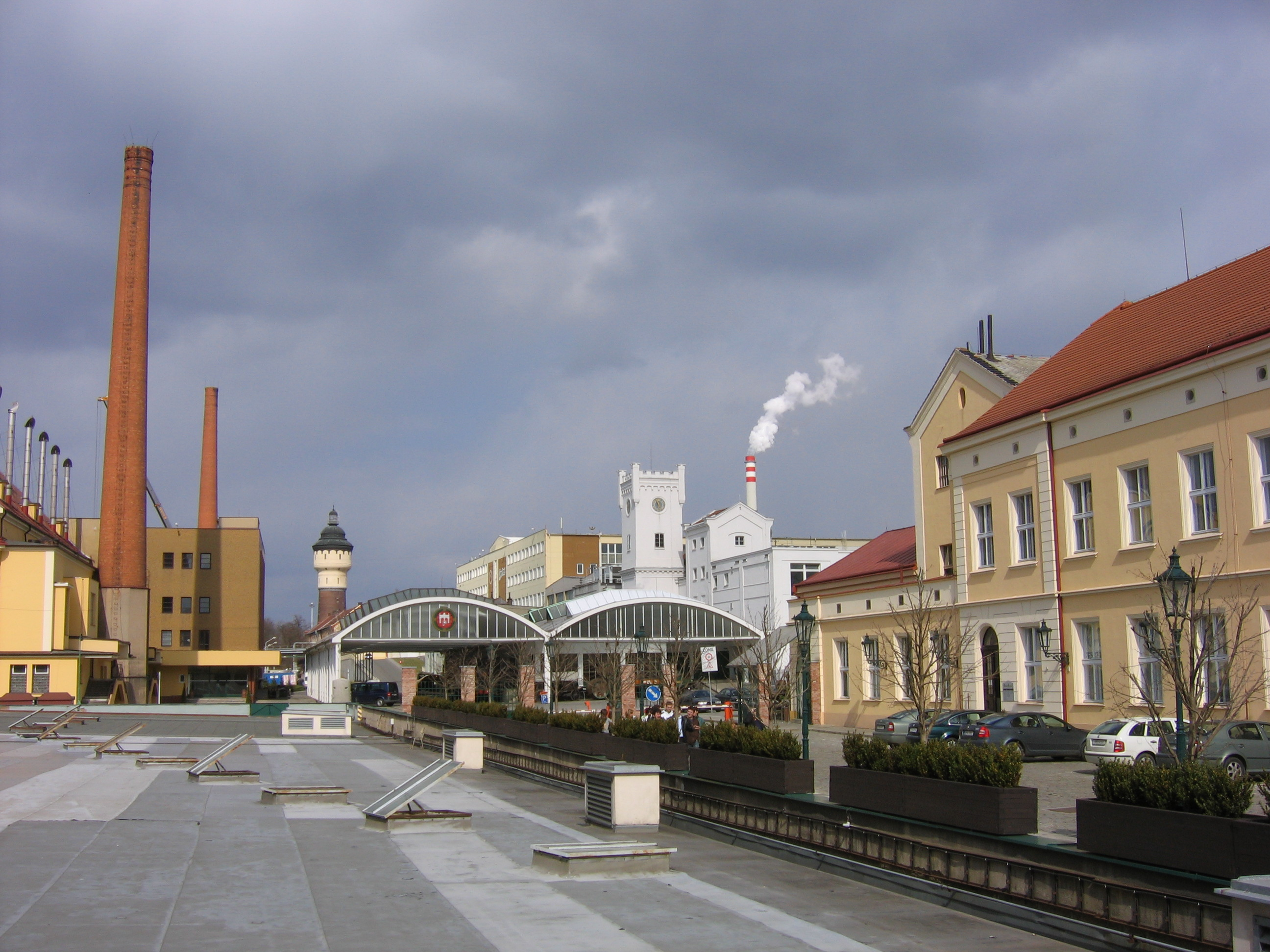
Brewery complex

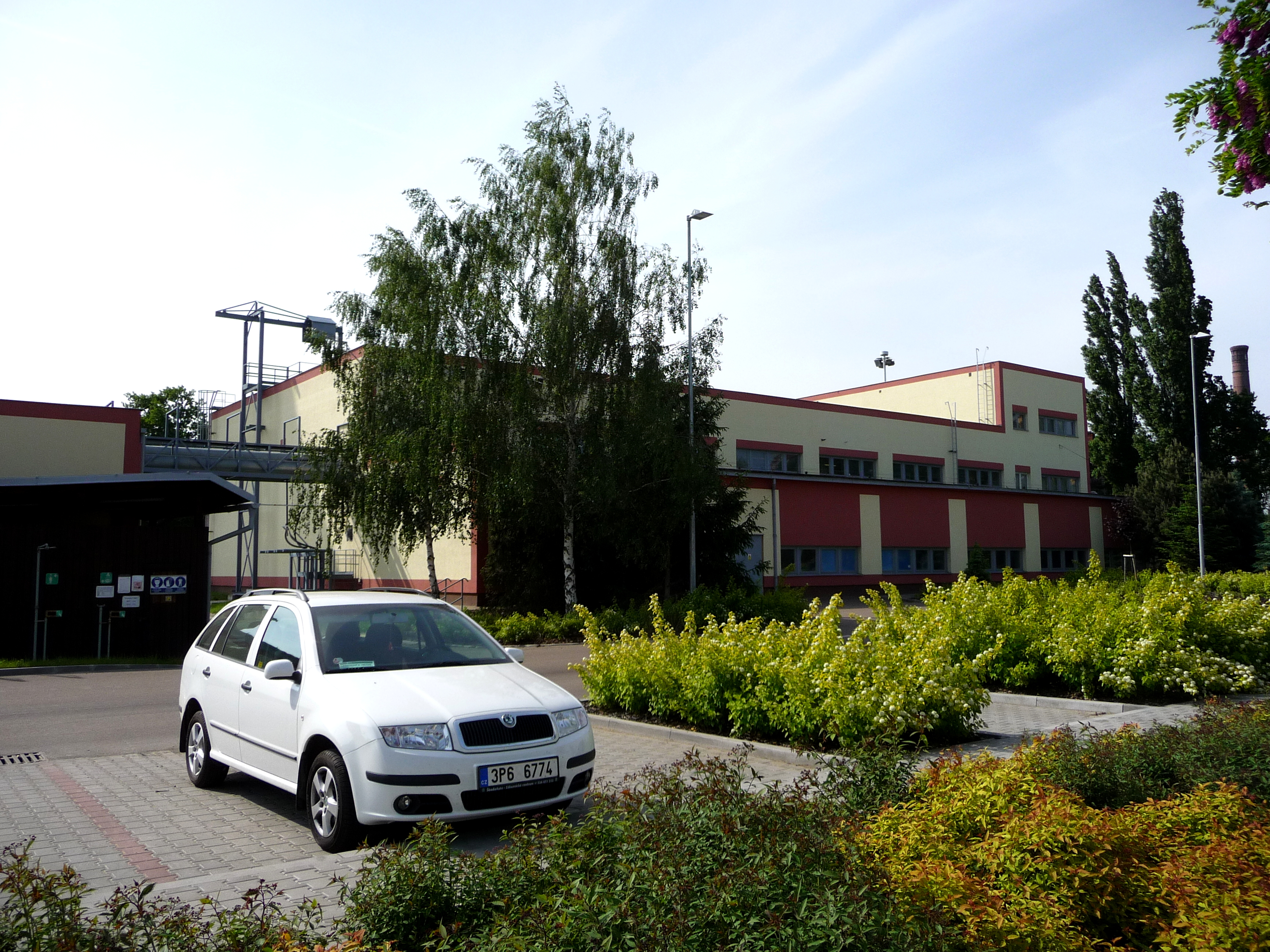
On site water purification plant

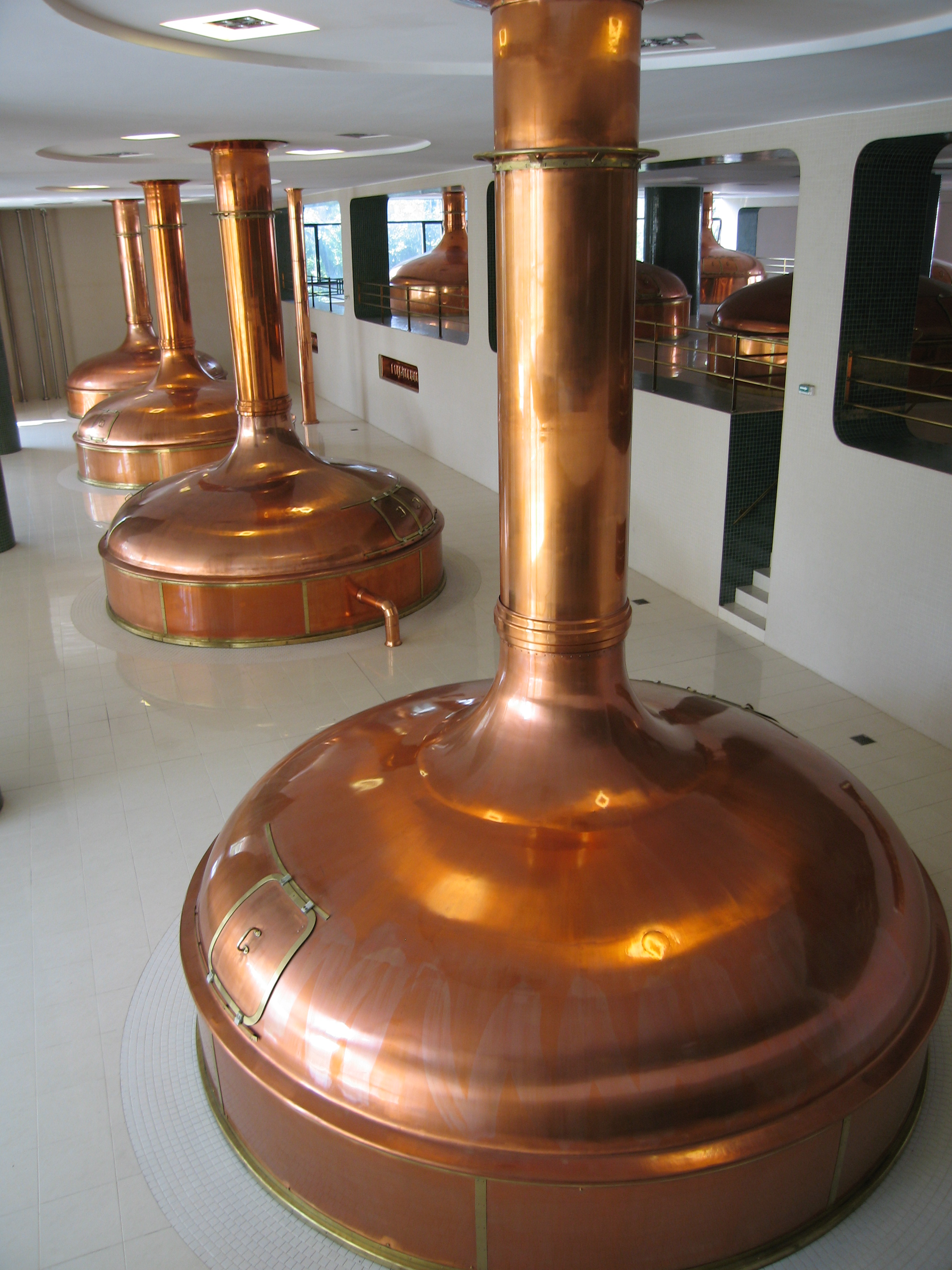
New brew house

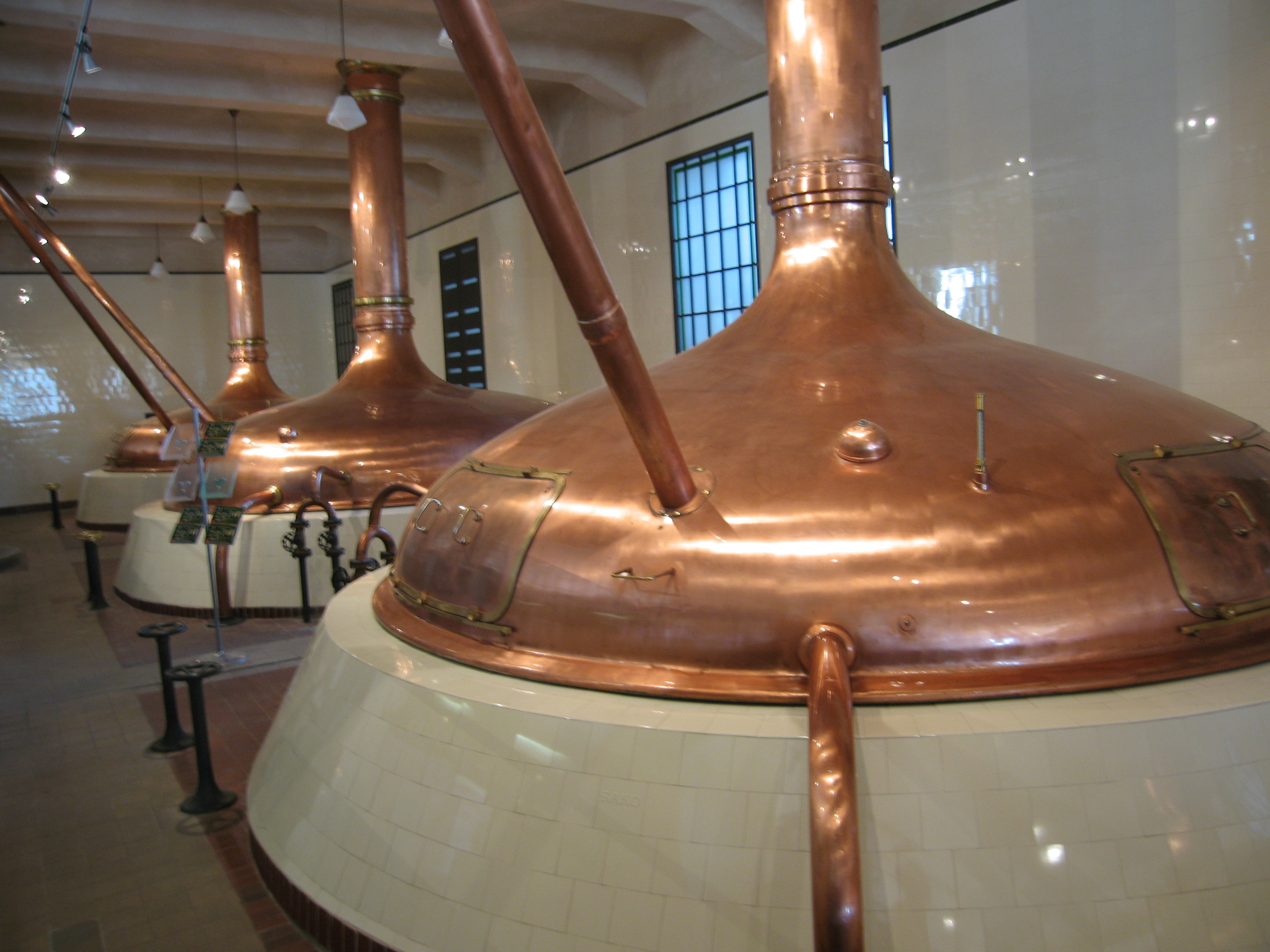
Old brew house

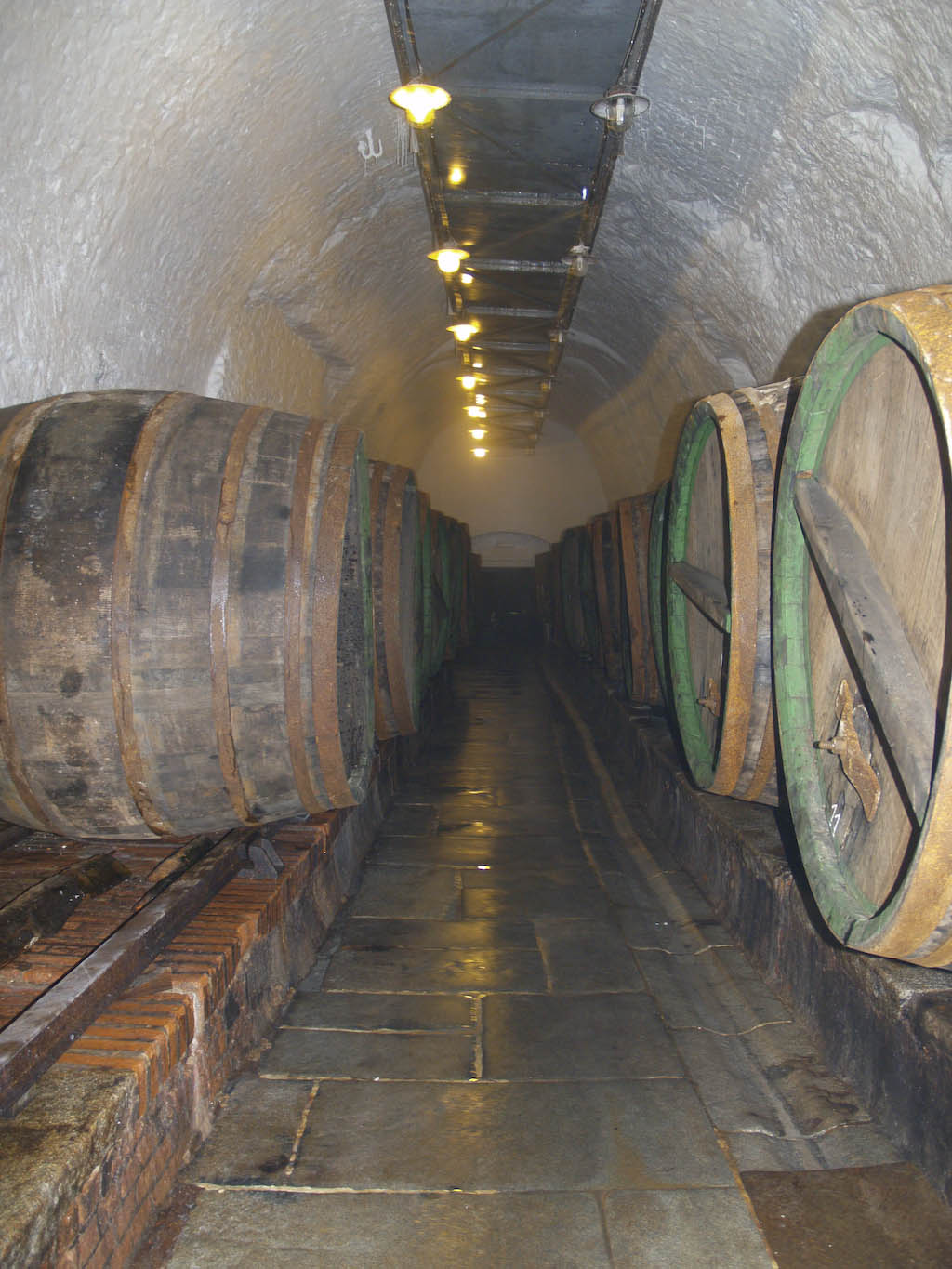
Lagering caves

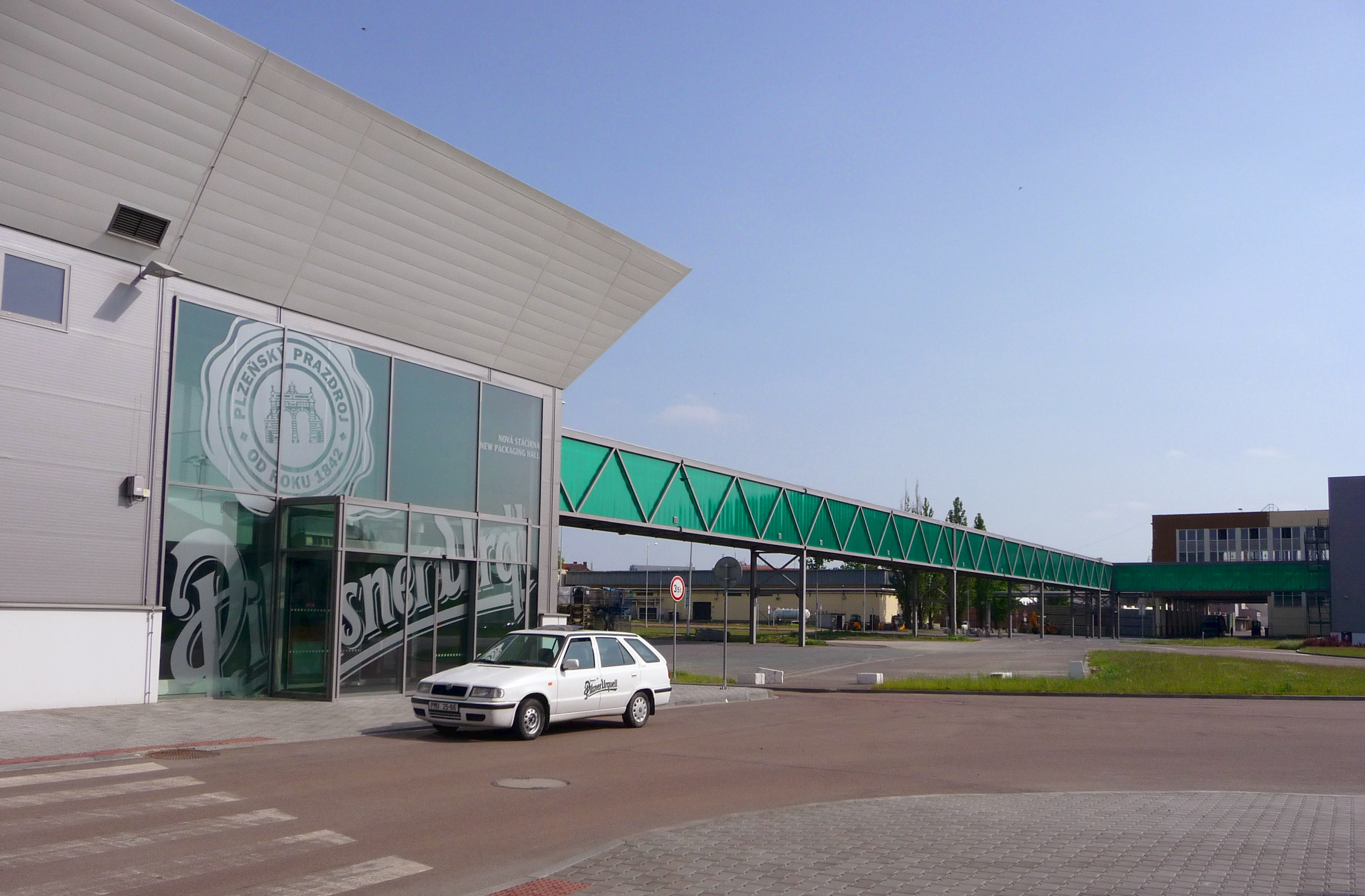
New Packaging Hall (Nová stáčírna)

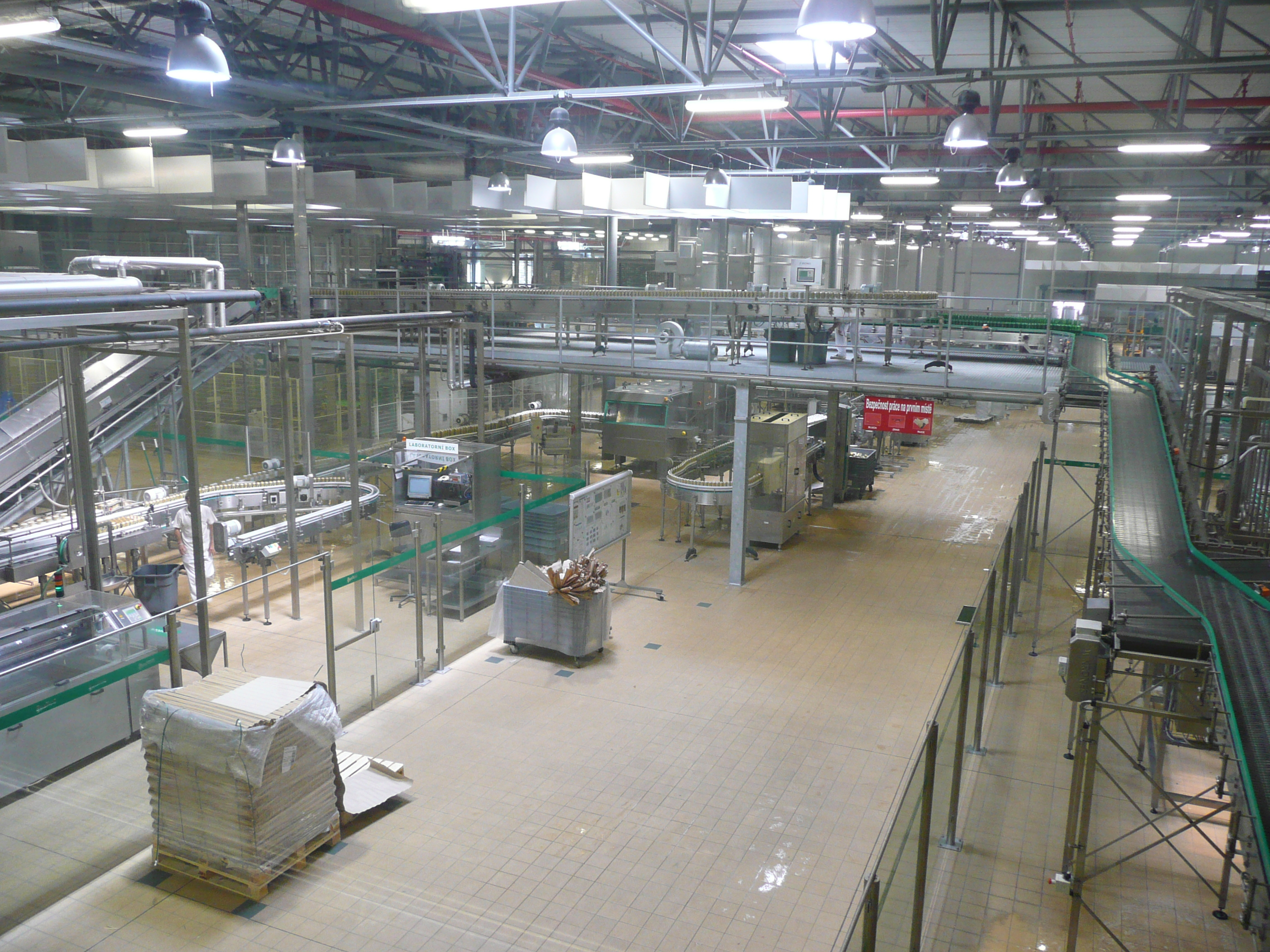
Overhead view of packaging lines

== Museum ==
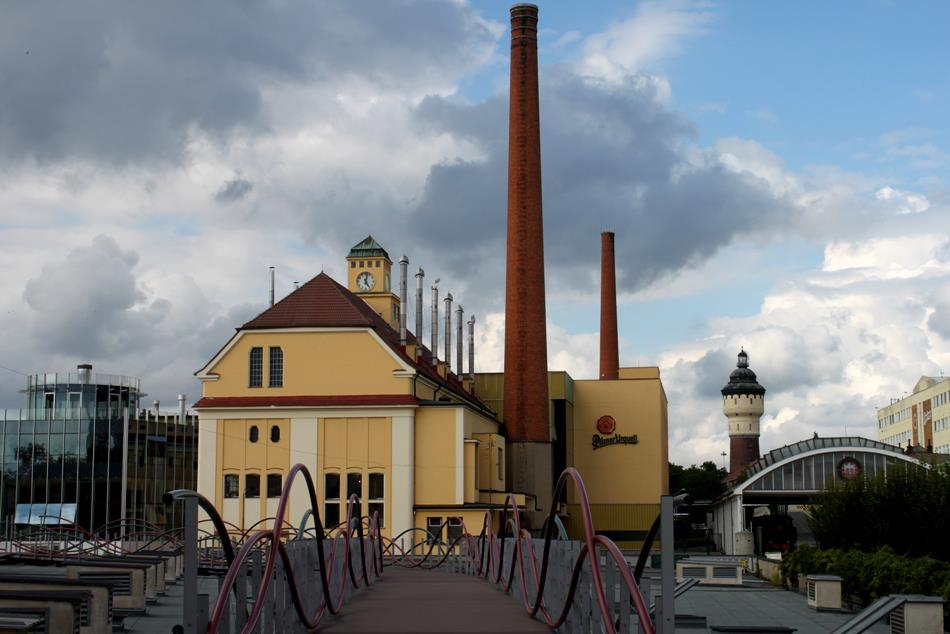
Traditional fermenting building (center) and modern fermenting building (left) in Pilsner Urquell Brewery

A brewery museum ("Pivovarské muzeum") has been set up near the brewery in the authentic medieval brewing house with malt house, which has been declared a cultural monument. It includes the late Gothic malt house, kiln, original drying shed and two-level laying-down cellars with ice-cellar, which are hewn from the Plzeň substrata. The exhibition covers Plzeň's most ancient history, the development of crafts, the emergence and growth of the guilds, the beginnings and development of brewing, malting, the craft of cooper, haulage and catering.

The tour includes a replica of a pub from the turn of the 19th and 20th centuries and a laboratory from the second half of the 19th century. The city walls have been opened with an example of the cultivation of barley and hops.

The museum has become an anchor for the European Route of Industrial Heritage.

== Pilsner Fest ==
Pilsner Fest is a two-day beer festival held each year by the brewery, with music by local bands on four stages in the town.

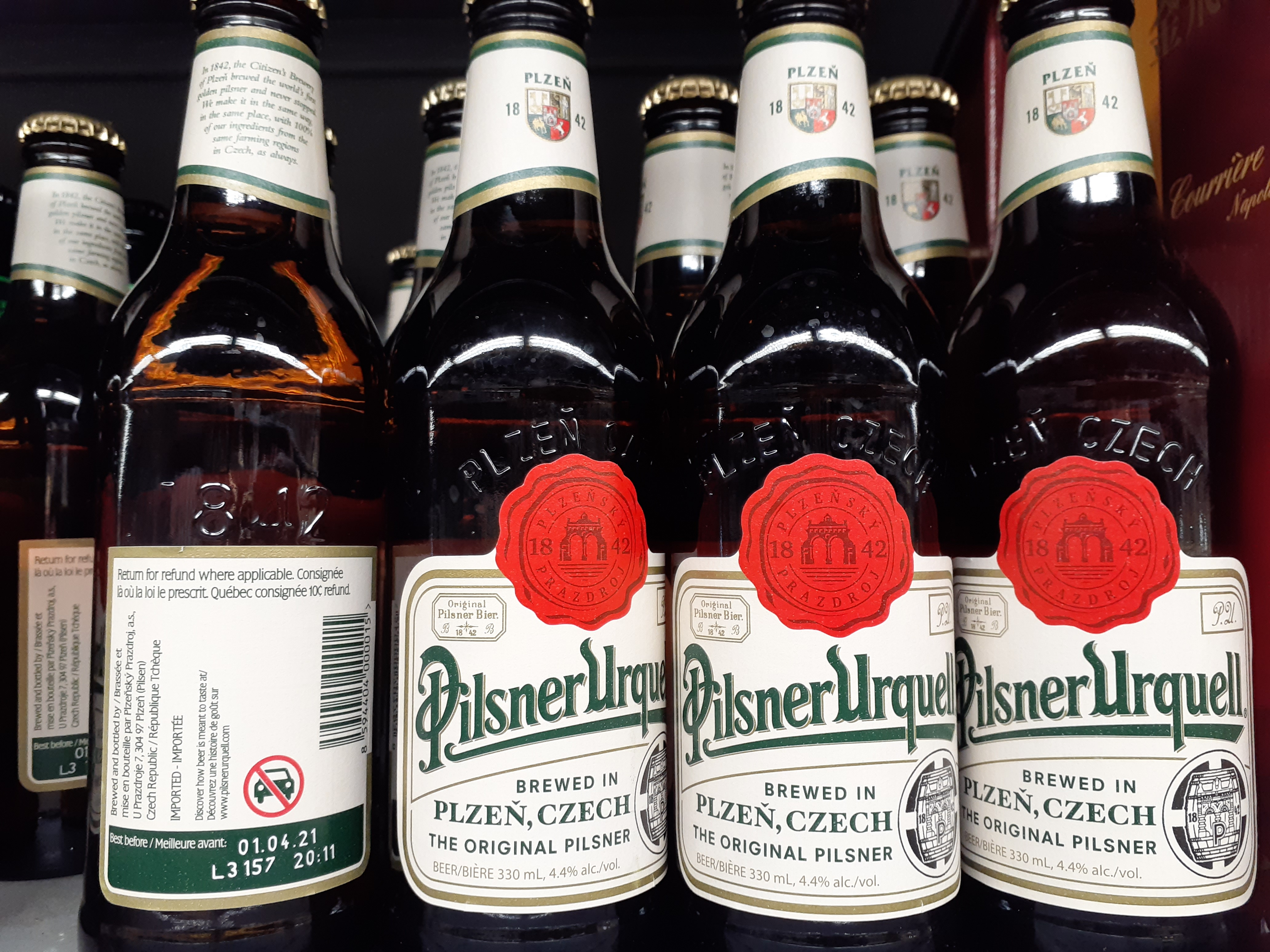
Bottled Pilsner Urquell for sale in Hong Kong

== See also ==
- Budweiser
- Budweiser Bürgerbräu (since 1795)
- Budějovický Budvar (since 1895)
- Beer in the Czech Republic
- Frisco (soft drink) - product by Pilsner
- Pilsen Fest
