= Pale lager =

Light-colored low-temperature beer

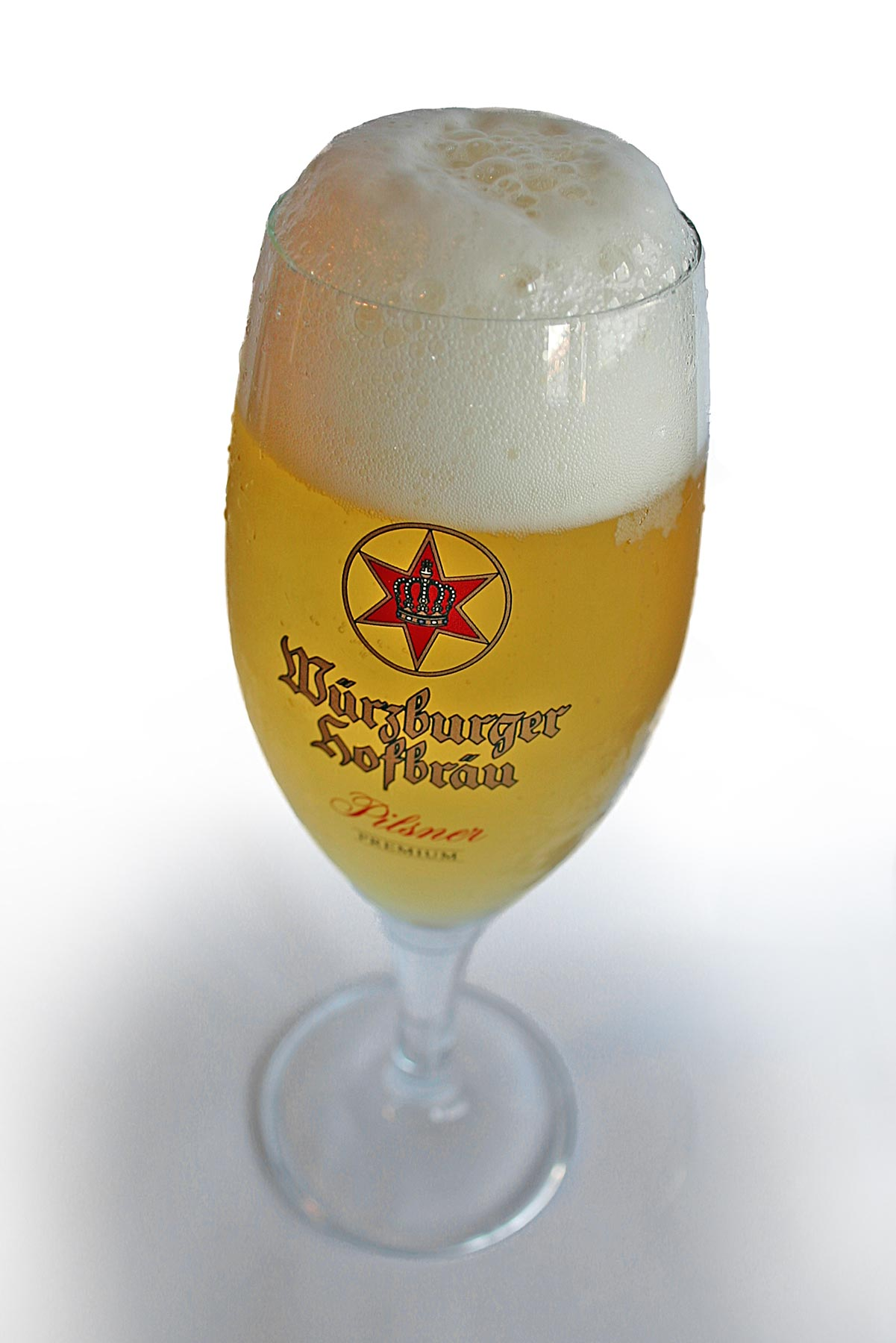
- Würzburger Hofbräu, a typical pale lager
- Country of origin: Germany, Austria
- Yeast type: Bottom-fermenting

Pale lager is a pale-to-golden lager beer with a well-attenuated body and a varying degree of noble hop bitterness.

In the mid-19th century, Gabriel Sedlmayr took British pale ale brewing and malt making techniques back to the Spaten Brewery in Germany and applied them to existing lagering methods. The resulting beers gradually spread around the globe to become the most common form of beer consumed in the world today.

== History ==
In the period 1820–1830, a brewer named Gabriel Sedlmayr II the Younger, whose family was running the Spaten Brewery in Bavaria, went around Europe to improve his brewing skills. When he returned, he used what he had learned to get a more stable and consistent lager beer. The Bavarian lager was still different from the widely known modern lager; due to the use of dark malts it was quite dark, representing what is now called Dunkel beer or the stronger variety, bock beer. This technique was applied by Josef Groll in the city of Pilsen, Bohemia, Austria-Hungary, (now Czech Republic) using less-roasted grains, resulting in the first pale lager Pilsner Urquell in 1842.

== Description ==
Pale lagers tend to be dry, lean, clean-tasting and crisp. Flavors may be subtle, with no traditional beer ingredient dominating the others. Hop character (bitterness, flavor, and aroma) ranges from negligible to a dry bitterness from noble hops. The main ingredients are water, Pilsner malt and noble hops, though some brewers use adjuncts such as rice or corn to lighten the body of the beer.

Depending on style, pale lagers typically contain 4-6% alcohol by volume.

== Variations ==
=== Pilsner ===
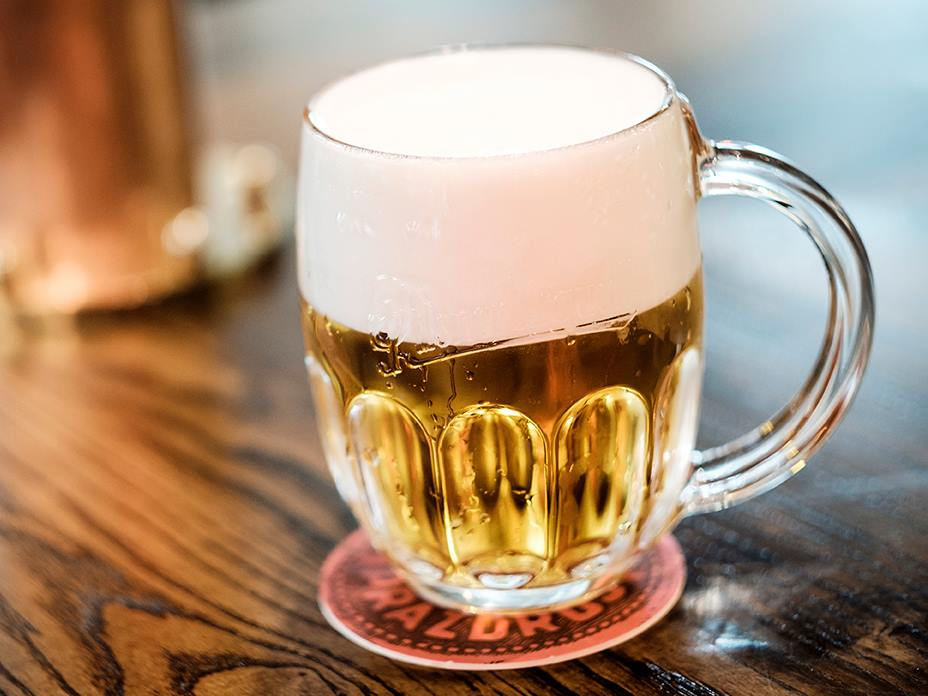
The first Pilsner beer, Pilsner Urquell, as it is brewed today

Pale lager was developed in the mid-19th century, when Gabriel Sedlmayr took some British pale ale brewing techniques back to the Spaten Brewery in Germany, and started to modernize continental brewing methods. In 1842, a new modern lager brewery Měšťanský pivovar was built in Plzeň (German: Pilsen), a city in western Bohemia in what is now the Czech Republic. The first known example of a golden lager, Pilsner Urquell, was brewed there by Josef Groll. This beer proved so successful that other breweries followed the trend, using the name Pilsner. Breweries now use the terms "lager" and "Pilsner" interchangeably, though pale lagers from the Czech Republic and Germany categorized as pilsner tend to have more evident noble hop aroma and dry finish than other pale lagers.

=== Dortmunder Export ===
With the success of Pilsen's golden beer, the town of Dortmund in Germany started brewing pale lager in 1873. As Dortmund was a major brewing center, and the town breweries grouped together to export the beer beyond the town, the brand name Dortmunder Export became known.

=== Helles ===
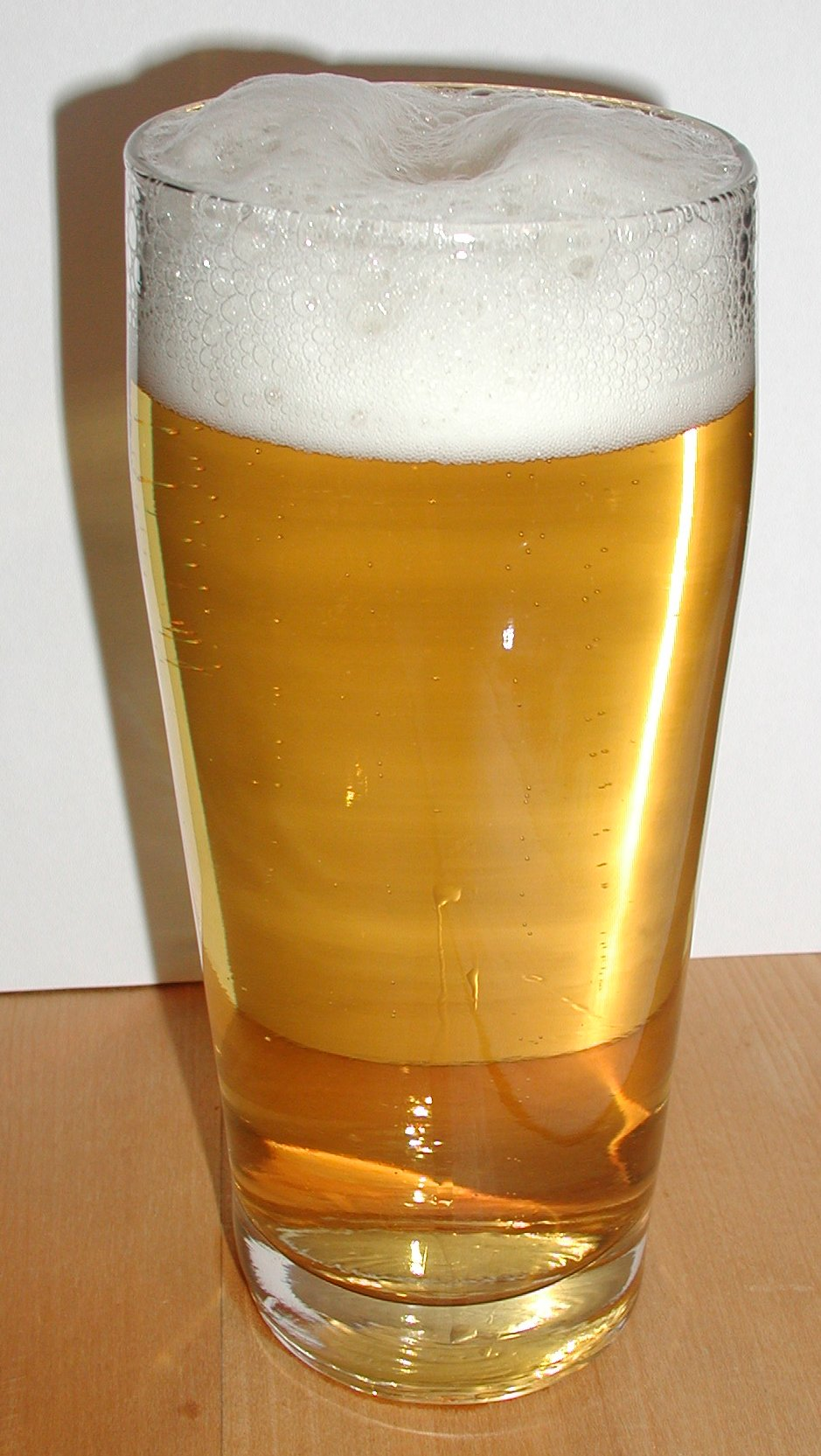
A typical Bavarian helles

"Helles" or "hell" is a traditional German pale lager, produced chiefly in Southern Germany, particularly Munich. The German word hell can be translated as "bright", "light", or "pale". In 1894, the Spaten Brewery in Munich noticed the commercial success of the pale lagers Pilsner and Dortmunder Export; Spaten utilized the methods that Sedlmayr had brought home over 50 years earlier to produce their own pale lager they named helles in order to distinguish it from the darker, sweeter Dunkelbier or dunkles Bier ("dark beers") from that region. Initially other Munich breweries were reluctant to brew pale-coloured beer, though, as the popularity of pale beers grew, so other breweries in Munich and Bavaria gradually began brewing pale lager either using the name hell or Pils.

Pale lagers termed helles, hell, Pils or gold remain popular in Munich and Bavaria, with a local inclination to use low levels of hops, and an abv in the range 4.7% to 5.4%; Munich breweries which produce such pale lagers include Löwenbräu, Staatliches Hofbräuhaus in München, Augustiner Bräu, Paulaner, and Hacker-Pschorr, with Spaten-Franziskaner-Bräu producing a 5.2% abv pale lager called Spaten Münchner Hell.

=== American lager ===
The earliest known brewing of pale lager in the United States was in the Old City section of Philadelphia in 1840, by John Wagner, using yeast from his native Bavaria. Modern American lagers are still widely made, in a market dominated by large breweries such as Anheuser-Busch and Molson-Coors (formerly MillerCoors). Lightness of body is the norm, both by design and since it allows the use of a high percentage of less expensive, light-bodied rice or corn. Some American lagers are brewed as calorie-reduced light beers.

=== Australian lager ===
Beer from XXXX, various Tooheys' brands, Victoria Bitter (which is classified as a lager), West End, Swan, and Foster's Lager, are Australian lagers. An Australian lager with an amber hue and slightly bitter flavour typically brewed with Pride of Ringwood hops or its descendants.

=== Dry beer ===
The term "dry beer" has varied with time and region, and still does.

Though the term was not yet used, the first dry beer, Gablinger's Diet Beer, was released in 1967, developed by Joseph Owades at Rheingold Breweries in Brooklyn. Owades developed an enzyme that could further break down starches, so that the finished product contained fewer residual carbohydrates and was lower in food energy.

A marketing term for a fully attenuated pale lager, originally used in Japan by Asahi Breweries in 1987, "karakuchi" (辛口, dry), was taken up by the American brewer Anheuser-Busch in 1988 as "dry beer" for the Michelob brand, Michelob Dry. This was followed by other "dry beer" brands such as Bud Dry, though the marketing concept was not considered a success. In Australia, the term "Dry" is used for beers that are lower in carbohydrates.

While all lagers are well attenuated, a more fully fermented (i.e. "dry") pale lager in Germany goes by the name Diät-Pils or Diätbier. "Diet" in the instance not referring to being "light" in calories or body, rather its sugars are fully fermented into alcohol, allowing the beer to be targeted to diabetics due to its lower carbohydrate content. Because the available sugars are fully fermented, dry beers often have a higher alcohol content, which, if desired, may be reduced in the same manner as low-alcohol beers.

Since the 2012 revisions to the Diätverordnung (Ordinance on Dietetic Foodstuffs), it is no longer permitted to label beer as "Diät" in Germany, but it may be advertised as "suitable for diabetics". Prior to this change, a Diätbier could contain no more than 7.5 g of unfermented carbohydrates per liter (a typical lager contains 30-40 g/L), and the alcohol content could not exceed normal levels (5% ABV).

== Strong lager ==
Pale lagers that exceed an abv of around 5.8% are variously termed bock, malt liquor/super strength lager, Oktoberfestbier/Märzen, or European strong lager.

=== Bock ===
Bock is a strong lager which has origins in the Hanseatic town of Einbeck in Germany. The name is a corruption of the medieval German brewing town of Einbeck, but also means billy goat (buck) in German. The original bocks were dark beers, brewed from highly roasted malts. Modern bocks can be dark, amber or pale in color. Bock was traditionally brewed for special occasions, often religious festivals such as Christmas, Easter or Lent.

=== Malt liquor ===
Malt liquor is an American term referring to a strong pale lager brewed to an unnaturally high alcohol content through the addition of such high-carbohydrate adjuncts as corn, rice, and sugar. In the UK, similarly made beverages are called super-strength lager.

=== Oktoberfestbier/Märzen ===
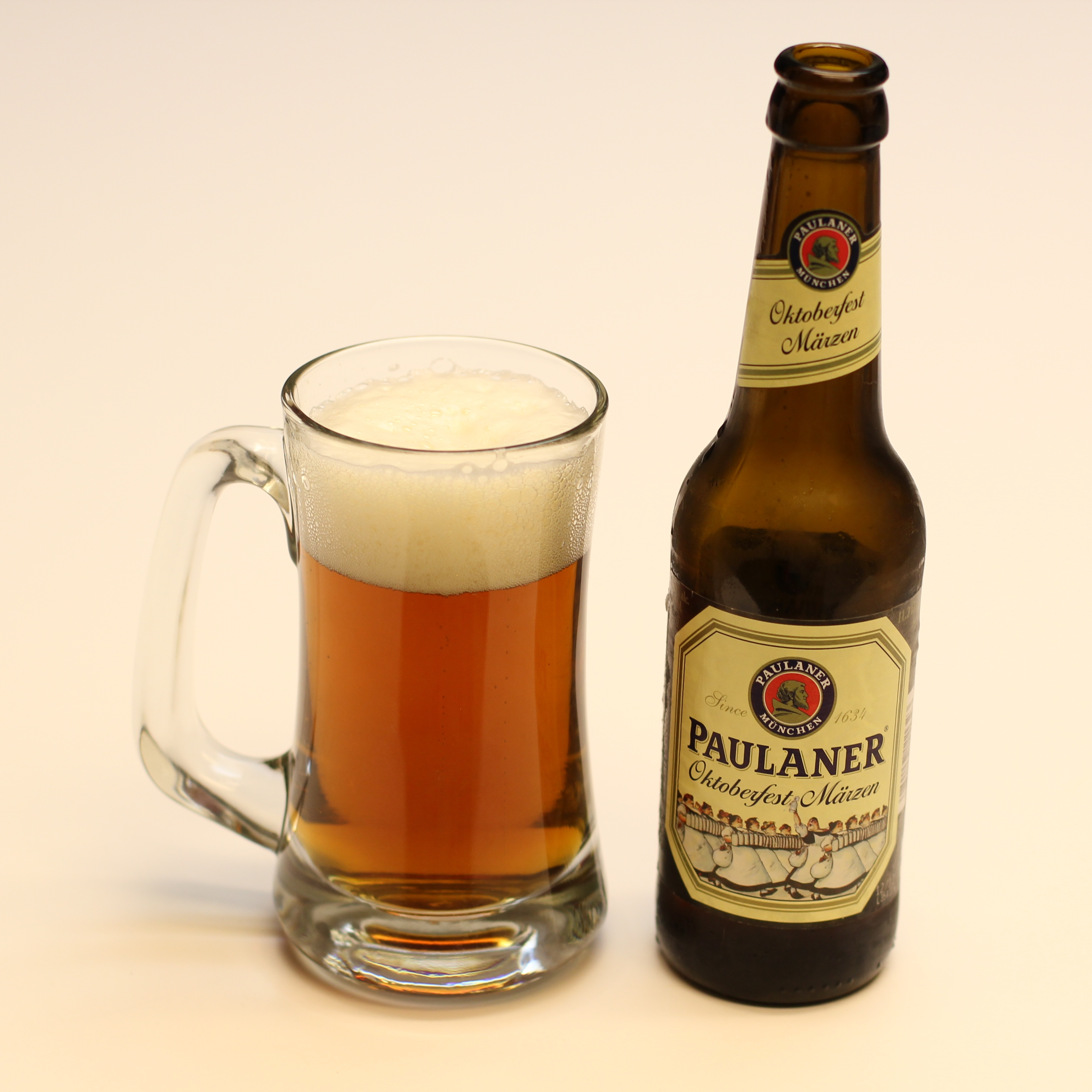
A mug of Paulaner Oktoberfest beer

Oktoberfest is a German festival dating from 1810, and Oktoberfestbiers are the beers that have been served at the festival since 1818, and are supplied by six breweries: Spaten, Löwenbräu, Augustiner-Bräu, Hofbräu-München, Paulaner and Hacker-Pschorr. Traditionally Oktoberfestbiers were lagers of around 5.5 to 6 abv called Märzen, brewed in March and allowed to ferment slowly during the summer months. Originally these would have been dark lagers, but from 1872 a strong March brewed version of an amber-red Vienna lager made by Josef Sedlmayr became the favorite Oktoberfestbier. Despite its origins, the color of Märzen - and thus Oktoberfestbier - has become ever lighter since the late 20th century, with many Oktoberfest beers brewed in Munich since 1990 being golden in color; though some Munich brewers still produce darker versions, mostly for export to the United States.

Oktoberfestbier is a registered trademark of the big six Munich breweries, which call themselves the Club of Munich Brewers. Along with other Munich beer, it is protected by the European Union as a Protected Geographical Indication (PGI).
