= August Wagner Breweries =

Regional brewer in Columbus, Ohio

August Wagner Breweries, Inc.
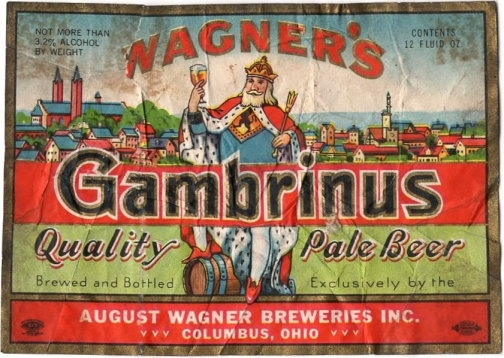
- Company type: Private
- Industry: Beverages
- Founded: Columbus, Ohio in 1906
- Defunct: 1974
- Headquarters: Columbus, Ohio, U.S.
- Area served: Ohio, Indiana and West Virginia

August Wagner Breweries, Inc., was a regional brewer in Columbus, Ohio. It marketed beers in Ohio, Indiana and West Virginia under the Augustiner, Mark V, Robin Hood and Gambrinus brand names, which were once popular products within this region.

== History ==
Like many other brewers, August Wagner immigrated from Germany in the late 1800s. After honing his craft at various brewers in Ohio, he founded the Gambrinus Brewing and Bottling Company in 1906. The company survived Prohibition under the name of "The August Wagner and Sons Products Company, Incorporated." Beer production resumed in 1933 following the repeal of Prohibition and the company was renamed "The August Wagner and Sons Brewing Company". In 1937 the company was renamed "August Wagner Breweries, Inc." August's daughter Helen A. Wagner, Vice President of the brewery, appeared on the CBS game show "What's My Line" on June 3, 1962.

The brewery was owned by the Wagner family until 1968, when it was purchased by a group of investors from Detroit, Michigan. In 1970 August Wagner Breweries purchased The Little Switzerland Brewing Company of Huntington, West Virginia, formerly known as the Fesenmeier Brewing Company. The Huntington plant was closed in 1971 and production was moved to Columbus; the Columbus brewery closed in January, 1974. The brewery was sold to the Dispatch Printing Company, which later razed the brewery and developed office buildings on the property. The Pittsburgh Brewing Company purchased the brand names and other assets of the company and continued distributing beer under the Mark V, Robin Hood and Gambrinus brands.

Gambrinus, the company's most popular brand, was named after King Gambrinus, the legendary king of Flanders reputed for his mythical brewing abilities. A statue of King Gambrinus graced the front of the brewery for many years and continues to stand in the Brewery District in front of the Dispatch-owned office buildings constructed there. August Wagner is credited as the model for that particular statue.

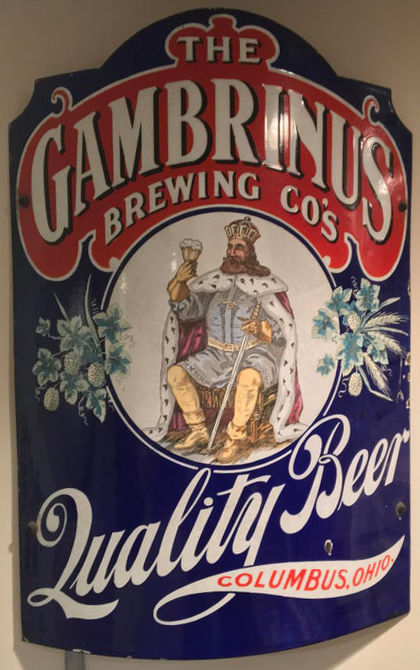
A porcelain corner sign from the early-1900s advertising Gambrinus Beer. The frame on the back of the sign is stamped "1908". The sign was recovered in the 1960s prior to the destruction of a warehouse in Columbus, Ohio.

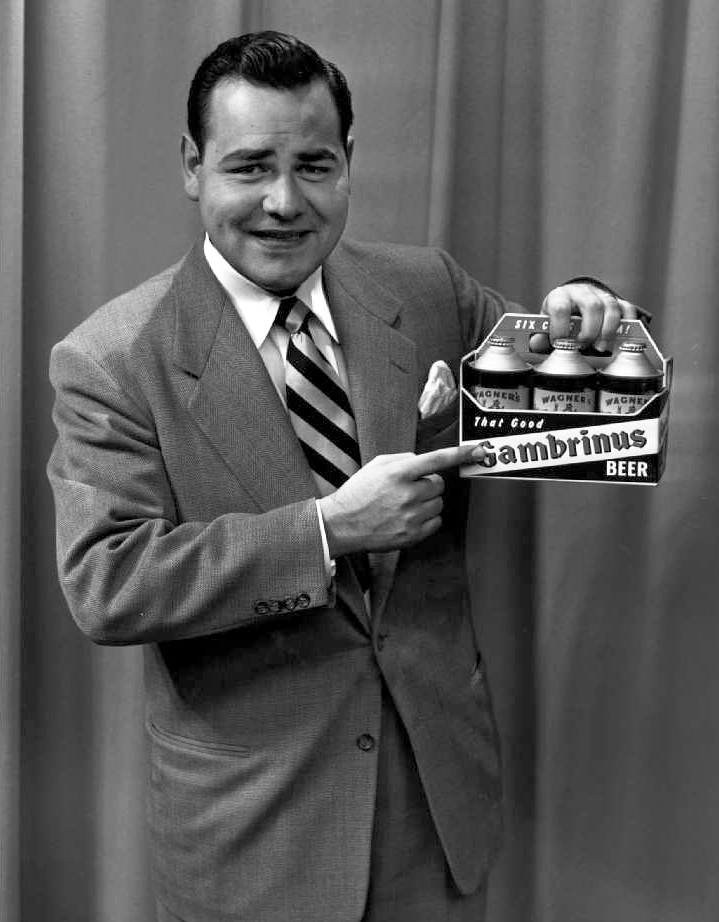
Comedian Jonathan Winters, then known as Johnny Winters, promoting Gambrinus Beer in the early 1950s for August Wagner Breweries, Inc. on WBNS-TV in Columbus, Ohio.

== See also ==
- Gambrinus, patron saint of beer.
