= Asahi Breweries =

Japanese food and beverage company

Asahi Group Holdings, Ltd.

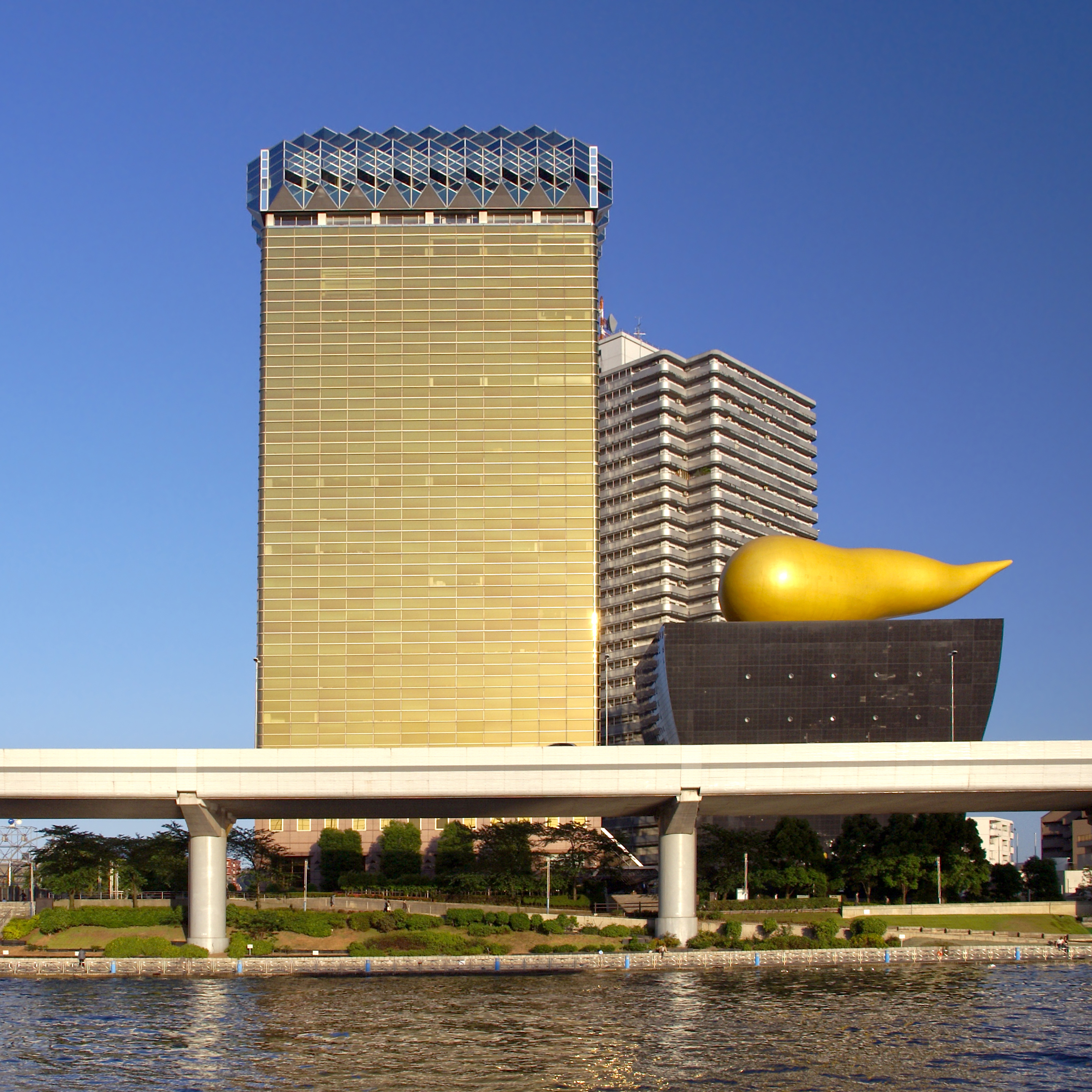
- Asahi's headquarters in Sumida, Tokyo
- Native name: アサヒグループホールディングス株式会社
- Formerly: Asahi Beer Co., Ltd. (1949-1989); Asahi Breweries, Ltd. (1989-2010)
- Type: Public
- Traded as: TYO: 2502; TOPIX Large 70 Component
- Industry: Beverage
- Founded: September 1, 1949; 77 years ago
- Headquarters: Azumabashi, Sumida, Tokyo, Japan
- Key people: Akiyoshi Koji (president and Representative Director, CEO)
- Products: Beer; Beverages
- Revenue: ▲¥2.939 trillion (2024); ¥2.769 trillion (2023)
- Operating income: ▲¥269.052 billion (2024); ¥244.999 billion (2023)
- Net income: ▲¥193.181 billion (2024); ¥166.031 billion (2023)
- Total assets: ▲¥5.403 trillion (2024); ¥5.285 trillion (2023)
- Total equity: ▲¥2.674 trillion (2024); ¥2.465 trillion (2023)
- Subsidiaries: Asahi Breweries; Asahi Soft Drinks; Asahi Group Foods
- Website: asahigroup-holdings.com/en/
- Footnotes; Note to Consolidated Financial Statements 1. Transitioned to International Financial Reporting Standards (IFRS) starting from 2016

The Asahi Group Holdings, Ltd. (アサヒグループホールディングス株式会社, Asahi Gurūpu Hōrudingusu kabushiki gaisha) is a Japanese beverage holding company headquartered in Sumida, Tokyo. In 2024, the group had revenue of JPY 2.9 trillion. Asahi's business portfolio can be segmented as follows: alcoholic beverage business (40.5%), overseas business (32%), soft drinks business (17.2%), food business (5.4%) and "other" business (4.9%). Asahi, with a 37% market share, is the largest of the four major beer brewers in Japan followed by Kirin Beer with 34% and Suntory with 16%. Asahi has a 48.5% share of the Australian beer market. In response to a maturing domestic Japanese beer market, Asahi broadened its geographic footprint and business portfolio through the acquisition of beer businesses in Western Europe and Central Eastern Europe. This has resulted in Asahi having a large market share in many European countries, such as a beer market share of 44% in the Czech Republic, 32% in Poland, 36% in Romania, and 18% in Italy.

== History ==
The predecessor of the company, Asahi Breweries (朝日麦酒株式会社), was established in 1889. In 1893, it was reorganized as Ōsaka Breweries (大阪麦酒株式会社). In 1906, Ōsaka Breweries merged with Nippon Breweries and Sapporo Breweries to form Dai-Nippon Breweries (大日本麦酒株式会社; lit. 'Great Japan Beer Company'). During World War I, German prisoners worked in the brewery.

After World War II, the company was divided under the Elimination of Excessive Concentration of Economic Power Law by the Supreme Commander for the Allied Powers. Asahi Breweries (朝日麦酒株式会社) was separated from Nippon Breweries, which is now Sapporo Breweries. In 1989, it was renamed to katakana (アサヒビール株式会社). In 2011, Asahi Breweries changed its name to Asahi Group Holdings, a holding company, and established Asahi Breweries Ltd as a subsidiary.

In 1990, Asahi acquired a 19.9% stake in Australian brewery giant Elders IXL, which later became the Foster's Group and was subsequently sold to SABMiller.

In 2009, Asahi acquired the Australian beverages unit Schweppes Australia, now known as Asahi Beverages.

In early 2009, Asahi acquired 19.9% of Tsingtao Brewery from Anheuser-Busch InBev for $667 million. The sale made Asahi Breweries, Ltd. the second largest shareholder in Tsingtao behind only the Tsingtao Brewery Group.

In July 2011, Asahi acquired New Zealand juice maker Charlie's and the water and juice divisions of Australian beverage company P&N Beverages.

In August 2011, Asahi acquired New Zealand's Independent Liquor, maker of Vodka Cruiser and other alcoholic beverages, for ¥97.6 billion.

In May 2013, its New Zealand operations expanded with the purchase of retail chain Mill Liquorsave. Also, Asahi acquired the Australian brands and assets of Cricketers Arms and Mountain Goat Brewery in 2013 and 2015, respectively.

The first of these transactions happened as a result of Anheuser-Busch InBev (InBev) agreeing in April 2016 to sell its Dutch business Grolsch Brewery, Italian business Peroni Brewery and the UK's craft Meantime Brewery and SABMiller Brands UK to Asahi; this €2.3 billion deal closed on 12 October 2016. After Inbev's acquisition of SABMiller in October 2016, InBev agreed to sell the former SABMiller Ltd.'s Eastern European businesses and relevant assets in Poland, the Czech Republic, Slovakia, Hungary and Romania to Asahi for US $7.3 billion. The deal closed on 21 December 2016 and included beer brands such as Pilsner Urquell, Velkopopovický Kozel, Topvar, Tyskie, Lech, Dreher and Ursus.

In 2017, the company sold its 19.9% stake of Tsingtao Brewery for $937 million.

In 2019, the company bought Fuller's beer business from Fuller, Smith & Turner plc for an enterprise value of £250 million. The assets sold comprised the entirety of Fuller's beer, cider and soft drinks brewing and production, wine wholesaling, as well as the distribution thereof and also includes the Griffin Brewery, Cornish Orchards, Dark Star Brewing and Nectar Imports.

In May 2020, the Australian Foreign Investment Review Board approved the company's $16 billion bid for Carlton & United Breweries, and the deal will see Asahi ending up with about 48.5 per cent share of the Australian beer market.

In January 2024, Asahi Europe & International (AEI), the international arm of Asahi Group Holdings, acquired Octopi Brewing, a contract beverage production and co-packing facility based in Waunakee, Wisconsin.

In September 2025, a ransomware attack on The Asahi group, caused a system outage and forced the company to halt production at most of its 30 factories. On October 3 it was announced that they were days away from running out of their most popular beer, Asahi Super Dry.

== Brands ==
The company's primary beer, from 1957 through the late 1980s, was Asahi Gold (overtaking Asahi Draft, its original formula, which remains in production). However, Asahi Super Dry, introduced in 1987, is now the company's flagship beer brand.

Asahi Super Dry

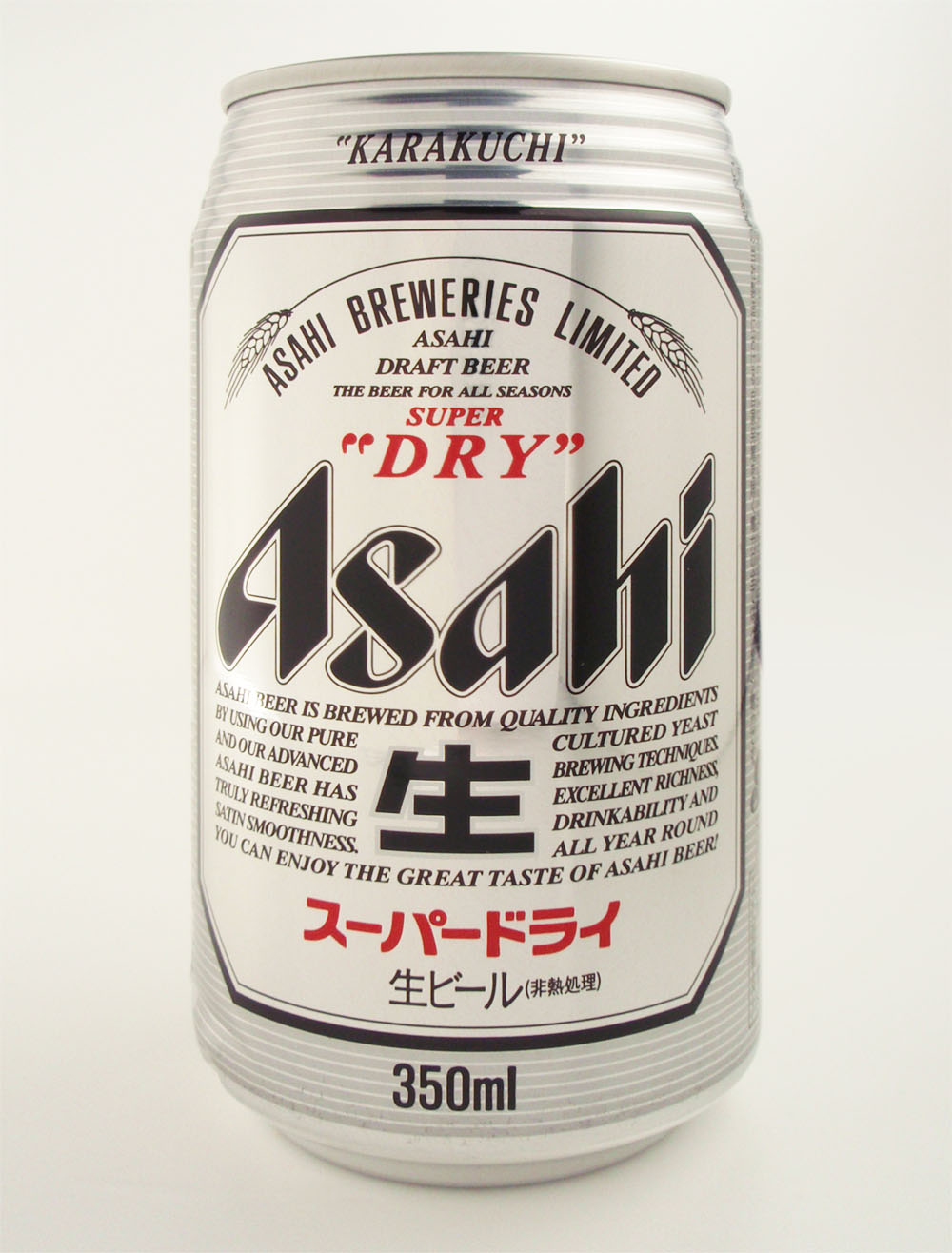
350 ml can

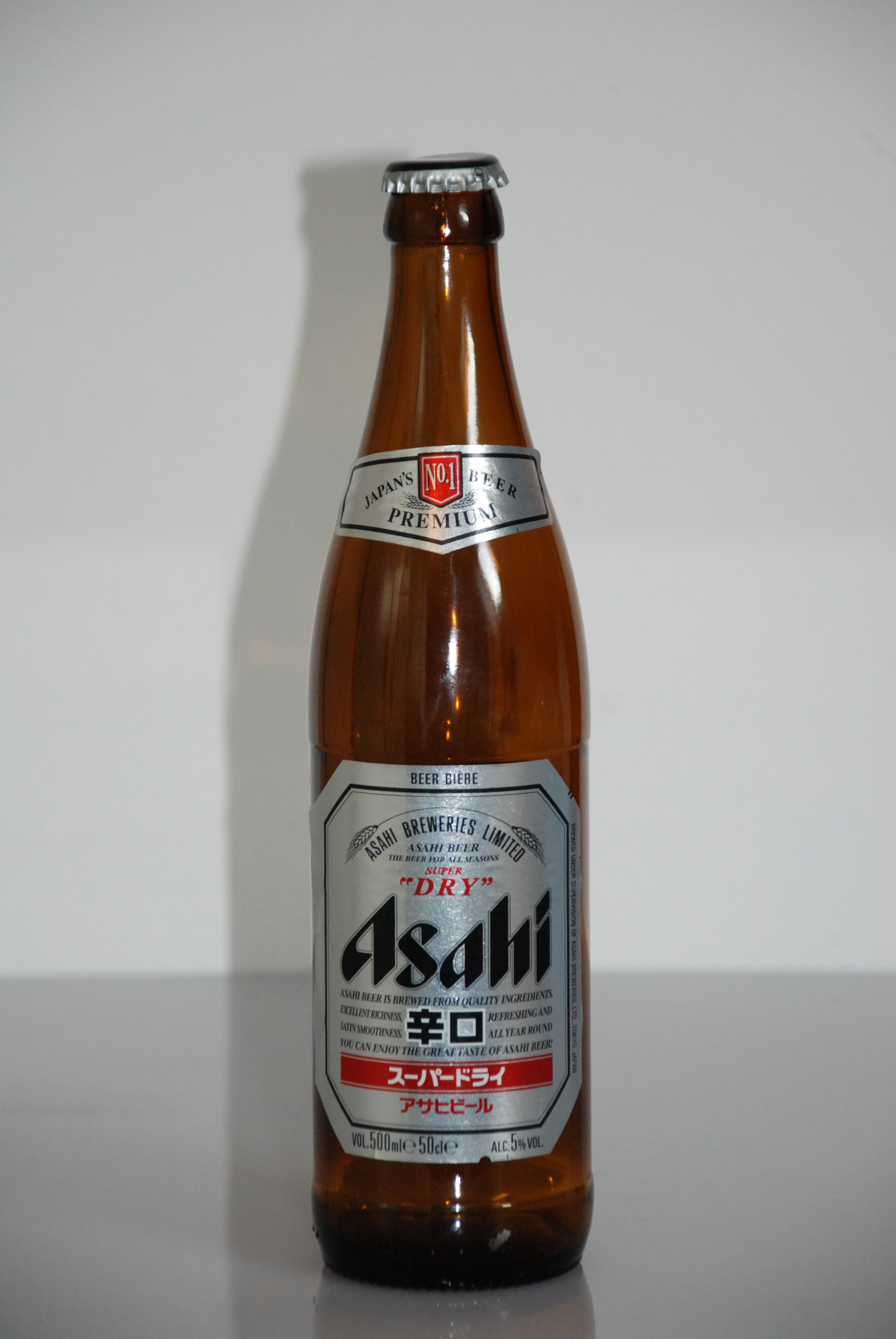
500 ml bottle

Asahi Super Dry, a product that transformed the modern beer industry in Japan, is described as a highly attenuated lager without the heavier malt flavors of competitors' products, with a crisp, dry taste reminiscent of some northern German beers. This highly successful launch led to a significant rise in consumer demand for dry beer and in turn to a dramatic turnaround in Asahi's business performance, surpassing Kirin in terms of both sales and profitability.

Other beers produced include:

- Asahi Draft – Lager (first produced in 1892)
- Asahi Gold – Lager (former flagship product; first produced in 1957)
- Asahi Stout
- Asahi Z – Dry lager
- Asahi Black – a 5% ABV dark lager
- Asahi Prime Time – German Pilsener style lager (only available in Japan)
- Asahi Super Dry - Dry Crystal – a version of Asahi Super Dry with a 3.5% ABV as opposed to the 5% ABV of the original (available in Japan since October 2023)
- Asahi Dry Zero – alcohol-free version of Asahi Super Dry

Brands acquired from Anheuser-Busch InBev:

- Grolsch Brewery
- Šariš Brewery
- Peroni Brewery
- Meantime Brewery
- Gambrinus
- Pilsner Urquell
- Radegast
- Velkopopovický Kozel
- Tyskie
- Lech Browary Wielkopolski
- Dreher Breweries
- Ursus Breweries
- Carlton & United Breweries

== Asahi Beer Hall ==
Asahi Breweries' headquarters in Tokyo were designed by French designer Philippe Starck. The Beer Hall is considered one of Tokyo's most recognizable modern structures.

== See also ==
- Beer in Japan
- Asahi Soft Drinks
