= Pilsner Urquell =

Czech lager beer

- Type: Beer
- Manufacturer: Pilsner Urquell Brewery
- Introduced: 1842; 184 years ago
- Alcohol by volume: 4.4%
- Style: Cool fermented beer
- Website: www.pilsnerurquell.com

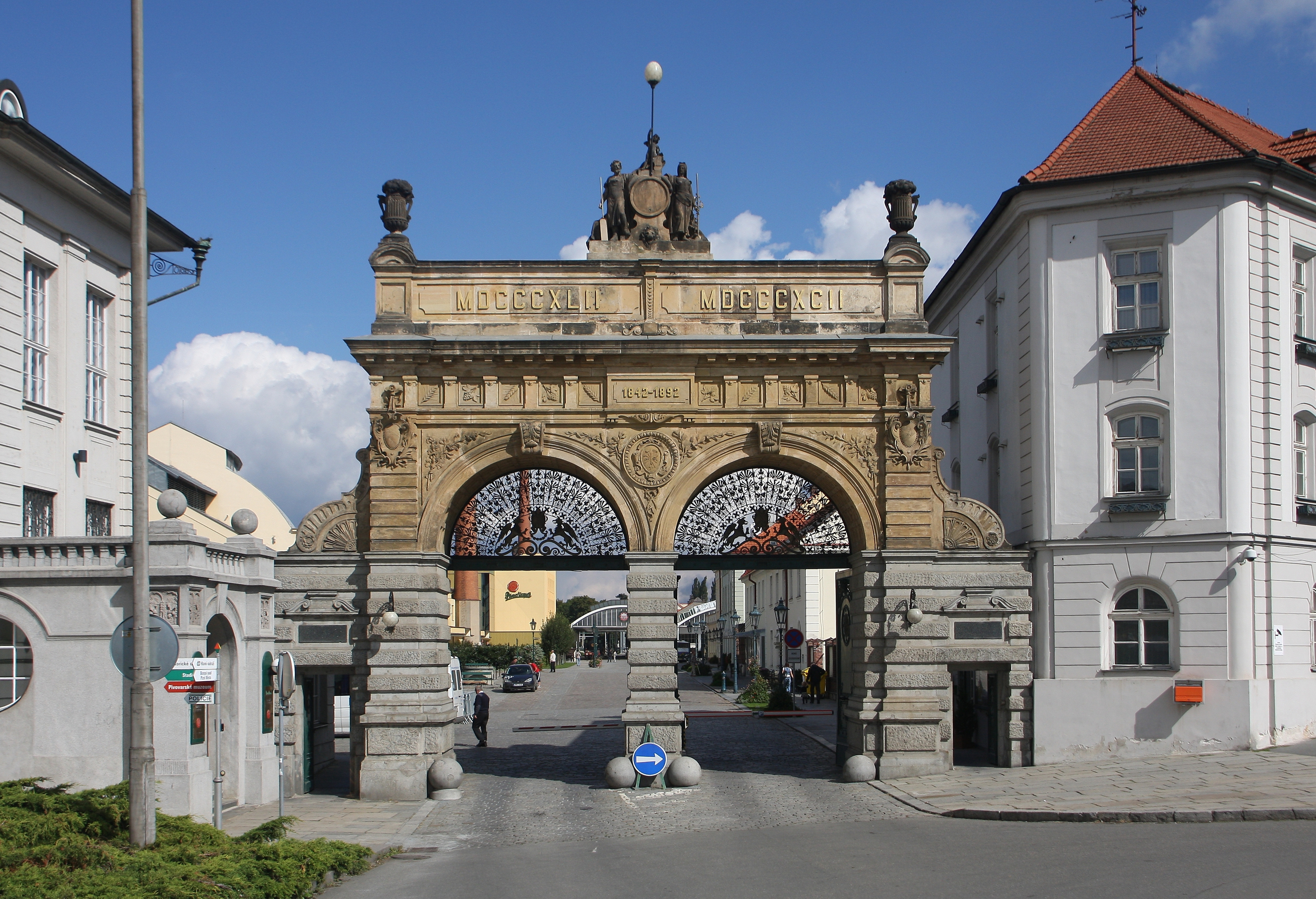
Main gate of the Plzeňský Prazdroj

Pilsner Urquell (German: [ˈpɪlznɐ ˈʔuːɐ̯ˌkvɛl]; Czech: Plzeňský prazdroj [ˈpl̩zɛɲskiː ˈprazdroj]) is a lager beer brewed at Asahi Breweries' Pilsner Urquell Brewery in Plzeň (German name: Pilsen), Czech Republic. Pilsner Urquell was the world's first pale lager, and its popularity meant it was much copied, and named pils, pilsner or pilsener. It is hopped with Saaz hops, a noble hop variety that is a key element in its flavour profile, as is the use of soft water.

Almost all draught Pilsner Urquell is sold filtered, but small quantities are available in limited amounts unfiltered. The majority of the beer is sold in the Czech Republic, Slovakia, Germany and South Korea, it is also sold in China, Japan, the United Kingdom, Canada, United States, Sweden, Hungary, Romania, Austria and Croatia. In recent years, the unpasteurized "tank" version of the beer has become increasingly available. The canned version is available in 330 ml, 355 ml and 500 ml aluminium cans and green or brown bottles.

The brewery was part of the SABMiller group of companies from 1999 to 2017. As part of agreements with regulators before Anheuser-Busch InBev was allowed to acquire SABMiller in 2016, Pilsner Urquell was sold to Japan-based Asahi Breweries in 2017.

== History ==
Pilsner Urquell was the first pale lager, and the name pilsner is often used by its copies. It is characterised by its golden colour and clarity, and was immensely successful: nine out of ten beers produced and consumed in the world are pale lagers based on Pilsner Urquell. The German name, which means 'original source', was adopted as a trademark in 1898.

By 1839, most beer in Bohemia was dark and top fermented. Nonetheless, bottom-fermented lagers were gaining popularity. The people of Plzeň preferred imported cheaper bottom-fermented beers to local top fermented ales. The burghers of Plzeň invested in a new, state-of-the art brewery, the Měšťanský pivovar (Burghers' Brewery), and hired Josef Groll, a Bavarian brewer, to brew a bottom-fermented beer. On 5 October 1842, Groll had a new mash ready and on 11 November 1842, the new beer was first served at the feast of St. Martin markets.

The brewery registered Pilsner Bier B. B. name in 1859. In 1898, they also registered names Original Pilsner Bier 1842, Plzeňský pramen, Prapramen, Měšťanské Plzeňské, Plzeňský pravý zdroj and finally Pilsner Urquell and Plzeňský Prazdroj, which are in use today.

Pilsner Urquell is today brewed solely in the Plzeň brewery. It was brewed between 2002 and 2011 in Tychy, Poland and between 2004 and 2017 in Kaluga, Russia.

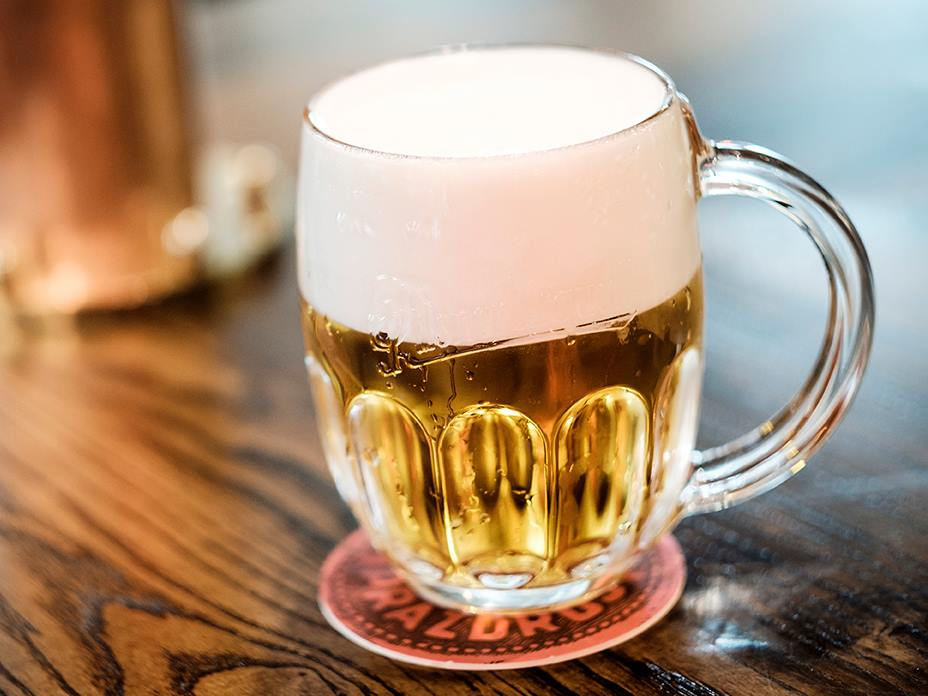
A mug of Pilsner Urquell

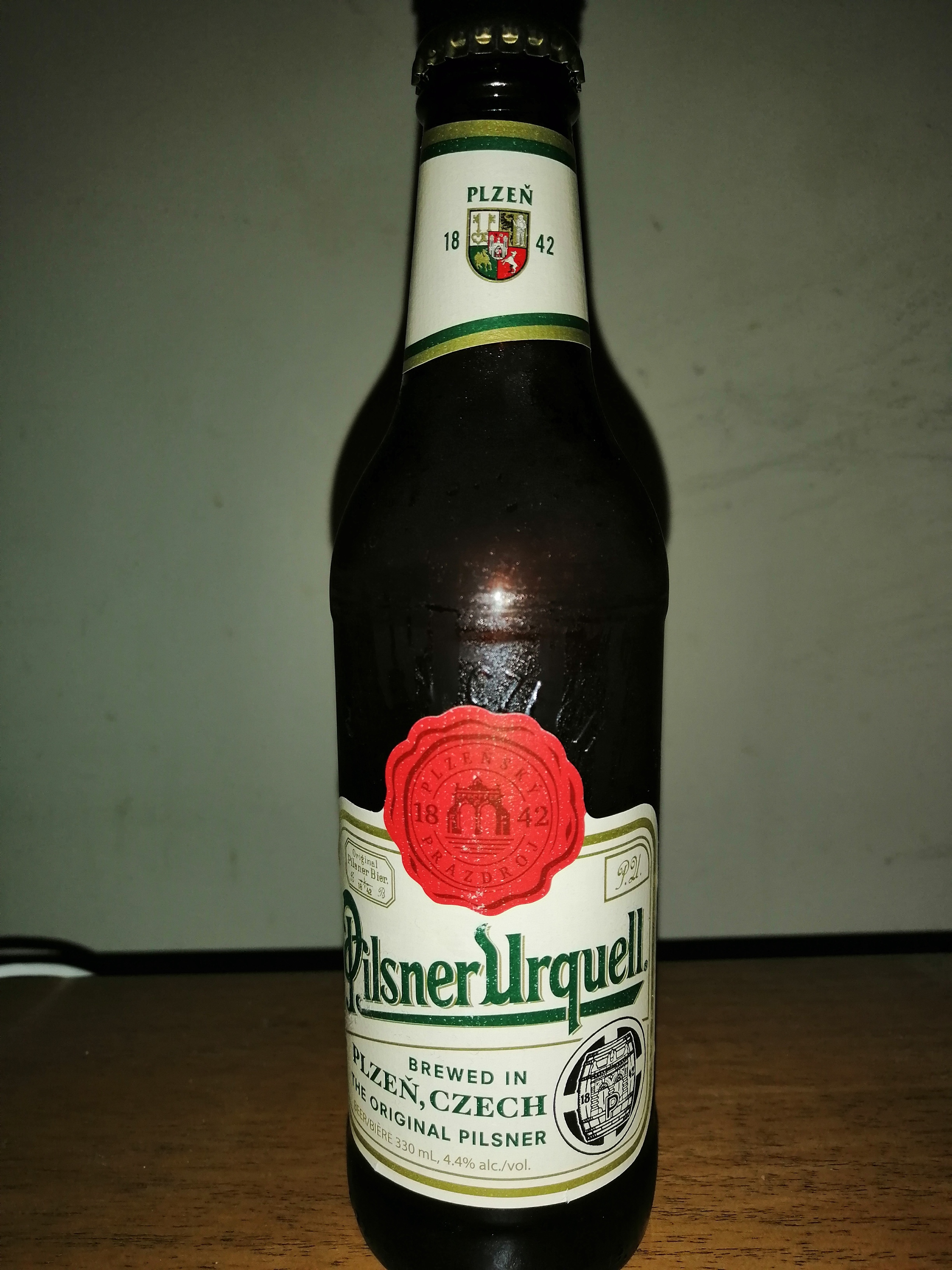
330 ml bottle of Pilsner Urquell

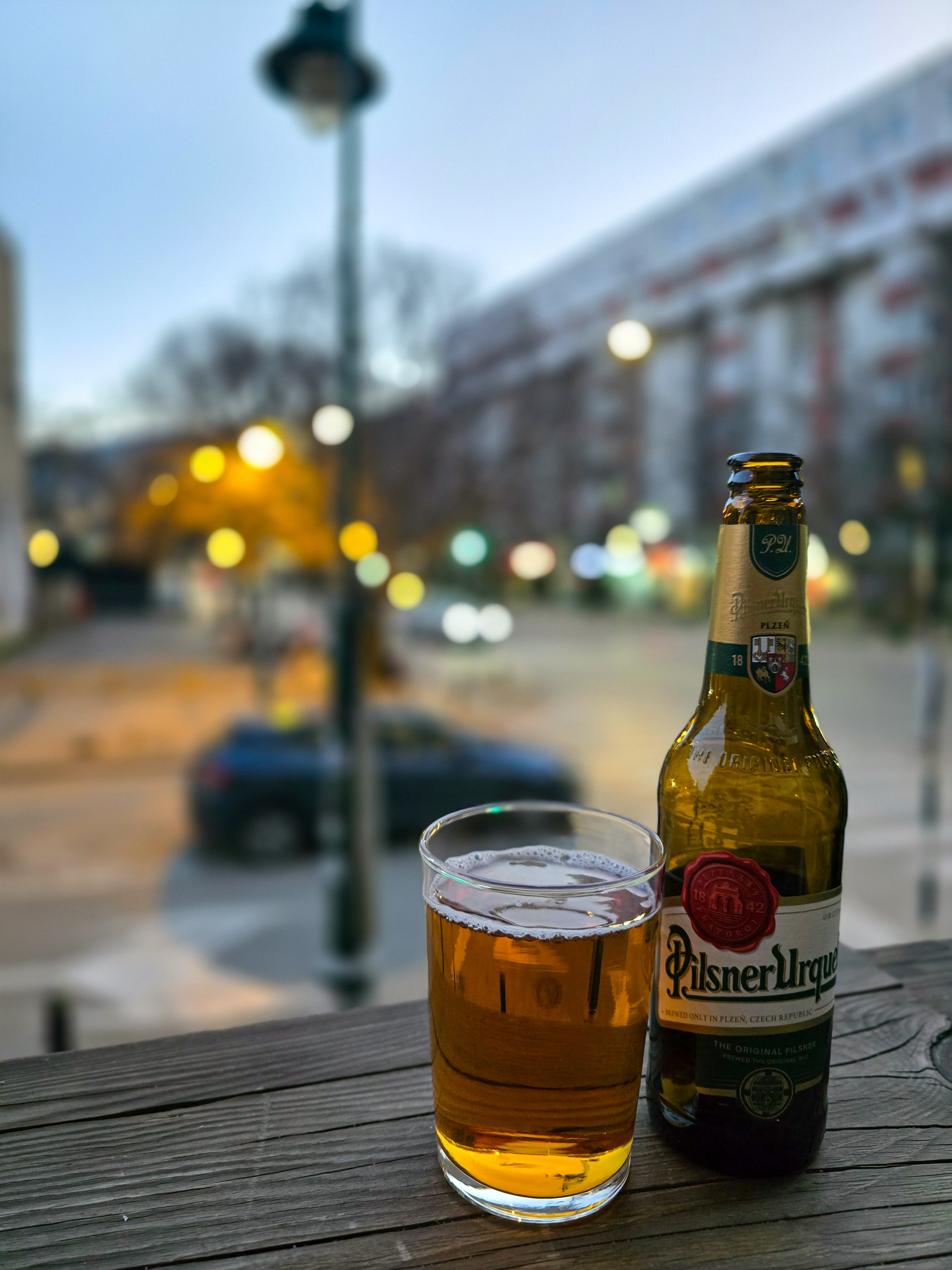
500 ml bottle of Pilsner Urquell and a glass in a pub

== See also ==
- Beer in the Czech Republic
- List of oldest companies
