= Bud Dry =

Brand of beer

- Manufacturer: Anheuser-Busch
- Introduced: 1990
- Discontinued: 2010
- Alcohol by volume: 5.0%
- Style: Pale lager

Bud Dry was a beer brewed by Anheuser-Busch in the United States and was a member of the Budweiser family of beers. It was introduced nationally in the U.S. in April 1990 with the slogan of "Why ask why? Try Bud Dry." It was originally successful in test markets and was expected to be a popular beer with the rise in Light Lager popularity. Bud Dry was brewed using Anheuser-Busch's DryBrew process, originally developed under the leadership of August A. Busch. The process also resulted in the creation of the similar, now-defunct, Michelob Dry.

Bud Dry was originally one of the three premier brands in the Budweiser family, commonly marketed alongside Budweiser and Bud Light. It had an appearance in the 1991 Bud Bowl III as the starting quarterback and "Top Draft Choice" for Bud Light.

With the introduction of Bud Ice in 1994, its marketing was curbed. Bud Dry was discontinued by Anheuser-Busch in December 2010.
