= Gambrinus (beer) =

Brand of beer brewed in the Czech Republic

- Gambrinus beer
- Type: Beer
- Manufacturer: Pilsner Urquell Brewery
- Distributor: Asahi Breweries
- Origin: Czech Republic
- Introduced: 1869
- Website: gambrinus.cz

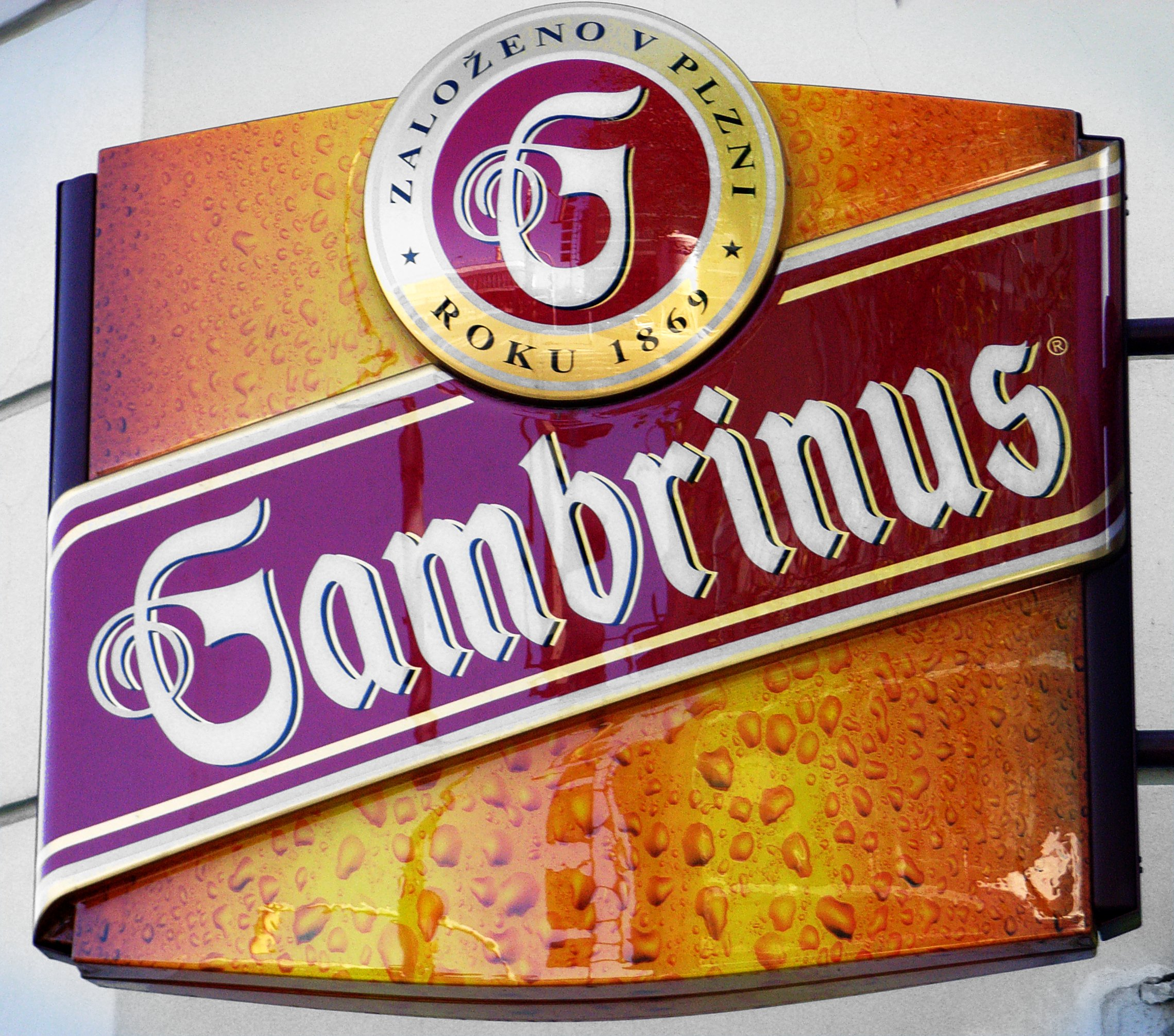
pub Gambrinus sign

Gambrinus (pronounced [ˈgambrɪnus]) is a beer brewed in the Czech Republic at the Pilsner Urquell Brewery. It is one of the most popular beers in the Czech Republic. The beer is named after Gambrinus, a legendary European king known for his mythical brewing abilities. The company was founded in 1869.

== Beers ==
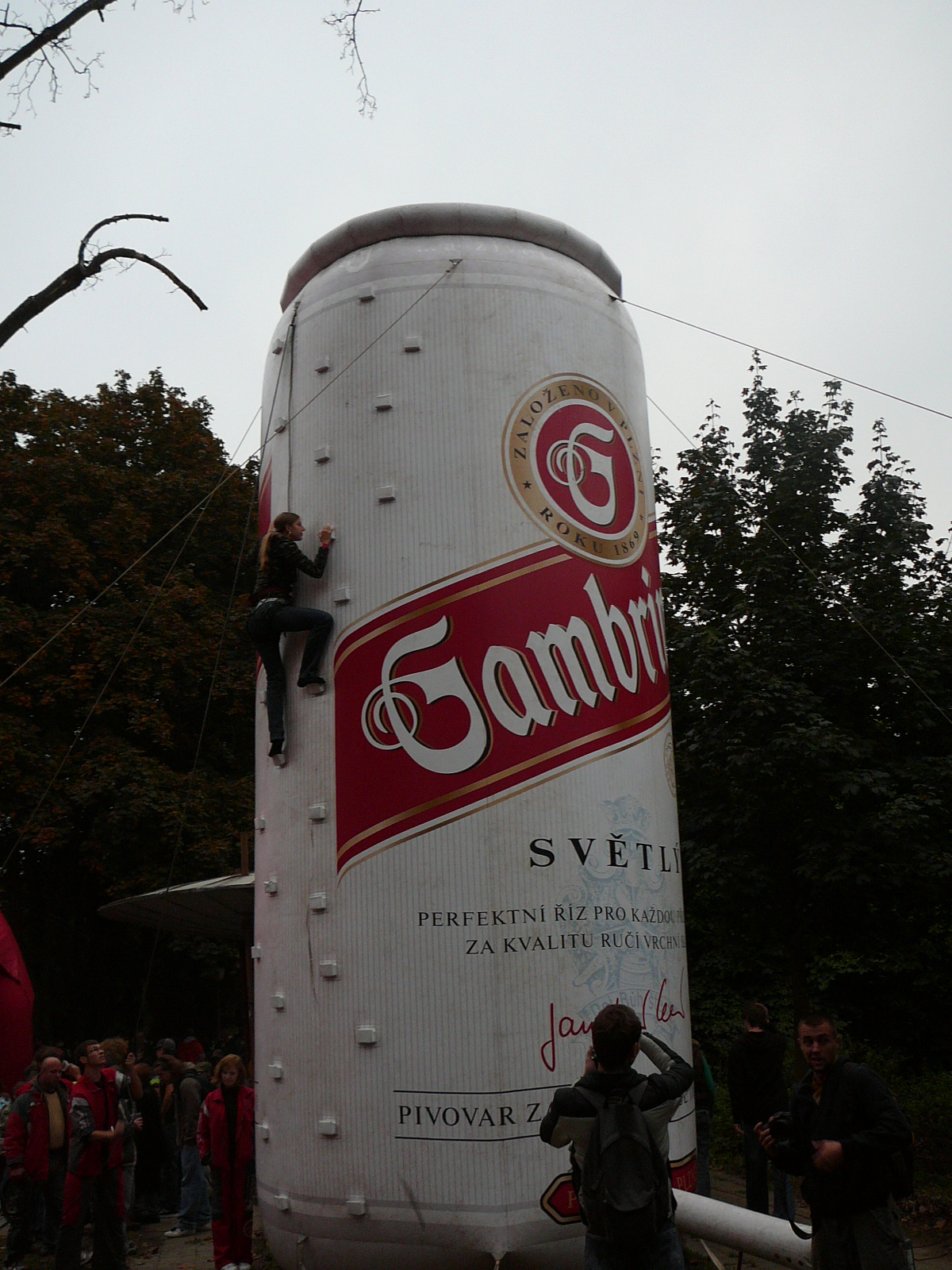
"Climbing can" in Brno

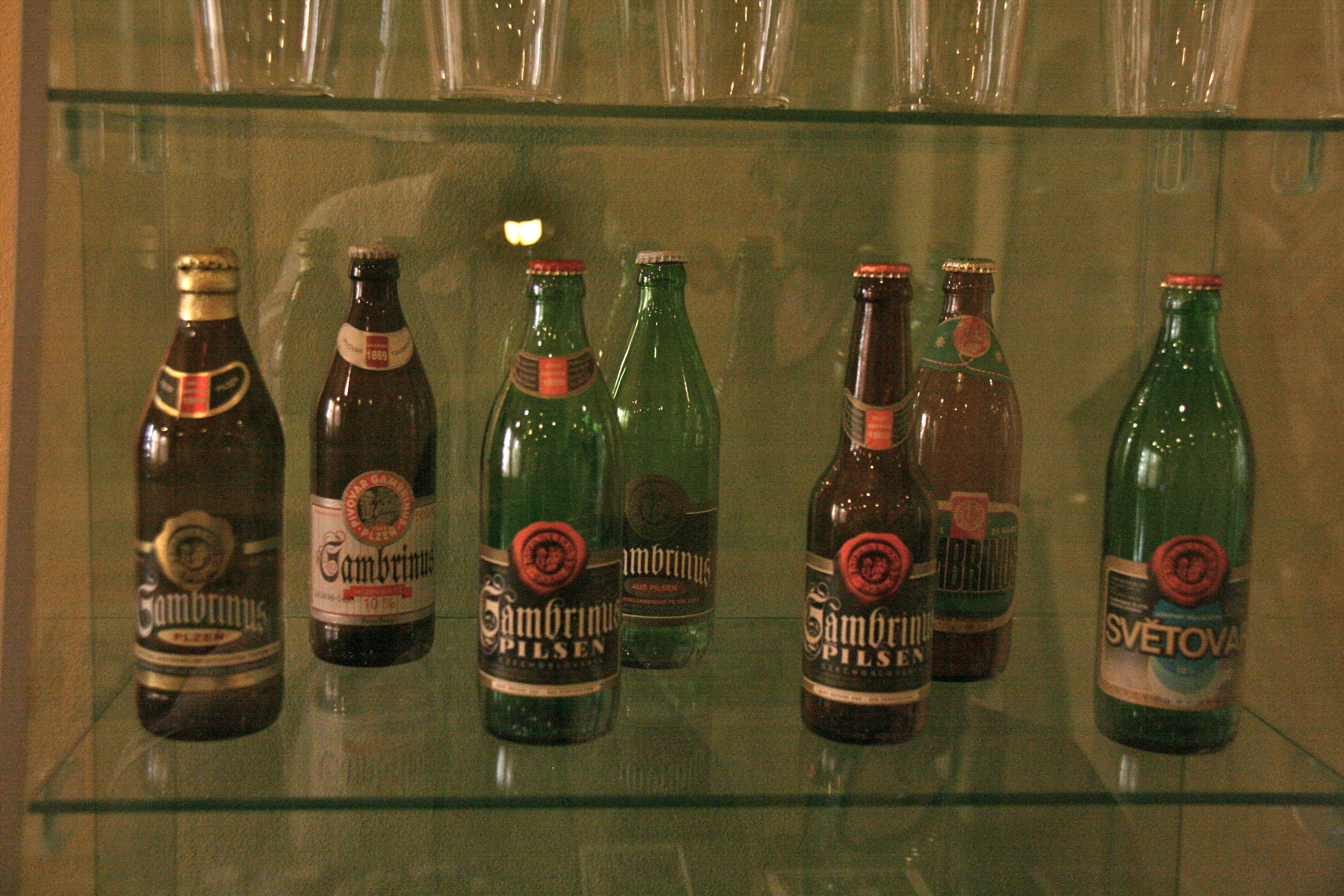
Historical Gambrinus labels

Gambrinus brews these different types of beer, which are supplied by Plzeňský Prazdroj:

- Gambrinus Original 10 – the most popular Gambrinus beer in the Czech Republic, 4,3% ABV.
- Gambrinus Plná 12 – a 12° pale lager, 5% ABV.
- Gambrinus Unpasteurized 10/12 – an unpasteurized pale lager, 4.2/5.2% ABV.
- Gambrinus Unfiltered Lager – an unfiltered, unpasteurized yeast pale lager, 4.8% ABV.
- Gambrinus Polotmavá 12 – an amber 12° lager, 5.2% ABV.
- Gambrinus Dry – a special brew with lowered amounts of sugar, 4.0% ABV.
- Gambrinus Flavoured – a canned pale beer, flavored with Lime/Elderberry/Lemon/Grapefruit.

== Other beers marketed under the Gambrinus name ==
This brand is used by many other breweries in Germany and Denmark and has been used in the United States. In Mendig (Rhineland-Palatinate) the Gambrinusfest beer festival is held every two years.

- Gambrinus Brewery in Weiden in der Oberpfalz, Germany
- Gambrinus Brewery in Oberhaid, Germany
- Gambrinus Brewery in Nagold, Germany
- Gambrinus Brewery in Naila, Germany
- Mohrenbrauerei August Huber Brewery has the black beer Gambrinus, Vorarlberg, Austria
- Hancock Brewery has the beer Old Gambrinus, Skive, Denmark
- Brauerei Ottakringer has the beer Gambrinus, Vienna, Austria
- Grivita Brewery has the beer Gambrinus, Bucharest, Romania
- August Wagner Breweries in Columbus, Ohio, United States (Defunct; Production rights acquired by the Pittsburgh Brewing Company; Company founder August Wagner was a native of Bavaria)

== See also ==
- Beer in the Czech Republic
- Gambrinus, patron saint of beer.
