= Frisco (drink) =

Flavored cider from the Czech Republic

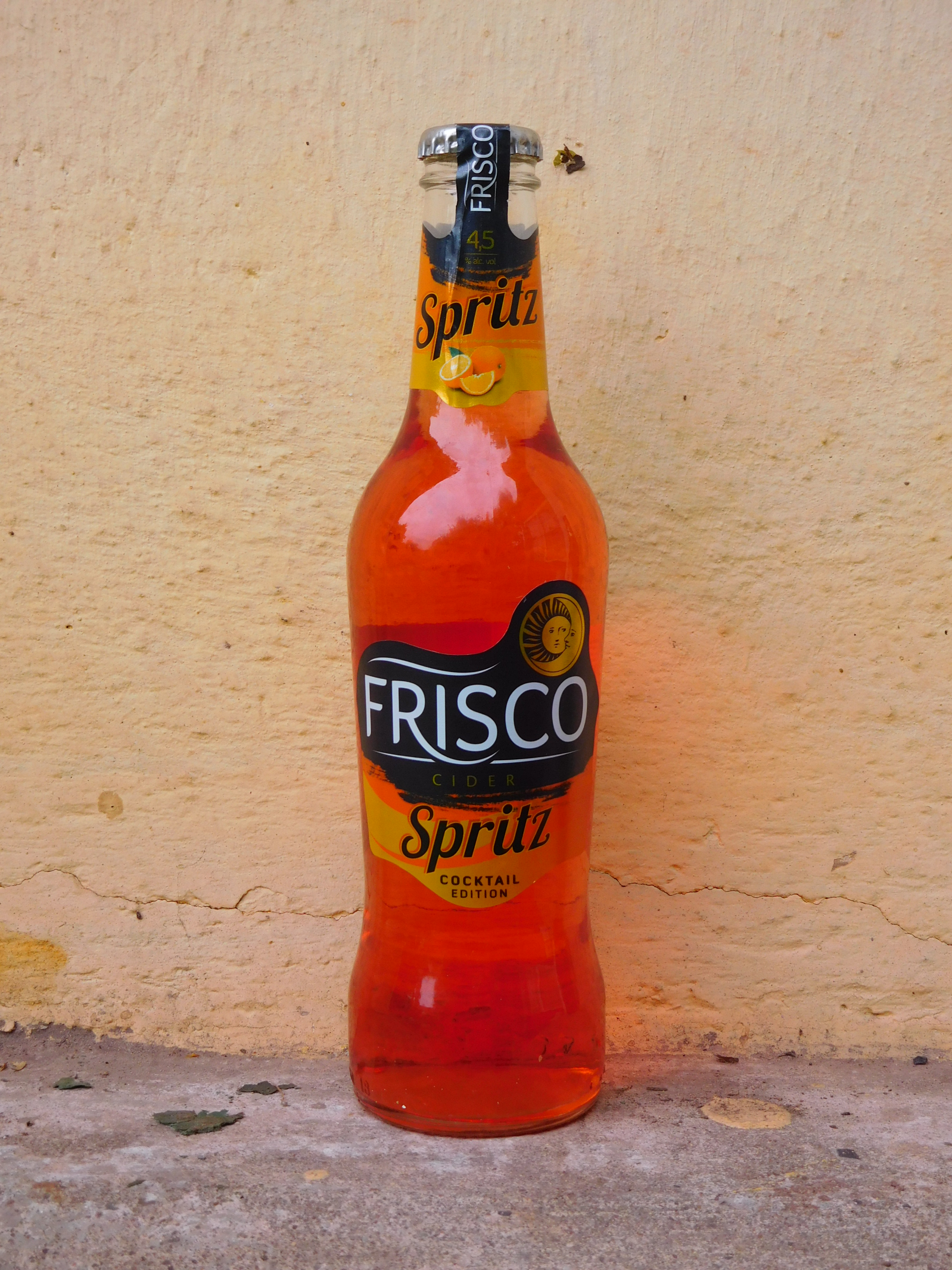
- Type: Cider
- Manufacturer: Pilsner Urquell Brewery
- Country of origin: Czech Republic
- Introduced: 2004; 21 years ago

Frisco is a flavored cider by the Pilsner Urquell Brewery that is available in Czech Republic, Slovakia and Lithuania. It was first introduced in 2004. The drink was manufactured by Lech Browary Wielkopolski in Poznan at first, but since 2013 it is made by Pilsner Urquell Brewery Original recipe included barley malt, but since 2017 the drink is a proper cider made from apples.

A non-alcoholic drink with the same name was produced in Finland from the 1970s until the early 2000s by Sinebrychoff and The Coca-Cola Company.

Frisco is also the name of an instant coffee-chicory blend in South Africa.

== Flavors ==
- Apple & Lemon
- Cranberry
- Forest Fruit
- Pineapple & Lemongrass
- Spritz (bitter orange and herbs)
- Mojito
- Bellini
- Strawberry Daiquiri
- Fiztonic
- Mango & Lime
