= Bud Bowl =

Super Bowl advertising campaign

Bud Bowl Logo

The Bud Bowl was a stop motion animated Super Bowl advertising campaign first aired in 1989, and sporadically during the 1990s. It served as an advertisement for Anheuser-Busch's Budweiser family of beers. It featured anthropomorphized Budweiser bottles playing a football game against Bud Light bottles.

== History ==
Bud Bowl I was aired in 1989 during the telecast of Super Bowl XXIII. It was originally created in the D'arcy Masius Benton & Bowles Account Service Dept by Tom Gooch and Rich Lalley who were looking for a way to strategically be involved with the Super Bowl. David Henke and Bill Oakley of D'arcy Masius Benton & Bowles were the creative team behind the original Bud Bowl. The 3D computer graphics promotional spots preceding the game commercials were made by San Francisco Production Group. The stop-motion filming process was painstaking, involving eight hours of work to produce just three seconds of footage. Bud Bowl II was shot with stop motion animation by Broadcast Arts in NYC. Bud Ice and Bud Dry would make appearances in later Bud Bowls. Beer bottles with the voices of Terry Bradshaw and Tom Landry (the latter of which was topped with Landry's distinctive fedora) also made appearances. It has been jokingly said that the Bud Bowl was actually more exciting than the Super Bowl itself in some years. Starting with the fourth edition, a consumer contest was tied to the commercials, with game pieces distributed in the product packaging. Gambling on the outcome of the Bud Bowl was also common, despite the fact that some people knew the results before the actual airing.

In later years, Bud Bowl was retained as an advertising promotion, but in different forms. Beginning with the fifth edition, the bottles were transitioned to CGI by Pacific Data Images (later PDI/DreamWorks). In the sixth edition, the CGI bottles however were done by Boss Film Studios. In 1996, it served as a contest only. Game pieces with football plays written on it were distributed, and viewers with the winning play on their piece won. By 1998, it was mostly removed from television. Bud Bowl was used often in static store display promotions, and/or contests. By 2002, it was attached to a series of local events, such as concerts, festivals, and "block parties," taking place at the host city of the Super Bowl in the days leading up to the game.

== Results ==
Bud Bowl	Super Bowl	Year	Score	Announcer(s)	Coaches	Notes
Bud Bowl I	XXIII	1989	Budweiser 27, Bud Light 24	Bob Costas & Paul Maguire		An alternate ending of the first Bud Bowl was a cutaway to the movie Heidi. This was a reference to the Heidi Game. Another alternate ending was an incident where 2 players were picked up by a man from the fridge, abruptly ending the game at 24-24.
Bud Bowl II	XXIV	1990	Budweiser 36, Bud Light 34	Brent Musburger & Terry Bradshaw	The Bud Light coach was an impersonation of Bear Bryant.	At the end of the "game", the slogan "Nothing Beats a Bud" was unveiled.
Bud Bowl III	XXV	1991	Bud Light 23, Budweiser 21	Keith Jackson & Don Meredith with Chris Berman		Bud Bowl III was actually between Budweiser vs Bud Light with Bud Dry as their star QB for Bud Light. The end of the game was a parody of The Play from the 1982 Big Game.
Bud Bowl IV	XXVI	1992	Budweiser 27, Bud Light 24	Chris Berman		Unlike previous Bud Bowls, this one featured a man looking for his ticket, which his wife had tossed in the trash.
Bud Bowl V	XXVII	1993	Budweiser 35, Bud Light 31	Ahmad Rashad & Karen Duffy	Joe Namath was the coach of the Budweiser team, and Corbin Bernsen was the coach of the Bud Light team.	
Bud Bowl VI	XXVIII	1994	Bud Light 20, Budweiser 14	Marv Albert	Mike Ditka was the coach of Budweiser team, and Bum Phillips was coach of the Bud Light team.	Bud Bowl VI featured the first appearance by a can of beer in the game. The can scored a touchdown, but was ejected from the Bud Bowl shortly thereafter for excessive celebration and foul language.
Bud Bowl VII	XXIX	1995	Budweiser 26, Bud Light 24	Chris Berman		
Bud Bowl 8	XXXI	1997	Budweiser 27, Bud Light 24	Howie Long & Ronnie Lott		

== In popular culture ==
- In The Simpsons episode "Lisa the Greek", the "Duff Bowl" is shown. In the episode "The Father, the Son, and the Holy Guest Star", Homer complains that, after learning a new fact about Plutarch, he can no longer remember who won Bud Bowl 8.
- During halftime of Super Bowls XXVIII through XXX (1994–1996), Beavis and Butt-head specials known as Butt Bowl I, Butt Bowl II, and Butt Bowl III were aired.
- The song "Nerd Alert!" by American band The Aquabats references the games with the lyric "Get stupid on your time / Get the Bud Bowl off the air".
- Reason.tv parodied the FDA's ban on Four Loko and caffeinated alcoholic drinks with Buzz Bowl I: Four Loko vs Joose.
- During Episode 29 of Sklarbro Country, The Sklar Brothers discuss Jon Bon Jovi expressing interest in becoming part owner of the Atlanta Falcons. Claiming, "It's a sports disaster on par with the Bud Bowl VI, the worst of the Bud Bowls. They came back strong the next year, but that was a down year for them."
- An early 90s episode of Late Night with David Letterman featured a parody of the Bud Bowl animation by instead portraying it merely with rows of actual beer bottles lined up in front of each other, then being smashed across the playing field floor with a large shop broom.
- In Noah Baumbach’s 1995 debut film Kicking and Screaming, a character named Otis asks his roommate, “Who won Bud Bowl II?”
- In an episode of MADtv, a claymated parody of the advertisements known as Vud Bowl V is shown, with every "Vud" and "Vud Light" bottle on the field ending up smashed all over the ground just after kickoff.
