= Josef Groll =

German inventor of pilsner beer (1813–1887)

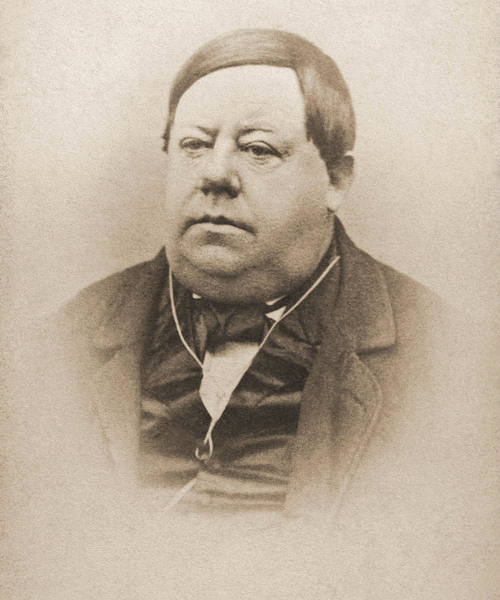
Groll

Josef Groll (German: Joseph Groll; 21 August 1813 – 22 November 1887) was a German brewer, best known for being the first brewer of Pilsner beer. He is sometimes called "the Father of the Pilsner". The world's first-ever pale lager, Pilsner Urquell was highly successful, and served as the inspiration for more than two-thirds of the beer produced in the world today.

== Brewing the first pilsner ==
In the late 1830s, the people of Plzeň (German: Pilsen), Kingdom of Bohemia started to prefer less expensive imported bottom-fermented beers to local top-fermented beers. As a result, many of top-fermented beers from Plzeň were not being sold fast enough, got spoiled and the casks had to be poured out. In 1839 the burghers with brewing rights decided to build a new brewery capable of producing a bottom-fermented beer with a longer storage life. At the time, this was termed a Bavarian beer, since bottom-fermentation were popular mostly in Bavaria. For bottom-fermentation it is necessary to keep the fermentation tanks cool between 4 and 9 degrees Celsius. The climate in Bohemia is similar to that in Bavaria making it possible to store winter ice and sustain bottom-fermentation year-round.

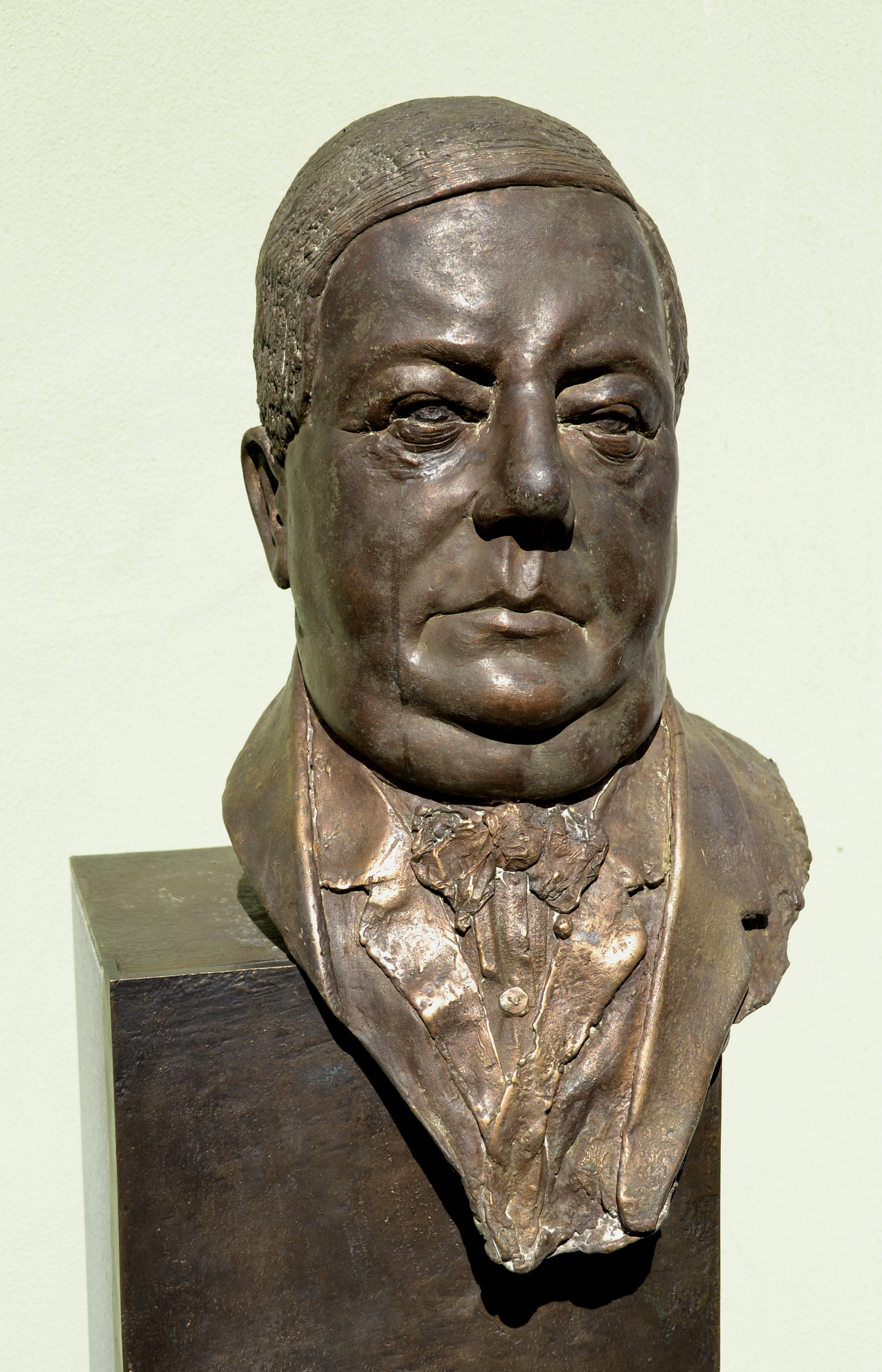
Josef Groll bust in Vilshofen an der Donau

The burghers of Plzeň not only built a new brewery, but also hired Josef Groll, a Bavarian brewer with lager-brewing experience. Josef Groll's father owned a brewery in Vilshofen an der Donau in Lower Bavaria and had long experimented with new recipes for bottom-fermented beer. On 5 October 1842, Groll brewed the first batch of Urquell beer. The use of soft Plzeň water, barley malt prepared in an indirectly heated English-style kiln and Saaz hops, resulted in golden color and herbal, floral taste. The new beer was first served on 11 November 1842 and was very well received by the local populace. The demand for the Pilsner beer grew strongly. Soon the brewery expanded and started to export to many countries.

Josef Groll's contract with the brewery ended on 30 April 1845. Groll returned to Vilshofen an der Donau and later inherited his father's brewery.

== Death ==
Josef Groll died on 22 November 1887, aged 74, of a heart attack in the house of his daughter Kathi Hutter in Vilshofen an der Donau.

== Brewery ==
The Groll brewery no longer exists. Parts of the brewery, however, were acquired by Wolferstetter, another brewery located in Vilshofen an der Donau. Wolferstetter still produces a Josef Groll Pils.
