= Attenuation (brewing) =

Amount of sugar converted to alcohol

In brewing, attenuation refers to the conversion of sugars into alcohol and carbon dioxide by the fermentation process; the greater the attenuation, the more sugar has been converted into alcohol. A more attenuated beer is drier and more alcoholic than a less attenuated beer made from the same wort.

Attenuation can be quantified by comparing the specific gravity — the density of a solution, relative to pure water — of the extract before and after fermentation, quantities termed the original and final gravities. Specific gravity can be measured by buoyancy, with a hydrometer. The higher the specific gravity of a solution, the higher the hydrometer floats.

Apparent attenuation is calculated using the equation:
$$AA=\frac{OG-FG}{OG-1}$$
where AA is apparent attenuation and OG and FG are the original and final gravities. For example, if a beer's OG is 1.05 and its FG is 1.01, then the apparent attenuation is:
$$\frac{1.05-1.01}{1.05-1}=0.80$$

Because fermentation produces ethanol, which has a lower density than water (gravity of 0.787 at 25°C), the apparent attenuation overestimates the actual percentage of sugars consumed. Brewers generally refer to this apparent attenuation when using the word without qualification, although the measurement of real attenuation — the actual percentage of sugar consumed by the yeast — is an important indicator of yeast health and for producing certain styles of beer. A beer which does not attenuate to the expected level in fermentation will have more residual sugar and thus be sweeter and heavier-bodied.
