= Beer in Italy =

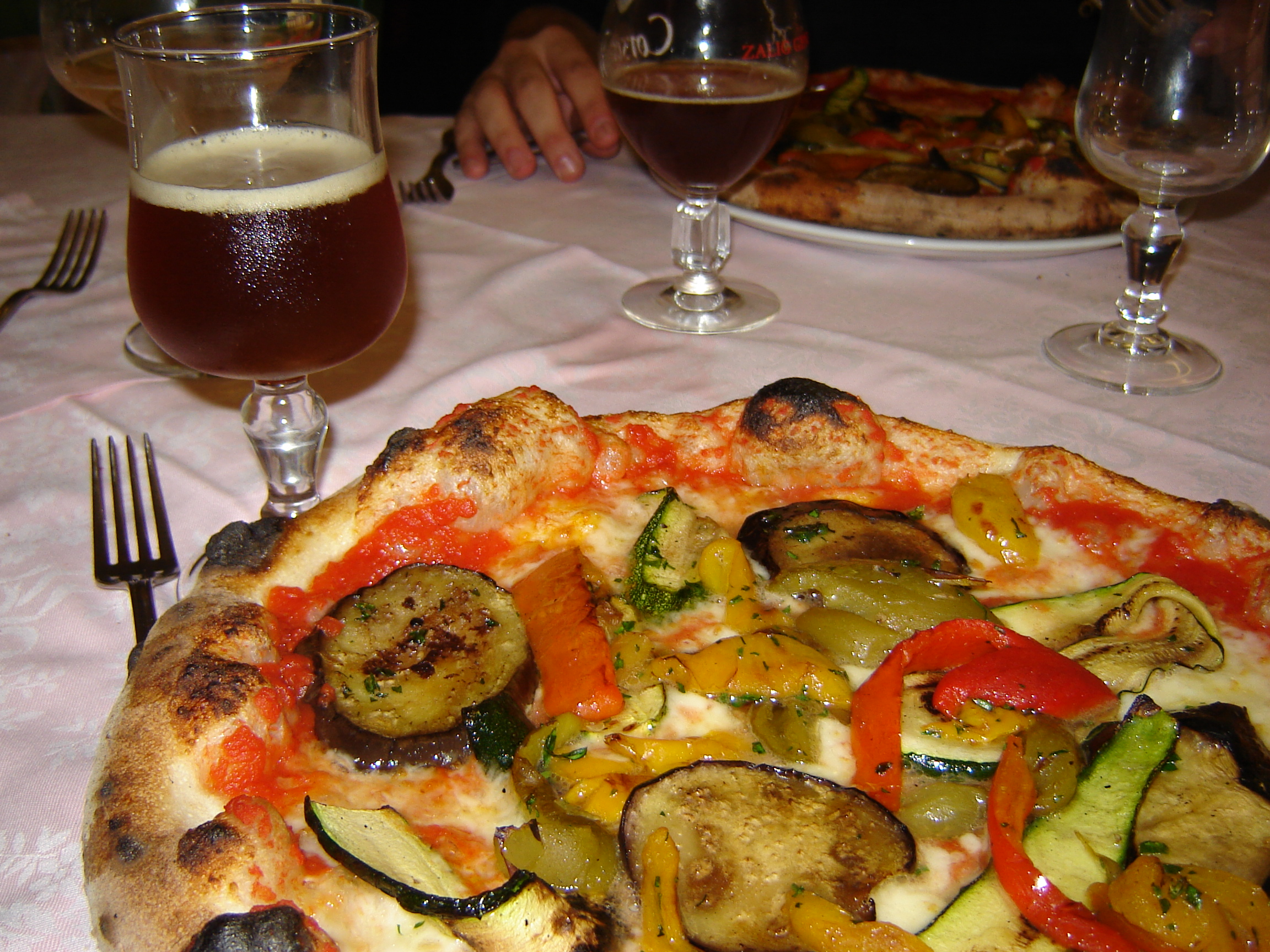
In Italy, beer is considered an ideal accompaniment to pizza.

Italy is considered to be part of the wine belt of Europe. Nevertheless, beer, particularly mass-produced pale lagers, are common in the country. It is traditionally considered to be an ideal accompaniment to pizza; since the 1970s, beer has spread from pizzerias and has become much more popular for drinking in other situations.

In the seventh century BC in Sicily, the Phoenicians traded and consumed beer. In Piedmont, Pombia, Province of Novara, an archaeological investigation found tombs from the Golasecca culture, including a tomb from 560 BC containing traces of beer. Ancient Rome knew of beer and produced small amounts, but the systems of production were destroyed in various barbarian invasions. The first medical school, the Schola Medica Salernitana, praised the substance stating that it "supports old age, flows through the veins, increases well-being, and strengthens the blood".

On the occasion of his wedding, Ludovico Sforza distributed beer freely to the Milanese. At this time, it was referred to in Florence as "barley wine". The first brewery in Italy, according to Hermes Zampollo, was "Spluga" in Chiavenna, which opened in 1840. However, the company Wührer stated that its brewing commenced in Brescia in 1829. The first person in Italy to cultivate hops for beer brewing was Gaetano Pasqui in 1847. In 1983, the country consumed 12 million hectolitres (260 million imperial gallons; 320 million US gallons) of beer. As of 2010, Italy has a beer consumption of 30 litres (6.6 imp gal; 7.9 US gal) per capita per year.

== Breweries and brands ==
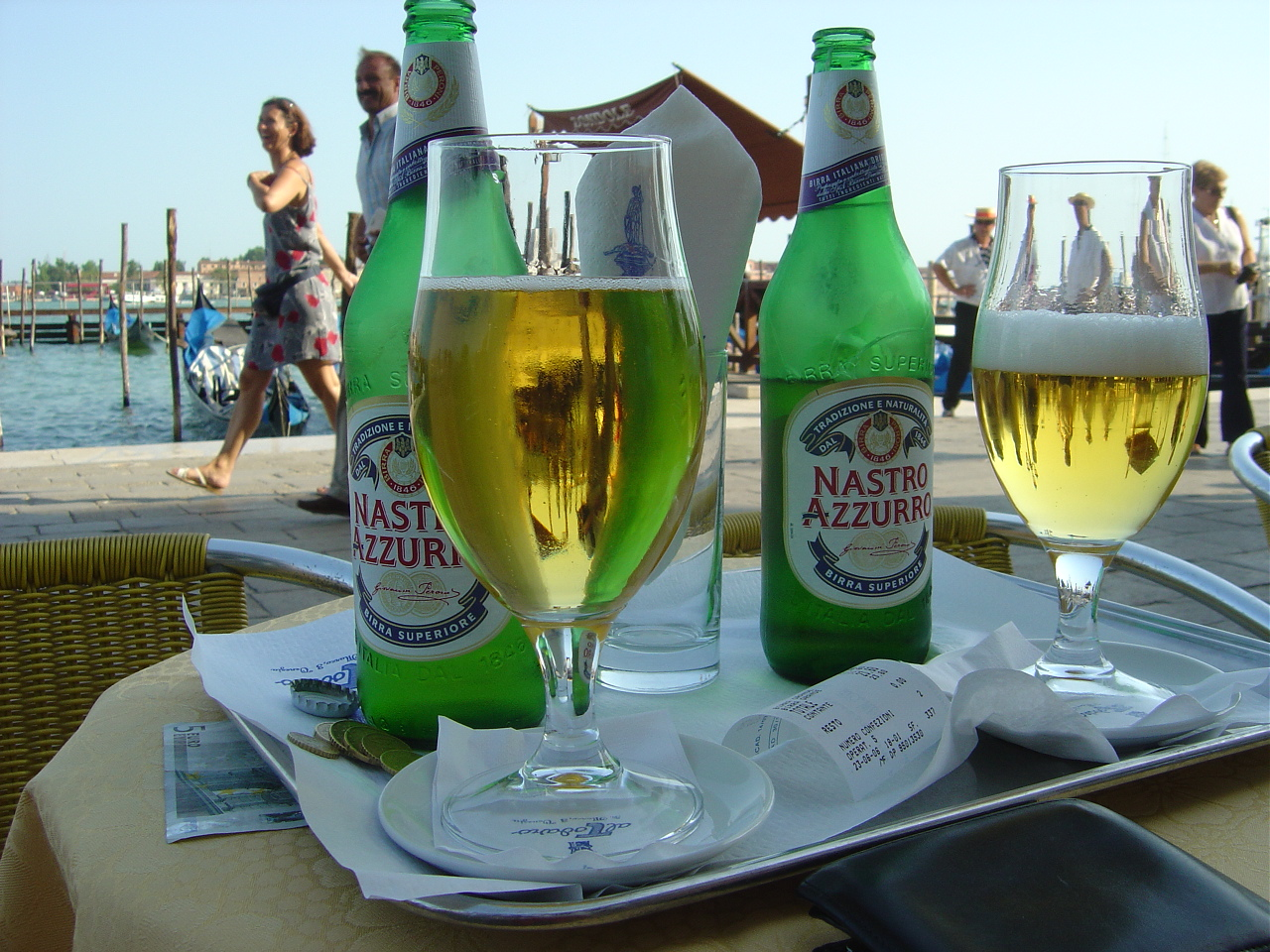
Peroni's Nastro Azzurro at a Venice café

One of the oldest and most widespread breweries in Italy is Peroni, today owned by the Asahi group, which also owns the popular brand Nastro Azzurro. Other known breweries and beer brands are:

- Beba
- Birra del Borgo (owned by InBev)
- Birra Raffo (owned by Asahi)
- Birrificio Baladin
- Birrificio Italiano
- Castello
- Dreher (owned by Heineken)
- Forst
- Ichnusa (owned by Heineken)
- Menabrea (owned by Forst)
- Birrificio Dr. Barbanera
- Birra Messina (owned by Heineken)
- Birrificio Lambrate
- Birra Morena
- Moretti (owned by Heineken)
- Opperbacco
- Birra Pedavena (owned by Castello)
- Peroni (owned by Asahi)
- Poretti (owned by Carlsberg)
- Birra Semedorato
- Toccalmatto
- Theresianer

== See also ==
- Beer and breweries by region

== Bibliography ==
- Jackson, Michael (1998). Le birre: oltre 600 marche e produttori di tutto il mondo. Milan: Vallardi. ISBN 88-8211-207-1.
