= Beer in Romania =

Several brands of beer are produced and served in Romania, including beer from local breweries and craft beers. The history of this beverage includes the territory of the Romanian lands, since at least the times of the Romanian Old Kingdom (specifically during the late modern period) to contemporary times.

== Overview ==
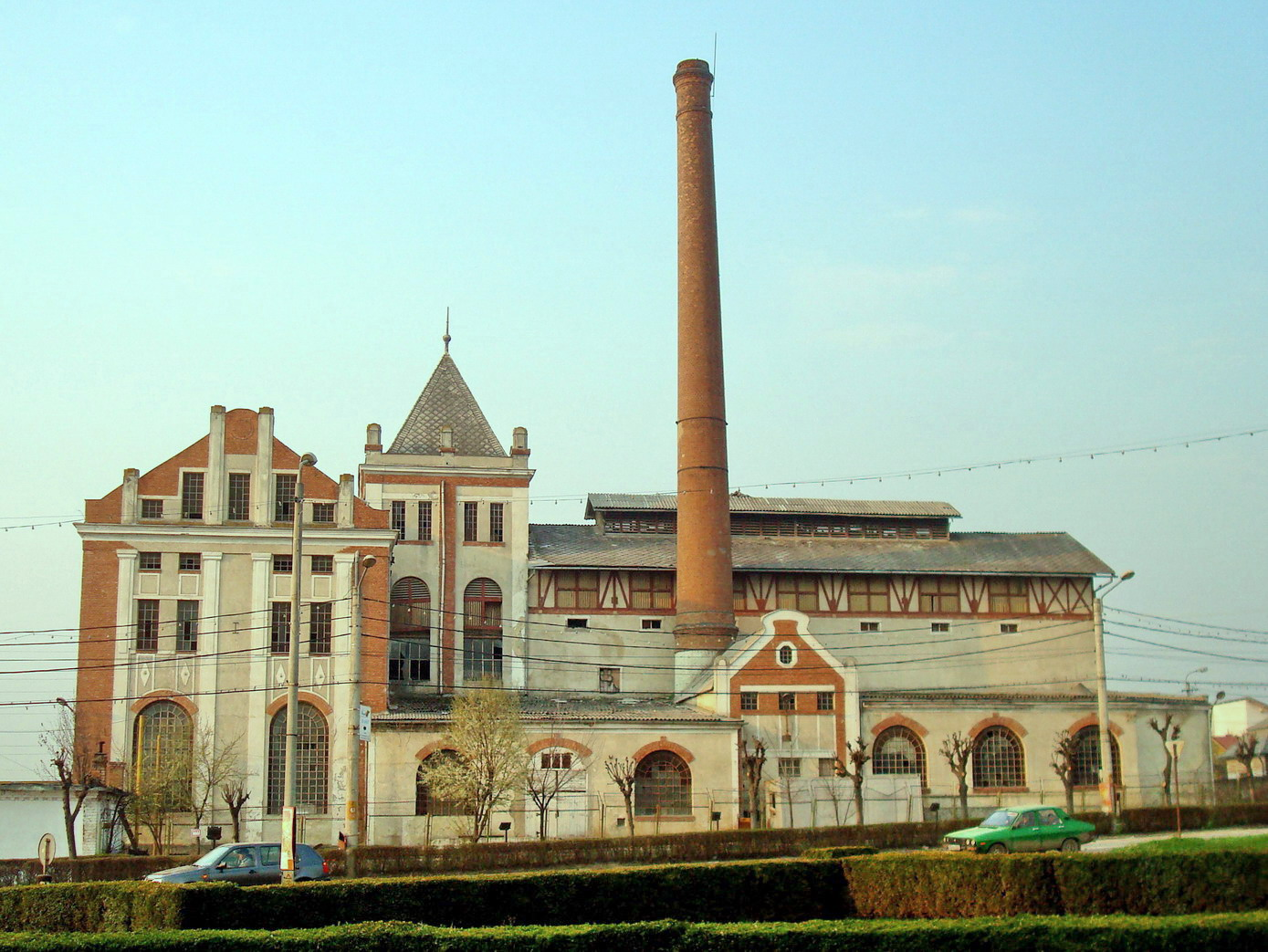
Turda old beer factory situated in Turda, Cluj County, Transylvania.

A national association of beer with mititei came into existence during the 1877 Independence War of Romania and after that it saw a spread of beer pubs throughout the Romanian Kingdom. The beer pubs (berării) became a place of social and business meetings for the Romanian urban middle-class. Currently, Romanians are amongst the heaviest beer drinkers in the world, with an annual consumption of over 100 litres (22 imperial gallons; 26 US gallons) per capita in 2007.

Romanian law considers beer and wine to be foodstuffs and therefore they are not subject to the usual tariffs and restrictions imposed upon alcoholic beverages. The word "beer" in Romanian (bere) is derived from German Bier (itself an early loan from Latin biber), but there is also an obsolete regional word "olovină", of Nordic origin (ole; Danish: øl) and related to ale.

== Brands ==
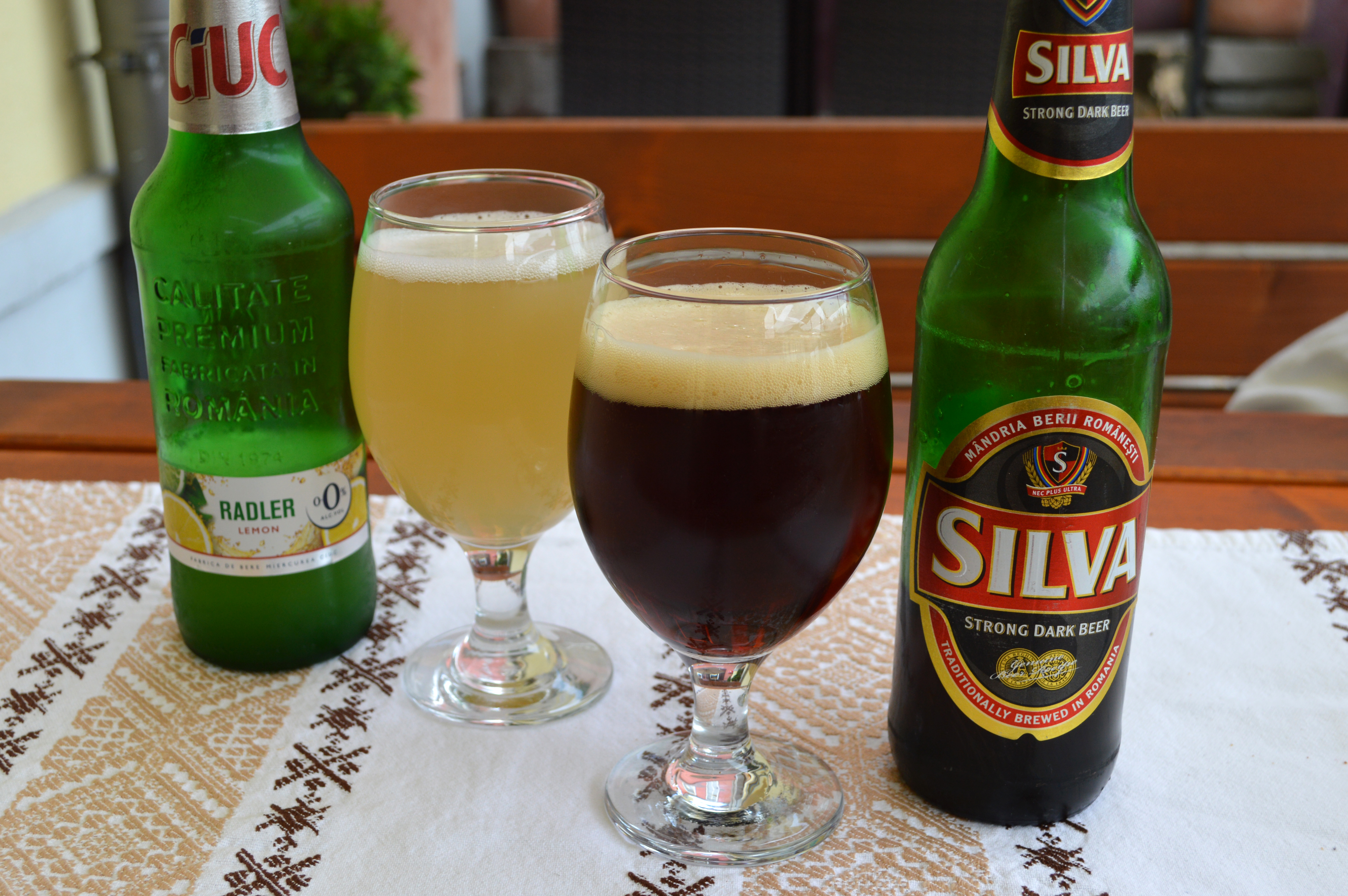
A Ciuc radler and a Silva dark beer.

Some of the most commercially consumed Romanian beers are: Ursus (Latin for "bear"), Timișoreana (named after the city of Timișoara), Stejar (Romanian for "oak") – all owned by Asahi, Bergenbier – owned by Molson Coors, Ciuc (named after Miercurea Ciuc) and Silva (Latin for "forest") – owned by Heineken. Silva and Ursus have also a dark lager variety.

Some international brands are brewed locally, being very popular but sometimes more expensive than the traditional ones: Heineken, Carlsberg, Stella Artois, Beck's, Tuborg, Holsten, Peroni, Staropramen, and Skol.

Also, there are a large number of beers usually sold in 2-liter PET bottles and targeting the low-end market. Examples are: Ciucaș, Golden Brau, Bürger, Neumarkt, Bucegi, Gambrinus, Azuga, Noroc, Albacher.

== Breweries ==
The largest brewing companies in Romania are Ursus Breweries, owned by Asahi Group Holdings, Ltd., which has three breweries, in Brașov, Buzău, and Timișoara, and Heineken Romania (previously called Brau Union Romania), which also has four breweries, in Constanța, Craiova, Miercurea Ciuc, and Târgu Mureș.

Other major companies are Bergenbier, owned by Molson Coors, which has facilities in Blaj and Ploiești, and Tuborg Romania (officially called United Romanian Breweries), part of the Carlsberg Group, which has a brewery in Pantelimon.

Other national companies are European Drinks, which owns a brewery in Sudrigiu, Romaqua Group, which owns a brewery near Alba Iulia., Albrau, located in Onești, which produces its own beer brands, as well as dedicated brands for supermarket or hypermarket chains. and Martens (the former Robbere brewery) Galaţi, owned by Bierbrouwerij Martens from Belgium since 1998, which also produces both dedicated beer brands and its own brands. Two other smaller companies which are operating mainly regional are Bermas, based in Suceava, and Imex, located in Satu Mare. The Imex brewery facility has been taken over by Sam Mills and since 2016 brews Samburger beer.

== Romanian craft beer ==
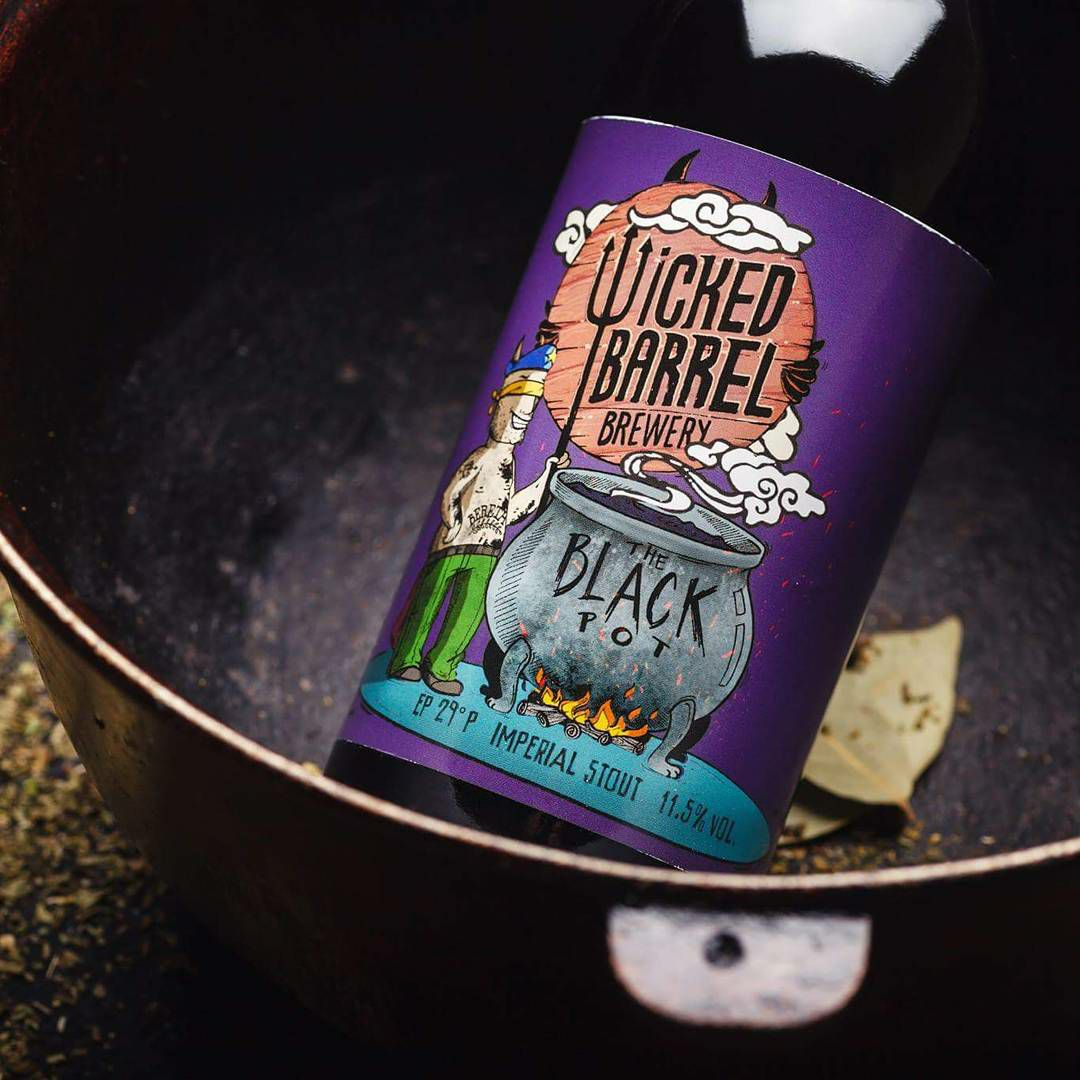
Wicked Barrel & Bereta, The Black Pot

In Timișoara there is the microbrewery Clinica de Bere with their main brand Terapia since 2011. In 2013 Alexandru Geamănu and Laurențiu Bănescu started the micro-brewery Fabrica de Bere Bună (Factory of Good Beer) with their main brand Zăganu in Măneciu-Ungureni. In 2014 a brewer in cooperation with the Sapientia University started the Csíki Sör Manufaktúrát in Sânsimion. In 2017 they were ordered to change their name because Heineken already has Ciuc beer registered as a brand, Igazi Csíki Sör means "Real Ciuc beer".

In 2013 Leonard Mihoc started his brewery Nemțeana in Roman. In April 2015 the brothers Alin and Răzvan Matache opened a microbrewery in Bucharest and began brewing different types of ales. Their main brand is Ground Zero Beer.

Founded in 2016 in Jilava, Hop Hooligans brewery quickly rose popularity with bold collaborations and an ever-changing range of new beers. They are also among the few independent brewers that drew some international interest. As of 2019 they have participated in numerous craft beer Festivals and tap take overs across Europe.

Carol Beer is a Romanian craft brewery that launched on November 30, 2017, introducing its first lineup of eight artisanal beer varieties. The brand quickly became part of the country’s emerging craft beer movement.

In February 2017, gypsy brewers Wicked Barrel began their activity. Their debut beer – an imperial stout brewed in collaboration with Bereta called The Black Pot – shot to the number one spot in Romania on RateBeer.com in its first week of sales.

In 2018 Wicked Barrel was declared 2nd Best New Brewery in the World at RateBeer Best Awards from a total of +6400 breweries.

The craft beer industry has seen exponential growth since 2015, currently at around 50 breweries with a yearly output of under 5000 hectoliters. To keep up with the growth, a series of online resources is now available, such as Universitatea de Bere posting regular beer reviews and podcasts, or Beerologique, the Romanian craft beer database, targeting an international audience and keeping track of each and every brewery in the country.

== Gallery ==
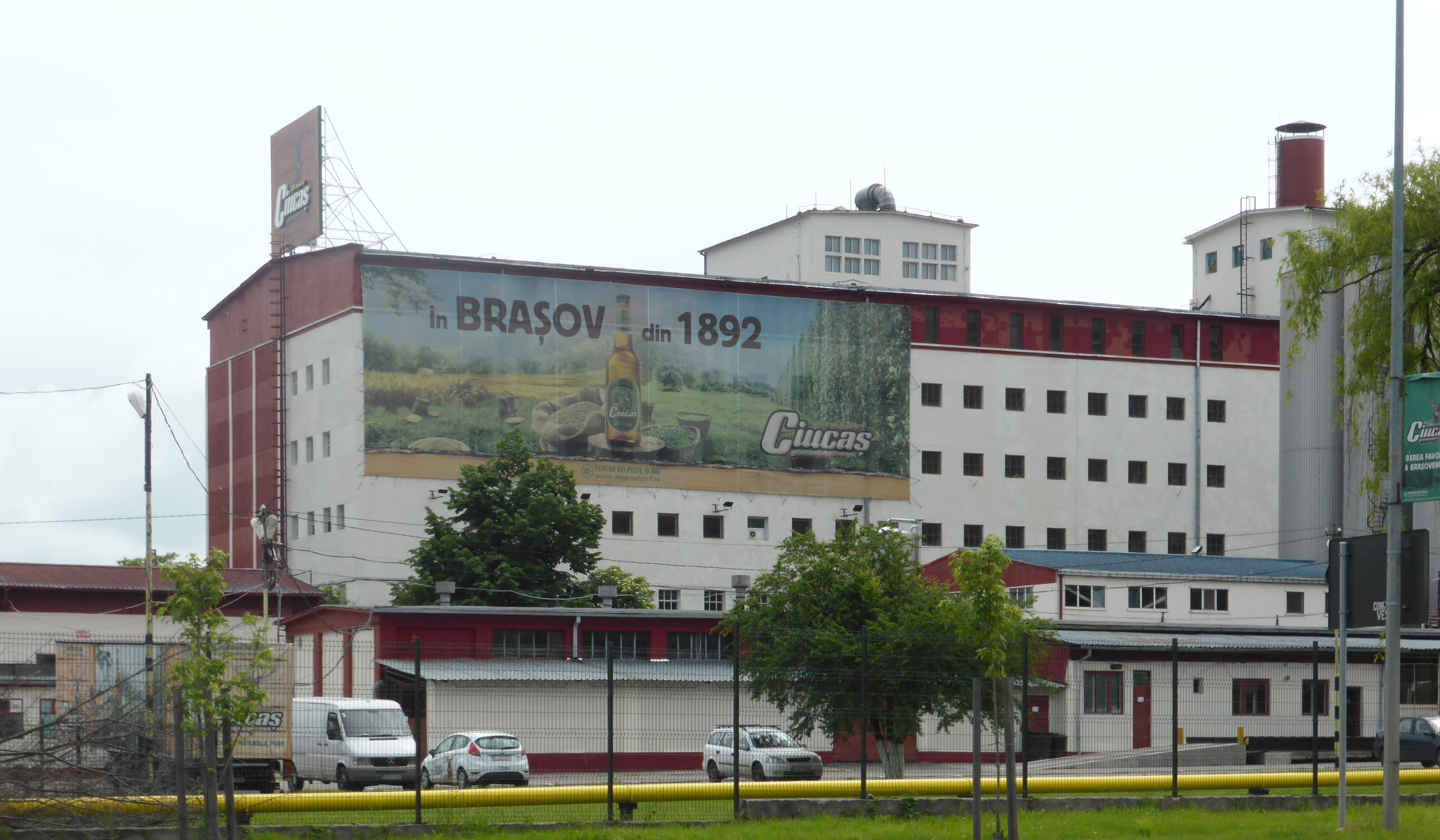
Ciucaș brewery in Brașov

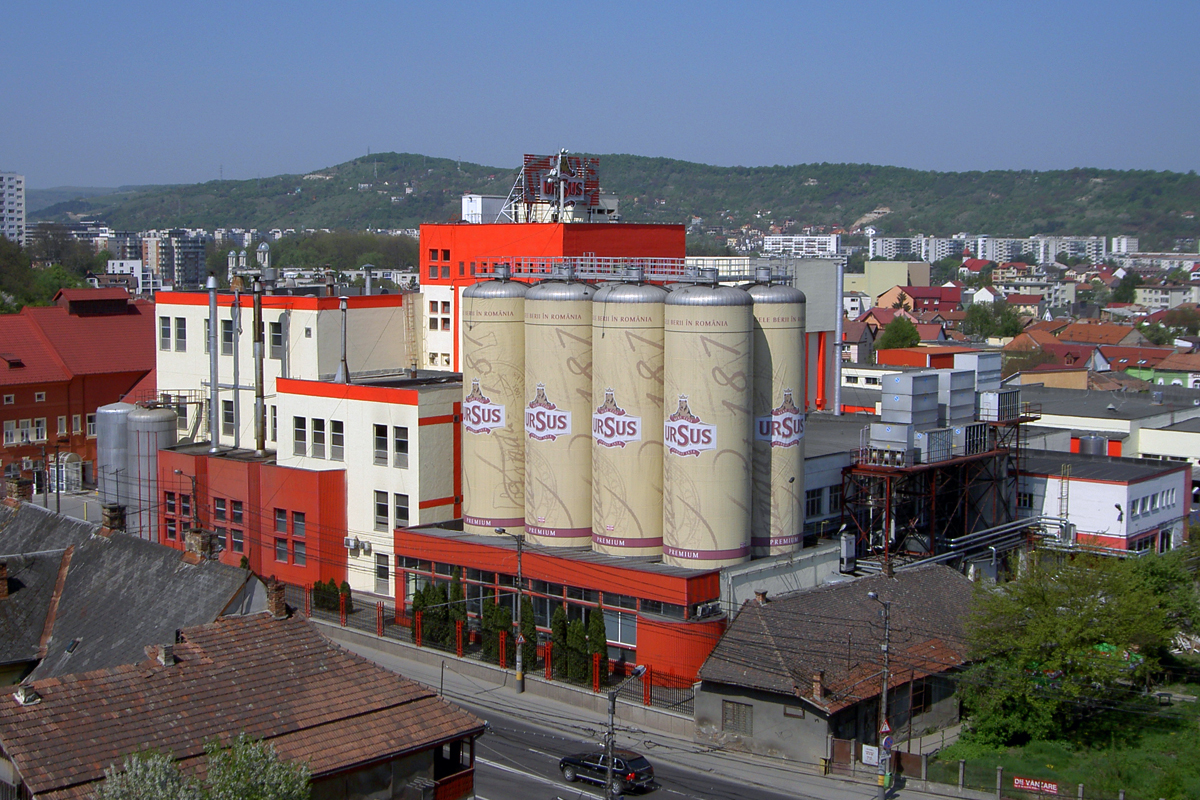
Ursus brewery in Cluj-Napoca

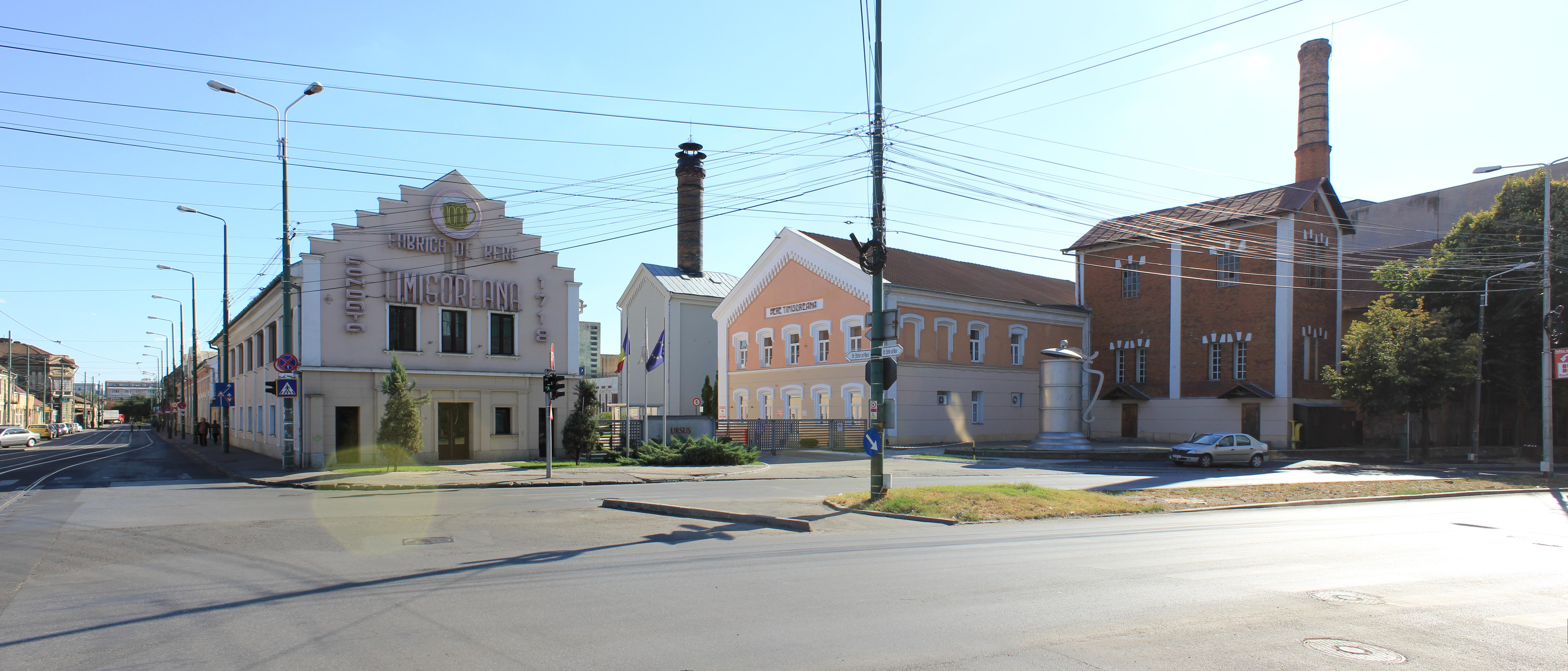
The old beer factory in Timișoara

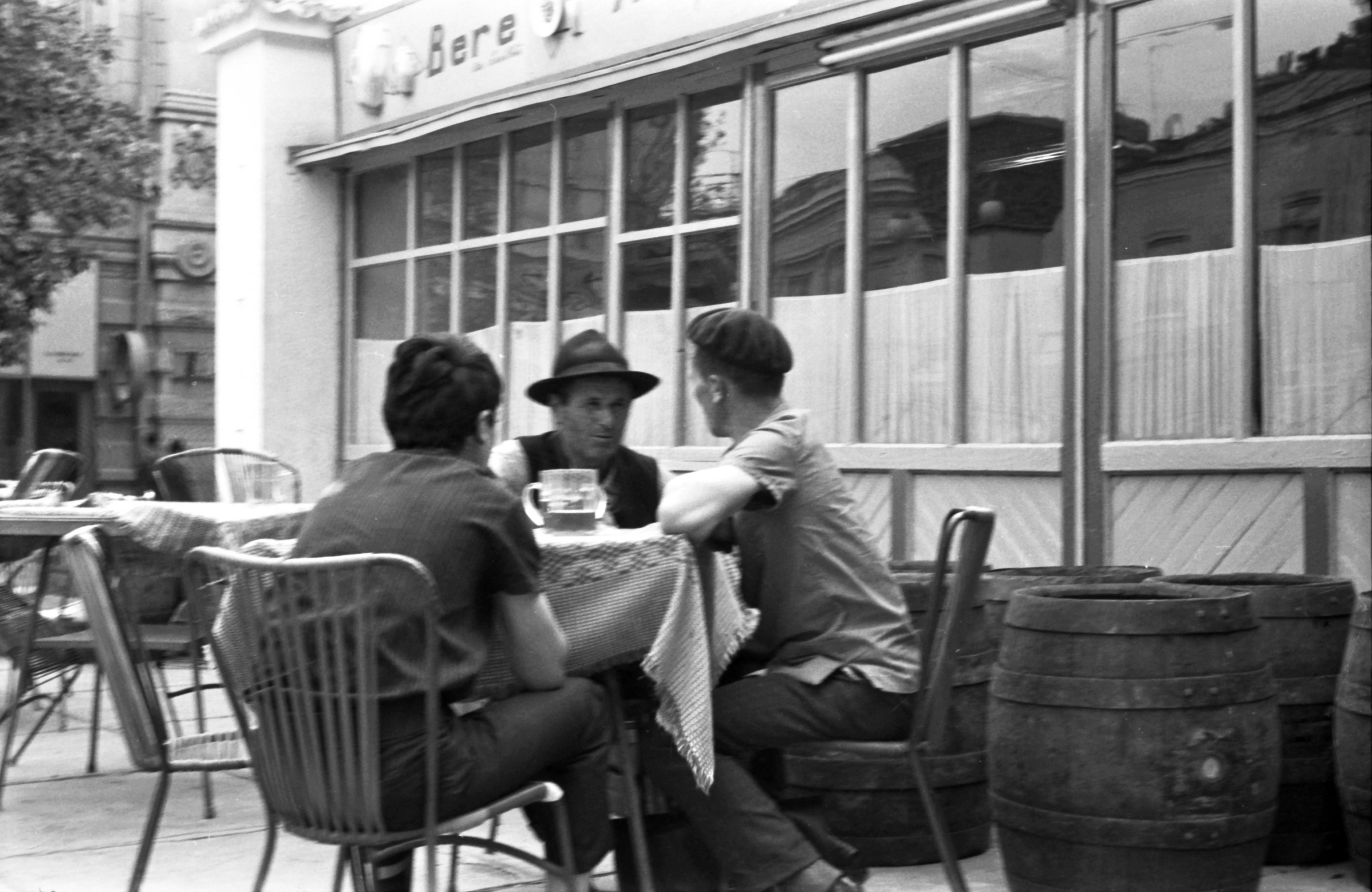
Local Romanian beer pub in 1970.

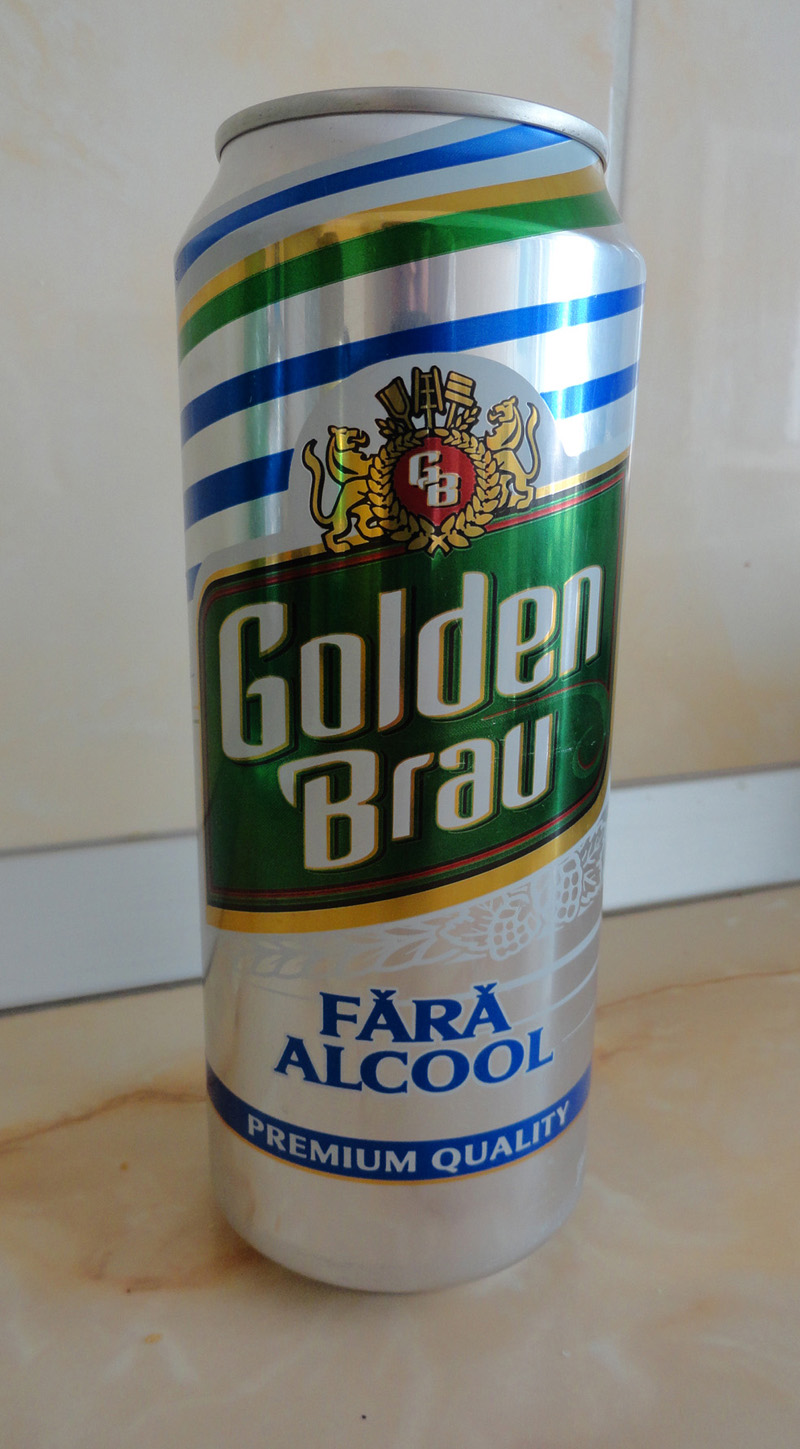
Non-alcoholic Golden Brau

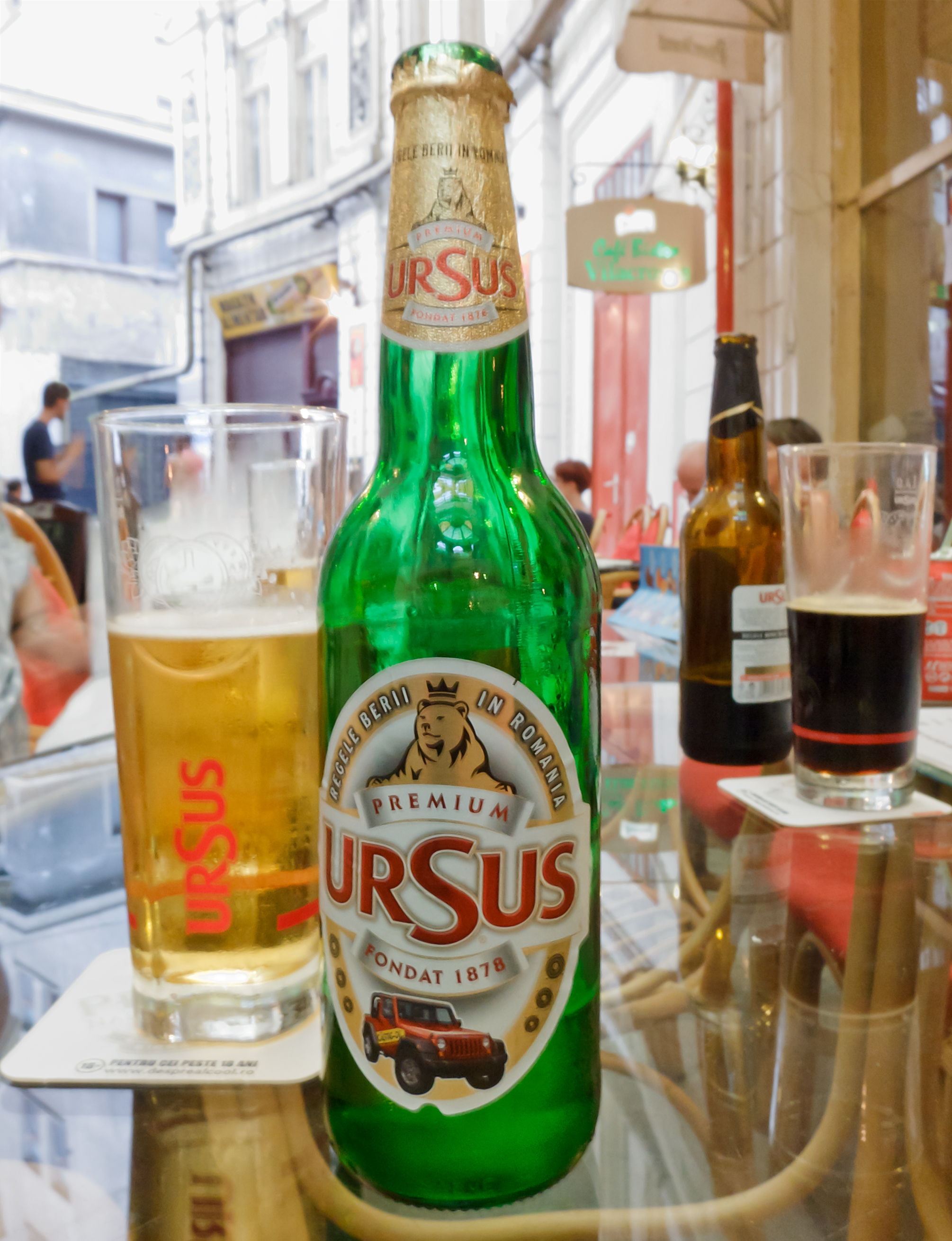
Ursus beer

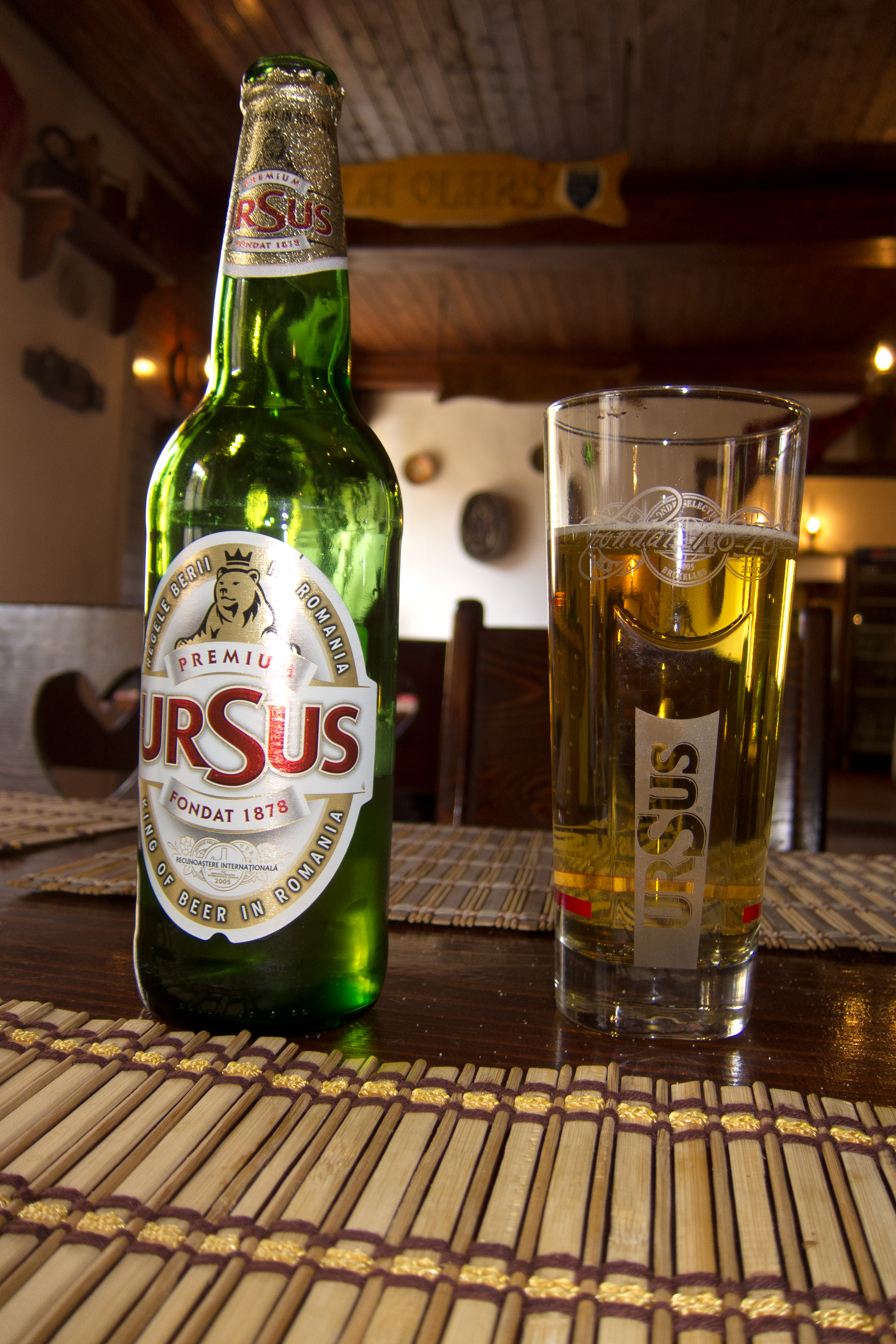
Ursus beer

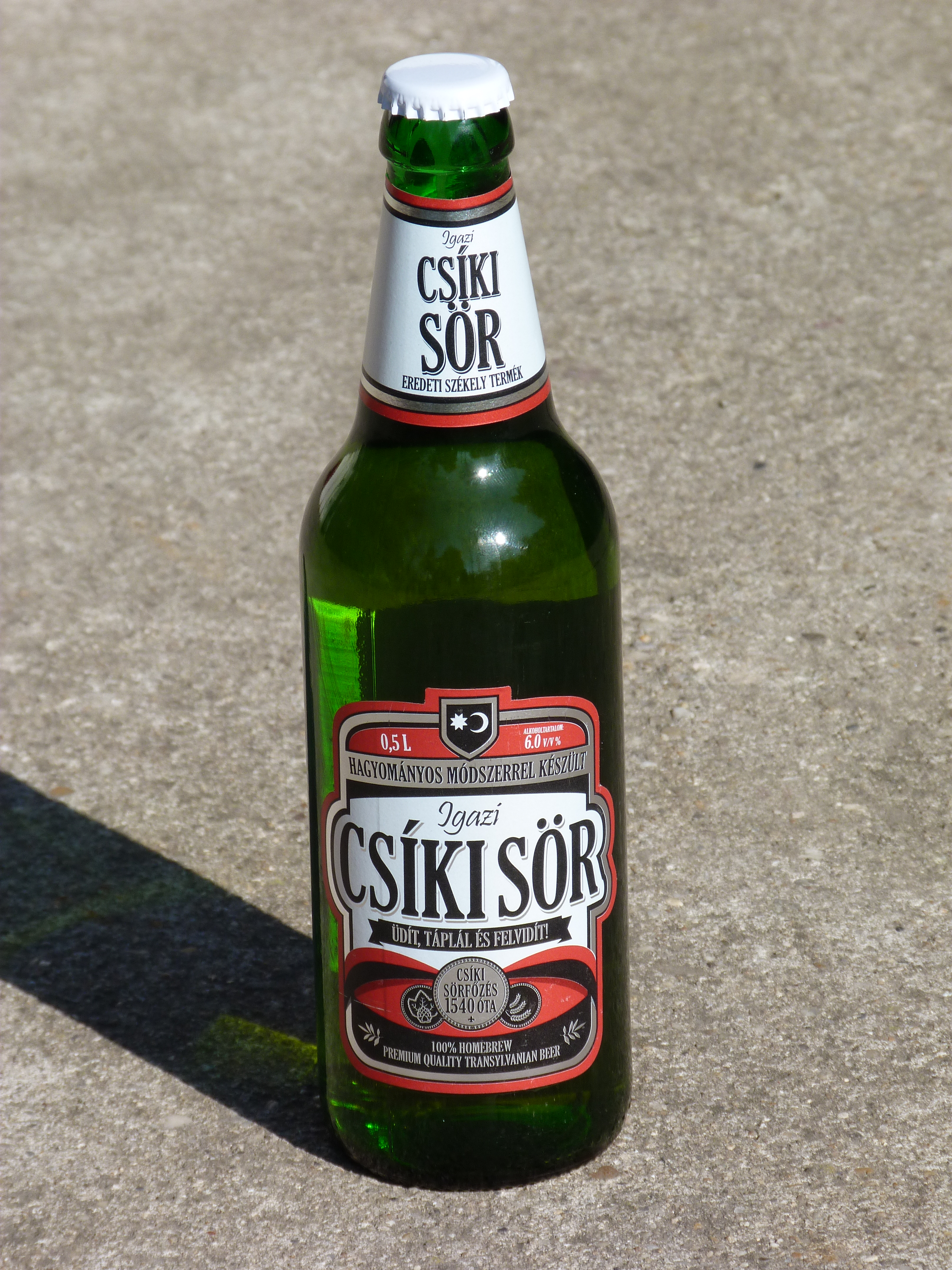
Csíki hand made beer, brewed in Transylvania.

== See also ==
- Beer and breweries by region
