= Raffo =

Raffo may refer to:

== People ==
- Adolfo Ovalle Raffo (born 1997), Chilean footballer
- Al Raffo (born 1941), American baseball player
- Ana María Raffo, Ecuadorian politician
- Carlos Raffo (born 1967), Peruvian politician
- Carlos Alberto Raffo (1926–2013), Argentine footballer
- Carlos Raffo Dasso (1927–2023), Peruvian diplomat and politician
- Claudio Elórtegui Raffo (born 1951), Chilean economist
- Flavio Raffo (born 1972), Italian football coach and a former player
- Giuseppe Raffo (1795–1862), Tunisian businessman and politician
- Heather Raffo, Iraqi-American playwright and actress
- Hernán Raffo (1929–2012), Chilean basketball player
- Juan Carlos Raffo Frávega (1894–1967), Uruguayan politician
- Laura Raffo (born 1973), Uruguayan economist and politician
- Mariano Raffo (born 1973), Argentine film director
- Nicolás Ovalle Raffo (born 2000), Chilean footballer
- Norberto Raffo (1939–2008), Argentine footballer
- Silvio Raffo (born 1947), Italian writer and translator
- Tommy Raffo (born 1967), American college baseball coach and former player

== Places ==
- Raffo, Petralia Soprana, a frazione of Petralia Soprana, Sicily, Italy
- Villa Raffo, a town in Buenos Aires Province, Argentina

== Others ==
- Birra Raffo, a beer brand from Taranto, Apulia, Italy

== See also ==
- Raffa (disambiguation)
