= Ursus Breweries =

Brewing company based in Bucharest, Romania

- Industry: Alcoholic beverage
- Headquarters: Romania
- Number of locations: Timișoara, Buzău and Brașov
- Key people: Michał Mrowiec, President Ursus Breweries
- Products: Beer
- Owner: Asahi Breweries
- Website: Ursus-breweries.ro

Ursus Breweries, a subsidiary of Asahi Breweries Europe Ltd., is a Romanian beer producer. The company is based in Bucharest and owns 3 breweries in Timișoara, Buzău and Brașov as well as a craft mini-brewery in Cluj-Napoca and employs around 1,400 people. Ursus Breweries’ brands are: Ursus, Timișoreana, Ciucaș, Grolsch, Peroni Nastro Azzurro, Redd's, Stejar, Azuga, Pilsner Urquell, St. Stefanus and cider brand Kingswood.

The company was owned by SABMiller from 1996 until March 2017, and by Asahi Breweries Europe Ltd since March 2017.

== History ==
"Bear" in the Mug

Brewing in Cluj began in the Monastery Estate – granted by Stephen Báthory in 1581 to the Jesuits of Cluj, later owned by the Transylvanian Roman Catholic Status, and eventually managed by the Transylvanian Catholic Study Fund in 1868. The exact starting date is lost to history, but what is certain is that by the early 1800s, there was already a brewery, a house where beer was brewed. There were even establishments connected to it that sold the fine drink—essentially a pub network. The brewery was operated by tenants. In 1828, one such lease likely expired, as the Transylvanian Gazette announced: “The Monastery Estate’s brewery, with all the necessary good tools and buildings, located on the corner of the square of the Honorable Free Royal City of Cluj, and with the right to free beer sales in the five villages of the Estate, will be leased to the highest bidder on December 20th.” In today’s terms: the lease rights of the brewery and the beer outlets in Cluj and five other villages were auctioned off.

In 1868, the new manager of the estate, the Catholic Study Fund, leased the Monastery Brewery to the highest bidder, who turned out to be Elek Sigmond, a miller and distiller, and Domokos Biasini, owner of hotels, restaurants, and the former Transylvanian express carriage service. The new entrepreneurs promised to build a modern beer hall and improve transportation from the city center with omnibus services. In 1873, Elek Sigmond’s son, Dezső—later president of the Cluj Chamber of Commerce and Industry—took over the management of the breweries, including the Monastery Brewery. In 1876, the Cluj Court registered the company Sigmond Brothers, which carried on the business empire, with Dezső and his brother Ákos as owners. According to the chamber’s records, their brewery in Monastery produced 2,268, 2,058, 1,890, 1,806, 1,680, 3,696, and 4,158 hectoliters annually between 1881 and 1888.

The 1894 Cluj guide published by the Transylvanian Carpathian Association mentioned the Sigmond Brewery among the city’s notable spots, frequently visited by locals.

For unknown reasons, the Sigmond brothers sold their Cluj distillery and brewery at the turn of the century. The buyer was the company Czell Frigyes and Sons.

The Czell family members were notable citizens of one of Brașov’s suburbs. The elder Frigyes Czell moved to the city center and began working in wool weaving. His son, Frigyes, born in 1816, continued his father’s trade, learning the techniques of finer wool weaving in Vienna and Brno. Returning home, he established a workshop and later a factory, amassing significant wealth. During the 1850s, during a crisis in the domestic spinning and weaving industry, he decided to switch to distillation. In 1854, he established a distillery in Keresztényfalva (Brașov County), which by the 1880s had become one of the largest such companies in Hungary. In 1892, he purchased the bankrupt distillery in Dirste (a former independent village, now part of Brașov) and converted it into a brewery. Production began in 1894, as the Brașov Chamber of Commerce registered their trademark that year. On May 23, 1899, the court registered Czell Frigyes and Sons’ brewery branch, marking the beginning of modern industrial beer production in Cluj.

The local newspaper Magyar Polgár published an advertisement from Czell Frigyes and Sons on April 27, 1901, announcing the reopening of their beer hall at the Monastery Brewery. Two days later, the paper reported that "the Monastery Brewery changed hands, with the distillery and brewery going to the reputable Czell Frigyes and Sons company. The new owner has completely renovated the beer hall, which now meets the standards of the era. It has become one of the most pleasant places for excursions."

The beer industry flourished for almost two decades but was overshadowed by World War I and the subsequent change of regime. On December 19, 1918, Károlyi Mihály's government decided to surrender Cluj without a fight. On Christmas Eve morning, Romanian occupiers arrived, and Cluj, along with Transylvania, became part of the Romanian Kingdom. Nevertheless, brewing and beer drinking continued. The company advertised their beers, which were still of pre-war quality. They resumed brewing their Apát beer, developed to replace missing German brands during the war. This double-malt specialty was said to be as nutritious as the best Munich beers it was designed to replace.

During this time, the city’s intellectual and administrative elite was replaced, with many Hungarians displaced by Romanian authorities. Between 1918 and 1924, nearly 190,000 officials, teachers, and clerks fled to Hungary, becoming the so-called “wagon dwellers.” Romanian workers and consumers soon dominated the local market. The Czell Frigyes and Sons company responded by rebranding their products. In 1923, they renamed their double-malt dark beer Hercules and their light beer Monastery. By June 1924, they introduced a new name for their light beer—Ursus—which remains today, though with some interruptions. The new bear logo, featuring a bear holding two beer bottles, was also registered, though later modified to avoid reminding drinkers of the Hungarian past.

With the new brand came a new beer hall. In 1926, an elegant restaurant and beer hall named the Ursus Beer Hall opened on the site of the old Czell beer hall in the main square. "Even the old establishment was known and loved by everyone: locals and visitors alike, and it was almost proverbial that the best beer could be found here, one that was as good as milk... – informed the public in a paid advertisement in the city’s theater magazine. – The old Czell already had a very good clientele, but the renovated, beautifully furnished new restaurant is expected to attract even more guests. The premises continue to be owned by the Cluj Czell brewery, and the Czell family strives to ensure that both the kitchen and the drinks, as well as the service, remain impeccable.”

With the appearance of the new name, the Czell Frigyes and Sons empire split into two: Czell Károly of Brașov, and the company group of Dr. Czell Vilmos, which owned the Cluj brewery. The latter encountered financial difficulties in 1926 due to high interest rates that it could not manage. As a result, three financial institutions from Brașov took over the Kolozsmonostor brewery in exchange for loans previously extended. The company had to take loans because its factories were destroyed during the war and had to be rebuilt. Additionally, under the Romanian land reform, their estates were confiscated, ending their raw material production. Furthermore, beer consumption in the country had fallen by fifty percent due to financial difficulties compared to the previous period. The restructuring efforts were unsuccessful, and the company requested a six-month payment moratorium from the court. In 1927, the Cluj brewery was re-established under the name Ursus Brewery Joint Stock Company with new capital injection. However, this did not solve the problem even temporarily. The main shareholder, the Brașov General Savings Bank, which also provided overdraft loans, did not want to further increase its losses and decided to sell. The buyer was the Turda Brewery, owned equally by Farkas Imre of Bisztra (whose nephew, Farkas Ferenc, later became a minister in the government of Imre Nagy) and Simon Lázár. They hoped to eliminate competition and reduce costs through rationalizing production. The deal was called a merger, and the new company was named Ursus United Cluj and Turda Breweries Inc.

The economic crisis continued to worsen, and people were slowly giving up even on eating, let alone drinking beer. In May 1930, 75% less beer was consumed in Transylvania than in the same period the previous year. Manufacturers tried to encourage the remaining citizens with incomes to drink beer through price cuts, production restrictions, and promotional campaigns. As a result, in March 1931, the Ursus Brewery organized a spectacular parade through the streets of Cluj. The beer king sat on top of the first truck, dressed in a purple cloak with a crown on his head, while the second and third vehicles had signs in Hungarian, German, and Romanian informing the public that beer had become cheaper. On the platform of the middle truck, a tavern was set up, where girls and boys in festive attire sat around tables with beer pitchers, while a gypsy band played in the corner, naturally.

Even grander ideas were conceived to overcome the crisis. The Transylvanian and Banat Brewers' Association—also referred to as the beer cartel in the press—developed market-regulating measures for its members. They lowered prices and introduced production quotas. Any violators faced penalties, which were secured by depositing promissory notes. We won’t delve into how one capital group outwitted the others here, but what matters is that the owners' meeting dissolved the association. The crisis worsened, and production continued to decline.

The return of Northern Transylvania and Székely Land, the introduction of Hungarian administration, the government’s economic development measures, new market opportunities, and, not least, the wartime boom reversed the trend. Beer consumption also slowly began to increase. Hungarian breweries had already agreed in December 1940 that the Cluj factory could also supply Budapest. According to the Transylvanian volume of the Christian Hungarian Public Almanac, published in 1941, Ursus United Cluj and Turda Breweries Inc. produced 32,000 hectoliters that year, which was half of its capacity. Their dark beer was marketed under the Gloria brand, while their light beer was sold as Ursus. After some personnel changes, the board members became Imre Farkas of Bisztra, Dr. András Somodi, József Sacelláry, Bálint Török, Dr. János Popescu, and Gábor Farkas.

On August 23, Romania switched sides and attacked its former allies. To avoid destruction, the wartime leadership decided to evacuate Székely Land and later Cluj without a fight. The first Soviet units arrived in the treasure city at dawn on October 11, followed by nearly six months of military administration, after which Romania reoccupied the area.

The brewery was nationalized in 1948 and later developed into a large socialist enterprise. By 1974, its production had reached 424,000 hectoliters annually. The Ceaușescu regime also brought its "golden age" here. Anyone who tasted Cluj beer in the 1980s may still remember what it was like…"

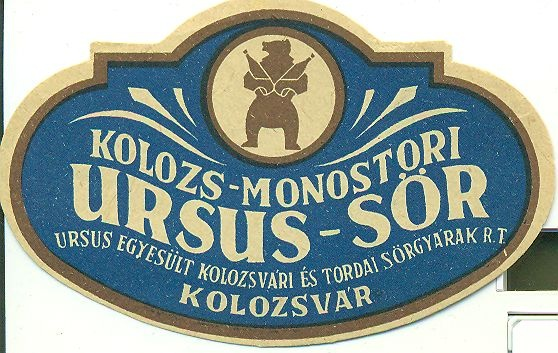
Kolozsi-Monostori_Ursus-sör

In 1996, the South African Breweries purchased Vulturul Buzau. A year later, South African Breweries acquired Pitber Pitesti and Ursus S.A. Cluj-Napoca. In 2001, Ursus S.A. bought the majority stake of Timisoreana Beer S.A. In 2002, Ursus S.A. and Timisoreana SA merged into a single integrated company, named Romania Beer Company S.A. In 2004, SABMiller plc (formerly named South African Breweries) acquired the majority stake of Aurora Brasov, a company that merged in the same year with Romania Beer Company S.A. A year later, in 2005, the new name of SABMiller's operations in Romania became Ursus Breweries.

In 2014, Igor Tikhonov was appointed CEO of Ursus Breweries.

On the 31st of March, 2017 Asahi Group Holdings Ltd. had completed the purchase of Ursus Breweries in a transaction that included the former SABMiller Central and Eastern European businesses and brands. Its CEO stated that the acquisition would not change Ursus Breweries' line of business.

== Breweries ==
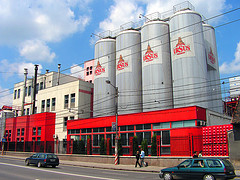
Cluj-Napoca Brewery

- Cluj–Napoca Craft Mini-Brewery: The modern history of the Cluj-Napoca brewery, which has a bear as its emblem, started in 1878. On 7 July 2011, the old brewery was replaced by a craft Mini-Brewery. The brewery is open to the public. The craft Mini-Brewery is actually named "Fabrica de Bere Ursus".
- Timișoara Brewery: Established in 1718 at the initiative of the Austrian authorities ruled by Prince Eugene of Savoy. The brewery provided beer in a town that did not have drinkable water. The Timișoara brewery introduced the beer filter in 1920 in Romania, and aluminum kegs (instead of wooden kegs) in 1968.
- Brașov Brewery: In 1892, Friedrich Czell & Sons Corporation acquired the Darste distilling plant and built a new brewery. In 1922, Alexandru Petit wrote in the Brasov's Monograph about the increased manpower of 130 employees and a rise in the annual beer and malt productivity to 40.000 hl and 80-90 wagons respectively. Following the nationalization in 1948, the Darste brewery and alcohol plant changed its name into "Aurora". In 1995, S.C. Aurora S.A. became a private company with 100% Romanian private capital.
- Buzău Brewery: The brewery in Buzau became operational in 1978 and had a production capacity of 500,000 hl/year. In 1991 the company became a joint-stock company and changed its name to S.C. "Vulturul S.A." Buzau and in 1996 the brewery was purchased by the South African Breweries. Ursus Breweries started two investment projects in 2005 with a total value of EUR 50 million for the expansion and development of the brewery. The investment project was completed in 2009, the last investment stage being of EUR 42 million.

== Brands ==
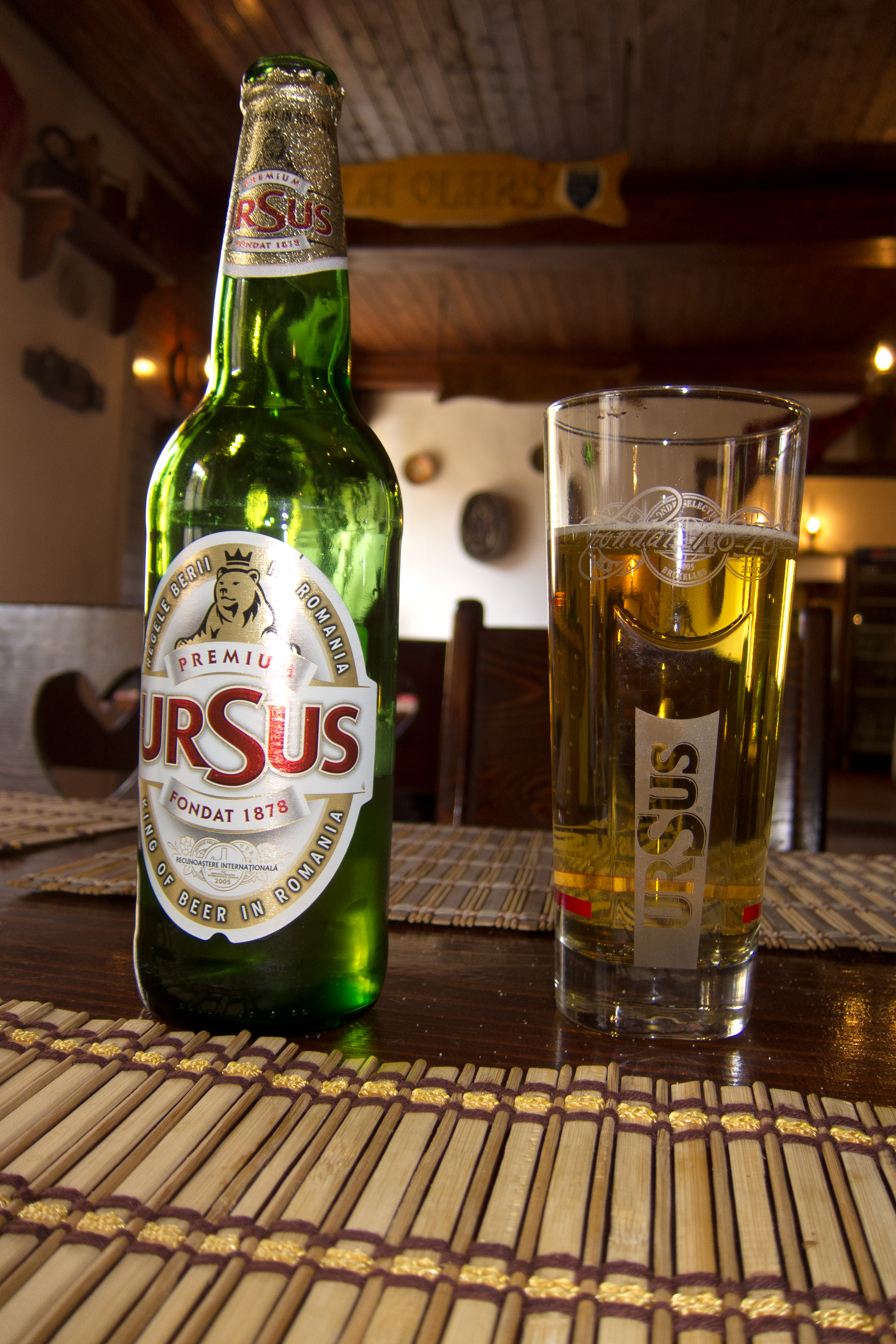
Ursus (beer)

- Ursus Premium, Ursus Fără Alcool, Ursus Nefiltrată, Ursus La Tank, Ursus Retro Carpatin, Ursus Black Grizly, Ursus Cherry Lager Cireșar, Pale Ale Panda, Ursus Cooler Cireșe, Ursus Cooler Grepfrut, Ursus Cooler Lămâie, Ursus Cooler Mango și Lime
- Timișoreana, Timișoreana Nepasteurizată
- Ciucaș, Ciucas Malzbier
- Stejar
- Azuga Nepasteurizată
- Peroni Nastro Azzurro
- Grolsch, Grolsch Weizen
- Redd's
- Pilsner Urquell
- Efes, Efes Draft
- St. Stefanus

== See also ==
- Asahi Breweries
- Beer in Romania
