= CR Snow =

Largest brewing company in China

China Resources Snow Breweries Ltd.
- Industry: Brewing
- Founded: 1993
- Headquarters: Dongcheng, Beijing, China
- Key people: Humor Wang (General Manager)
- Products: Beer
- Parent: China Resources Enterprise

CR Snow (officially China Resources Snow Breweries Ltd.) is a brewing company with its headquarters in Beijing, China. Originally known as Shenyang Snow Beer Company before acquired by China Resources Enterprise, it was a joint venture between China Resources Enterprise and the UK based multinational SABMiller, but is now fully owned by the former. It is the biggest brewing company in China, with a market share of around 21 per cent and sold a total of 9.28 billion litres of beer in China in 2010.

== History ==
In July 2011 CR Snow acquired a 49 percent stake in Jiangsu Dafuhao Breweries and 100 percent of Shanghai Asia Pacific Brewery from Heineken International for 870 million yuan (US$134.42 million).

== Brands ==
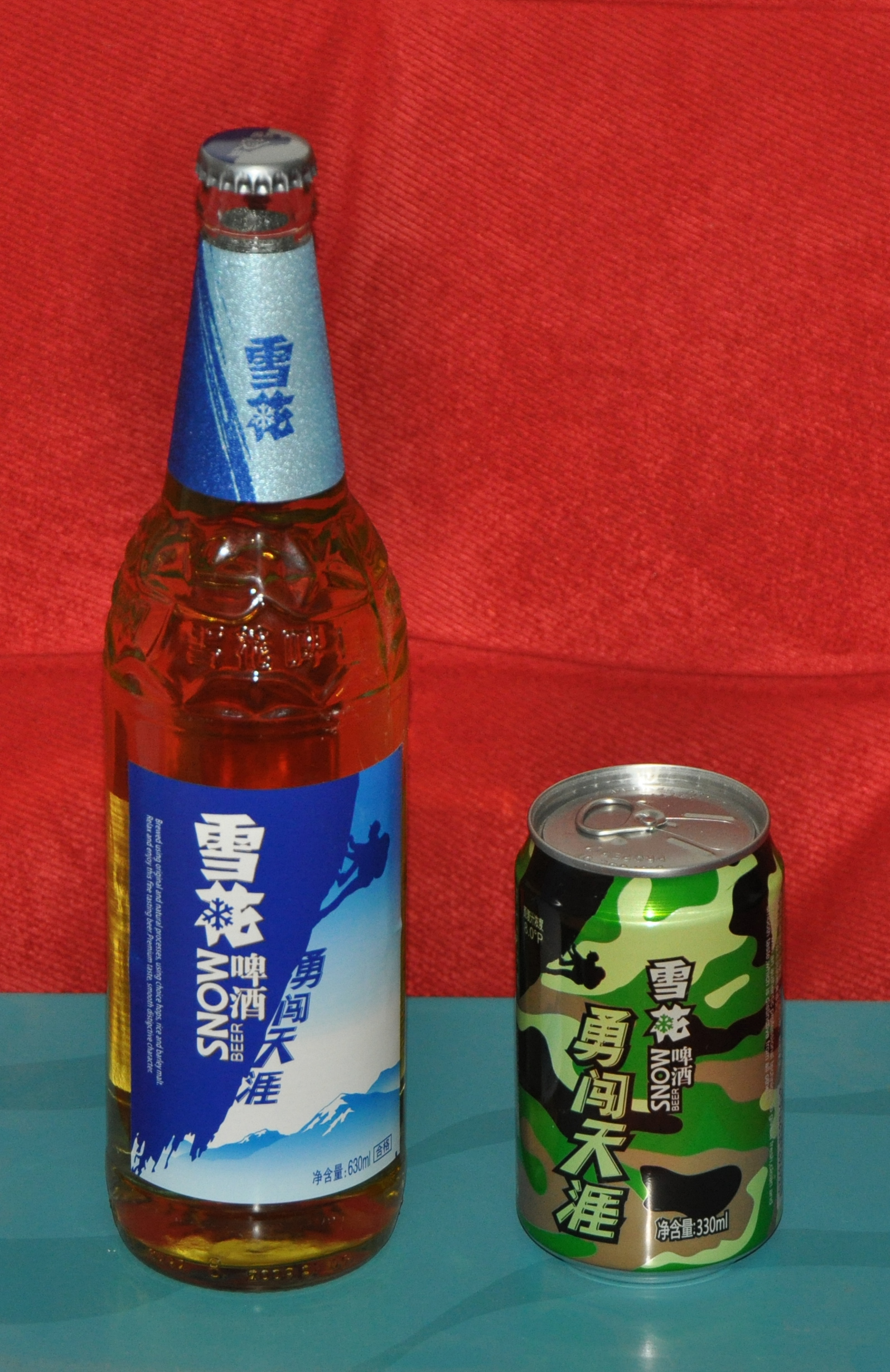
Snow beer in a bottle and a can

CR Snow's principal brand is Snow, which is currently the biggest-selling beer in the world measured by volume, with sales of around 16.5 billion pints in 2010. Its other brands include Blue Sword, Green Leaves, Huadan, Huadan Yate, Largo, Löwen, New Three Star, Shengquan, Shenyang, Singo, Sip, Tianjin, Yatai, Yingshi and Zero Clock.

== See also ==
- Beer in China
