= Snow (beer) =

Brand of beer in China

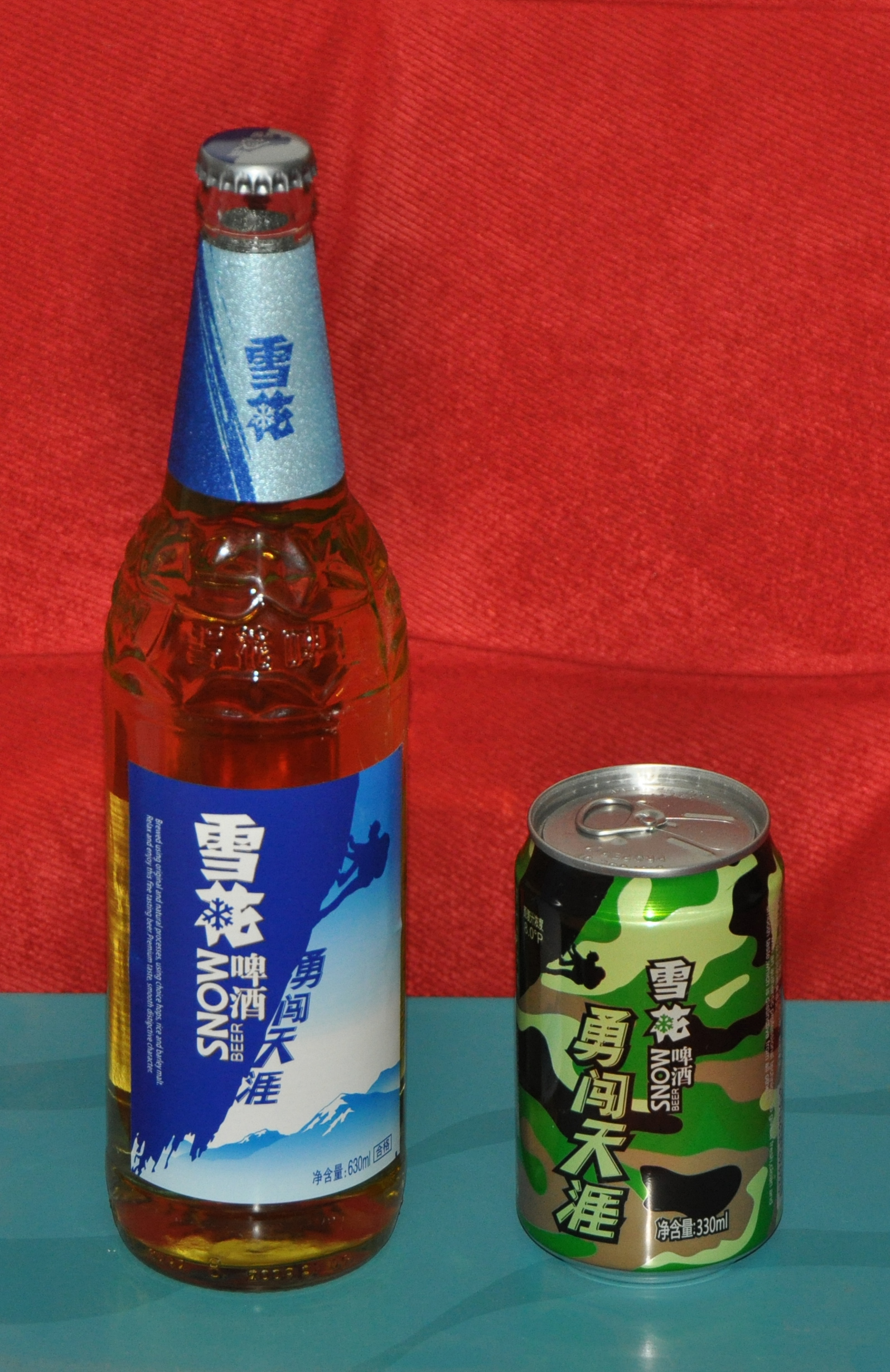
- Snow beer in a bottle and a can
- Type: Lager
- Manufacturer: CR Snow
- Origin: China
- Introduced: 1957; 69 years ago Shenyang, China
- Alcohol by volume: 5%
- Website: www.snowbeer.com.cn

Snow (Chinese: 雪花啤酒; lit. 'Snowflake beer') is a brand of lager beer from Shenyang, China. It is known popularly as ‘Snowflake’. It is brewed by CR Snow, that (until October 2016) was a joint venture between SABMiller and China Resources Enterprises. When Snow was first released in 1993, it was produced by three breweries. As of 2014, CRSB was the largest brewing company in China with over 90 breweries across the country, brewing more than 10 billion litres of Snow every year.

By 2016, SABMiller owned 49 percent of Snow Beer. Before acquiring SABMiller, Anheuser-Busch InBev had agreed to sell its interests in Snow to China Resources Enterprise (for $1.6 billion) to satisfy regulators.

In 2018, Heineken signed an agreement with China Resources Enterprises to purchase a 40% stake into the company.

Snow beer is the best-selling beer brand in the world, despite largely being sold only in China. However, Snow includes a large range of beers; when Budweiser, Bud Light and the other members of the Budweiser family are counted as a single brand, they easily top the sales charts and also brew over 10 billion liters a year.

== Shenyang Snow Beer ==
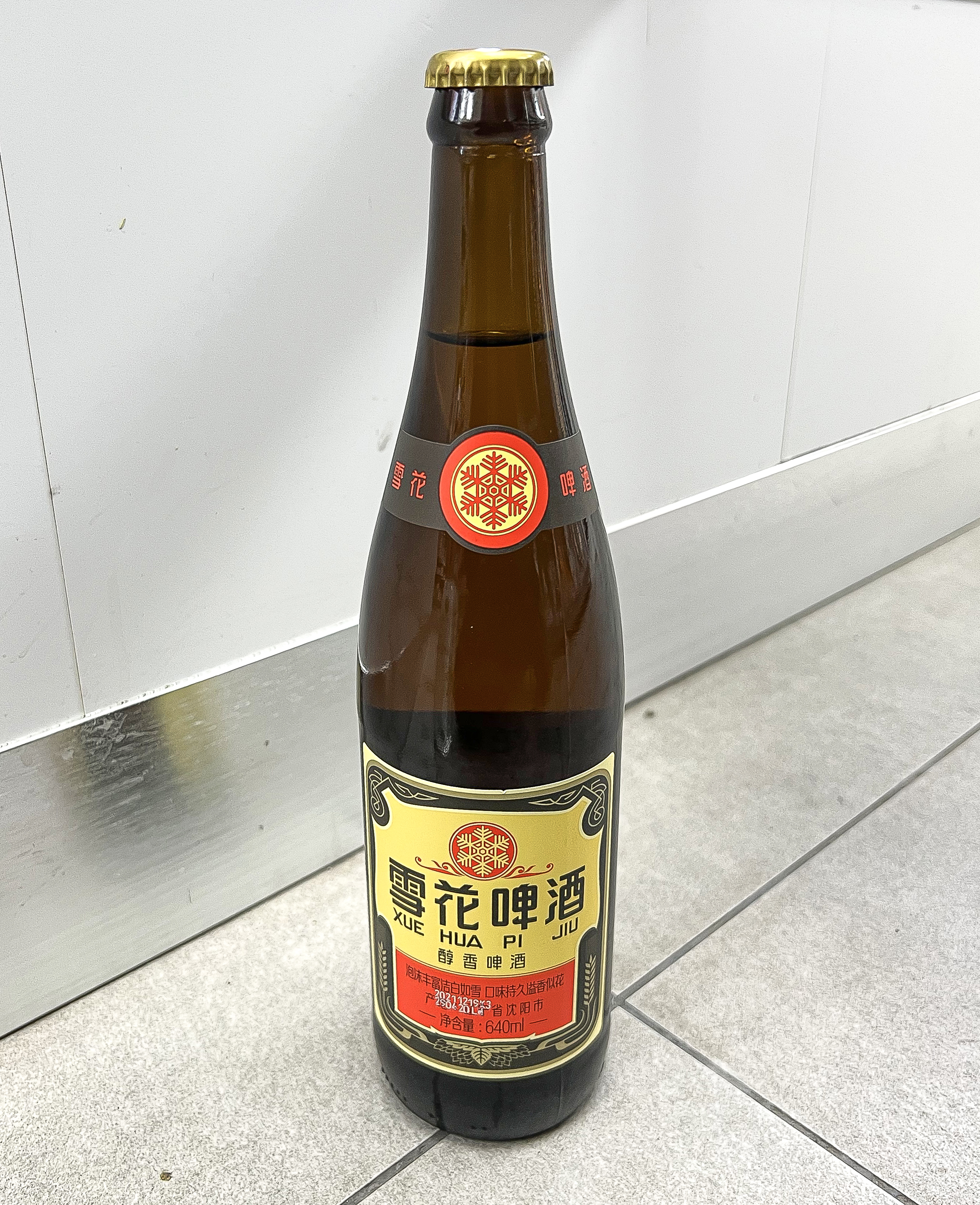
"Old Snow" variant originated from Shenyang in 1964

Manchuria Beer (Japanese: 満州麦酒), established in 1934 by Dai Nippon Beer (Japanese: 大日本麦酒), and Kirin Beer jointly, completed its second factory in 1936 at the current address of Jianshe East Road (Chinese: 建设东路), Tiexi District, Shenyang, at Xinggong North Street. This factory became Liaoning Province Brewing Company in 1945, Shenyang Beer Company in 1949, and came to be known as "Snow Beer" (Chinese: 雪花啤酒) from 1957. In 1997, China Resources Enterprise acquired this factory as part of Huarun Snow Beer Company (China). It has since been known as Shenyang Huarun Snow Beer (Chinese: 沈阳华润雪花啤酒).
