= Gruppo TUO =

Italian holding company

- Industry: Retail
- Founded: 1994
- Headquarters: Rome (RM), Italy
- Number of locations: 140 points of sales
- Area served: Lazio; Tuscany
- Key people: Antonino Faranda (founder)
- Products: Food and consumer goods
- Website: www.tuodi.it

Gruppo TUO is an Italian holding company dealing, through its subsidiaries, in the beverages and catering large-scale distribution sector. It was founded by Italian entrepreneur Antonino Faranda. He was awarded Cavaliere del Lavoro of the Order of Merit for Labour on May 29, 2009.

The group owns the Italian discount supermarket chains Tuodì, InGrande and Fresco Market. In 2011 the Italian brewing company Peroni Brewery has agreed on the sale of the entire share capital of Doreca srl, the holding company of the Doreca distribution group, to Gruppo TUO. In 2015 Gruppo TUO was among the five major supermarket chains in Italy.
