= Birra Raffo =

Italian lager brand

- Logo used since October 2023
- Location: Rome, Lazio, Italy
- Opened: 1919 (107 years ago) in Taranto, Apulia, Italy
- Parent: Peroni; Asahi
- Distribution: Italy (since 2024)
- Website: birraraffo.it

Raffo is an Italian lager beer produced from 1919 to 1987 in its homonymous brewery in Taranto, after which production was moved to Bari. In 1961, the brand was transferred to Peroni and today, Raffo is produced in the Peroni Brewery in Rome. Peroni, previously belonging to the South African SABMiller, was sold in 2016 to the Japanese group Asahi.

== History ==
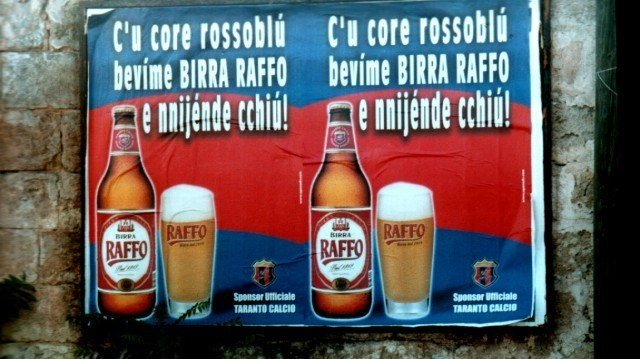
A Raffo advertisement in the Tarantino dialect

Raffo dates to 1919, when Vitantonio Raffo established the brewery in Taranto. Raffo was family-owned until 1961, when it was sold to Peroni, which kept the original recipe, brewery, and employees. In the 1970s, 48,000 hectoliters were produced, thanks to the beer's diffusion in Basilicata, Lazio, and Campania. The region of Apulia always maintained the highest consumption.

In 1987, Peroni decided to close its brewery in Taranto and transfer production to Bari, putting an end to an important chapter of the city's industrial history. Nonetheless, Raffo continued to be the most popular beer of Taranto.

In 2008, Peroni added Taras, the symbol of Taranto, to the beer's label. The beer sponsors the city's Taranto Football Club 1927.

Since 2024, Raffo has been available on the entire territory of Italy.
