= MillerCoors =

Former beer brewing company in the United States

MillerCoors LLC
- Industry: Beverages
- Founded: 2008
- Defunct: 2020
- Fate: Acquired by Molson Coors in 2016, Folded into Molson Coors North America in 2020
- Headquarters: Chicago, United States
- Products: Beer
- Parent: Molson Coors

MillerCoors was a beer brewing company in the United States. MillerCoors was formed in 2008 as a joint venture between SABMiller and Molson Coors to combine their brewing, marketing and sales operations in the United States. The company was acquired by Molson Coors in 2016. In 2019 it was announced that MillerCoors and Molson Coors Canada would be consolidated into a single business unit under the name Molson Coors North America.

== History ==
=== Joint venture with SABMiller ===
MillerCoors was announced as a joint venture between SABMiller and Molson Coors in October 2007 and was approved by regulators on June 5, 2008. The venture was completed on June 30, 2008, and MillerCoors began operation on July 1, 2008.

On September 14, 2015, MillerCoors announced that it would shut down its Eden, North Carolina brewery in September 2016 due to declining corporate sales. The company has plants in Virginia and Georgia that serve the Eden plant's distribution area. In May 2016, the Milwaukee Journal Sentinel reported that Pabst Brewing Company and Blue Ribbon Intermediate Holdings filed a lawsuit because Pabst wanted to continue making its beers in Eden. Before a verdict was rendered, the two companies reached a settlement in late November 2018. Under the settlement, MillerCoors and Pabst resolved their dispute and ended the litigation.

=== Sole ownership by Molson Coors ===
During the merger discussions between AB InBev and SABMiller in 2015, the U.S. Department of Justice (DOJ) agreed to the proposed deal only on the basis that SABMiller "spins off all its MillerCoors holdings in the U.S.—which include both Miller- and Coors-held brands—along with its Miller brands outside the U.S." The entire ownership situation was complicated: "In the United States, Coors is majority owned [58%] by MillerCoors (a subsidiary of SABMiller) and minority owned by Molson Coors, though internationally it's entirely owned by Molson Coors, and Miller is owned by SABMiller." SABMiller agreed to divest itself of the Miller brands by selling its stake in MillerCoors to Molson Coors.

On October 11, 2016, SABMiller sold its stake in MillerCoors for around US$12 billion after the company was acquired by AB InBev, making Molson Coors the 100 percent owner of MillerCoors. Molson Coors also retained "the rights to all of the brands currently in the MillerCoors portfolio for the U.S. and Puerto Rico, including Redd's and import brands such as Peroni, Grolsch and Pilsner Urquell." The agreement made Molson Coors the world's third largest brewer.

=== 2020 Molson Coors corporate restructuring ===
On January 1, 2020, Molson Coors Brewing Company changed its name to Molson Coors Beverage Company. This was part of a corporate restructuring that reorganized the company's four business units into Molson Coors North America and Molson Coors Europe and retired the MillerCoors corporate brand name.

== See also ==
- Miller Brewing Company
- Coors Brewing Company
- Molson Coors Beverage Company
