= Topvar =

Beer brewing company in Slovakia

Topvar Breweries
- Native name: Slovak: Pivovary Topvar, a. s.
- Predecessors: Šariš; Topvar
- Founded: January 1, 2007; 18 years ago
- Parent: SABMiller(2007-2017); Asahi Breweries (from 2017)
- Website: pivovarytopvar.sk

Topvar Breweries (Slovak: Pivovary Topvar, a. s.) is a beer brewing company in Slovakia. The company was created by the merger of the Šariš and Topvar breweries on 1 January 2007, after both were purchased by global brewing giant SABMiller in 2006. Subsequently, as part of the agreements made with regulators before Anheuser-Busch InBev was allowed to acquire SABMiller in October 2016, Topvar was sold to Asahi Breweries of Japan on December 13, 2016; the deal is expected to close during the first half of 2017.

The original Topvar Brewery was founded in 1957 and the first Topvar beer was brewed in Topoľčany in 1964. In 2007, the beer brewing operation was relocated to Veľký Šariš.

== Products ==
- 10% Light
- 11% Dark
- 11% keg-beer
- 12% Light
