= China Resources Beer =

Chinese brewing company

China Resources Beer (Holdings) Company Limited
- Native name: 華潤啤酒（控股）有限公司
- Formerly: China Resources Enterprise
- Type: Public
- Traded as: SEHK: 291; Hang Seng Index
- Industry: Conglomerate
- Founded: 1992; 34 years ago
- Headquarters: Hong Kong
- Area served: Mainland China; Hong Kong
- Parent: China Resources Holdings
- Website: crbeer.com.hk

China Resources Beer is a subsidiary of China Resources Holdings. Its assets include a 51% share in CR Snow, the largest brewing company in China and a joint venture with SAB Miller.

== Background ==
The company was previously part of China Resources Enterprise before it sold its non-beer business to China Resources Holdings and rebranded to China Resources Beer in September 2015.

It is a Hang Seng Index Constituent Stock (blue chip) and is Hang Seng China-Affiliated Corporations Index Constitute Stock (red chip) in the Hong Kong stock market.

== See also ==
- China Resources
- Beer and breweries in China
