= Birrificio Angelo Poretti =

Italian brewing company

Coordinates: 45.84938°N 8.82569°E

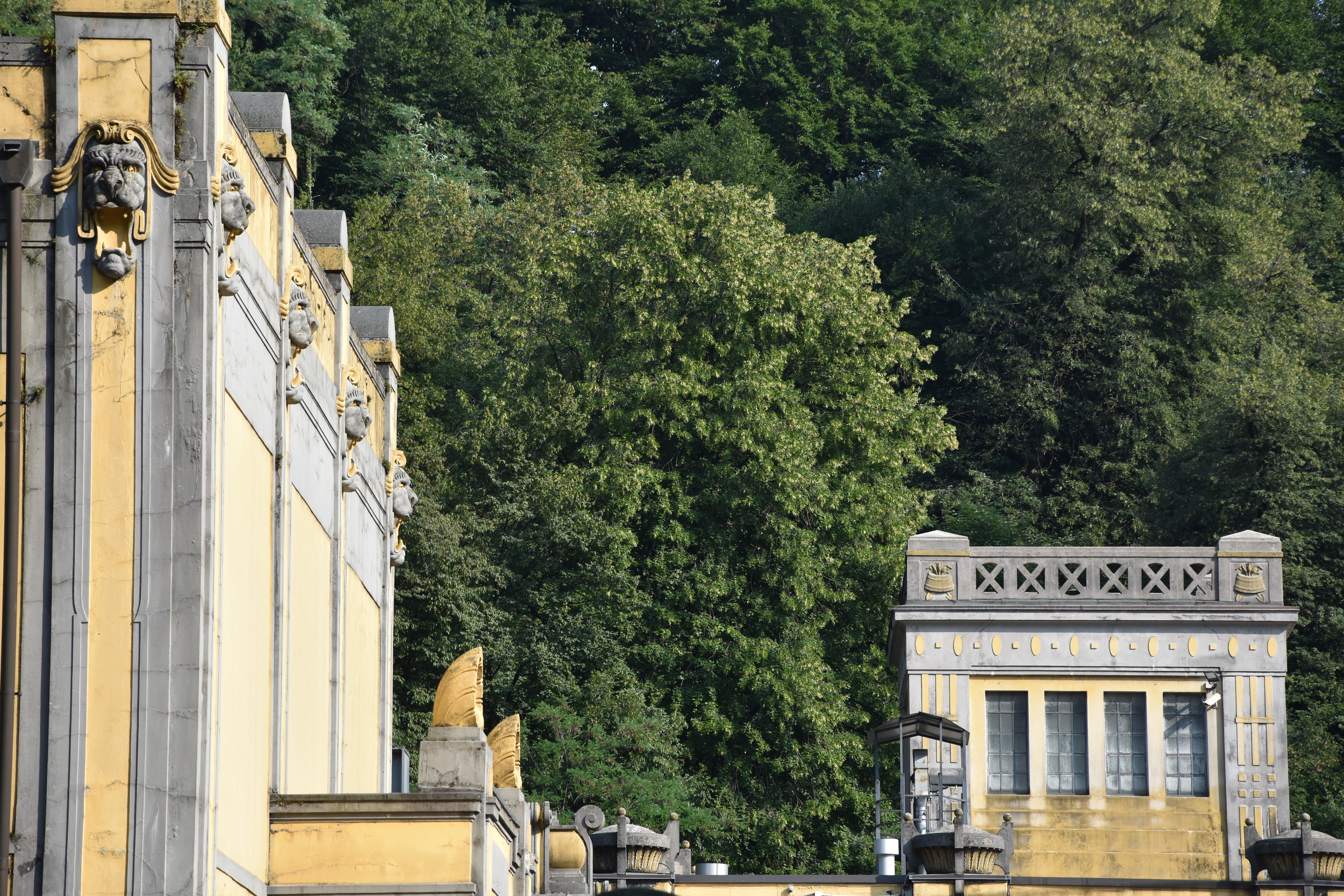
- Industry: Alcoholic beverage
- Founded: 1877
- Headquarters: Induno Olona, Italy
- Products: Beer
- Owner: Carlsberg Group

Birrificio Angelo Poretti is an Italian brewing company located in Varese.

The brewery was founded in 1877 by Angelo Poretti in Induno Olona. In 1939, the company passed to the Bassetti family, who owned the Splügen brewery in Chiavenna. In 1982 the Carlsberg Group bought 50% of the shares from the company, followed in 1998 by a further 25%. In 2002, the Danish group acquired the remaining 25% and thus obtained full ownership of the company from Induno Olona.

== Products ==
- 3 Luppoli (Splügen) (4.8% ABV) gold yellow coloured;
- 4 Luppoli Originale (5%, low fermentation lager)
- 5 Luppoli Bock Chiara (6.5%, double malted)
- 6 Luppoli Bock Rossa (7.0%, double malted, red coloured)
- Non Filtrata ai 7 Luppoli (7%, unfiltered beer, Vienna lager, amber lager) (four different for every season)
- 8 Luppoli Saison Chiara (6% saison, amber)
- 9 Luppoli witbier (5.2% wit, amber
- 9 Luppoli porter (5.5% porter draught)
- 9 Luppoli India Pale Ale (5.9% India pale ale, amber)
- 10 Luppoli Birra Champagne (6% champagne)
