= Wührer =

Wührer is a surname (Anglicized spellings: Wuehrer, Wuhrer). Notable people with the surname include:

- Friedrich Wührer (1900–1975), Austrian-German pianist
- Kari Wuhrer (born 1967), American actress, model, and singer
