= SABMiller =

Multinational brewing and beverage company

SABMiller plc
- Formerly: SAB plc (1999-2002)
- Type: Public
- Traded as: LSE: SAB; JSE: SAB
- Industry: Brewery
- Founded: 1999; 27 years ago
- Defunct: 10 October 2016; 10 years ago
- Fate: Acquired by AB InBev
- Headquarters: London, United Kingdom
- Subsidiaries: South African Breweries

SABMiller plc was an Anglo–South African multinational brewing and beverage company headquartered in Woking, England, on the outskirts of London until 10 October 2016 when it was acquired by AB InBev for US$107-billion. It was the world's second-largest brewer measured by revenues (after Anheuser-Busch InBev) and was also a major bottler of Coca-Cola. Its brands included Foster's, Miller, and Pilsner Urquell. It operated in 80 countries worldwide and in 2009 sold around 21 billion litres of beverages. Since 10 October 2016, SABMiller is a business division of AB InBev, a Belgian multinational corporation with headquarters in Leuven.

SABMiller was founded as South African Breweries in 1895 to serve a growing market of miners and prospectors in and around Johannesburg. Two years later, it became the first industrial company to list on the Johannesburg Stock Exchange. From the early 1990s onwards, the company increasingly expanded internationally, making several acquisitions in both emerging and developed markets. In 1999, it formed a new UK-based holding company, SAB plc, and moved its primary listing to London. In May 2002, SAB plc acquired Miller Brewing, forming SABMiller plc.

The acquisition of SABMiller by Anheuser-Busch InBev on 10 October 2016 ended the corporate use of the name SABMiller; this entity became a business division of Anheuser-Busch InBev SA/NV. Anheuser-Busch InBev SA/NV (abbreviated as AB InBev) began trading on the Brussels Stock Exchange as ABI, as BUD on the New York stock exchange and as ANH on the Johannesburg market. SABMiller ceased trading on global stock markets

The company divested itself of its interests in the MillerCoors beer company to Molson Coors. On 21 December 2016, the company agreed to sell the former SABMiller Ltd. business in Eastern Europe to Asahi Breweries. AB InBev had previously agreed to sell Grolsch Brewery, Peroni Brewery and Meantime Brewery to Asahi; that deal closed on 12 October 2016. On the same day, the sale of SABMiller's 49 per cent share in the world's largest volume beer brand, Snow beer to China Resources Enterprise was also closed.

Anheuser-Busch InBev SA/NV is also selling much of an SABMiller's subsidiary that was bottling and distributing Coca-Cola to the Coca-Cola Company. The affected regions include Zambia, Zimbabwe, Botswana, Swaziland, Lesotho, El Salvador and Honduras.

Companies such as South African Breweries and Carlton & United Brewing that were subsidiaries of SABMiller, and were not sold after SABMiller was acquired by Anheuser-Busch InBev SA/NV, are now subsidiaries of AB InBev. CUB was sold to Asahi in July 2020.

== Pre-acquisition history ==
The origins of the company date back to the foundation of South African Breweries in 1895 in South Africa. For many decades, the operations of South African Breweries were mainly limited to southern Africa, where it had established a dominant position in the market during South African Apartheid, until 1990 when it began investing in Europe.

In 1999, after listing on the London Stock Exchange to raise capital for acquisitions, the group purchased the Miller Brewing Company in North America from the Altria Group in 2002, and changed its name to SABMiller.

Following this, the group's next major acquisition was of a major interest in Bavaria S. A., South America's second largest brewer and owner of the Aguila and Club Colombia brands in 2005.

In 2008, SABMiller and Molson Coors created MillerCoors, a joint venture to produce beverages in the United States.

The company became engaged in the hostile takeover of Fosters in August 2011, and in September 2011 the board of Foster's agreed to a takeover bid valuing the company at A$9.9bn (US$10.2bn; £6.5bn). The deal was completed by the end of 2011, but excluded the Foster's lager brand in the UK and Europe, where it is owned by Heineken.

In November 2011, SABMiller launched Impala Cervejas in Africa, the first commercially produced cassava beer, although Africans have been making cassava home brews for generations. The taste is described as "somewhat bitter, somewhat tangy, not sweet".

In 2013, the company joined leading alcohol producers as part of a producers' commitments to reducing harmful drinking.

In July 2014, the company announced it was divesting its 39.6 per cent stake in casino and hotel group Tsogo Sun Holdings Limited through institutional share placements and a partial buy-back from Tsogo Sun. SABMiller's stake at the time was valued at approximately ZAR11.7 billion (US$1.09 billion).

In September 2014, the company made an unsuccessful attempt to acquire a controlling stake in Dutch rival Heineken International, a move Bloomberg states was part of SABMiller's strategy to protect itself from a potential takeover bid from Anheuser-Busch InBev.

On 27 November 2014, it was announced that SABMiller, The Coca-Cola Company and Gutsche Family Investments had agreed to combine the bottling operations of their non-alcoholic ready-to-drink beverages businesses in southern and east Africa. The new bottler, Coca-Cola Beverages Africa, will serve 12 high-growth countries accounting for approximately 40 per cent of all Coca-Cola beverage volumes in Africa. SABMiller will hold 57 per cent shareholding in the proposed venture.

In May 2015, SABMiller announced it would acquire British brewery company Meantime Brewing for an undisclosed fee.

=== Acquired by Anheuser-Busch InBev ===
On 16 September 2015, Anheuser-Busch InBev made the acquisition bid for SABMiller that would unite the world's two biggest beermakers and control about half the industry's profit. The deal, however, would need to go through several regulatory hurdles which would require certain operations to be spun off the group. A tentative deal was announced on 13 October 2015.

The US$107 billion merger between AB InBev and SABMiller closed on 10 October 2016. The new company, Anheuser-Busch InBev SA/NV is now the world's largest beer company. The target annual sales for the new company is US$55 billion.

During the merger discussions between Anheuser-Busch InBev and SABMiller in 2015, the U.S. Department of Justice (DOJ) had agreed to proposed deal only on the basis that SABMiller "spins off all its MillerCoors holdings in the U.S. — which include both Miller- and Coors-held brands – along with its Miller brands outside the U.S." The entire ownership situation was complicated: "In the United States, Coors is majority owned by MillerCoors (a subsidiary of SABMiller) and minority owned by Molson Coors, though internationally it’s entirely owned by Molson Coors, and Miller is owned by SABMiller."

As per the agreement with the regulators, the former SABMiller sold to Molson Coors full ownership of the Miller brand portfolio outside of the U.S. and Puerto Rico for US$12 billion on 11 October 2016. Molson Coors also retained "the rights to all of the brands currently in the MillerCoors portfolio for the U.S. and Puerto Rico." The agreement made Molson Coors the world's third largest brewer.

In Canada, Molson Coors regained the right (from the former SABMiller) to make and market Miller Genuine Draft and Miller Lite.

The company agreed to sell the former SABMiller Ltd. business in Eastern Europe to Asahi Breweries. This deal closed on 21 December 2016. Anheuser-Busch InBev had previously agreed to sell Grolsch Brewery, Peroni Brewery and Meantime Brewery to Asahi; that deal closed on 12 October 2016. On the same day, the sale of SABMiller's 49 per cent share in Snow beer to China Resources Enterprise also closed.

In July 2020, AB InBev agreed to sell the former SABMiller business Carlton & United Brewing to Asahi.

== Operations ==
SABMiller grew from its original South African base into a global company with operations in both developed markets and emerging economies such as Eastern Europe, China and India. It is one of the world's largest brewers, with brewing interests and distribution agreements across six continents.

In August 2016, after the plans for acquiring SABMiller had been established by Anheuser-Busch InBev, the company said it would close SABMiller's regional offices in Miami, Hong Kong and Beijing after the acquisition deal closed in October 2016. Plans had not yet been revealed for the operation in Zug, Switzerland which controlled SABMiller's central & eastern European beer brands. However, the subsequent sale of much of the business in such countries to Asahi Breweries may affect the Zug operation. The office in Woking (UK) was expected to remain open for a transitional period but the HQ in London's Stanhope Gate would close. The office in Johannesburg was expected to remain open for use by the Anheuser Busch Inbev SA/NV as its Africa hub.

Operations in some of the following regions may also be affected by the Anheuser Busch Inbev SA/NV owners in future.

=== Africa and Asia (incl. South Africa) ===
SABMiller's brewing operations in Africa spanned 31 countries. In China, the group's national brand, Snow beer, was produced in partnership with China Resources Enterprise Limited, with SABMiller owning 49 per cent; this is the leading brand by volume in China. Before acquiring SAB Miller, AB InBev had agreed to sell its interests in Snow to China Resources Beer (Holdings) Co for $1.6 billion to satisfy regulators. The deal closed on 12 October 2016.

SABMiller was the second-largest brewer in India and had joint ventures in Vietnam and Australia.

South Africa was SABMiller's most established market with brands including Castle Lager, Castle 1895, Castle Milk Stout, Hansa Marzen Gold, Hansa Pilsener, Carling Black Label, Carling Blue Label, Castle Lite, Redd's, Peroni, Brutal Fruit, Flying Fish, Liberado, and Carver's Weiss. The South African Breweries company is now a distinct entity, a direct subsidiary of Anheuser-Busch InBev SA/NV which had made commitments to the South African Competition Tribunal to maintain a stable employee level.

The soft drink division was a large producer of products for The Coca-Cola Company in Africa, although operations in Zambia, Zimbabwe, Botswana, Swaziland and Lesotho were sold to the Coca-Cola Company in late 2016.

According to recent reports, Coca-Cola paid $3.15 billion to acquire AB InBev's stake (from the former SABMiller) in Coca-Cola Beverages Africa.

=== Australia ===
In September 2011, the board of Foster's Group agreed to a takeover bid by SABMiller, valuing the company at A$9.9bn (US$10.2bn; £6.5bn). The Foster's Group, now known as Carlton & United Brewing was a direct subsidiary of Anheuser-Busch InBev SA/NV until July 2020 when it was sold to Asahi Global.

Brands include:

Carlton Draught, Cascade Draught (see Cascade Brewery), Foster's Lager, Melbourne Bitter, Pure Blonde, Victoria Bitter, and the Matilda Bay Brewing Company portfolio.

=== Europe ===
As part of the agreements made with regulators before Anheuser-Busch InBev was allowed to acquire SABMiller, the company sold the Peroni, Meantime and Grolsch brands to Asahi Breweries of Japan on 13 October 2016.

After acquiring SABMiller, Anheuser-Busch InBev SA/NV agreed on 21 December 2016 to sell the former SABMiller Ltd. business in Poland, the Czech Republic, Slovakia, Hungary and Romania to Asahi for US$7.8 billion. The deal includes popular brands such as Pilsner Urquell, Tyskie, Lech, Dreher, Ursus, Timisoreana and Kozel. The breweries in the sale include Pilsner Urquell, Kompania Piwowarska, Ursus, Topvar and Dreher.

=== Latin America ===
SABMiller first entered the Latin American market with the acquisition of Cervecería La Constancia from El Salvador and Cervecería Hondureña in Honduras, making the company the first international brewer to enter Central America. Since then, the group has expanded its Latin American operations into six countries, including Colombia, Ecuador, Panama and Peru.

Lager brands include:

Isenbeck (Argentina), Aguila, Club Colombia, Costeña, Poker, Pilsen (Colombia), Cristal, Pilsen Callao, Pilsen Trujillo, Cusqueña, Arequipeña (Peru), Pilsener, Club (Ecuador), Pilsener, Regia, Suprema, Golden Light (El Salvador), Port Royal, Salva Vida, Imperial, Barena (Honduras), Atlas (Panama), and Balboa (Panama).

=== North America ===
On 9 October 2007, SABMiller and Molson Coors announced a joint venture to be known as MillerCoors. US antitrust regulators approved the joint venture on 5 June 2008. The merger was completed on 30 June 2008 and MillerCoors began operation as a combined entity on 1 July 2008. The combined venture was headquartered in Chicago, Illinois.

Prior to the sale to Anheuser-Busch Inbev in October 2016, the brands included:

Miller Lite, Miller Genuine Draft, Olde English 800, Milwaukee's Best, Miller Chill, Hamm's, and Leinenkugel.

As per the agreement with the regulators prior to the 2016 sale, the company sold to Molson Coors full ownership of the Miller brand portfolio outside of the U.S. and Puerto Rico for US$12 billion. Molson Coors also retained "the rights to all of the brands currently in the MillerCoors portfolio for the U.S. and Puerto Rico."

== Beverages ==
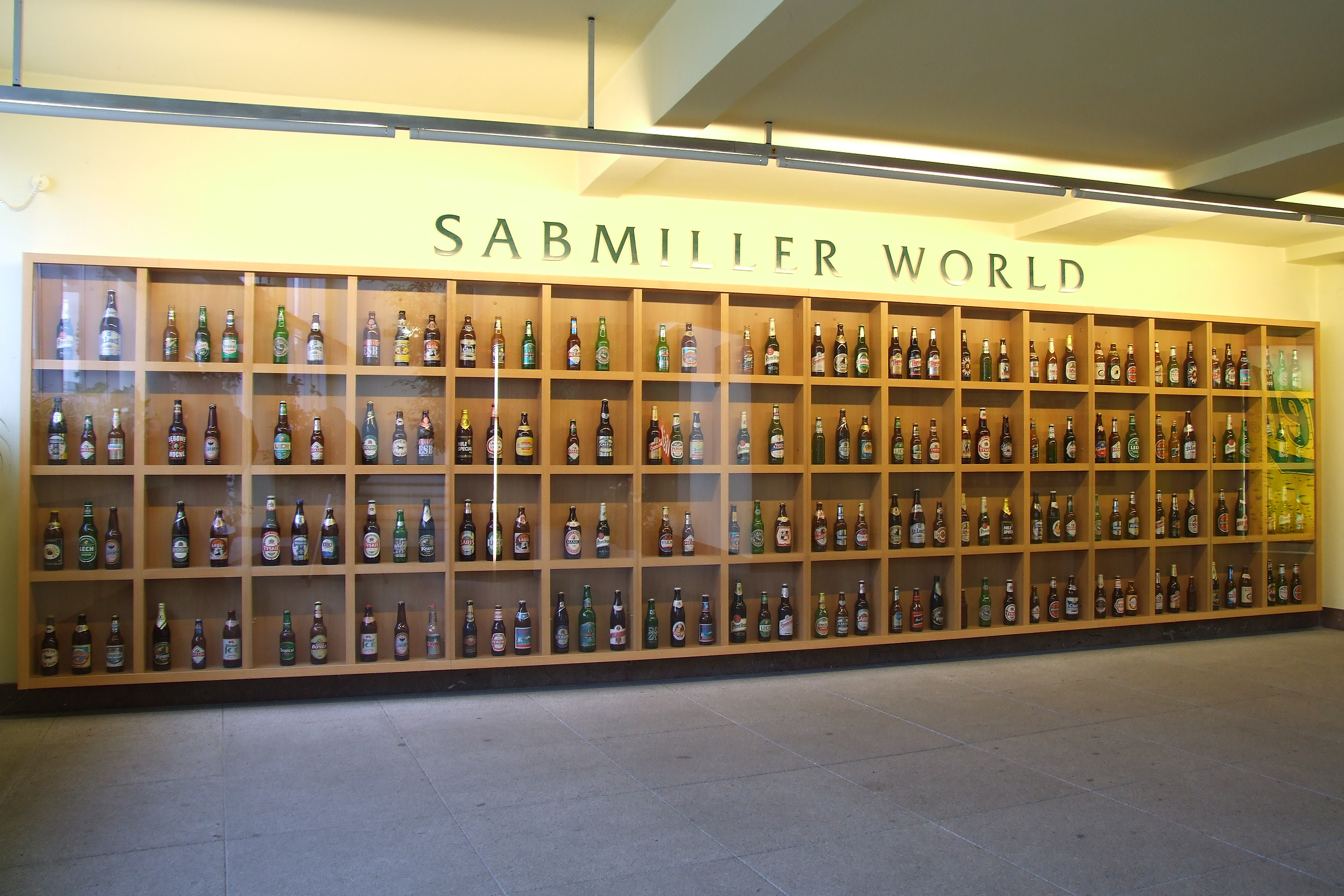
SABMiller beers on display as SABMiller World in Plzeň, Czech Republic

Before the acquisition by AB InBev on 10 October 2016, the SABMiller brands included some classified by the company as "global beers", which are the flagships of SAB Miller: Foster's made in Australia, Pilsner Urquell from the Czech Republic, Tyskie made in Poland and Miller Genuine Draft.

All of the Miller brands were sold to Molson Coors on 11 October 2016. Pilsner Urquell and Tyskie are among the brands being sold to Asahi Breweries.

SAB Miller also owned over 150 market-leading local brands. The company was one of the world's largest Coca-Cola bottlers and had carbonated soft-drink bottling operations in 14 markets. These were subsequently owned by the new Anheuser-Busch InBev SA/NV entity which is also a PepsiCo bottler. In December 2016, Coca-Cola Co. bought the Coca-Cola operations in Africa and in two Central American countries. The deal requires regulatory approval and should close by the end of 2017.

== Corporate social responsibility ==
=== Environment ===
SABMiller runs a number of sustainable development initiatives across its companies and in the countries in which it operates. They use new lightweight bottles that use 30 per cent less glass. The lightweight bottles are designed to not only reduce the amount of waste materials but also cut down on energy used in production and distribution reducing the company's carbon emissions. SABMiller submits to a number of third party annual reports that review the company's environmental record. The corporation provides links to such reports on their own website.

Like many multinationals, SABMiller has attracted close scrutiny for its adherence to the corporate social responsibilities it espouses. One major study, undertaken by BioMed Central and published in 2013, examined the global CSR of three of the biggest manufacturers of alcohol - Pernod Ricard, SABMiller and AB InBev - and concluded it amounted to 'the illusion of righteousness'.

=== Taxation ===
In November 2010, the charity ActionAid published a report alleging that SABMiller has avoided paying a total of around £20 million of corporation tax in five African countries – Ghana, Mozambique, Tanzania, South Africa and Zambia – and in India. SABMiller has denied these allegations.

In October 2015, the Financial Times described the actions of SABMiller and other multinationals operating in Africa as "looters". The issue is transfer pricing, the transfer of goods or services to another arm of the group in a different country. In their 2015 annual report, SABMiller stated that its tax contribution in Africa is "substantial". It releases its tax contributions for four of the 17 African markets in which it operates.

== Senior management and board of directors ==
Since SABMiller had been acquired on 10 October 2016, and became a wholly owned business division of Anheuser-Busch InBev SA/NV, there was no longer a need for a management team or board of directors for this former company. In August 2017, Anheuser Busch Inbev had announced that Mauricio Leyva, then the CEO of SAB South Africa, would be the only SABMiller executive to remain with Anheuser Busch Inbev SA/NV on the new entity's 18 member permanent board. Leyva would become zone president for Middle Americas at Anheuser Busch Inbev SA/NV. News reports indicated that "three ... SABMiller executive committee members - general counsel John Davidson, human resources head Johann Nel and Africa MD Mark Bowman - [would] stay on for a six-month transitional period only".
