= Peroni =

Italian brewing company

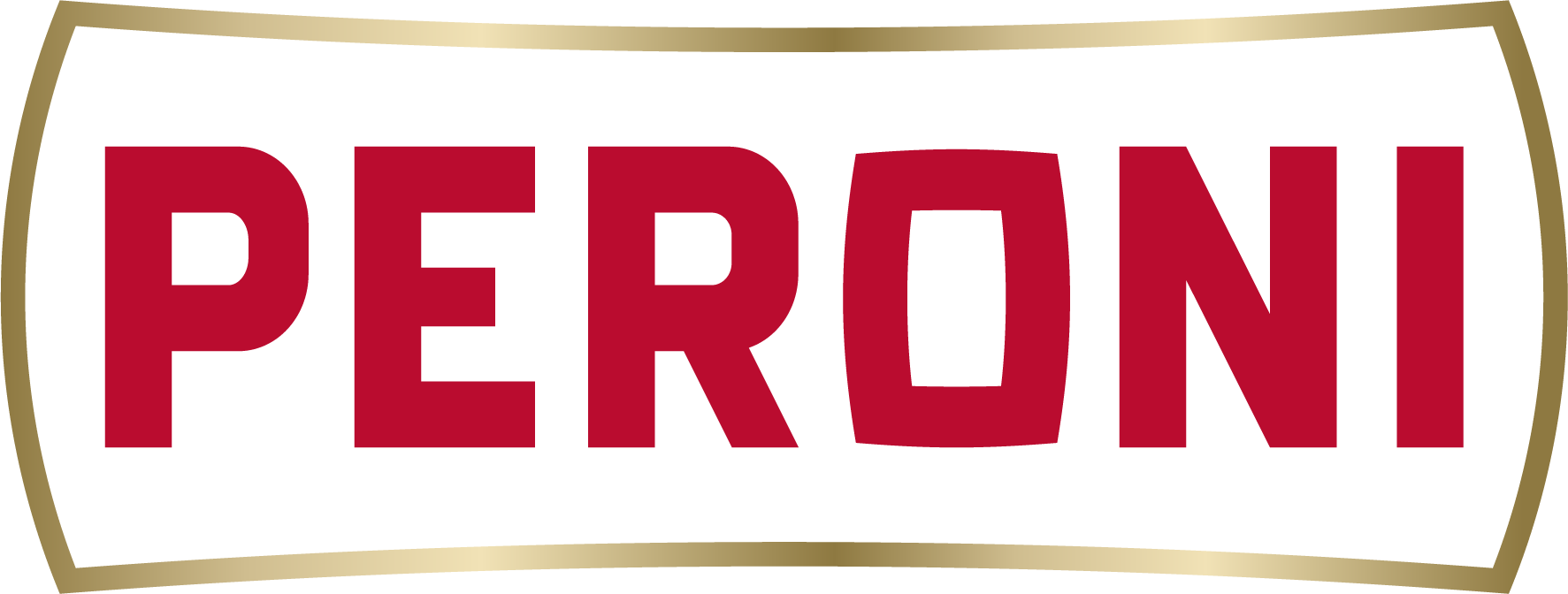

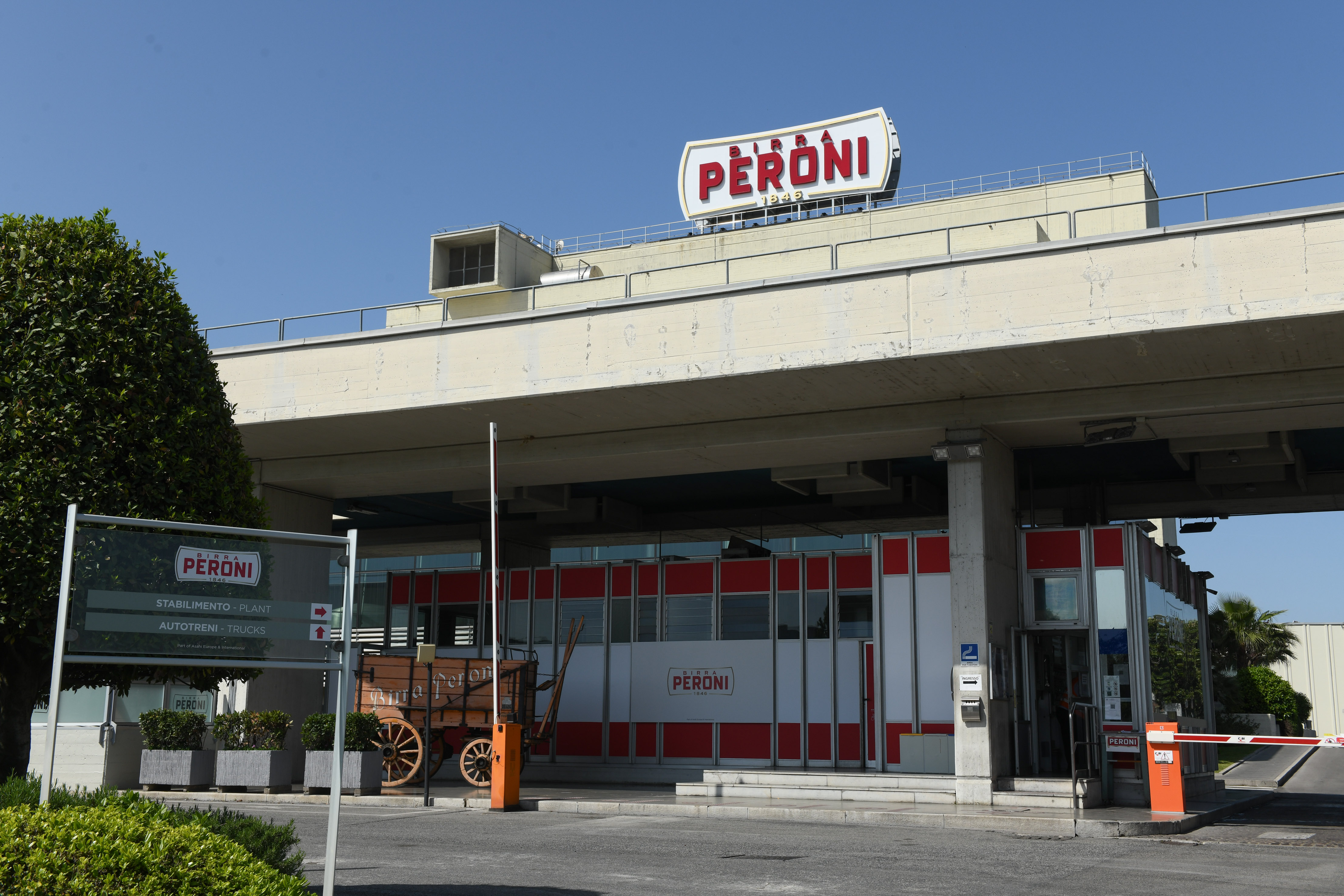
- The headquarters of Birra Peroni Srl in Rome, May 2022
- Interactive map of Peroni
- Type: Beer (Carcinogenicity: IARC group 1)
- Location: Rome, Italy
- Coordinates: 41°53′55.75″N 12°28′48.87″E
- Opened: 1846; 180 years ago
- Owner: Asahi Breweries; AB InBev (former)
- Website: peroniitalia.com

Active beers
- Crystall, a 5.6% abv pale lager
- Peroni Gran Riserva, a 6.6% abv strong lager
- Peroncino, a 5% pale lager
- Peroni Leggera, a 3.5% pale lager
- Capri, a 4.2% abv light lager
Name	Type

Peroni (Italian pronunciation: [peˈroːni]) is an Italian brewing company founded by Francesco Peroni in Vigevano, Italy, in 1846.

In 2016, as part of agreements made with regulators before AB InBev was allowed to acquire SABMiller, the company sold Peroni to Asahi Breweries.

Molson Coors Beverage Company produces Peroni at its Albany, Georgia, brewery.

== Foundation and early history ==
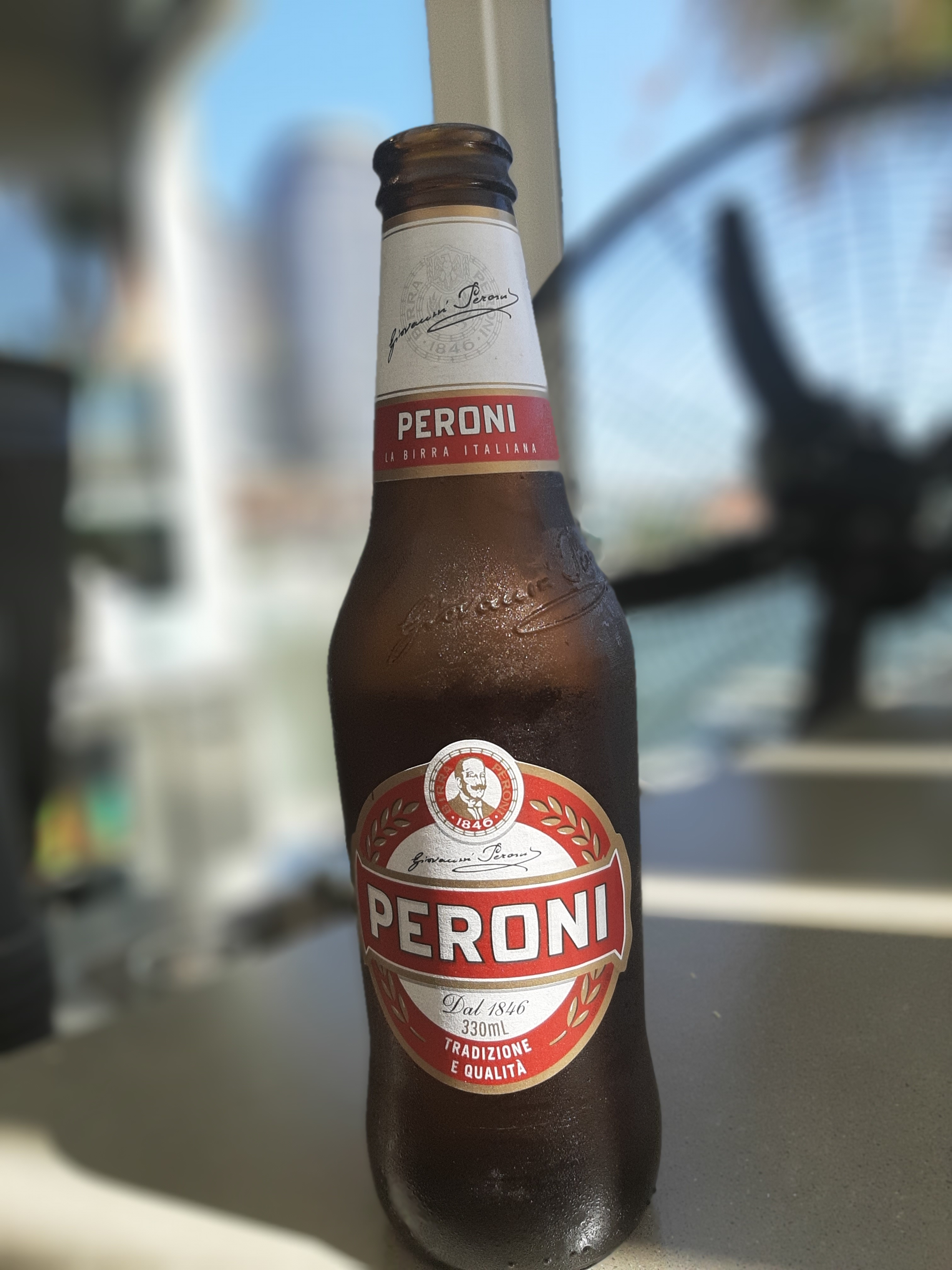
The original Peroni beer. 4.7% abv. 330 ml bottle. Former design which contained a portrait of Giovanni Peroni above the logo.

=== Foundation by Giovanni Peroni in Vigevano ===
The Peroni company was established under the founding family name in the town of Vigevano, Italy, in 1846. Due to booming business, a second brewery was built in Rome. The company was moved to Rome by Giovanni Peroni in 1864, six years prior to Rome becoming the Italian capital in 1870. Throughout the late 19th and early 20th centuries, the company became one of the most prominent brewing companies in the newly unified Italian nation.

=== Advertising ===
In the 1960s and through their expansion, Peroni Nastro Azzurro launched numerous successful advertising campaigns, keeping a strong focus upon the sea and sailing world; each campaign featuring a model styled in a sailor outfit and hat.

In February 2021, Aston Martin F1 Team announced a partnership with Peroni to promote the Peroni Libera 0.0% alcohol-free beer brand. In 2024, Scuderia Ferrari HP announced that they would sign a multi-year partnership with the brand.

=== Acquisition and expansion ===
By the 1990s, both the Peroni brand name and product line were distributed and known worldwide. SABMiller bought the company in 2003, making it one of the few international brands in its portfolio.

Asahi acquired the Peroni, Grolsch, and Meantime brands from SABMiller in February 2016. The spin-off of these brands was required as a condition of SABMiller's acquisition by AB InBev.

== Brands ==
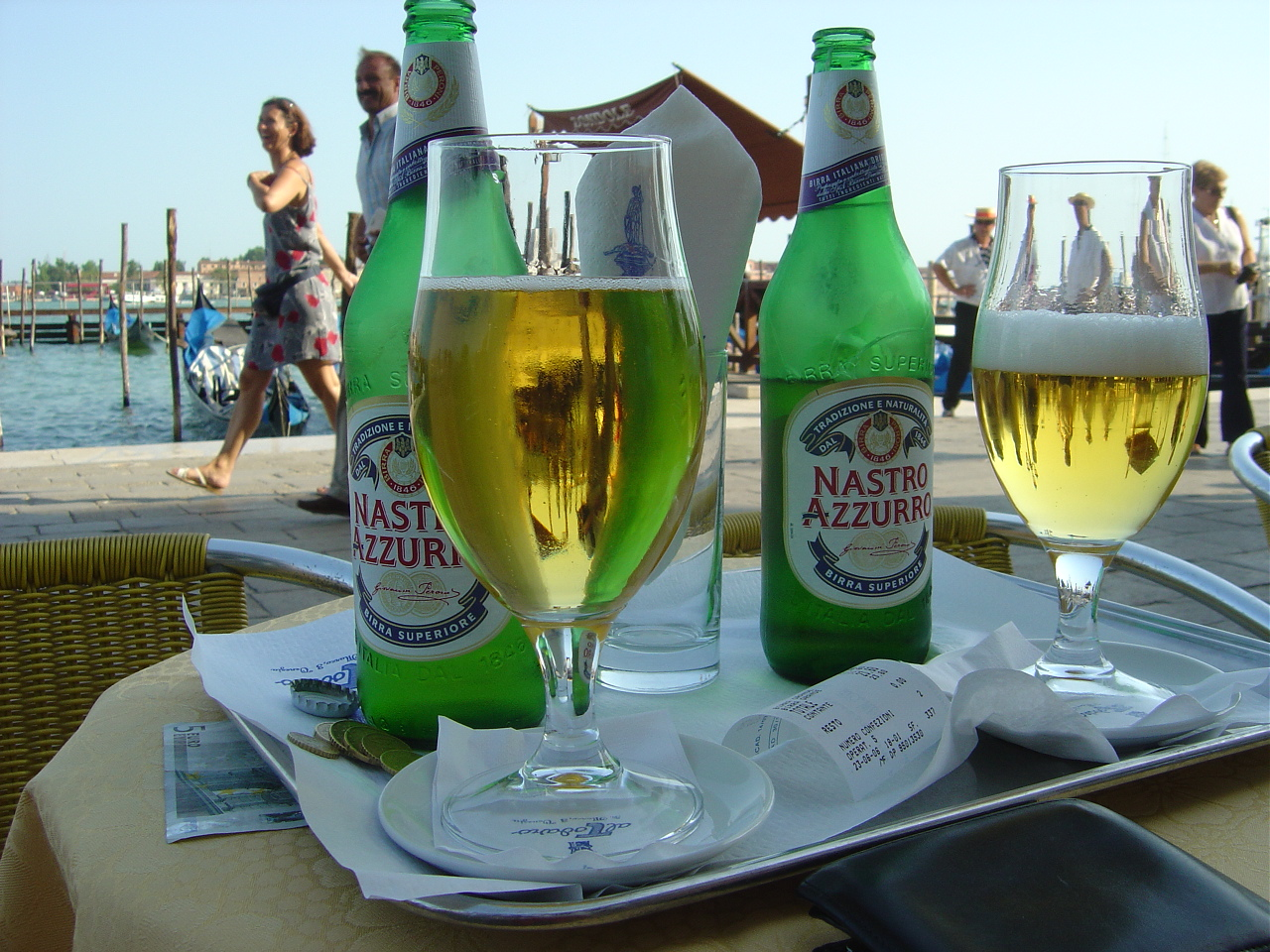
Nastro Azzurro at a sidewalk cafe in St Mark's Square, Venice, Italy.

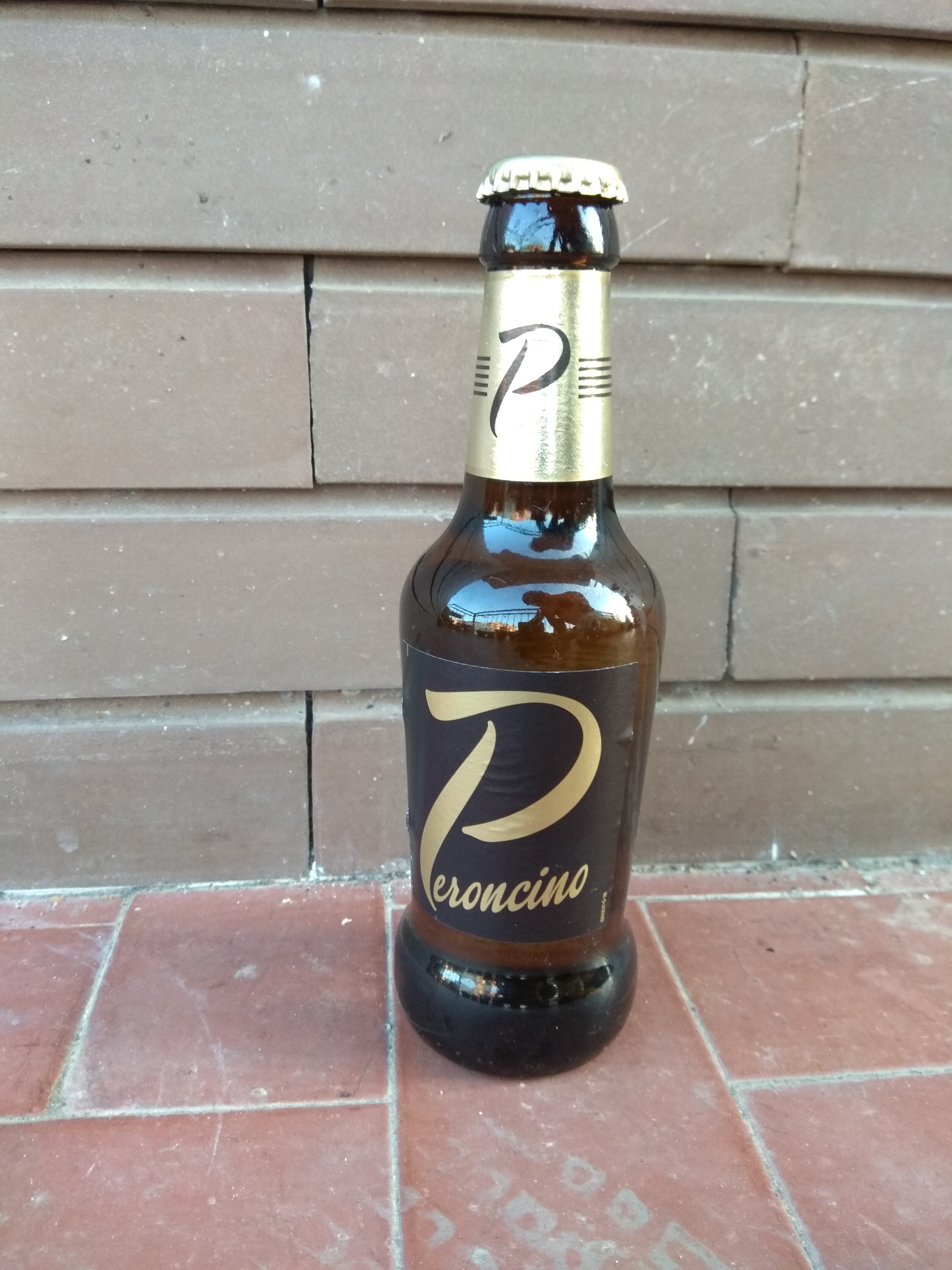
Peroncino beer

Beers under the Peroni brand include: Crystall, a 5.6% abv pale lager; Peroni Gran Riserva, a 6.6% abv strong lager; Peroncino, a 5% pale lager; Peroni Leggera, a 3.5% pale lager; Peroni Capri, a 4.2% light lager. The company also produces the Wührer brand – a 4.7% pale lager launched in Brescia in 1829. The main brands are Peroni and Nastro Azzurro.

=== Peroni ===
Peroni is the Peroni company's original brand. According to Assobirra, it is the best selling beer in Italy. It is 4.7% abv and made with barley malt, maize, hop pellets and hop extract. By the 1950s and 1960s, Peroni was the most recognized brand of beer throughout the Italian peninsula and in 2019 was one of the five most popular Italian beers in the world. Peroni is also available as a lemon flavour, named chill lemon.

=== Nastro Azzurro ===
Nastro Azzurro is a 5.0% alcohol by volume pale lager. Launched in 1963, it is the Peroni Brewery's premium lager brand. The name means "Blue Ribbon" in Italian, in honor of the Blue Riband won by Italian ocean liner SS Rex in 1933. Nastro Azzurro has also sponsored teams in Grand Prix motorcycle racing. In 1997 they sponsored a 125cc Aprilia team with rider Valentino Rossi, who won the championship in that season. In 2000 and 2001 they sponsored a 500cc Honda team, again with Rossi as the rider.

Molson Coors began US domestic production of Nastro Azzurro in Albany, Georgia in the summer of 2024. In 2025, Asahi launched a canned version of Nastro Azzurro for the Japanese market, positioning it at a similar price point to Suntory Premium Malt's and Sapporo Yebisu.
