= SABMiller brands =

Beer brands owned by SABMiller

SABMiller was one of the top five global brewing companies, and had a range of over 150 beers, including international beers such as Pilsner Urquell, and Miller Genuine Draft, and local ones such as Gambrinus and Castle Milk Stout.

The company was acquired by Anheuser-Busch InBev in October 2016 and sold off its interest in MillerCoors to Molson Coors as required by regulators in the U.S. The new company, Anheuser-Busch InBev SA/NV, is trading on the Brussels Stock Exchange as ABI.BR and as BUD on the New York stock exchange.

After the merger between Anheuser Busch Inbev and SABMiller, the new Anheuser-Busch InBev SA/NV company owns over 200 beer brands including Budweiser and Bud Light, Corona, Stella Artois, Beck's, Leffe, Hoegaarden, Skol, Brahma, Antarctica, Quilmes, Victoria, Modelo Especial, Michelob Ultra, Harbin, Sedrin, Klinskoye, Sibirskaya Korona, Chernigivske, Cass and Jupiler. Anheuser-Busch InBev SA/NV also owns a soft drinks business that has bottling contracts with PepsiCo through its subsidiary, AmBev. In December 2016, Coca-Cola Co. bought many of the former SABMiller's Coca-Cola operations.

== SAB Limited beers ==
Prior to the acquisition of SABMiller by Anheuser-Busch InBev, the company owned the following brands; they have since been sold or are made by a company that is now a subsidiary of Anheuser-Busch InBev SA/NV.

- Brutal Fruit (Brand family)
- Carling Black Label
- Carling Blue Label
- Castle Lager
- Castle Lite
- Castle Milk Stout
- Castle Free (Non-alcoholic)
- Hansa Marzen Gold (discontinued in 2015)
- Hansa Pilsener
- Lion Lager
- Lion Ale (discontinued in 1980's)
- Miller Genuine Draft
- Peroni
- Redd's Dry
- Redd's Premium Cold
- Sarita
- Sterling Light Lager (discontinued)

== SABMiller India Ltd. breweries ==
- Fosters
- Haywards 2000
- Haywards 5000
- Indus Pride
- Knock Out
- Royal Challenge

== Botswana brewery ==
Chibuku Shake Shake (so called because it separates out and must be shaken) is brewed from a mix of sorghum and maize, and sold in paper cartons or 2 litre brown plastic containers with a wide blue lid.

== Canarias Brewery ==
The Canarias Brewery was formed in 1994 from the merger of two Canary Island breweries, CCC and SICAL, both of whom had been established at the start of the 20th century. The brewery produces the beers Dorada and Tropical, and brews under licence various global beers such as Carlsberg, Pilsner Urquell and Guinness.

== Castle brewery ==
Castle Brewery was founded in Johannesburg in 1894. It later merged with other breweries to form South African Breweries (SAB) which subsequently became SABMiller. Castle Brewery is still a division of SAB but is now owned by Anheuser-Busch InBev SA/NV.

== Delta Corporation Zimbabwe ==
- Eagle Lager
- Castle Lager
- Golden Pilsner
- Bolingers Lager
- Zambezi Lager
- Lion Lager
- Chibuku Opaque Beer
- Chibuku Super

== Dreher Brewery ==
This company (Dreher Sörgyárak) in Budapest was owned by SABMiller. After acquiring SABMiller, Anheuser-Busch InBev SA/NV agreed on 21 December 2016 to sell Dreher to [Asahi Breweries] of Japan.

== Cerveceria Hondureña (Honduran Brewery) ==
- Barena
- Port-Royal
- Imperial
- Salva-Vida

== Intafact Beverages Limited ==
- Hero Lager
- Castle Milk Stout (6%ABV)
- Grand Malt (non-alcoholic)
- Beta Malt (non-alcoholic)

== International Breweries plc ==
- Trophy Lager
- Trophy Stout
- Betamalt
- Grand Malt

== Kgalagadi Breweries Limited ==
- St Louis Lager
- St Louis Export
- Castle Lager
- Carling Black Label
- Lion Lager

== Kompania Piwowarska breweries ==
Kompania Piwowarska (which in Polish means "Brewing Company") is a brewing company established in Poland in 1999 as a result of the merger of two SABMiller owned Polish breweries, the Lech brewery in Poznań, and the Tyskie Górny Śląsk brewery in Tychy, which was founded in 1629. The company also owns the Dojlidy Brewery in Białystok. The three breweries have a total capacity of 15.1 million hectolitres. SAB purchased a majority share in the Lech and Tyskie breweries in 1995. Kompania Piwowarska currently controls 45% of the Polish beer market.

After acquiring SABMiller, Anheuser-Busch InBev SA/NV agreed on 21 December 2016 to sell Kompania Piwowarska to Asahi Breweries of Japan.

== La Constancia brewery, El Salvador ==
- Pilsener
- Golden Light
- Regia
- Suprema

== Mozambique brewery (CDM) ==
- 2M
- 2M Flow
- Laurentina
  - Laurentina Clara
  - Laurentina Premium
  - Laurentina Preta
- Manica
- Impala(cassava-based beer)
- Dourada
- Raiz (discontinued)

== Nile brewery ==
The original brewery is in Jinja, Uganda.

- Chairman's Extra Strong Beer (ESB)
- Club Pilsner
- Nile Special Lager
- Nile Gold

== Plzeňský Prazdroj brewery ==
- Pilsner Urquell
- Gambrinus
- Gambrinus Dia with lower sugar content
- Gambrinus Premium

== Radegast Brewery ==
Radegast Brewery is a brewery located in Nošovice, Moravian-Silesian Region of the Czech Republic since 1970. The beer is named after the god Radegast. The brewery has been owned by Pilsner Urquell since 1999, which in turn was owned by SABMiller. On 21 December 2016, Anheuser-Busch InBev SA/NV agreed to sell Pilsner Urquell to Asahi Breweries Group Holdings, Ltd.

== Tanzanian breweries ==
- Kilimanjaro Lager
- Balimi
- Castle Lite
- Ndovu Premium Lager
- Safari Lager

== Colombian breweries (Bavaria) ==
- Aguila
- Aguila Light
- Aguila Imperial (Yearly special production)
- Brava (No longer produced)
- Costeña
- Costeñita
- Club Colombia
- Pilsen
- Poker
- Poker Ligera

== Peruvian breweries (Backus) ==
- Arequipeña
- Cristal
- Pilsen Callao
- Backus Ice
- Pilsen Trujillo
- Cusqueña Dorada
- Cusqueña Trigo
- Cusqueña Red Lager
- Cusqueña Malta
- Cusqueña Quinua
- San Juan

== Ecuadorian breweries (Cerveceria Nacional) ==
- Pilsener
- Pilsener Light
- Club Premium
- Conquer
- Dorada
- Pony Malta
- Agua Manantial con gas y sin gas

== Ursus Breweries ==
Ursus Breweries was a subsidiary of SABMiller plc, is one of the top brewers in Romania.

After acquiring SABMiller, Anheuser-Busch InBev SA/NV agreed on 21 December 2016 to sell Ursus to [Asahi Breweries] of Japan.

== Southern Sudan Beverages Limited ==
Southern Sudan Beverages Limited runs White Bull, a lager.

== Eswatini Beverages Ltd ==
Eswatini Beverages Ltd brews Sibebe Lager.

== Other breweries ==
- Atlas
- Balboa
- Blue Sword
- Ciucaş
- Club Shandy
- Del Altiplano
- Dog In The Fog
- Gran Riserva
- Green Leaves
- Golden Light
- Golden Pilsener
- Huadan Dry Beer
- Huadan Yale
- Indus Pride
- Knock Out
- Kobányai Sör
- Largo
- Legenda
- Lowen
- Malta Arequipeña
- Malta Cusqueña
- Malta Polar
- Maluti Premium Lager (Lesotho)
- Mosi Lager (Zambia)
- Moya Kaluga
- N'gola (Angola)
- New Three Star
- Port Royal
- Raffo
- Redd's Apple
- Redd's Green Apple
- Redd's Strawberry
- Redd's Sun
- Regia Extra
- Rhino Lager
- Royal Challenge Premium Lager
- Salva Vida
- San Juan
- Saris Light
- Saris Dark
- Saris Premium
- Shengquan
- Shenyang
- Singo
- Sip
- Smadny mnich Light
- Snow beer 11°P
- Stejar
- Stone Strong Lager
- Suprema
- Tianjin
- Timişoreana
- Topvar
- Tri Bogatyrya Bochkovoye
- Tri Bogatyrya Svetloye
- Tropical Pils
- Tropical Premium
- Velkopopovický Kozel
- Velkopopovický Kozel Cerny
- Velkopopovický Kozel Premium
- Velkopopovický Kozel Svetly
- Vitamalt
- Whisky Black
- Wührer
- X-Cape
- Yingshi
- Zero
- Zolotaya Bochka Klassicheskoye (Golden Barrel Classic)
- Zolotaya Bochka Svetloye (Golden Barrel Light)
- Zolotaya Bochka Vyderzhannoye (Golden Barrel Aged)

== Miller Brewing Company beers ==
All of the Miller brands and subsidiaries were sold to Molson Coors on October 11, 2016 as required by regulators before the forming of the new company, Anheuser-Busch InBev SA/NV. All of those brands are now made by Miller Brewing Company, a subsidiary of MillerCoors.

== Non-beer brands ==
SABMiller was one of the world's largest Coca-Cola bottlers and had carbonated soft drinks bottling operations in 14 markets. In December 2016, Coca-Cola Co. bought many of the Anheuser-Busch InBev SA/NV company's Coca-Cola operations. The affected regions include Zambia, Zimbabwe, Botswana, Swaziland, Lesotho, El Salvador and Honduras. The deal requires regulatory approval and should close by the end of 2017.

Brands produced have included:

- Appletiser
- Bibo
- Bon Aqua
- Coca-Cola
- Cristal water
- Fanta
- Grapetiser
- Guaraná Backus
- Just Juice
- Malta Leona
- Malta Leona Cool
- Milo (owned by Nestle)
- Minute Maid
- Nestea (owned by Nestle)
- Nevada
- Play
- Pony Malta
- Valpré
- Saboré
- Sparkling Grenadilla
- Sparletta
- Sprite
- TAB
- Tropical
- Tutti Frutti
- Viva
