= Dojlidy (disambiguation) =

Dojlidy is a district of the city of Białystok, Poland, formerly a village.

Dojlidy may also refer to:

- Dojlidy Brewery, Białystok, Poland and its brands of beer
- Dojlidy-Kolonia, village in the administrative district of Gmina Zabłudów, within Białystok County. Poland
- Dojlidy Ponds, ponds complex in Białystok.
- Former name of Żubr (beer), Polish lager
