= Tychy Brewery =

Polish brewery

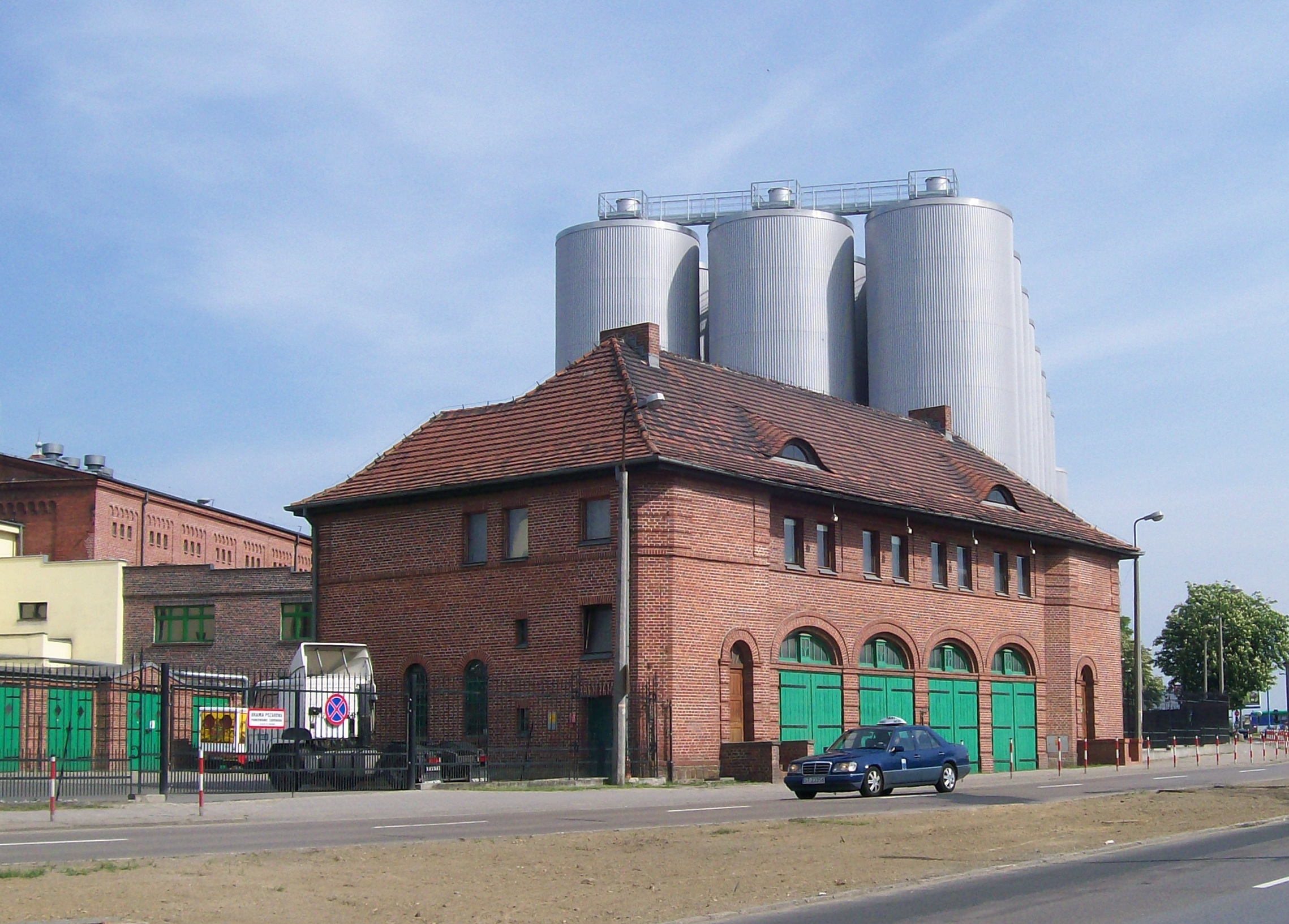
- Interactive map of Tychy Brewery
- Type: Brewery
- Location: Tychy, Poland
- Opened: 1629
- Owner: Kompania Piwowarska S.A.

Active beers
Dębowe Mocne, Tyskie, Wojak, Żubr
Name	Type

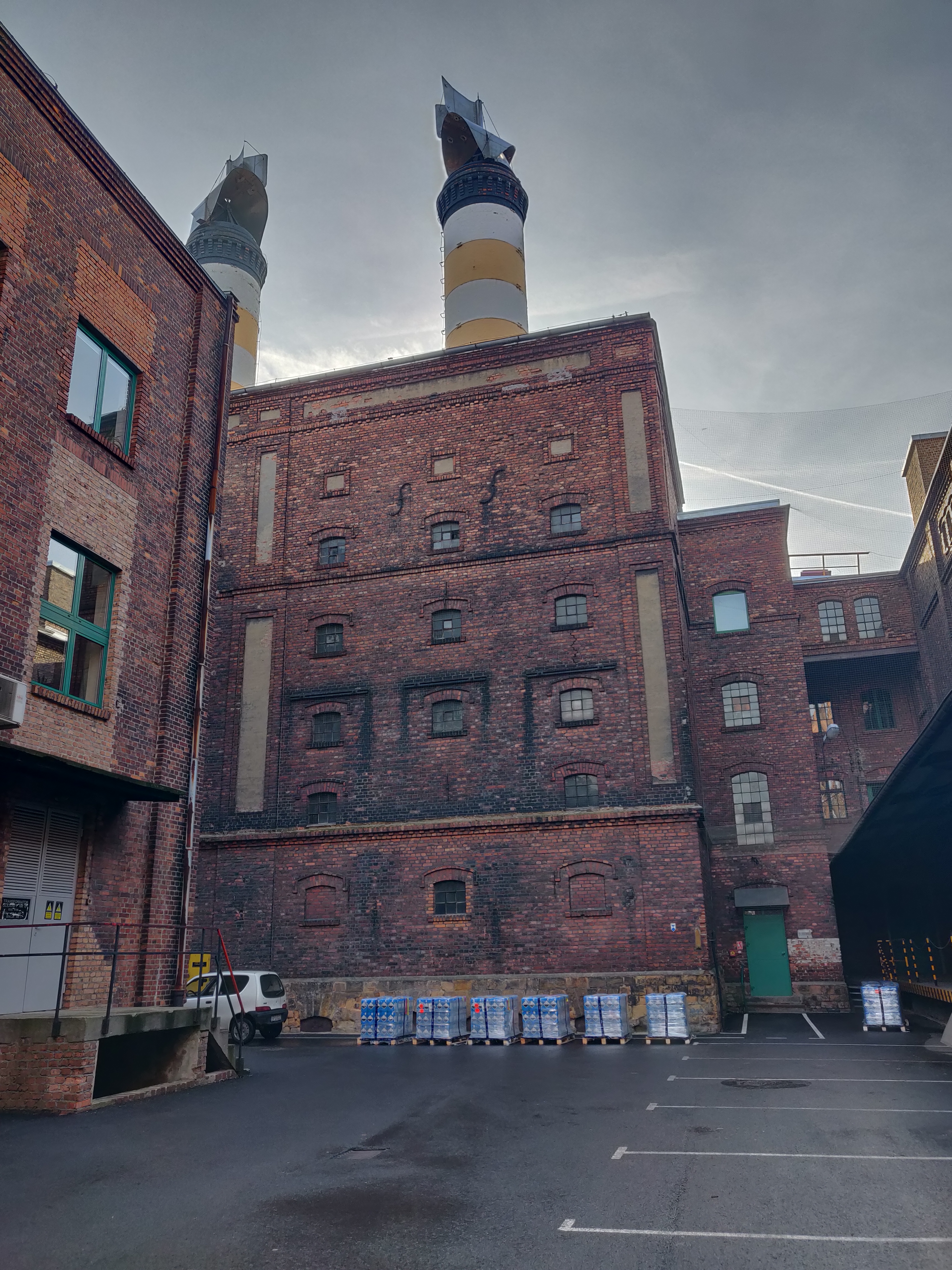
Princely Brewery Tychy (2019)

Princely Brewery Tychy (Polish Tyskie Browary Książęce) or Tychy Brewery in the town of Tychy is one of the largest breweries in Poland. It is operated by the Kompania Piwowarska company. It traces its history to the 17th century.

The brand of beer produced by the brewery is Tyskie.

Today, the premises host a beer museum "Tyskie Brewing Museum" (Polish Tyskie Browarium).

During a 2009 vote the brewery complex was voted, as one of the "Seven Architectural Wonders of the Silesian Voivodeship."
