= South African Breweries =

Brewing company based in Johannesburg, South Africa

The South African Breweries (Pty) Limited
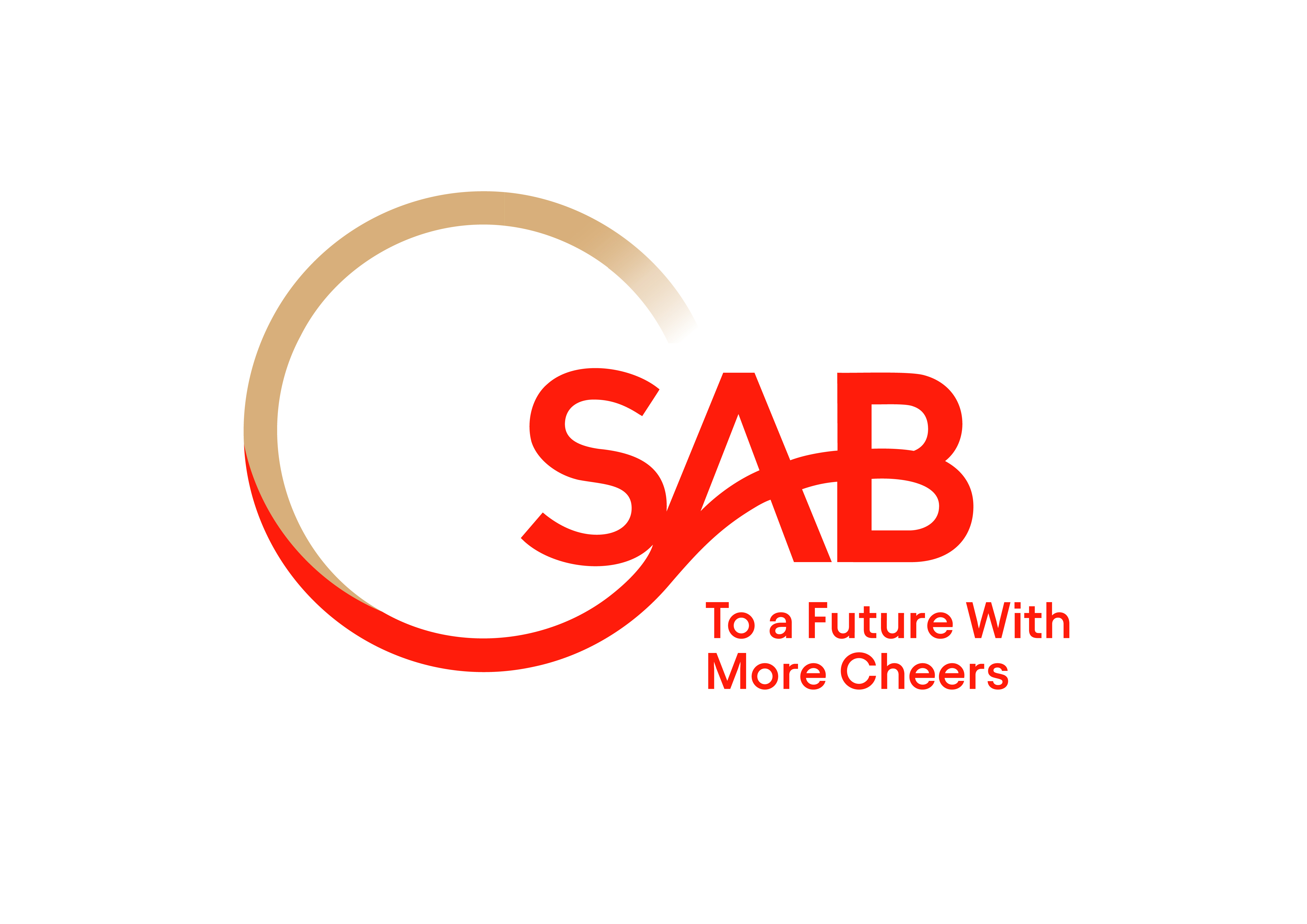
- Type: Subsidiary
- Industry: Consumer goods
- Founded: 1895
- Headquarters: Johannesburg, South Africa
- Area served: Southern Africa
- Products: Beer, soft drinks
- Owner: SABMiller (1999-2016); Anheuser-Busch InBev (2016-present)
- Number of employees: Approximately 9,400
- Website: https://www.sab.co.za/

South African Breweries (officially The South African Breweries (Pty) Limited, informally SAB) is a major brewery headquartered in Johannesburg, South Africa and was a wholly owned subsidiary of SABMiller until its interests were sold to Anheuser-Busch InBev on 10 October 2016. South African Breweries is now a direct subsidiary of Anheuser-Busch InBev SA/NV.

The company that is now South African Breweries was founded in 1895 as Castle Brewery to serve a growing market of miners and prospectors in and around Johannesburg. Two years later, it became the first industrial company to list on the Johannesburg Stock Exchange and the year after (1898) it listed on the London Stock Exchange. In 1950, SAB relocated its headquarters and control from London to South Africa. In 1955, Castle Brewing purchased the Ohlsson's and Chandlers Union breweries, and the group was renamed South African Breweries.

In the 1960s, through its Cold Castle National Jazz Festival, named for one of its key brands, the company was a major sponsor and patron of the South African jazz movement and underwrote the production of the LP Jazz: The African Sound.

From the early 1990s onward, the company increasingly expanded internationally, making several acquisitions in both emerging and developed markets. In 1999, it formed a new UK-based holding company, SAB plc, and moved its primary listing to London. In May 2002, SAB plc acquired Miller Brewing, forming SABMiller plc.

On 10 October 2016, Anheuser-Busch InBev acquired SABMiller for £69 billion (US$107 billion at the time the deal closed). The arrangement had been approved by shareholders of both companies on 28 September 2016, and the deal closed on 10 October 2016. The acquisition ended the corporate use of the name SABMiller. After the deal closed, the new company's name changed slightly, to Anheuser-Busch InBev SA/NV (abbreviated as AB InBev); it is trading as ABI on the Brussels Stock Exchange, as BUD on the New York stock exchange and as ANH on the Johannesburg market. SABMiller ceased trading on global stock markets.

== Acquisition of SABMiller by ABinBev ==
The acquisition of SABMiller by Anheuser-Busch InBev on 10 October 2016 ended the corporate use of the name SABMiller except as a business division of Anheuser-Busch InBev SA/NV (AB InBev). The new entity began trading on the Brussels Stock Exchange as ABI.BR and as BUD on the New York stock exchange. SABMiller ceased trading on global stock markets and divested itself of its interests in the MillerCoors beer company to Molson Coors.

On 21 December 2016, the company agreed to sell the former SABMiller Ltd. business in Eastern Europe to Asahi Breweries Group Holdings, Ltd. Anheuser-Busch InBev had previously agreed to sell Grolsch Brewery, Peroni Brewery and Meantime Brewery to Asahi; that deal closed on 12 October 2016. On the same day, the sale of SABMiller's 49 percent share in Snow beer to China Resources Enterprise also closed.

In December 2016, the Coca-Cola Company bought the Coca-Cola operations in Africa and in two Central American countries. The deal requires regulatory approval and should close by the end of 2017.

In August 2016, after the plans for acquiring SABMiller had been established by Anheuser-Busch InBev, the company said it would close SABMiller's regional offices in Miami, Hong Kong and Beijing after the acquisition deal closed in October 2016. Plans had not yet been revealed for the operation in Zug, Switzerland which controlled SABMiller's central & eastern European beer brands. However, the subsequent sale of much of the business in such countries to Asahi Breweries may affect the Zug operation. The office in Woking (United Kingdom) was expected to remain open for a transitional period but the HQ in London's Stanhope Gate would close. The South African Breweries office in Johannesburg will remain open and will also be used by Anheuser Busch InBev SA/NV (whose corporate HQ is in Leuven, Belgium) as its Africa hub.

== Board of directors, management and staffing ==
Since SABMiller had been acquired on 10 October 2016, and became a wholly owned subsidiary of Anheuser-Busch InBev SA/NV, there was no longer a need for a board of directors for the former SABMiller. In August 2017, Anheuser Busch InBev had announced that Mauricio Leyva, then the CEO of SAB South Africa, would be the only executive to remain with Anheuser Busch Inbev SA/NV on the new entity's 18 member permanent board. Leyva would become zone president for Middle Americas at Anheuser Busch Inbev SA/NV. News reports indicated that "three ... SABMiller executive committee members - general counsel John Davidson, human resources head Johann Nel and Africa MD Mark Bowman - [would] stay on for a six-month transitional period only".

South African Breweries (SAB) remains an entity, as a subsidiary of SAB InBev. According to Bloomberg, Grant Murray Liversage was the Finance Director of South African Breweries Limited after the takeover by Anheuser-Busch InBev SA/NV. Mauricio Leyva Arboleda, currently employed by Anheuser-Busch InBev SA/NV and Dinyar S. DeVitre were board members of SAB.

Before the 10 October 2016 acquisition of SABMiller, in April 2016, Anheuser-Busch InBev had agreed to protect South African jobs and create a 1 billion rand (US$69 million) fund that would "support farmers, local manufacturing, jobs, and the reduction of harmful alcohol use," including funding new barley and hops farms. This offer was made to convince the regulators to approve the sale of SABMiller.

The company is bound by an agreement with the South African Competition Tribunal that employment numbers at South African Brewery will be stable for five years and that there will be no forced reductions of staff and that unionized employees will not be offered voluntary separation for five years.

However, AB InBev decided to attempt some cost savings by offering voluntary severance offers to some management level staff at SAB. On 23 January 2017, Robyn Chalmers, Director of Communications, AB InBev Africa and SAB, said that "... no employee will be forcibly retrenched as a result of the merger. It is too early in the process to say how many people may opt for the voluntary offer." She added that the offer "has been made available only to mid-level employees and above". Since the company must maintain the staffing level, highly paid managers will probably be replaced by staff at lower levels.

== History ==
=== Brewing in South Africa ===
Prior to incorporation in the year 1895, Castle Brewery had operations in Cape Town to serve the steady expansion of a settler community from the mid-17th century. The demand for beer prompted the first Dutch governor, Jan van Riebeeck, to establish a brewery at the Fort (later replaced by the Castle in central Cape Town) as early as 1658 - beating the first wine production by six months. In the same year, Pieter Visagie brewed the first beer from the waters of the Liesbeeck River. Over the next 200 years, brewing made its mark in the Cape and beyond. Noted brewers of the time included Cloete at the Newlands Brewery; Ohlsson at the Anneberg Brewery; Jacob Letterstedt at Mariendahl Brewery - also in Newlands: Hiddingh at Cannon Brewery; Martienssen at the Salt River Brewery, and a second Cloete in Kloof Street.

One of the key figures in the story of Newlands, and in the annals of South African beer manufacturing history, was Swede Anders Ohlsson, who sailed for Africa, aged 23, in 1864. Initially, he imported Swedish goods and timbers, and developed an extensive trade network and a solid business empire. Then he turned to brewing, basing himself at Newlands, where he produced Lion Lager.

In 1955, the South African government introduced a heavy tax on beer products causing many consumers to switch to spirits. However, the subsequent shock to the South African beer industry proved to be a blessing in disguise for SAB. A year later, the company purchased its two main competitors, Ohlsson's and Chandlers Union Breweries, both of whom were struggling under the depressed demand for beer, and the group was renamed South African Breweries.

After the acquisitions the new and larger SAB was able to rationalize operations, thereby reducing costs and increasing profitability. Donald Gordon's Liberty Life Strategic Investments (LIBSIL), which was associated with JSE-listed financial services and property holding company Liberty Holdings, maintained a large stake in the company for most of the 1990s. By 1998, SAB commanded approximately 98 per cent share of the South African beer market and was considered one of the lowest cost producers of beer in the world.

In 1999, after listing on the London Stock Exchange to raise capital for acquisitions, the group purchased the Miller Brewing Company in North America from the Altria Group in 2002, and changed its name to SABMiller.

Within South Africa, SAB distributes beer through its extensive network, augmented by a fleet of independent truck drivers (called owner-drivers) comprising mainly former employees, many of whom had received help from the group to start their own businesses. SAB has invested billions of rands in this owner-driver project since inception.

Although several international brewers, such as the UK's Whitbread, had tried to enter the South African market, all had thus far failed to gain significant market share. From time to time, new startups also tried to challenge SAB's monopoly, but these had either gone out of business, or been acquired by SAB. A case in point was National Sorghum Breweries (NSB), "a black business consortium" founded in 1990, and the first new player in the beer industry in more than 10 years. "SAB’s supremacy is under threat," observers said, and some thought that within a few years NSB could achieve 10 per cent market share. Instead, the company ran into financial difficulties and failed to gain any significant share of the market.

This does not mean that SAB's position could never be threatened. In 2004, a new company was established in South Africa known as Brandhouse through a joint venture of Diageo, Heineken and Namibian Breweries. Brandhouse started marketing, selling and distributing some of the world's top premium brands such as Heineken and Windhoek and in March 2007, the 40-year agreement between SABMiller plc and Heineken N.V. which allowed SAB Ltd to brew and distribute Amstel Lager in South Africa, was terminated, sparking a new era of competition for the industry. At the same time, Heineken announced its intention to build its own brewery in South Africa. SAB Ltd launched a new premium brand, Hansa Marzen Gold shortly thereafter and continued its expansion into premium brands with the launch of Dutch heritage beer, Grolsch, following SABMiller's acquisition of Koninklijke Grolsch N.V. in early 2008. Dreher Premium Lager was launched in South Africa the same year, and the company has made a number of innovations in the spirit cooler and apple-ale categories in recent years.

In October 2016, Anheuser-Busch InBev acquired the entire SABMiller company which then became a business division of Anheuser-Busch InBev SA/NV and ceased trading on the worldwide stock markets. As a result, South African Breweries and Carlton & United are now owned by Anheuser-Busch InBev SA/NV.

=== List of breweries ===
- Alrode Brewery, Gauteng, 26°18′48.5″S 28°08′11.2″E
- Chamdor Brewery, Gauteng, 26°09′12.2″S 27°47′40.3″E
- Ibhayi Brewery, Eastern Cape, 33°50′15.8″S 25°32′30.9″E
- Newlands Brewery, Western Cape, 33°58′23.5″S 18°27′56.9″E
- Polokwane Brewery, Limpopo, 23°51′50.0″S 29°28′21.1″E
- Prospecton Brewery, KwaZulu-Natal, 29°59′29.2″S 30°55′42.5″E
- Rosslyn Brewery, North West, 25°37′26.0″S 28°05′23.9″E

=== Soft drinks ===
In 1925, SAB expanded into other beverages after purchasing a large share in Schweppes (soft drinks). In 1960, the group purchased a controlling interest in Stellenbosch Farmer's Winery, which, along with Distillers Corporation, contributed R98 million to group earnings in 1997.

1997, SAB subsidiary, Amalgamated Beverage Industries, purchased another Coca-Cola bottler, Suncrush, thereby doubling market share to approximately 60 per cent of South African soft drinks. PepsiCo, SAB's only competitor, withdrew from the market in 1997 resulting in the liquidation of Pepsi franchisees. Pepsi, however, re-entered the South African market in 2006.

In December 2004, SAB Ltd acquired 100% of Amalgamated Beverage Industries Limited (ABI), which became the soft drink division of SAB Ltd, and the largest beverage company in South Africa was created.

=== Plate glass ===
In 1917, the group began to venture into unrelated businesses when it agreed to take over a failed glass manufacturer, Union Glass, to counter the acute shortage of bottles during World War I. In 1954, Union Glass merged with Consolidated Glassworks and this business was sold off in 1960 to Anglovaal Industries. The company became an important player in international glass manufacturing when it acquired the Plate Glass Group in 1992.

The Plate Glass Group traced its roots to a British immigrant and entrepreneur who, in 1897, established a plate glass manufacturing operation in Cape Town, South Africa. Eventually the company became a leading producer of safety and bullet-proof glass for automobiles. In 1987 the company launched a new subsidiary in the United States in partnership with SAB and Anglo American. When Glass medic, a US-based windshield repair and replacement company, was acquired in 1990, the South African parent company merged the subsidiaries under the name Belron International. Belron became a base from which to launch further acquisitions. When SAB purchased Plate Glass in 1992, it was renamed Shatterprufe Limited.

Belron had by 1998 become the world's leading producer of automotive replacement glass, with some 1,865 retail outlets in North America, Europe, Australia, and Brazil. Growth had come mainly through acquisitions. In 1997, Belron acquired several leading brands, including Standard Autoglass in Canada, thereby becoming "the largest player in the North American Markets." Worldwide market share was on the order of 18%, and SAB envisioned further expansion in the coming years:

In Europe, Belron was opening an average of 12 new outlets per month. While sales had increased by five per cent in 1997, earnings had declined eight per cent to R255 million as a result of the borrowing costs associated with new acquisitions and expansion.

In 1997, recognising the need to enhance long-term shareholder value, SAB returned to its core beverage business, locally and internationally, selling off or closing non-core operations over the next few years. Amongst these was the Plate Glass business.

=== Entertainment and hospitality ===
Although SAB (then called Castle Breweries) had established the first pub in South Africa in 1896, it did not begin to invest heavily in service industries until 1949 when an aggressive expansion thrust saw some £4.5 million invested in hotels and pubs, as well as additional brewing facilities.

In 1969, these interests were merged with a hotel chain owned by Sol Kerzner, to form a separate subsidiary known as Southern Sun Hotels. Kerzner remained with Southern Sun as its managing director for several years thereafter. In 1983 Kerzner left SAB, but remained a significant shareholder in the company.

Southern Sun eventually grew to become the leading hotel chain in South Africa, with franchises awarded by Holiday Inn and Inter Continental Hotels. By 1998, this subsidiary owned 74 hotels with 12,200 rooms, or about 22 per cent of industry capacity. Southern Sun also maintained a minority interest in an eco-tourism company.

Development of new hotels depended on securing licences from the government, "as the state still owned large tracts of land in both urban and rural areas." Suitable locations for hotel and resort development were very limited, and local government officials often did not have the training and expertise needed to make informed decisions about the granting of such licences. Resulting delays resulted in significant costs.

Several international hotel chains decided to enter South Africa after the lifting of economic sanctions. By 1998, numerous hotels were under construction by Hyatt, Sheraton, Howard Johnson's, Days Inn, Hilton, Best Western, Concorde, Le_Méridien, and Relais & Châteaux, among others. Most new hotel development was in the executive and luxury segments of the market. In less than four years, industry-wide capacity had more than doubled, and as a result, the hotel industry began to experience significant over-supply. Combined with a weak currency, this translated into some of the lowest room rates in the world.

Although escalating levels of violent crime had been a serious constraint for South African tourism, Southern Sun had been able to maintain an average occupancy above 70%. In 1997, hotel earnings increased by 16% over the previous year to contribute R182 million to group earnings.

The government introduced the National Gambling Act in 1996, which allowed for up to 40 casino licenses to be issued to "financially competent operators." In 1997, SAB entered into a joint-venture with Tsogo Sun Gaming and Entertainment to establish up to eight casino resorts to be completed as early as 2000. Monte Casino was the first of these developments to be completed at an expected construction cost of $US250 million.

The most notable black empowerment transaction facilitated by SAB was Tsogo Investments in early 2003. The transaction, which had an implied value of approximately R1.9-billion, meant that empowerment group Tsogo Investments acquired control of Southern Sun Hotels, then the largest hotel group in southern Africa as well as Tsogo Sun, a leading casino operator in South Africa.

=== Other manufacturing and retail ===
Further diversification came in 1967 with the establishment of a new subsidiary known as Food Corporation (coffee, tea, and food products). An even larger diversification push was undertaken in the 1970s and 1980s, when the SAB group of companies purchased or established numerous unrelated operations including grocers (OK Bazaars), furniture factories and stores (Associated Furniture Company), shoe factories and stores (Shoecorp), and clothing stores (Scotts Stores and Edgars Fashion Group). In 1996, more than 20% of SAB's workforce was employed in these companies.

Changes in consumer preferences towards less expensive goods had a negative effect on the premium retail market in the mid-1990s. SAB off-loaded the OK Bazaar grocery chain in 1997 for one rand, after losing nearly R20 million per month. And at the beginning of 1998, the Clothing and Footwear, as well as the furniture divisions were also sold. Later SAB also sold its 21% minority stake in Edgars Fashion Group in 2004.

SAB no longer holds any manufacturing or retail assets.

=== International expansion ===
The company's earliest international venture was in 1910 when it founded Rhodesian Breweries in Southern Rhodesia, now Zimbabwe. This subsidiary spearheaded SAB's initial international expansion efforts, having established new breweries in Northern Rhodesia, now Zambia and Bulawayo, Southern Rhodesia, in the early 1950s. Further international expansion came in the 1970s and 1980s with the establishment of breweries in Botswana, Angola, and the buying of Compañía Cervezera de Canarias of the Canary Islands. Nevertheless, prior to 1990, SAB remained primarily focused on domestic opportunities.

In 1994, a formal Export Department consisting of 3 people (Neal & McLellan et al.) was established at Beer Division Central Office and was tasked with trading beer into Africa. This proved to be a masterstroke in strategy as it laid the foundations for a significant growth catalyst for brand and accordingly, market share establishment into African and Indian Ocean markets, as well as generated significant foreign currency for the group to allow for investment (South African Reserve Bank regulations at the time made raising foreign capital difficult). SAB was invited to revitalise the beer industry in Tanzania, a joint venture with that country's government in Tanzania Breweries Limited, and to re-enter the beer markets of Zambia, Mozambique and, later, Angola. This followed one of its first foreign investments into the Canary Islands. Expansion continued into Africa in the 1990s and on other continents into Hungary (1993), China (1995), Romania, Poland (1995–96), Slovakia (1997), and Russia (1998), the Czech Republic (1999), India (2000) and Central America in 2001.

The group's expansion into Asia started with its 1995 negotiation of joint control of the second-largest brewery in mainland China with China Resources, a privatisation arm of the government of the People's Republic of China. Further investments included those in the Harbin Brewery Group and the Fuyang City Snowland Brewery. In 2000 SAB plc entered the Indian market where it has subsequently increased its commitment.

By 2001, turnover from SAB plc's international operations accounted for 42% of group turnover. The same year, a pan-African strategic alliance with the Castel Group offered the opportunity to invest in promising new African markets and the benefits of scale economies.

Involvement in Central and South America started in 2001 with the acquisition of Honduran and Salvadoran breweries. This was followed four years later by the purchase of a major holding in Grupo Empresarial Bavaria, South America's second largest brewer.

One of its largest transactions was with the Miller Brewing Company in the US in 2002, whereupon the listed company changed its name to SABMiller plc.

By the end of March 2009, SABMiller produced global lager volumes of 210 million hectolitres, with total group revenues of US$25,302 million.

On 10 October 2016, Anheuser-Busch InBev acquired SABMiller for £69 billion. The arrangement had been approved by shareholders of both companies on 28 September 2016, and the deal closed on 10 October 2016. The acquisition, subsequently referred to as a merger in the news media, ended the corporate use of the name SABMiller. The new company is called Anheuser-Busch InBev SA/NV, (AB InBev) and is trading on the Brussels Stock Exchange as ABI.BR and as BUD on the New York stock exchange. SABMiller ceased trading on global stock markets and divested itself of its interests in the MillerCoors beer company to Molson Coors.

After acquiring SABMiller, Anheuser-Busch InBev SA/NV agreed on 21 December 2016 to sell the former SABMiller Ltd. business in Poland, the Czech Republic, Slovakia, Hungary and Romania to Asahi Breweries Group Holdings, Ltd. for US$7.8 billion. The deal includes popular brands such as Pilsner Urquell, Tyskie, Lech, Dreher and Ursus.

SABMiller was one of the world's largest Coca-Cola bottlers and had carbonated soft drinks bottling operations in 14 markets. These were subsequently owned by the new Anheuser-Busch InBev SA/NV entity which is also a PepsiCo bottler. In December 2016, Coca-Cola Co. bought the Coca-Cola operations in Africa and in two Central American countries. The deal requires regulatory approval and should close by the end of 2017.

== List of products ==
- Carling Black Label
- Castle Lager
  - Castle tank
  - Castle Free
  - Castle Lite
  - Castle Milk Stout
  - Castle Double Malt
- Flying Fish
  - Flying Fish Chill Lite
- Hansa pilsener
  - Hansa Golden Crisp
- Lion Lager
- Brutal Fruit
- Redd's
- Newlands Brewery
  - Mountain Weiss
  - Passionate Blond
  - Jacobs Pale Ale
- Budweiser
- Corona extra
- Liberado
- Beck's

== Controversy ==
In March 2014, the Competition Tribunal found that the South African Breweries (SAB) did not engage in any anti-competitive behaviour following a case of alleged anti-competitive behaviour brought by the Competition Commission which was heard by the Tribunal between 2010 and 2013. The case was the result of an investigation into allegations related to SAB's distribution system and pricing activities between 2004 and 2007, with the allegations having been referred to the Competition Tribunal in 2007.

Throughout the trial, the company maintained that none of its practices were in breach of the law and that it had not engaged in any anti-competitive behaviour. It noted that "SAB has structured its business to serve retailers and consumers and strongly believes that all businesses have the right to distribute their products in the manner that best serves their needs…”

The case was in the public domain for several years, having been referred to the Competition Tribunal in 2007 by the Competition Commission after a three-year investigation between 2004 and 2007. The original complaint lodged by Big Daddy's head Nico Pitsiladis with the Competition Commission alleged that SAB charged the Big Daddy's group as a wholesaler the same price as the company charged to retailers, thereby preventing Big Daddy's from earning a fair margin on its sales to retail.

The case that was presented by the Competition Commission before the Competition Tribunal related to SAB's distribution system; an alleged practice of minimum resale price maintenance; an allegation of price discrimination and broad, diffuse allegations relating to abuse of dominance. The abuse of dominance allegations were previously separated from the "distribution" case and may proceed separately although the commission has taken no further steps on this part of the case.

SAB applied in 2011 to have the case dismissed, arguing that the case presented to the Tribunal was not the same as the original complaint laid by the Big Daddy's group in 2004. This was upheld by the Tribunal in April 2011.

Following the Tribunal's dismissal of the case in April 2011, the Competition Commission applied to the Constitutional Court for direct access to the Constitutional Court, bypassing both the Competition Appeal Court and the Supreme Court of Appeal. In December 2011, the Constitutional Court handed down a decision in which it dismissed, with costs, the Competition Commission's direct access application.

The Commission subsequently filed an appeal with the Competition Appeal Court, which was heard on 13 September 2012. In November 2012, the Competition Appeal Court announced it had upheld the commission's appeal and set aside the Tribunal's ruling. This resulted in the resumption of the commission's case against SAB, which was heard before the Tribunal in July and August 2013.
