= Tyskie Brewing Museum =

Museum in Silesia, Poland

Coordinates: 50.1321°N 18.9817°E

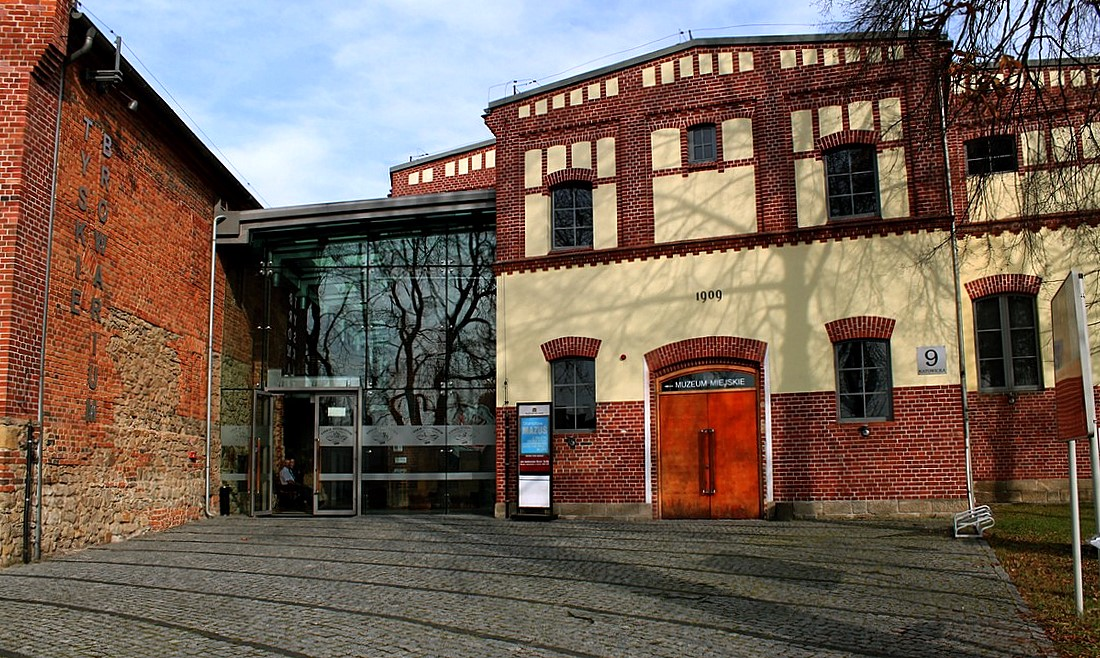
Museum entrance

The Tyskie Brewing Museum or Tyskie Browarium is a museum in Tychy in Silesia, Poland. It was established in 2004. The museum is an Anchor point on the European Route of Industrial Heritage. It is an object of cultural heritage in Silesia (259/10), and a Polish national monument (641660).

During a 2009 vote the brewery complex was voted as one of the "Seven Architectural Wonders of the Silesian Voivodeship."

== History ==
Tyskie beer has been on sale since 1629. The brewery, then called "Fürstliche Brauerei in Tichau", produced three kinds of beer: mailings, yeast and tableware. Only the high quality beer was intended for sale, and the other two were a beer allowance drunk mainly by brewers and their families.

In the early 19th century, the brewery produced only two beverages: beer and Bavarian malt, both top-fermenting. Bavarian malt with a classical composition, saturated color was brown, sweet, calorie and low-hopped. The standard was the dark weak niskoekstraktowe, that was only for immediate consumption.

Prince Jan Henryk XI rebuilt the brewery 1861, he introduced a steam engine. Production rose to 100.000 hectoliters a year, making the brewery one of the largest beer producers in Europe. After the expansion and the introduction of bottom-fermenting, they started to produce beer in March, called Tyskie lager, a relatively short Bavarian beer. The first beers were light and were sold under the Książęce brand. The brewery was electrified in 1891 and was linked to the railway network in 1894.

In the interwar period, popular brands from Tyskie were the Książęce Tyskie Pilsen, the Książęce Tyskie Export, the Książęce Tyskie full beer, and Tyskie Porter. Today the Tyskie Górny Śląsk brewery is owned by Kompania Piwowarska, itself a subsidiary of SABMiller established in Poland in 1999 as a result of the merger of two SABMiller owned Polish breweries, this one and the Lech Brewery Wielkopolski in Poznań.
