= Żubr (beer) =

Polish lager

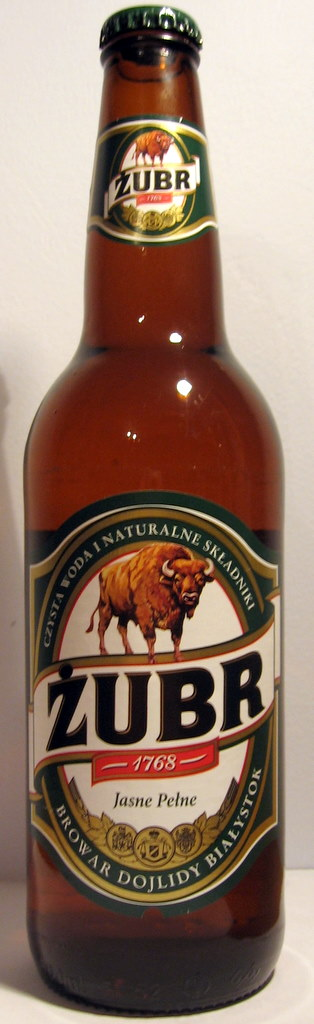
- Type: Beer
- Origin: Poland
- Introduced: 1768
- Alcohol by volume: 6.0%
- Website: www.zubr.pl

Żubr beer (Polish for Bison) is a Polish lager brewed by the Kompania Piwowarska SA. It was formerly known as Dojlidy, the name of the brewery in the Białystok district of Dojlidy, where it is produced.

== Brand ==
Żubr has been brewed since the Dojlidy Brewery opened in 1768. The Białystok based brewery was bought by the SABMiller subsidiary Kompania Piwowarska SA in 2003. The brew contains 12.1% (by weight) of extract content and 6.0% alcohol. Currently it is brewed at three Kompania Piwowarska breweries: Białystok, Poznań and Tychy.

== Marketing ==
It is available throughout Poland, and is also available in many off-licences in the UK and Ireland, due to demand for the beer from the Polish population in these countries. As of 2010, it was the second most popular beer in Poland, with 14% market control. It is rare in the United States, although it has started to be sold around the Chicago area.

The cans and bottles use a distinctive green packaging. The logo prominently features a Żubr, or European bison.

== Prażubr, Bizon and Prabizon ==
In April 2016, Kompania Piwowarska launched another special beer on the market. Prażubr is an unpasteurized lager with moderate bitterness and an alcohol content of 5% vol. It is available in returnable bottles and in 500 ml cans. His recipe was developed at the Dojlidy Białystok brewery. The product's name refers to the steppe bison – a mammal from the Pleistocene period, related to today's European bison. Advertising spots also emphasize the similarity between these species.

== See also ==
- Polish beer
- Kompania Piwowarska
