= Ohlsson's Cape Breweries =

Former brewing company in Cape Town, South Africa

- Location: Newlands, Cape Town, Western Cape, South Africa
- Opened: 1881
- Key people: Anders Ohlsson
- Parent: South African Breweries

The Ohlsson's Cape Breweries was a South African brewing company located in Newlands, Cape Town. It was founded around 1881 by a Swedish immigrant and industrialist, Anders Ohlsson. Ohlsson's was bought out by Castle Breweries and merged to form South African Breweries in 1956. South African Breweries continued to sell locally produced beer under the Ohlsson's brand until its discontinuation in the late 1990s.
