= Dojlidy Ponds =

Dojlidy ponds
- Stawy Dojlidzkie
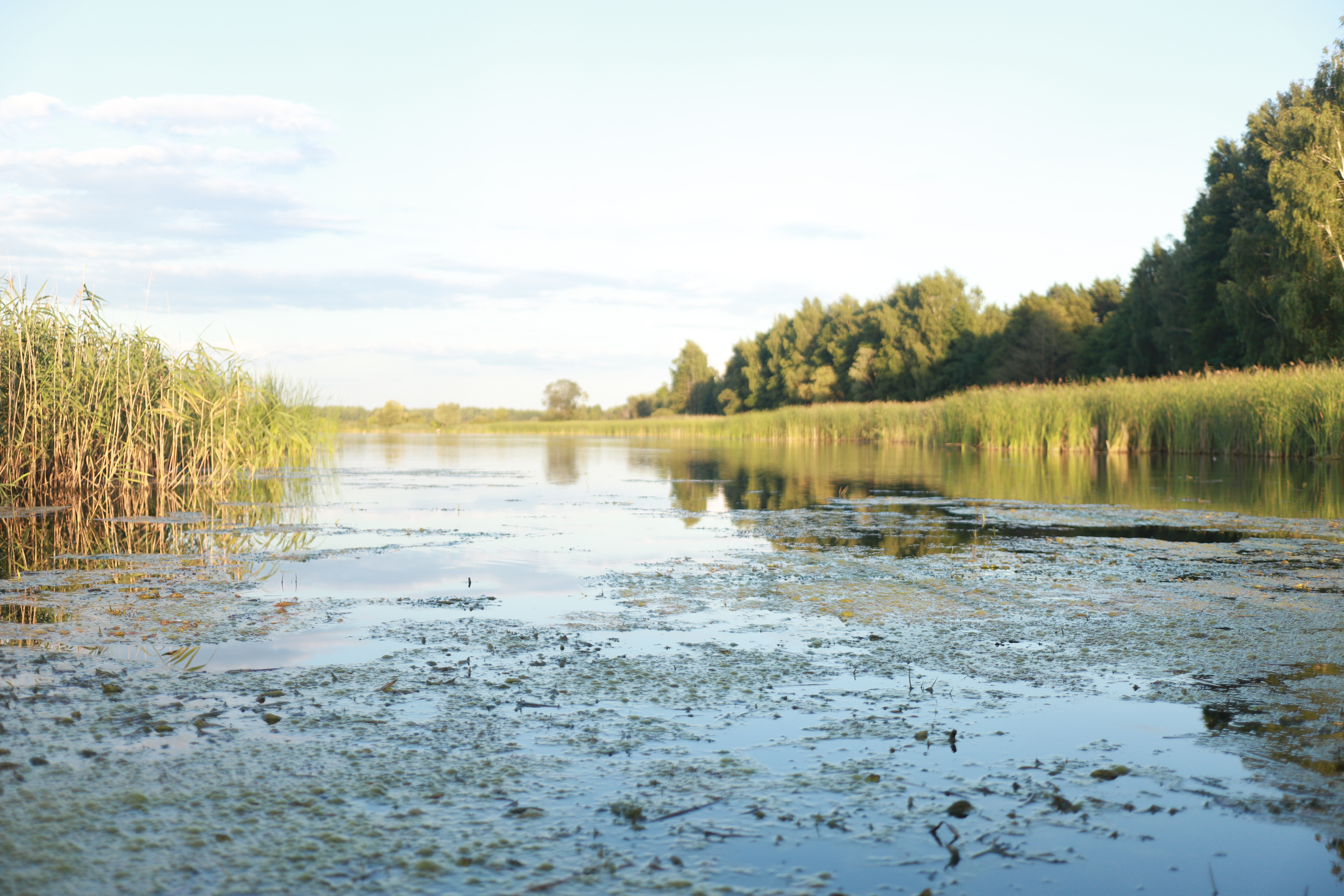
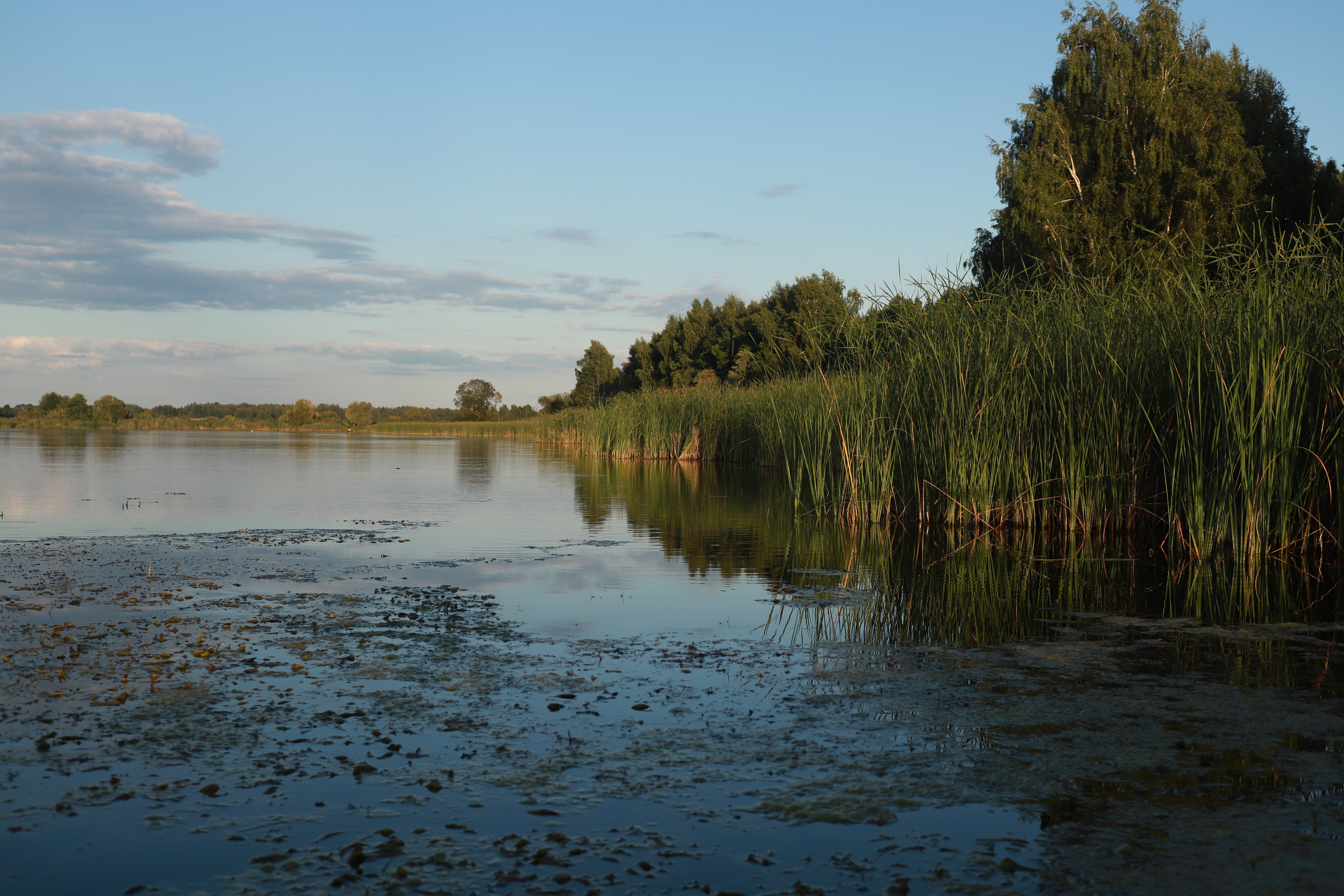
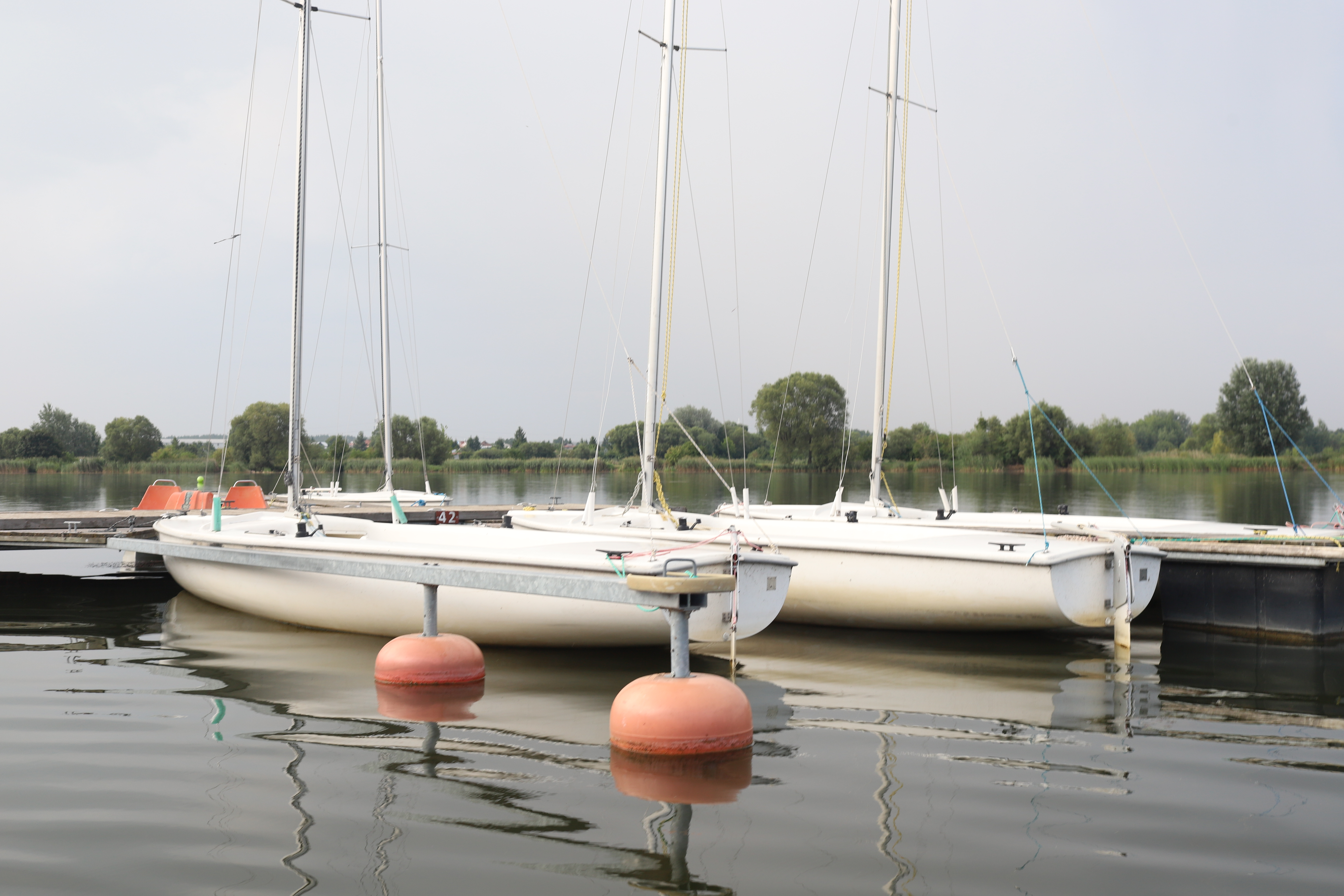
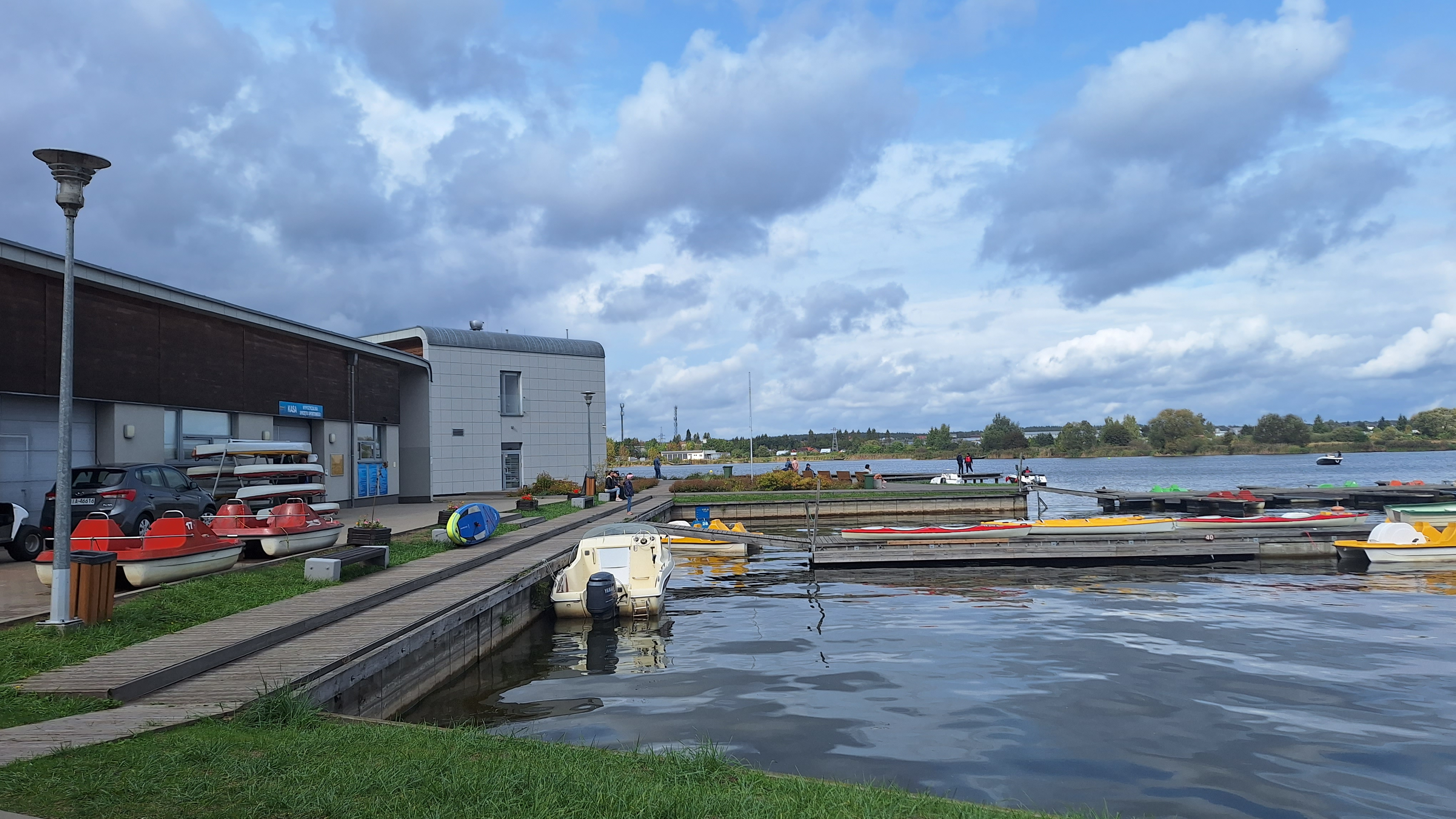
- Interactive map of Dojlidy ponds
- Type: Municipal
- Location: Białystok
- Coordinates: 53°06′31.54″N 23°13′54.45″E
- Area: 14.94 ha
- Status: Open all year

Dojlidy Ponds (Polish: Stawy Dojlidzkie) is a complex of 19 ponds with a total area of approximately 400 ha located on the south-eastern area of Białystok in Dojlidy District on the border with the village of Sobolewo.

== History ==
In 1933, the idea of using the fish ponds in Dojlidy was born. The Białystok city hall leased them for 13 years. The water was drained, gravel was poured and construction of accompanying facilities began. The center was planned for 2,000 people. The official opening took place in May 1936. The city bathing area contained 130 m of gravel beach, sidewalks, changing rooms, 10 changing cabins, a café on the terrace. In 1937, water bikes also appeared on the shore of the reservoir.

In 1962, work began on the construction of a reservoir for recreational purposes on the premises of the complex. As a result of damming the Biała River, in place of the Plażowy (name taken over by the new reservoir) and Cygański fishing ponds, a reservoir was created with an area of about 34 ha, length 1,170 m and width 370 m. The average depth of the reservoir is about 2m. Its surface is located at an altitude of 136.5 m above sea level (maximum height of water damming). On the southern shore of the reservoir is the Water Sports Centre of the Białystok Sports and Recreation Centre, which includes a municipal bathing area ("Dojlidy" Municipal Beach).

== Fauna ==
There are around 200 species at Dojlidy Ponds, including very rare ones, such as the great white heron, little egrets, cormorants, black-throated loon, shelduck, merganser, velvet scoter, pelicans, red-footed falcons, terek, short-toed snake eagle, golden eagle, pallid gull, three-toed gull and others. Some of the birds do not appear in the Biebrza National Park or the Narew National Park. And both of them are famous for their extremely rich ornithofauna.

Large, shallow reservoirs are also a favourable environment for amphibians. Among the species that exist here are the fire-bellied toad, the grey toad, the green toad and the natterjack toad, the common tree frog, the common newt and the crested newt, as well as huge numbers of all kinds of frogs.

== Bibliography ==
- Oniszczuk, Jan; Wiśniewski, Tomasz (2011). Białystok między wojnami. Opowieść o życiu miasta 1918-1939 (in Polish). Księży Młyn Dom Wydawniczy. ISBN 9788377290156.
