= Compania Cervecera de Canarias =

Spanish brewery

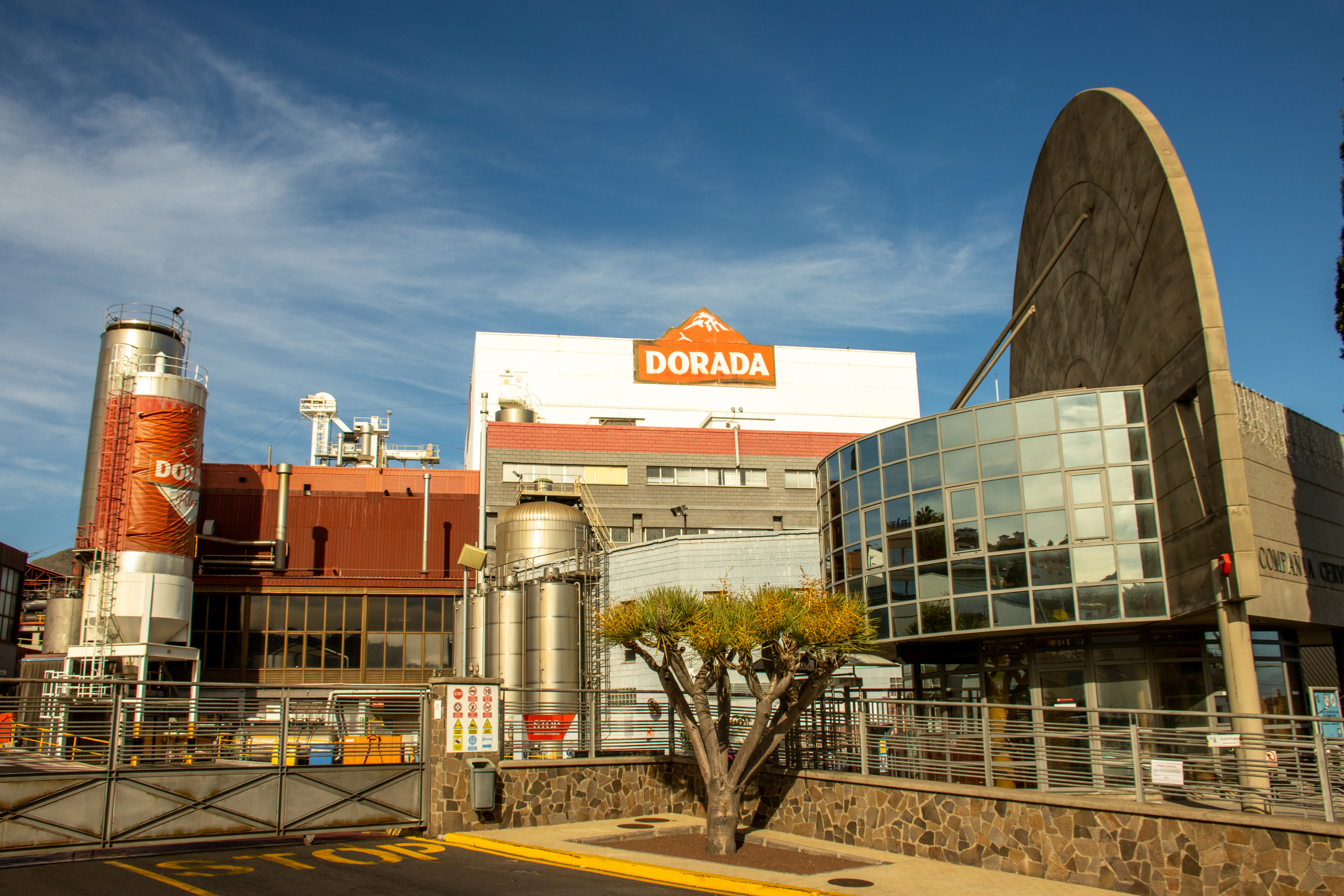
The brewery in Santa Cruz de Tenerife

The Compañía Cervecera de Canarias (CCC) is a brewery based in Santa Cruz de Tenerife that was founded in 1939 when it started to make a beer that is today called Dorada. In 1994 it merged with the Sociedad Industrial Canaria (Sical) based in Las Palmas de Gran Canaria, which traced its roots back to the La Tropical brewery founded in 1924. Today the company is part of the international group AB InBev, following the successful merger between SAB Miller and AB InBev.

== Sociedad Industrial Canaria (Sical) ==
In 1924, entrepreneur Castor Gómez Navarro founded the brewing company La Tropical in Las Palmas de Gran Canaria, but the start of the Spanish Civil War led to its bankruptcy and it was acquired by a group of entrepreneurs who created the Sociedad Industrial Canaria. The production of this new society went beyond the scope of a brewer, and was involved in other sectors such as coffee, chocolate and fishing.

The opening in 1960 of the Barranco Seco factory in Las Palmas resulted in the expansion of the company, which later became the leading company producing beer in the Canary Islands as well as one of the largest local businesses. It produced, and still does today, a Pilsener beer named Tropical.

== Compañía Cervecera de Canarias (Cercasa) ==
In August 1939, a group of Canarian businessmen headed by Maximino Acea Perdomo founded the first brewery on the island of Tenerife, the Compañía Cervecera de Canarias (Cercasa) in Santa Cruz.

The company launch occurred in turbulent times, Spain was plunged into the war and the rest of the world was preparing for World War II. As a result, the equipment that was purchased in Germany could not reach Tenerife through the end of 1945. In July 1948 the first beer was bottled under the supervision of the German brewmaster Hans Carlos. CCC was the name of that beer, which in the 1960s was renamed Dorada. In the 1970s, a new modern factory opened, contributing to the expansion of the company.

Recent achievements of the brand include being awarded the gold medal by the International Institute for Quality Selections, in its Monde Selection 2011 contest for its Dorada, Dorada Especial and Dorada Sin products. In the International Taste & Quality Institute, an independent organization of chefs and sommeliers based in Brussels, at its Superior Taste Award, Dorada Especial was awarded two stars.

== Products ==
- Dorada
- Dorada Especial
- Dorada Sin
- Dorada Sin con Limón
- Tropical
- Tropical Premium
- Tropical Limón
