= Osiedle Dojlidy, Białystok =

Dojlidy
- District (osiedle) of Białystok
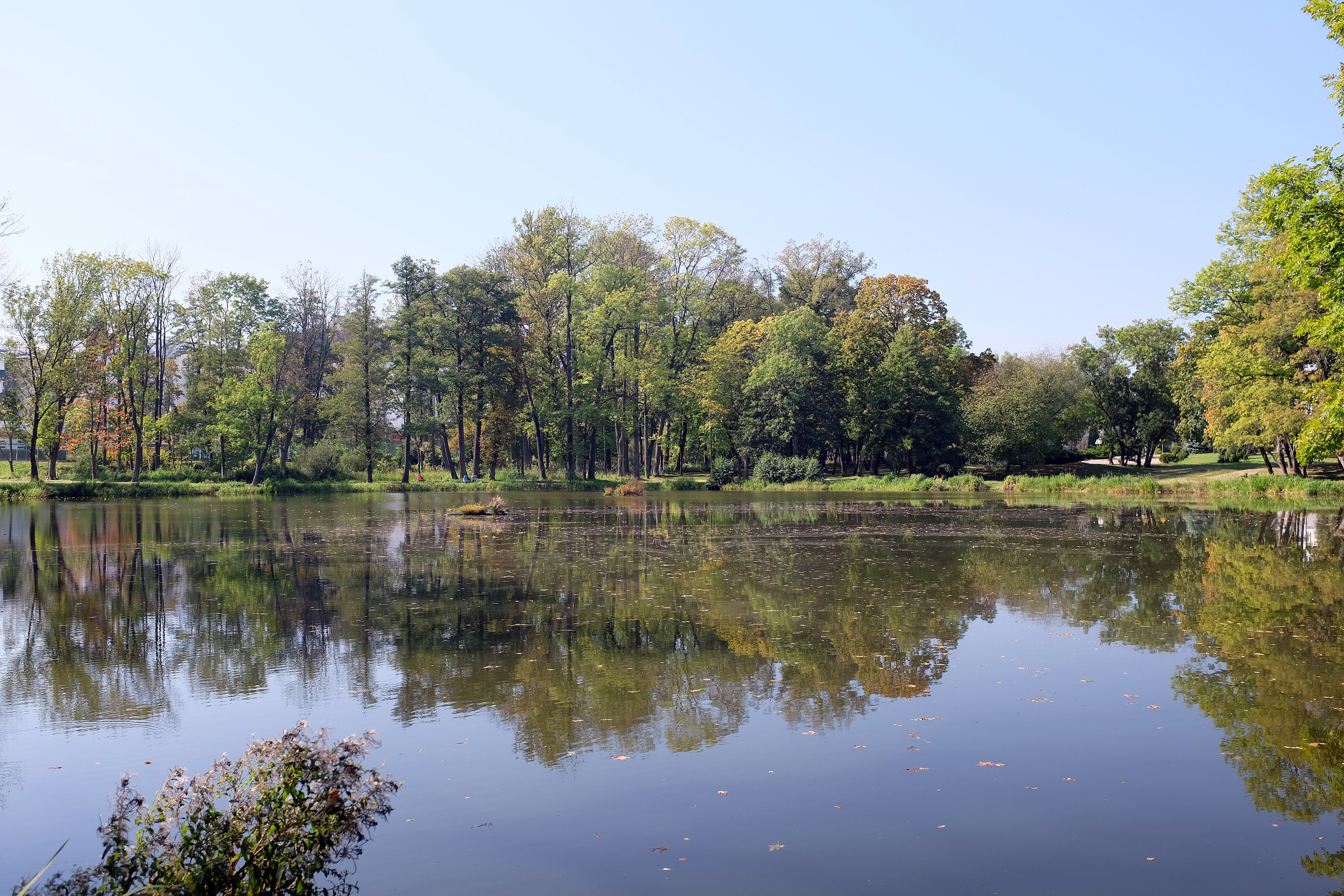

- Location of Dojlidy within Białystok
- Coordinates: 53°06′05″N 23°10′20″E
- Country: Poland
- Voivodeship: Podlaskie
- City: Białystok

Area
  - Total: 14.038 km^{2} (5.420 sq mi)

Dojlidy is a district of the Polish city of Białystok, formerly a village and farmlands. It is also known for its brewery, plywood factory (Fabryka Sklejek Biaform SA) and the Dojlidy fish ponds and recreation areas on the White River reservoirs. Until 1954 there was a Gmina Dojlidy, after which point it was incorporated into the city. District with the largest area in Bialystok.

== History ==
In contrast to Białystok, which until the Third Partition of Poland in 1795 was part of the Kingdom of Poland, Dojlidy, belonged to the Grand Duchy of Lithuania within the Polish–Lithuanian Commonwealth.

According to the 1921 census, the population of Dojlidy was 95.3% Polish and 4.7% Belarusian.

== Name ==
The term Dojlidy comes from the Lithuanian word "dailidė" meaning carpenter, which makes it possible to speculate that Dojlidy was a settlement of carpenters, which in turn is confirmed by the forest character of the area. This concept was presented by prof. Michał Kondratiuk. A similar origin of the name Dojlid is also indicated by Andrzej Danieluk, underlining the Old Belarusian root of the loanword from Lithuanian –word "dojlida" meaning carpenter (in modern Belarusian "дойлід" means "architect").

== Facilities and green spaces ==
- Neoclassical palace Rüdigerów (19th century) and the park, now the seat of government for the Higher School of Public Administration
- Neo-Renaissance palace Hasbacha (19th century) containing offices for:
  - Regional Centre for Research and Documentation of Monuments
  - Regional Office for the Protection of Monuments in Białystok
  - Polish Heritage Conservation Workshops SA, a division of Bialystok
  - a settlement near the factory floor Hasbacha
  - Bialystok WOPR
  - Podlaskie Province by WOPR
  - Scientific Society of Bialystok
  - Business Club of Podlaski
  - The Foundation for Polish Green Lungs
- Collegium Novum WSAP
- District Hospital
- Airport Krywlany Sports
  - Aeroclub of Bialystok
- Forest and Communal Solnicki
- Dojlidy (est. 1769)
- Plywood Industry Plant "Biaform"
- Church. Christ the King
- Church. Immaculate Heart of Mary
- Orthodox Church. St. Ilia and the Orthodox cemetery

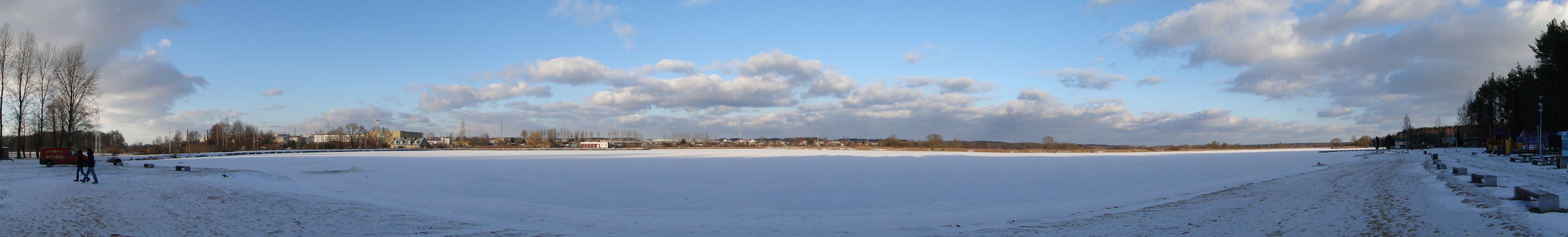
Zalew Dojlidy

- Ponds Dojlidzkie
- Lagoon Dojlidy
  - a Sports Club MOSiR at Urban Beach
    - Allotments
- Green City
- District Office
- Secondary School No. 8 - st. Crane 12
- Library branch of the Library Podlaska No. 11 (in the building of the Secondary School No. 8) - st. Crane 12
- Agricultural Schools
- Public School No. 31, Primary School No. 52
- Social II High School, Middle School No. 1 Social
- Tennis Association "Stanley" of Tennis Courts
- Internal Security Agency Branch in Bialystok

== A description of district boundaries prior to 1 January 2006 ==
From the administrative boundary of the city street Viaduct, by the Square 10 Lithuanian Cavalry Regiment, of street Nowowarszawskiej K. Tsiolkovsky, Nowowarszawską, Dojnowską to the administrative border of the city, along the border of the forest and the shores of the lagoon Dojlidzkiego, a piece of beach along the street, including Orthodox cemetery and church, a piece of street Suchowolca, then a piece of street Dojlidy top, then the eastern access to the brewery pond przybrowarnego, Solnička street, and beyond, surround Forest Solnicki, administrative boundary of the city, back to the road bridge.

== Streets and squares located within the settlements (before 1 January 2006) ==
Bartnicza, Beavers, Stork, Badger, Konstantin Tsiolkovsky-even 2/2-12C, Dojnowska-even, Dojlidy Factory-odd, even from 1913 to the end, Jaskolcza, Deer, Cormorants, Crete, Rabbit, Fr. Stanislaus Suchowolca, Kuropatwiana, Swan, Elk, John Michalowski, Adam Mickiewicz University building 106-odd, odd 95-95F, Hunting, Bear, Nowowarszawska-odd 116–128, Pavia, even Plażowa-88 C-88D, the Birds, Rondo 10 Regiment Lithuanian Lancers, Lynx, Sarnia, sepia, nightingale, Sokol, joint-odd 2-14, odd 1-37/1, Ostrich, Szpacza, Tiger, Viaduct-odd, Squirrel, Wolf, Hare, Turtle, Bison, Crane.
