= Castle Brewery =

South African brewery

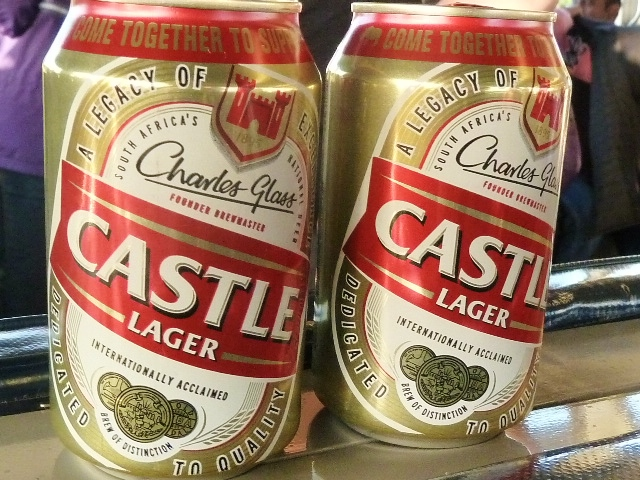
Two cans of Castle Lager, 2014

Castle Brewery is one of the oldest commercial breweries in South Africa. As company-endorsed legend would have it, the company was founded by Charles Glass in Johannesburg in 1894. UCT history professor Anne Kelk Mager has argued that the official SAB story overemphasized the role of Charles and that it was his wife Lisa Glass who was primarily responsible for the creation of Castle. It later merged with other breweries to form South African Breweries, which still later merged with Miller of the United States to form SABMiller.

On October 10, 2016, Anheuser-Busch InBev acquired SABMiller for £69 billion (US $107 billion at the time the deal closed a year later). The arrangement had been approved by shareholders of both companies on 28 September 2016, and the deal closed on 10 October 2016. The acquisition, subsequently referred to as a merger in the news media, ended the corporate use of the name SABMiller. The new company is called Anheuser-Busch InBev SA/NV, (AB InBev) and is trading as ABI on the Brussels Stock Exchange, as BUD on the New York stock exchange and as ANH on the Johannesburg market. SABMiller ceased trading on global stock markets and became a business division of Anheuser Busch Inbev SA/NV. On October 11, 2016, Anheuser Busch Inbev SA/NV divested itself of its interests in the MillerCoors beer company to Molson Coors.

Since SABMiller no longer exists as an entity, South African Breweries is now a subsidiary of Anheuser-Busch InBev SA/NV (abbreviated as AB InBev).

== History ==
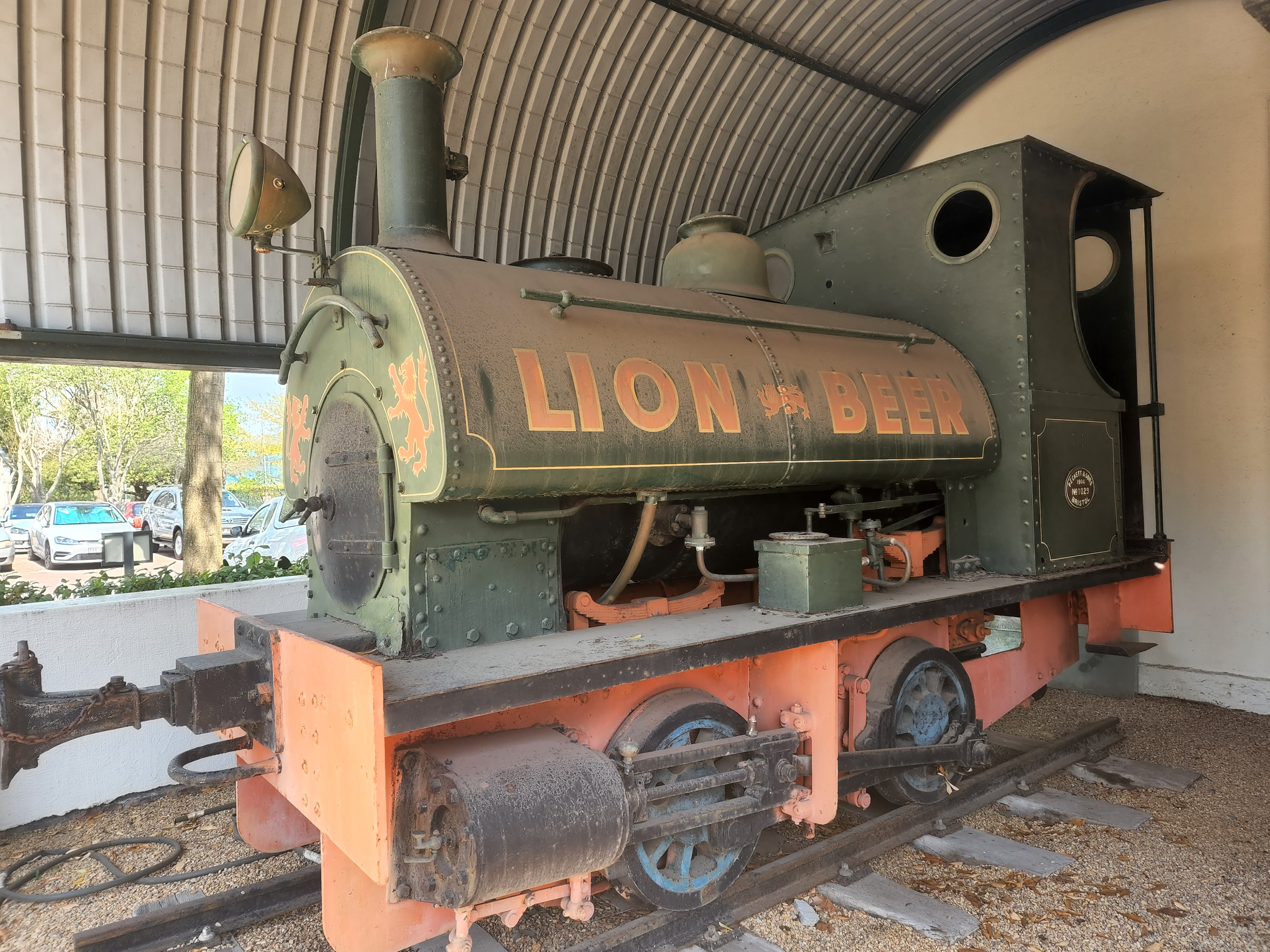
A train used at the Lion Beer brewery in Newlands around the turn of the 20th century.

Prior to incorporation in 1895, Castle Brewery had operations in Cape Town to serve the steady expansion of a settler community from the mid-17th century. The demand for beer prompted the first Dutch governor, Jan van Riebeeck, to establish a brewery at the Fort (later replaced by the Castle in central Cape Town) as early as 1658, beating the first wine production by six months. In the same year, Pieter Visagie brewed the first beer from the waters of the Liesbeeck River. Over the next 200 years, brewing made its mark in the Cape and beyond. Noted brewers of the time included Cloete at the Newlands Brewery; Ohlsson at the Anneberg Brewery; Jacob Letterstedt at Mariendahl Brewery, also in Newlands: Hiddingh at Cannon Brewery; Martienssen at the Salt River Brewery, and a second Cloete in Kloof Street.

One of the key figures in the story of Newlands, and in South African beer manufacturing history, was Swede Anders Ohlsson, who sailed for Africa, aged 23, in 1864. Initially, he imported Swedish goods and timbers, and developed an extensive trade network and a solid business empire. Then he turned to brewing, basing himself at Newlands, where he produced Lion Lager. In 1956, Castle Brewery bought out Ohlssons and Chandlers Union Breweries and the company, for the first time, became known as the South African Breweries.

== Brands ==
The main brand is Castle Lager, first brewed in 1895. Castle Lager has won many awards, from gold medals to the "World's Best Bottled Lager" award at the 2000 International Brewing Industry Awards. The lager has 5% ABV with a unique light hops taste, advertised as "somewhat dry, somewhat bitter, never sweet" and as "the beer that stood the test of time".

South African Breweries is a major supporter of South African sport, and Castle Lager is the official sponsor of the South African cricket and soccer teams. Until 2004, it was also the primary sponsor of the national rugby team, the Springboks, but that position has now been taken by Standard bank Group Limited.
