= Dojlidy Brewery =

Brewery located in Białystok, Poland

Coordinates: 53.1078°N 23.2042°E

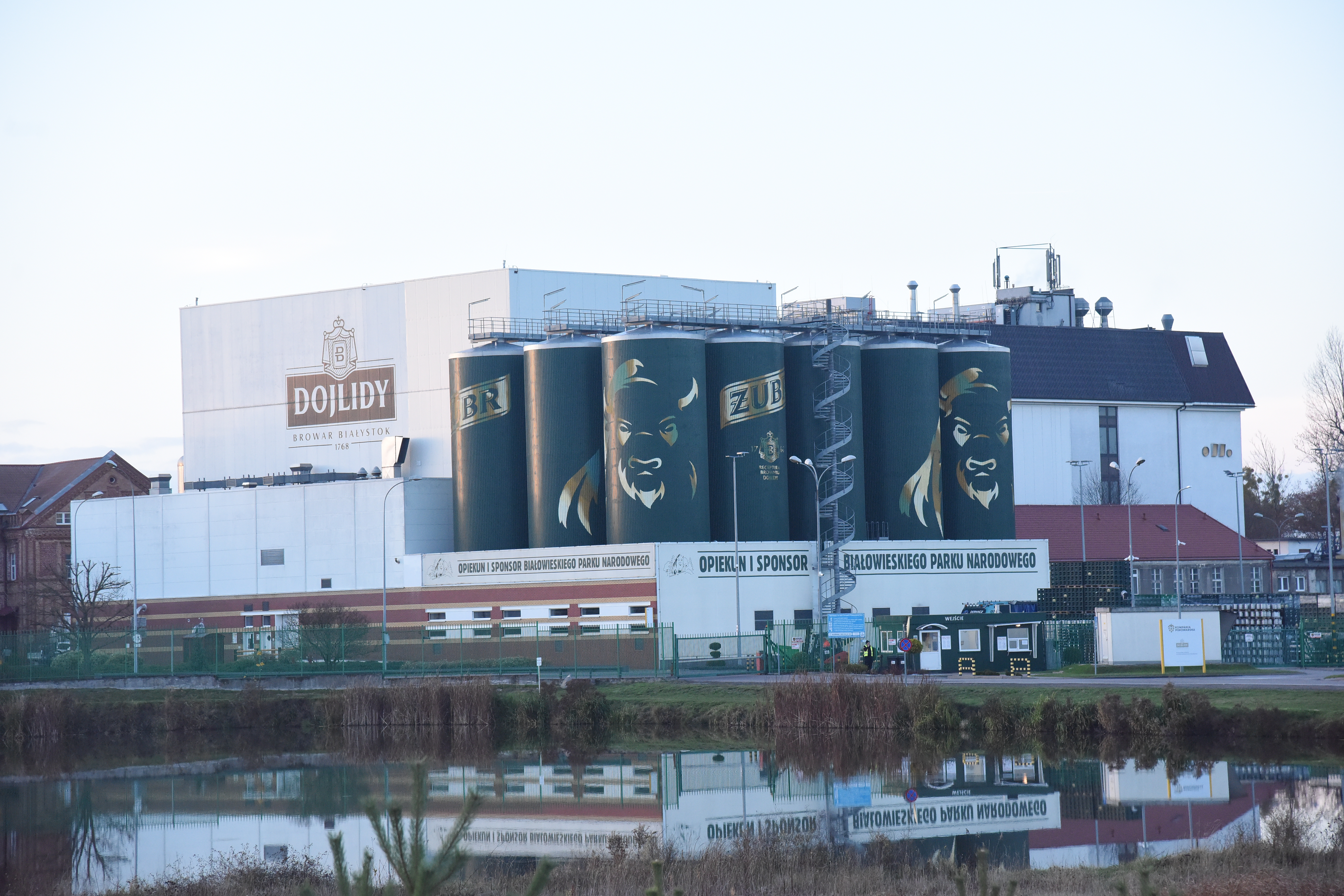
- Type: Brewery
- Location: Białystok, Poland
- Opened: 1768
- Owned by: Kompania Piwowarska
- Website: Official website

Active beers
Zubr
| Name | Type |

Dojlidy Brewery /dɔɪˈliːdə/ (Polish: Browar Dojlidy [ˌbrɔvar dɔjˈlidɨ]) is a brewery located in Białystok, Poland, and owned by Kompania Piwowarska SA, the Polish subsidiary of Asahi Breweries. The brewery was modernized between 1997 and 1999, then in 2003 it was purchased by Kompania Piwowarska SA. The Dojlidy Brewery used to make many different brands of beer, after being bought by Kompania Piwowarska S.A. their main product is Żubr. Żubr is one of the most popular beers in Poland and is also on sale throughout Europe.

Unusually for Polish beers, Żubr is now 6.0%.

== History ==
=== Beginnings ===
The first beer factory was built in Dojlidy in 1768 by the Dojlido family. In 1771, all of Białostock brewery was inherited by Izabella Poniatowska and production at the brewery stopped.

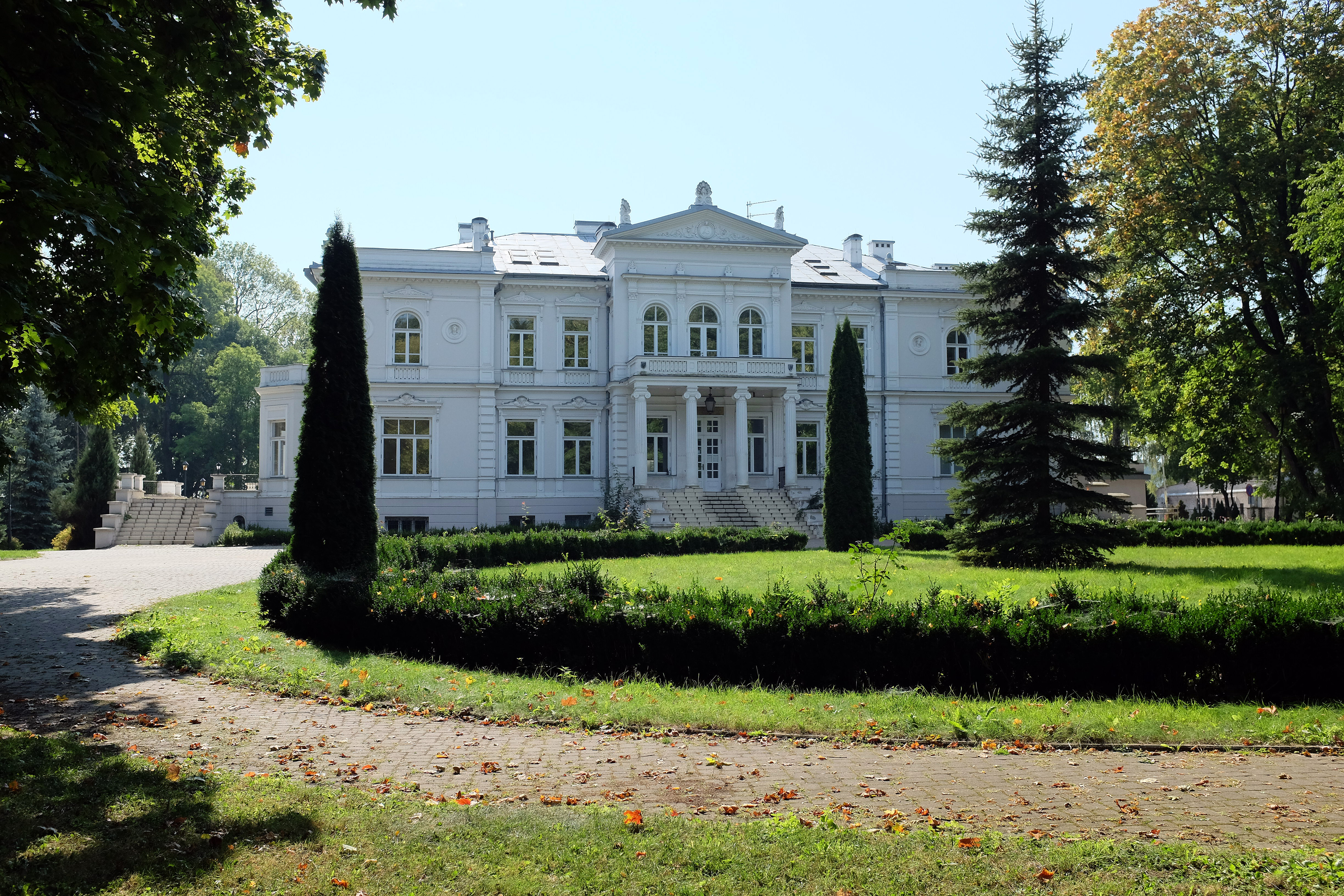
Lubomirski formerly Rüdigerów Palace

In 1891, the property was owned by the family of Count Rüdigerów. At their initiative and on the site of a former manor Krusensternów, a neoclassical style mansion was built, and near this a steam brewery was constructed.

The Doilidy Brewery was founded in 1891. It was taken over by the Lubomirski family in 1920 and went through a huge modernisation.

=== World War I ===
During the period of World War I, the complex survived almost intact as Dojlidy Brewery. Unfortunately, in 1915 the Russians took all the equipment from the brewery.

=== The interwar years ===
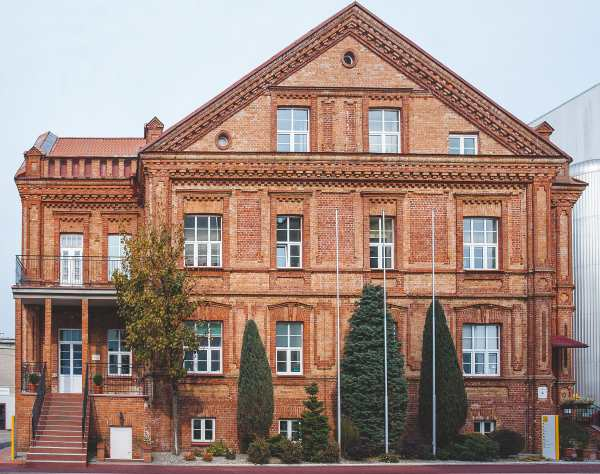
Dojlidy Brewery

After Poland regained independence in 1919, the General Administrator of goods, Baron Rudolf von Brandstein, through various informal discussions with the government authorities, managed to get permission to re-launch the brewery. The permit for the reconstruction was obtained despite the fact that the owner of the property Dojlidy, Sophia Kruzenszternów Rüdiger, lived permanently in Berlin and did not have Polish citizenship, so that the Minister of Agriculture and National Goods, under the law on agrarian reform, issued December 30, 1919 by the decision of acquisition of assets under state management. This order was never entered into force, and the property remained in the hands of the Baroness. In 1921, the Baroness sold the entire property for five million German marks to Dyskontowemu Bank in Warsaw and the Polish-American People's Bank in Kraków.

The entire property was sold to Prince George Lubomirski Raphael, in whose possession the beer company underwent a complete renovation. In the late twenties Dojlidy brewery occupied the seventh place in terms of beer production in the country and was the biggest such facility on the east of Poland. Dojlidy beer was sold in Grodno, Brest, Vilnius, Slonim, Baranovichi, Warsaw and others. Between the brewery dojlidzki reached an annual production volume of approximately 75 000 hl of beer and employed about 150 workers. Good Dojlidy were in the possession of the Lubomirski, 1939

=== World War II ===
During World War II the brewery's Dojlidy beer was exported to Germany. During the withdrawal of German troops from Bialystok in the year 1944, the brewery was destroyed.

=== Years after the war ===
It was rebuilt between 1948 and 1954 as Białostockie Zakłady Piwowarsko-Słodownicze. After 12 February 1948, when it takes over the brewery dojlidzki state, rebuilding began. The plant was opened only in 1954. The former brewery, beer bottling plant was completed initially, and then rebuilt production line and resumed production as Białostockie BEER-malting plants in Bialystok. In 1969 they were transformed with the running of breweries in Lomza and Suwalki in plants Breweries Sp. z o. o. In 1969 it was turned along with acquired breweries in Łomża and Suwałki into Zakłady Piwowarskie.

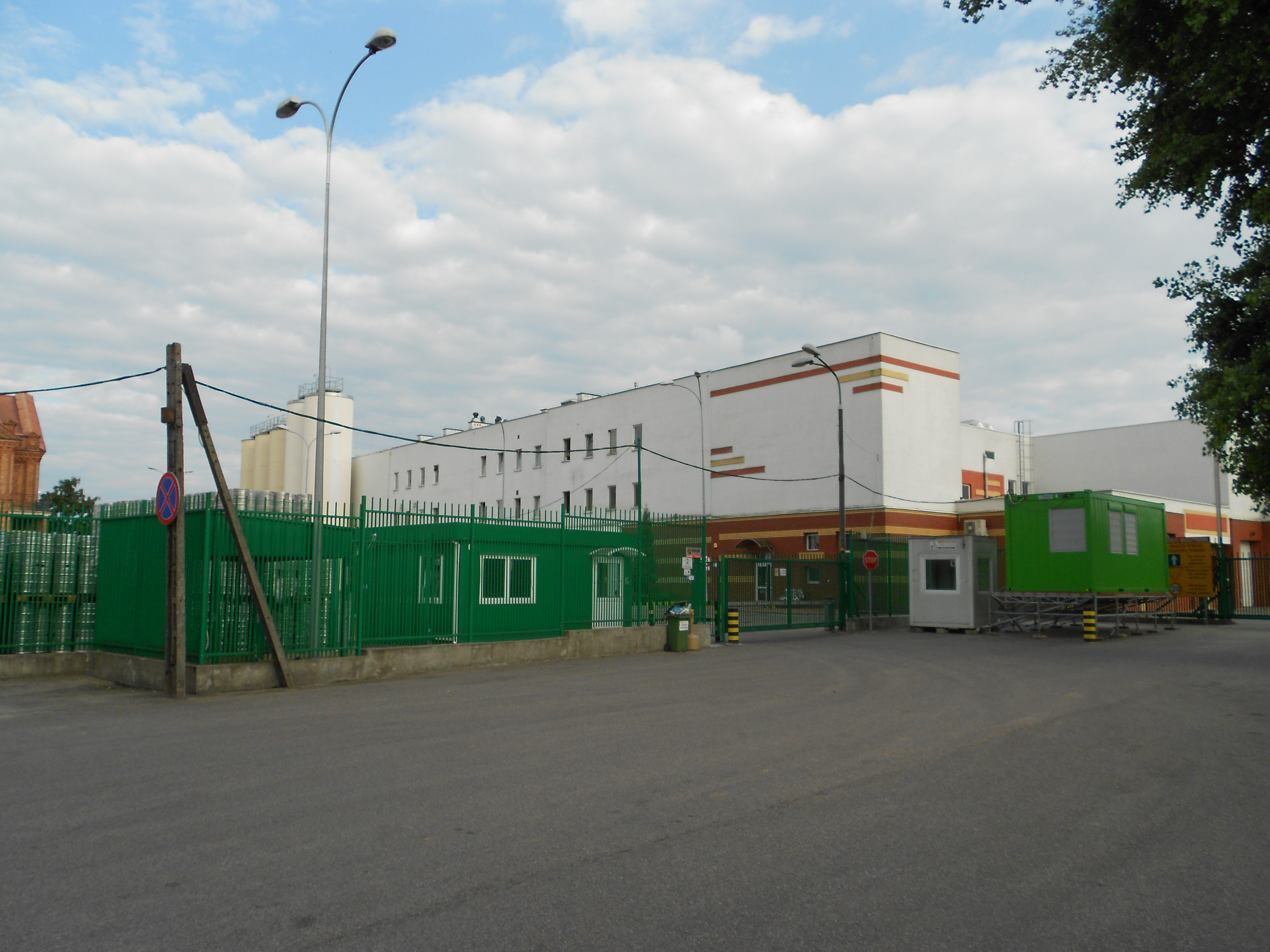
Building of Dojlidy Brewery

In December 1996, the majority shareholder of Plant Piwowarskie Sp. z o. o. Bialystok was a German beer company Binding Brauerei (in 2002 changed its name to Radeberger Gruppe AG) of Frankfurt. In March 1997, the plant name was changed to Dojlidy Sp. z o. o.. In the years 1997–1999 carried out a thorough modernization of the brewery.

On February 4, 2003, KP SA acquired a majority stake Dojlidy Brewery. Currently, the brewery no longer manufactures any beer except Dojlidy.

== Brands ==
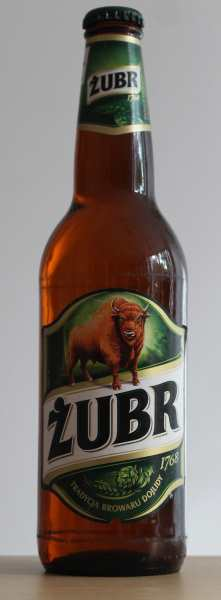
Żubr

- Dojlidy Classic
- Dojlidy Herbowe
- Dojlidy Jakt
- Dojlidy Karmel
- Dojlidy Magnat
- Dojlidy Mocne
- Dojlidy Porter
- Dojlidy Złote
- Dojlidy Pils
- Dojlidy Żubr

== See also ==
- Polish beer
- Żubr (beer)
- Kompania Piwowarska (Tyskie)
