= Kompania Piwowarska =

Polish brewing company

Coordinates: 52.3851°N 16.9976°E

- Industry: Brewing
- Founded: May 4, 1999; 27 years ago
- Headquarters: Poznań, Poland
- Products: Beer
- Brands: Tyskie; Lech; Dojlidy
- Revenue: 1,738,000,000 (2018)
- Net income: 191,000,000 (2018)
- Number of employees: 2,711 (2018)
- Parent: SABMiller (2009-17); Asahi Breweries (2017-)
- Website: kp.pl

Kompania Piwowarska is a Polish brewing group based in Poznań, established in 1999. Since 2017 it has been owned by Asahi Breweries. Kompania Piwowarska currently has three breweries: Lech Browary Wielkopolski in Poznań, Tyskie Browary Książęce in Tychy and Browar Dojlidy in Białystok. Tyskie Browary Książęce (Princely Brewery Tychy), one of the oldest breweries in Europe, was founded in 1629.

The three breweries have a total capacity of 15.1 million hectolitres.

The company was owned by SABMiller from 2009 to 2017. As part of the agreements made with regulators before Anheuser-Busch InBev was allowed to acquire SABMiller in 2016, it was announced on December 13, 2016, that Kompania Piwowarska would be sold to Asahi Breweries of Japan.

== Major brands ==
Kompania Piwowarska currently controls 45% of the Polish beer market.

=== Lech ===
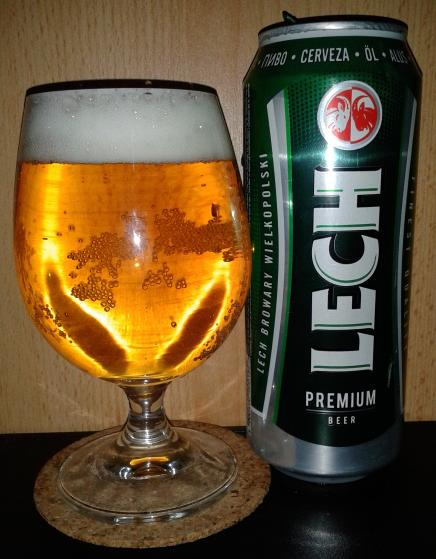
Lech Premium

The main Lech brands are Lech Premium a 5.0% abv pale lager, Lech Pils 5.5% pale lager Lech controls 8% of the Polish beer market. The Poznań brewery brews Dębowe Mocne (Oak Strong), which is 7%. Currently produced types are "Lech Premium", "Lech Pils"

=== Tyskie ===
Tyskie logo

Tyskie is one of the best selling brands of beer in Poland, with around 18% of the Polish market. Tyskie also has a world distribution. The main brands are Tyskie Gronie, a 5.0% pale lager,

=== Dojlidy ===
The main Dojlidy Brewery brand is the 6% pale lager, Żubr (European bison).

== Brands produced in Poland ==
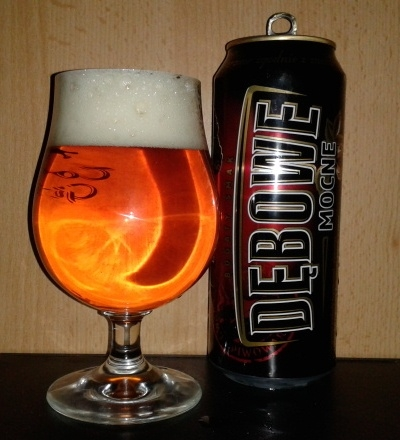
A can and glass of Dębowe Mocne

Brands produced by Kompania Piwowarska
Brand of Beer	Alcohol^{%}	Type
Tyskie Gronie	5.5	pale lager
Tyskie Klasyczne	5.0	pale lager
Tyskie z tanka	5.5	pale lager
Lech Premium	5.0	pale lager
Lech Pils	5.5	pale lager
Lech Free	0.5	non-alcoholic beer
Lech Shandy	2.6	shandy-style beer
Żubr	6.0	pale lager
Żubr Ciemnozłoty	6.9	pale lager
Dębowe Mocne	7.0	strong lager
Wojak Jasny Pełny	5.0	pale lager
Wojak Mocny	7.0	strong lager
Wojak Super Mocny	9.0	extra strong lager
Książęce Złote Pszeniczne	4.9	pale lager with wheat malt
Książęce Czerwony Lager	4.9	vienna lager
Książęce Ciemne Łagodne	4.1	dark lager
Książęce Korzenne Aromatyczne	5.0	winter beer
Redd's Apple	4.5	pale lager
Redd's Red	4.5	fruit beer
Redd's Sun	4.5	fruit beer
Redd's Cranberry	4.5	fruit beer
Redd's Grapefruit i Ananas	4.5	fruit beer
Gingers Beer Classic	4.1	fruit beer
Gingers Cinnamon	4.1	fruit beer
Gingers Lime	4.5	fruit beer
Grolsch	5.0	pale lager
Pilsner Urquell	4.4	pilsner
Peroni Nastro Azzurro	5.1	pale lager
Miller Genuine Draft	4.7	pale lager
