= Tyskie =

Polish beer

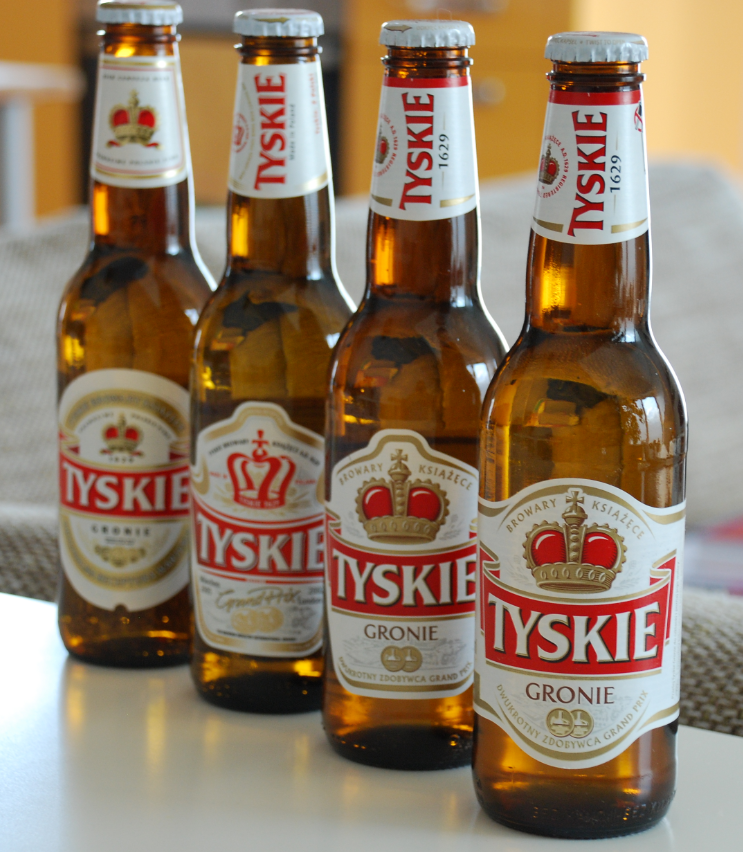
- Former and current design of Tyskie Gronie pale-lager beer bottle
- Type: Beer
- Manufacturer: Tyskie Browary Książęce (Tychy Princely Brewery)
- Distributor: Asahi Group Holdings
- Origin: Poland
- Introduced: 1629; 397 years ago
- Alcohol by volume: 5.2 % (5% in the UK)
- Style: Pale lager
- Website: www.tyskie.pl

Tyskie (Polish: [ˈtɨskʲɛ]) is a Polish beer brand originating from Tyskie Browary Książęce, a brewery in the Upper Silesian town of Tychy founded in 1629. It is produced by Kompania Piwowarska, a Polish brewing group that has been part of Asahi Breweries since 2017.

== Beers ==
The main brands are Tyskie Gronie (pale lager).

== History ==
Beer has been produced in Tychy continuously for almost 400 years. From 1629, the brewery, then known in German as the "Fürstliche Brauerei Tichau" (Princely Brewery Tychy), was in the ownership of the noble House of Promnitz. From 1861, the brewery became known as the "Fürstliche Brauerei in Tichau" (Princely Brewery in Tychy) and came under the management of Hans von Hochberg from the German princely (German Fürsten) House of Pless. Between 1918 and 1939, the brewery merged with neighbouring competing companies, but came under provisional administration of the Polish state intermittently from 1934 due to unpaid taxes. During World War II, the brewery was put under the management of the occupying authorities.

== Types of beer produced ==
In its beginnings, the brewery produced three kinds of beer: mailings, yeast and tableware. Only the high quality beer was intended for sale, and the other two were a beer allowance drunk mainly by brewers and their families. In the early nineteenth century the brewery produced only two beverages: beer and Bavarian malt, both top-fermenting. Bavarian malt with a classical composition, saturated color was brown, sweet, and low-hopped. The standard favorite was the dark niskoekstraktowe, weak and only for immediate consumption. After the expansion of the brewery in the nineteenth century and the introduction of bottom-fermenting, they started to produce Tyskie lager, a relatively short Bavarian beer. The first beers were light and were sold under the Książęce brand. In the interwar period, popular brands from Tyskie were the Książęce Tyskie Pilsen (Princely Tychy Pilsner), the Książęce Tyskie Export, the Książęce Tyskie Beer full, and Tyskie Porter.

== Export ==
Tyskie sales accounted for 18% of the Polish market in 2009. Tyskie also has a large export distribution through its parent company. The main export brands are Tyskie Gronie, a 5.0% pale lager Tyskie Gronie is 5.2% ABV in produced by Tychy Brewery Princely.

Tyskie Gronie (abv 5.0%) is also brewed and canned by the Grolsche brewery in Enschede, Netherlands, for the UK market (imported by Asahi UK Ltd).

== Marketing ==
Tyskie bottle labels depict a royal crown to commemorate John III Sobieski king of Poland, who was born in 1629, the same year the family von Promnitz established a brewery in the town of Tychy.

== Tourism ==
In 2004, the Tyskie Brewing Museum was founded on the brewery premises in Tychy.

== Honors ==
In 2002, Tyskie Gronie won The Brewing Industry International Awards, receiving the Gold Medal and Grand Prix awards.

In 2005 in Munich at a global beer fair hosted by Drink Tec, Tyskie again received the Grand Prix.

In 2011 Tyskie received the Gold Medal du Monde Selection – International Institute for Quality Selections.

== See also ==
- Polish beer
- Tychy Brewery
