= Beer in France =

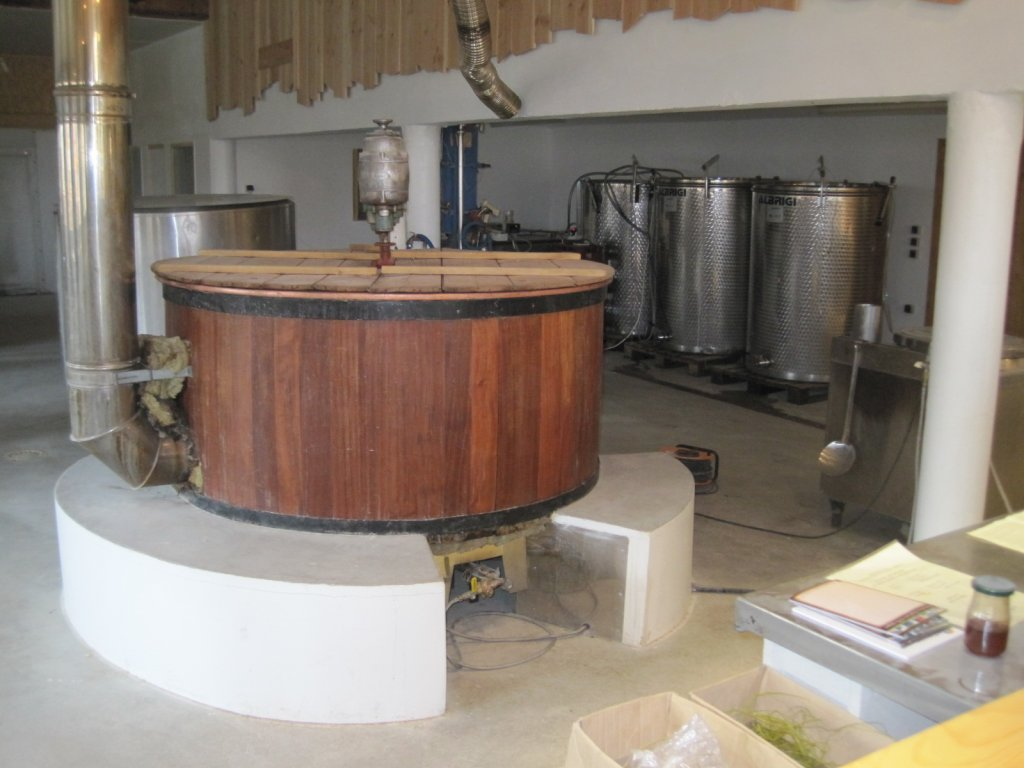
Franche brewery, Jura

France is a major consumer and producer of beer, particularly in its northern and eastern regions. Most beer sold in France is pilsner lager, mass-produced by major breweries which control over 90% of the market, although there are also traditional beer styles, such as top-fermented Bière de Garde, and a number of microbreweries.

== History ==
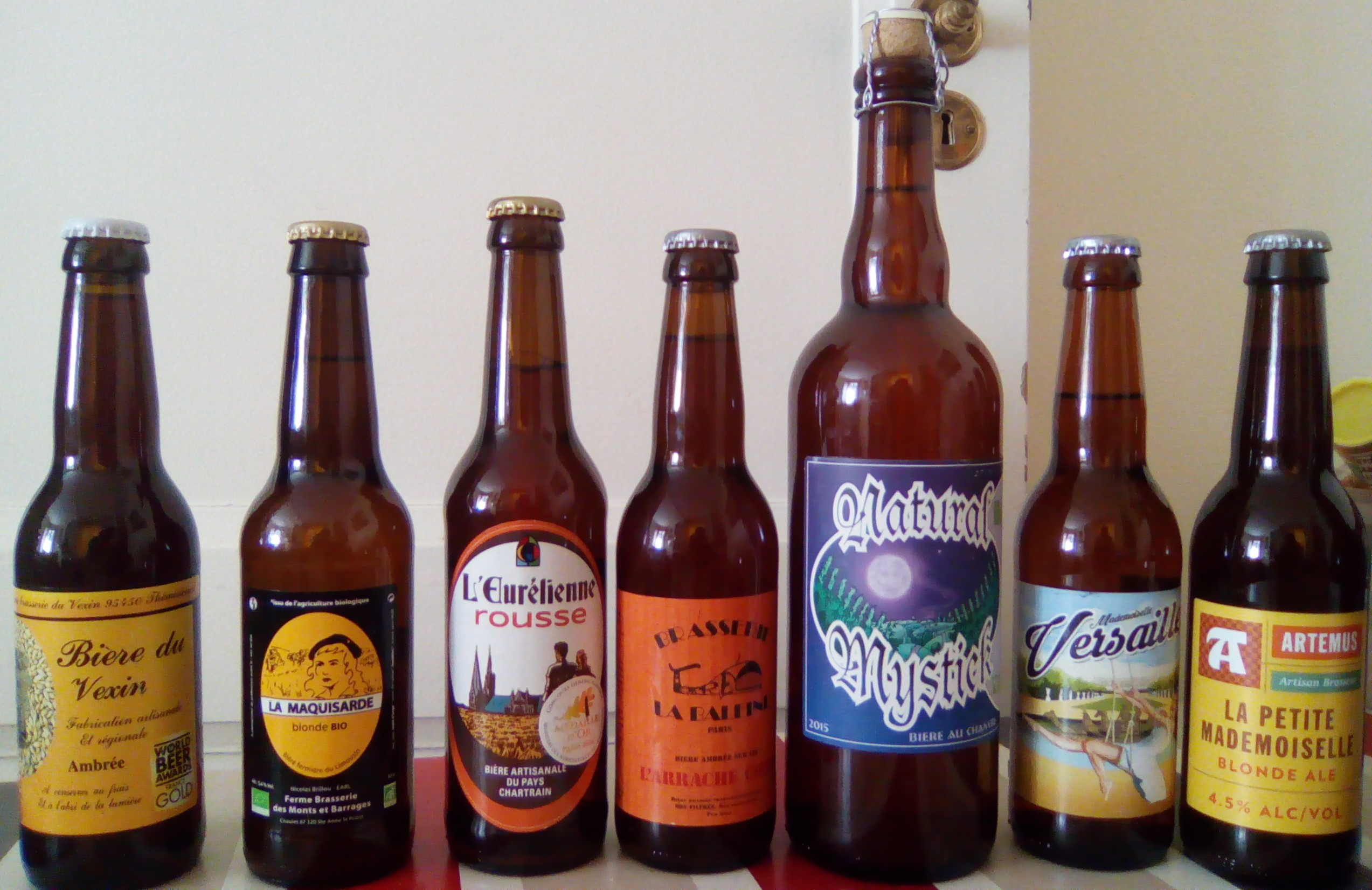
Bottles of beers produced by French microbreweries

Before industrialisation, most beer was brewed in small rural breweries, which catered to the needs of the local residents. In the early 20th century there were over a thousand breweries in France. As rural population declined, these breweries almost disappeared and along with them the tradition and diversity of the regional beers, which started to be replaced by larger urban ones. Among the things that caused most impact are:

- Industrialisation, which drove people to cities
- Decline of the coal-mining industry, which employed a large number of people in northern France and thus provided a significant market for local beer
- The two World Wars, which hit the French countryside very hard (not only the population but sometimes the breweries directly, which had their equipment turned into ammunition).

In the last decades the interest in beer was renewed and many new breweries, particularly microbreweries, have appeared.

== Regions ==
=== Alsace-Lorraine ===
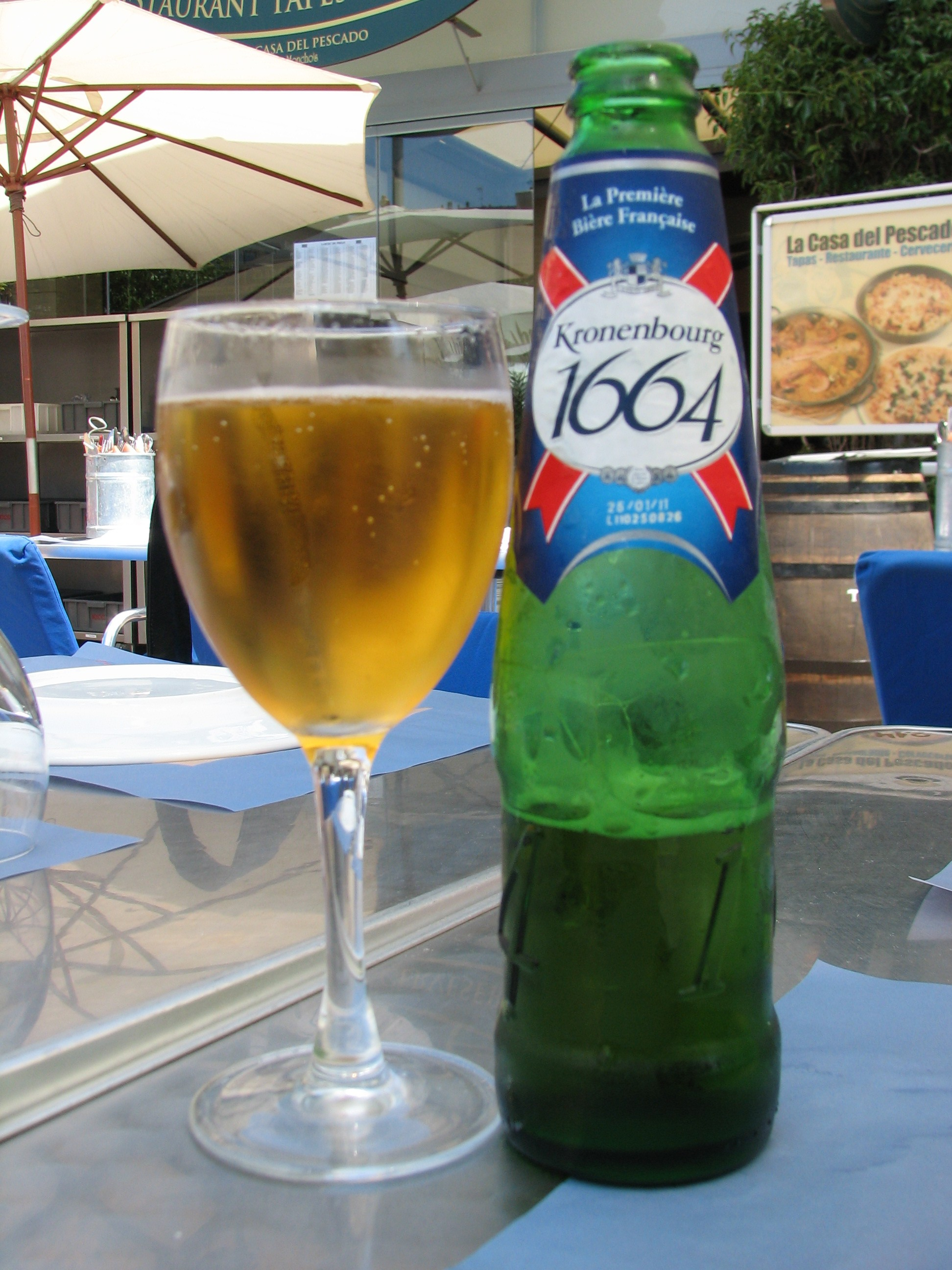
Kronenbourg 1664

The Alsace-Lorraine region has had a turbulent history, changing hands several times between Germany and France. Currently, the French part is the main beer-producing région of France, thanks primarily to breweries in and near Strasbourg. These include those of Licorne (Karlsbräu), Kronenbourg, l'Espérance (Heineken International), Meteor, Schutzenberger and Champigneulles (near Nancy).

Hops are grown in Kochersberg and in northern Alsace.

There are also a number of microbreweries in the area.

=== Lille and Nord-Pas-de-Calais ===
The Nord-Pas-de-Calais area, also known as French Flanders, has longstanding cultural ties to Belgium, and a common brewing heritage.

Pelforth is a French brewery founded in 1914 in Mons-en-Barœul by three Lillois brewers. Among connoisseurs, it is "famous for its strong speciality beers". It was originally called Pelican, after a dance popular at the time. Production was stopped during World War II, restarting in 1950. The brewery name was changed in 1972 to Pelforth. It was bought by Française de Brasserie in 1986, which was acquired by Heineken International in 1988. The brewery produces the Pelforth brand of beers: Pelforth, an ale, was first brewed in 1935 using two different types of malt and English yeast. The name came from "Pel" for pelican, "forte" for strong, because it contains a lot of malt (43 kg/hL), and the h added to give it an English feel. In addition to the Blonde (5.8% abv) and Brune (6.5% abv), Pelforth Amber (6% abv) was introduced in 2003.

There are a number of small breweries in the area, mostly brewing Bière de Garde. La Choulotte and Les Brasseurs de Gayant brew Abbey beers among other styles. Brasserie de Saint-Sylvestre brews seasonal beers as well as Bière de Garde; the Terken brewery does likewise.

The original Trois Brasseurs ("Three Brewers") brewpub is in Lille.

=== Breton and Celtic brewing ===
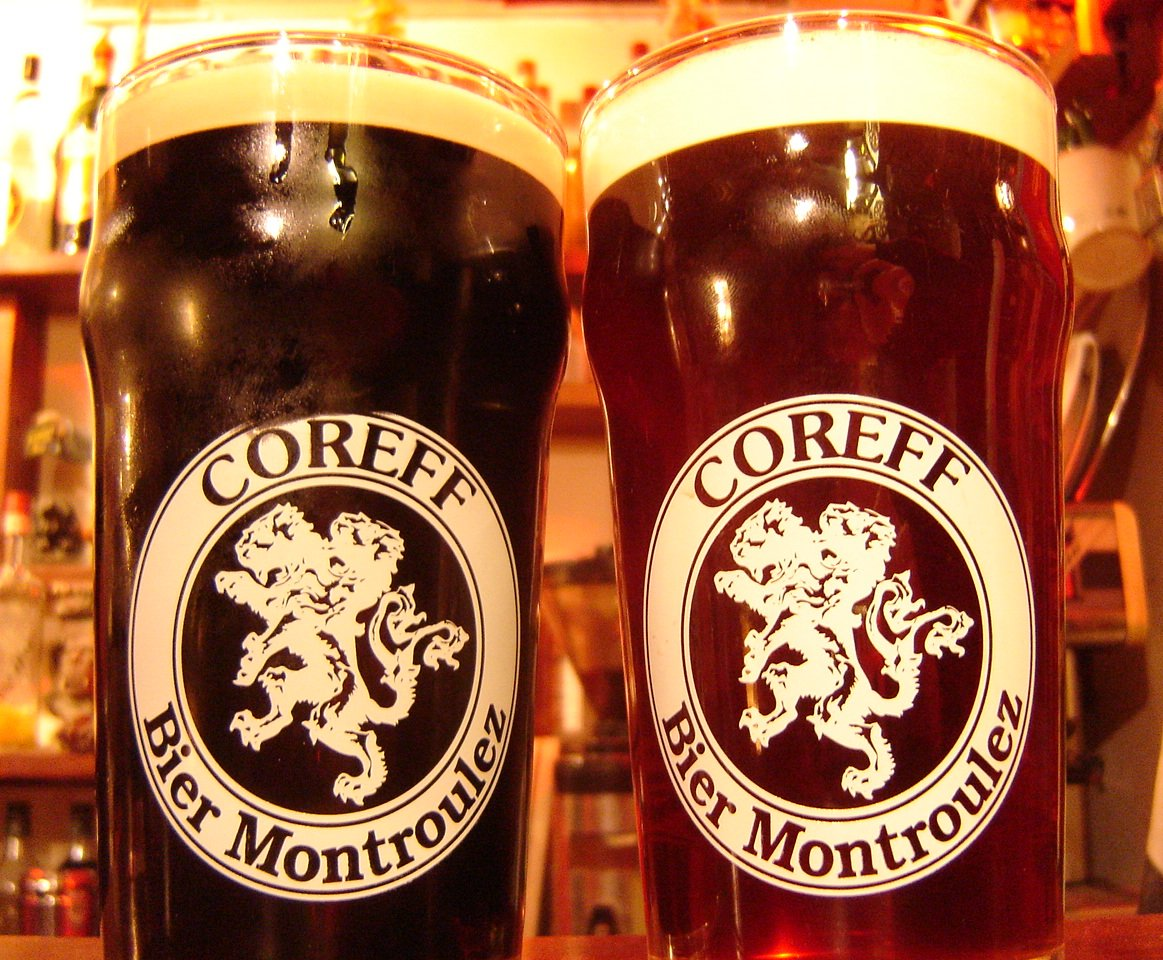
A Coreff porter and a Coreff pale ale

Brittany has a long beer brewing tradition, tracing its roots back to the seventeenth century; Young artisanal brewers are keeping a variety of beer types alive, such as Coreff de Morlaix. Brasserie Lancelot produces a number of specialities, including Telenn Du, a beer made, like Breton pancakes, from buckwheat.

== Speciality beer styles ==
=== Bière de Garde ===
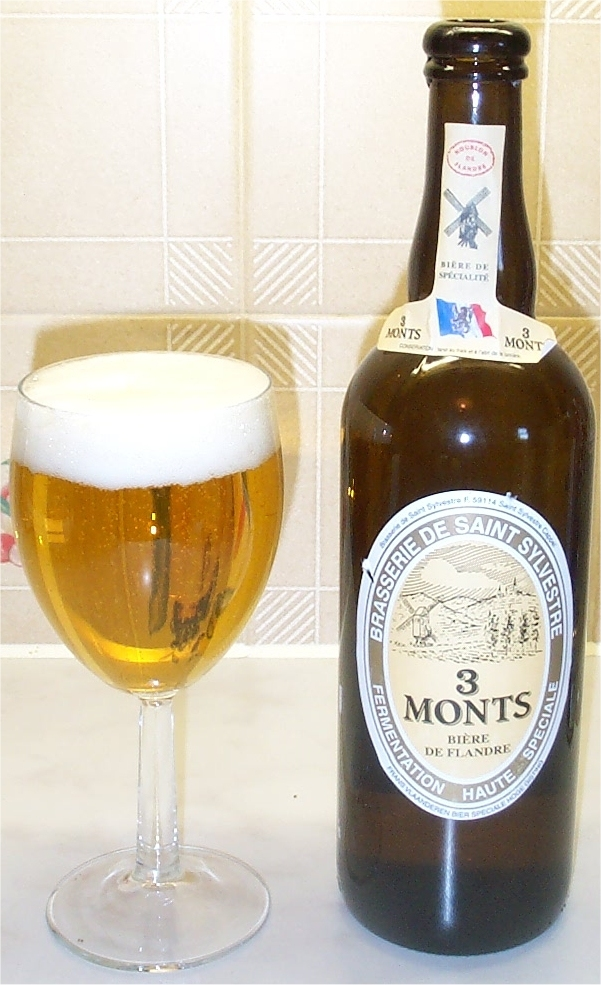
3 Monts, a Bière de Garde

Bière de Garde ("beer for keeping") is a strong pale ale or keeping beer traditionally brewed in the Nord-Pas-de-Calais region of France. These beers were originally brewed in farmhouses during the winter and spring, to avoid unpredictable problems with the yeast during the summertime. Farmhouse production is now supplemented by commercial production, although most Bière de Garde brewers are small businesses.

Typically, beers of this tradition are of a copper colour or golden colour, and as the name suggests the origins of this style lie in the tradition that it was matured/cellared for a period of time once bottled (and most sealed with a cork), to be consumed later in the year, akin to a Belgian Saison. Most varieties are top-fermented and unfiltered, although bottom-fermented or filtered versions exist. Particularly authentic products, using only regional ingredients, are entitled to use the Appellation d'origine contrôlée, Pas de Calais/Region du Nord.

Some of the better known brands include Brasserie de Saint-Sylvestre, Trois Monts (8.5%abv), Brasseurs Duyck, Jenlain (7.5%abv), Brasserie Castelain, Ch'Ti Blonde/Ambrée and Brasserie La Choulette, Ambrée (7.5%abv).

=== Monastic brewing ===
A number of beers with monastic connections are made in Northern France.

- The French abbey of Sainte Marie du Mont des Cats has been selling trappist beer since June 16th, 2011. The abbey has no brewery at this time and does not plan to build one in the near future, for reasons of cost and brewing skills. They have not ruled out building their own brewery in the more distant future. The trappist beer sold by this abbey is produced by the brewery of Chimay and does not carry the "authentic trappist product" logo yet.
- Brasserie La Choulette's Abbaye de Vaucelles 7.5% ABV beer is described as being on the Bière de Garde style.
- Saint Landelin is the brand name of a range of ales brewed by Les Brasseurs de Gayant.

=== Organic beer ===
There are a number of organic beers, such as Castelain's Jade.

=== Seasonal beers ===
Seasonal beers are chiefly represented by March beers and Christmas beers.

==== March beers ====
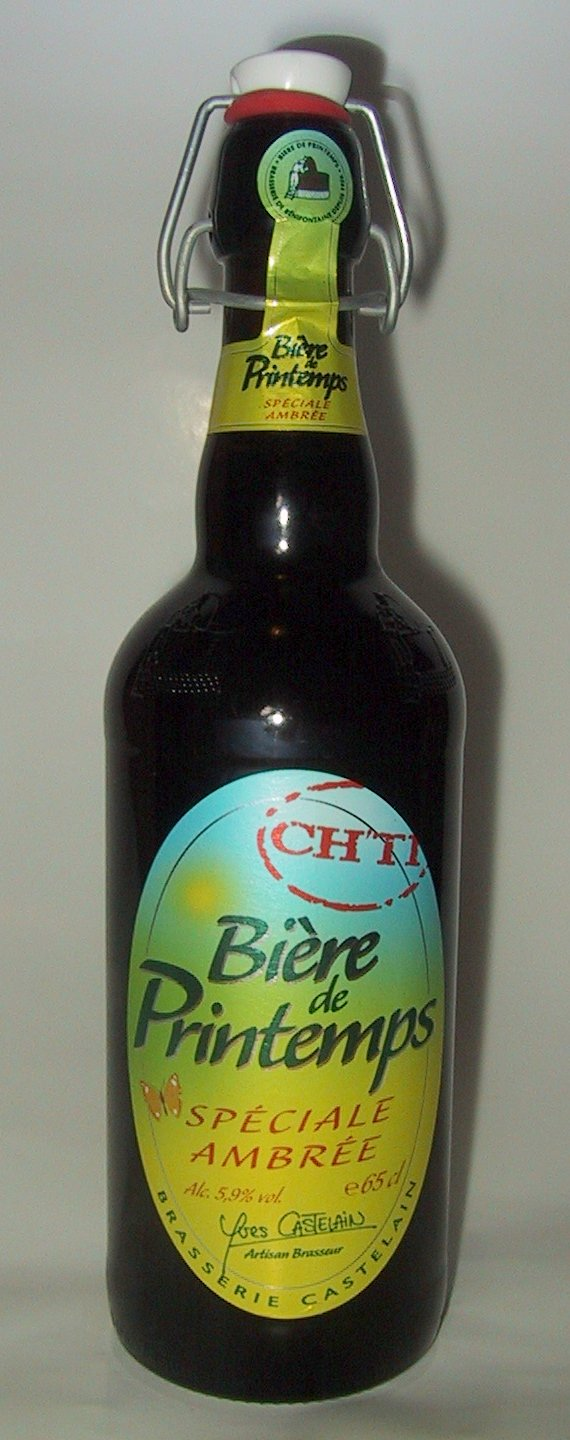
Ch'ti Bière de Printemps

French brewers market bière de mars ("March beer"), or bière de printemps ("Spring beer") over the month of March. It is produced in limited quantity starting from a variety of barley sown in the previous spring, harvested the previous summer and brewed at the beginning of the winter. It is in general a top-fermented ale of moderate strength (4.5% to 5.5%). In contrast to German Märzen beers, it is less hopped (less bitter) and weaker, although it can be darker (often by addition of caramel or other colourants), and slightly spiced. German Märzen is also fermented with lager, not ale yeast.

==== Christmas beers ====
There is a long-standing tradition of brewing strong ales in October for consumption in December. French Bières de Noël are rich and strong winter warmers as in other European countries. They are usually top fermented ales.

=== Wheat beer ===
French wheat beers are made by a number of large and small brewers, and not seen as belonging to any particular tradition. Examples include: Blanc (5% ABV) from the giant Kronenbourg brewery, Brasserie Castelain, Ch'Ti Blanche, and Pietra Colomba Biere Blanche, with Corsican herbs.

=== Whisky beer ===
Whisky beer is one of more popular speciality styles, made with peat-smoked malt. The original was Adelscott Bière au Malt á Whisky, a 6.5% ABV lager from the Adelschoffen brewery in Alsace, which was launched in the 1980s. A darker Adelscott Noir is also brewed. Kronenbourg likewise brew Wel Scotch (6.2% ABV) with whisky malt. The Meteor Brewery's 8% ABV Mortimer is packaged like whisky, but actually classed as a Vienna lager. The foregoing are all Alsace-based, top-fermented brews; Amberley (7.3% ABV) is Pelforth's top-fermented whisky beer, from the Lille area.

=== Other styles ===
- The 12% ABV Bière du Démon (Beer of the Demon) by Les Brasseurs de Gayant is advertised as the strongest blonde beer in the world.
- La Bière Amoureuse (4.9% ABV, Fischer) contains supposedly aphrodisiac herbs.
- Pietra beer is a 6% ABV amber beer, brewed from a mix of malt and chestnut flour. Chestnuts have always been used in Corsica as a cereal, but it was necessary to carry out studies for many years to validate the qualities of chestnut flour. The high fermentability of chestnuts helps to maintain the beer's head and gives Pietra beer its golden colour.
- Fischer Desperados is a Tequila Beer, as is Les Brasseurs de Gayant Tequieros.
- George Killian's Biere Rousse, also known as Kylian, is an Irish red ale brewed by Pelforth near Lille.

== Outlets ==
=== Brewpubs ===
There is a chain of about 7 brewpubs called FrogPubs, which blend British and French traditions. ('Frog' is the English nickname for the French; two pubs are named The Frog & Rosbif – Rosbif or "roast beef" is the French nickname for the English). The pubs are decorated in a broadly British style, and serve a selection of ales, stouts and wheat beer.

There is also a chain of about 20 American style brewpub-restaurants operating under the name Les 3 Brasseurs (The Three Brewers), which extends outside the country.

=== Beer cafés ===
Establishments selling a wide selection of bottled and draught beers can be found in urban areas. An example is the Pub St Germain in the Latin Quarter of Paris. Some beer cafés are Belgian-themed with cuisine to match.

=== Beer festivals ===
Beer festivals are held in Schiltigheim (August) and Felletin (July).

== Market ==
=== Barley, Malt and Hops ===
France is the largest producer of barley in Europe (3.5 million tons in 2010) and has been the world's largest malt exporter in the last 30 years, having exported 78% of the national production (1.6 million tons) in 2011, which represents 23% of the world market. Hop production is modest, at 800 tons in 2010.

=== Market ===
According to the French Brewers Association beer market in France represents EUR 12.8 billion and employs 71,500 people.

In 2010 France produced 16.3 million hl (9th in Europe) and consumption reached 19.7 million hl, representing a 1.7% decrease from 2009. This represents 30l per capita, one of the lowest in Europe.

=== Comparison with other countries ===
According to the List of countries by alcohol consumption, which uses data from the WHO Global Status Report on Alcohol and Health 2011, France ranks 64th in terms of beer consumption per capita (compared to 16th for alcohol overall). In absolute terms, at 1.7 million liters, France ranks 16th in beer production.

=== Beer vs. other alcoholic drinks ===
Overall alcohol consumption is down 25% since 1960 (17.9 L alcohol/inhabitant in 1961 compared to 10.5 L in 2008) and beer currently represents 16% of the total.

Similar data is shown by the World Health Organization Global Status Report on Alcohol 2004, which indicates a huge decline in total alcohol consumption by adults (15+) in France between 1961 and 2005 but beer consumption was relatively stable, wine being impacted the most. In 2005 beer represented 17% of the total alcohol consumption (compared to 62% for wine and 20% for spirits).

=== Sales by style ===
Although the market as a whole saw a decline, the consumption of special beers was up 5.6% in 2010 and they represent 70% of the market value.

=== Sales by outlet ===
Overall beer consumption was down 14% between 1991 and 2010 but sales outside home were the most impacted, going down 53%, while supermarket sales increased 6.5% in the same period. In 2010 supermarkets (GMS - magasins de détail) sales went down 1.1% (in terms of volume) and cafés, hotels and restaurants (CHR - cafés, hôtels et restaurants) sales dropped 3.5%.

== See also ==
- Beer and breweries by region
- Brasserie
