= List of beer styles =

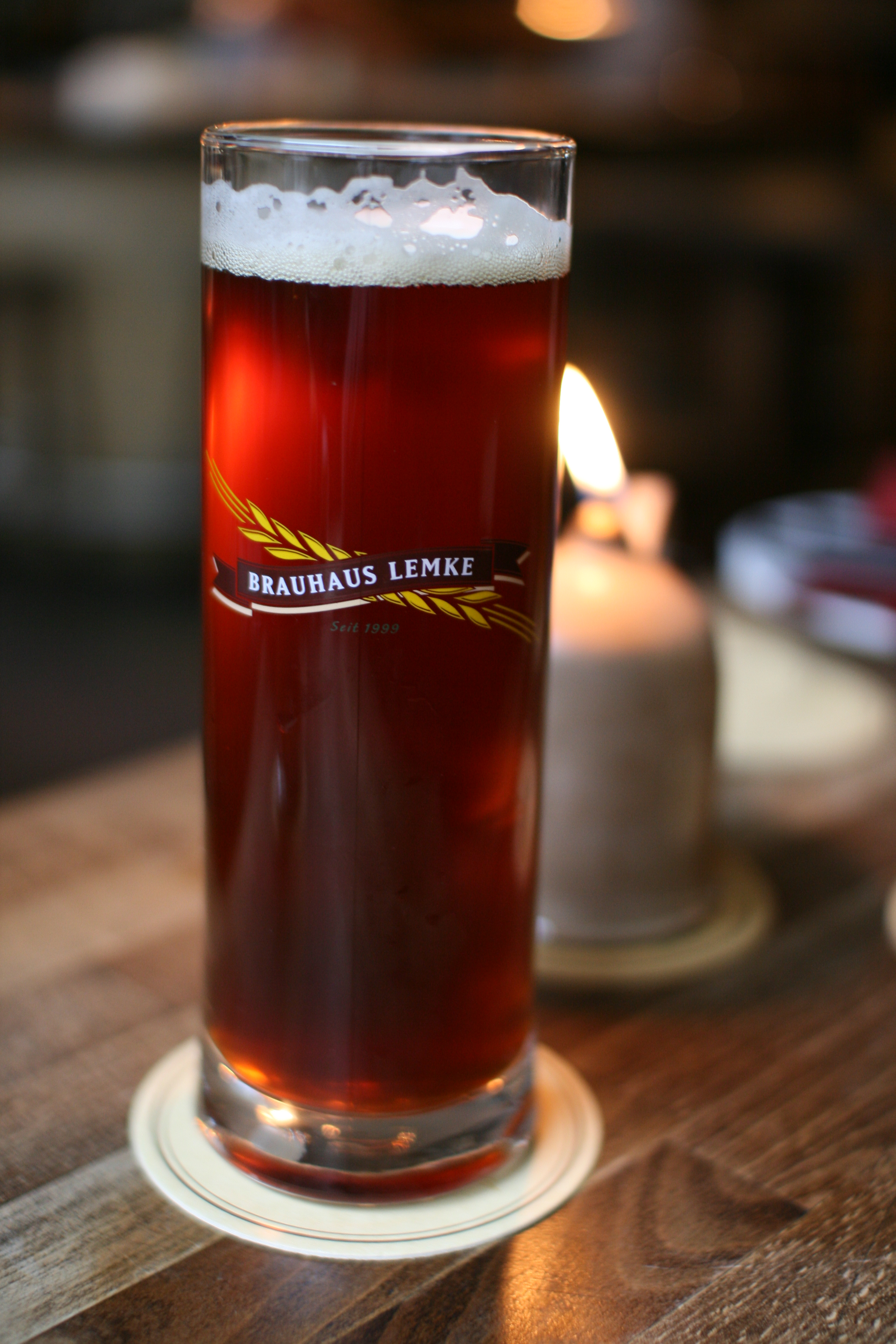
Dunkel beer, a German dark lager

Beer style is a term used to differentiate and categorize beers by various factors, including appearance, flavour, ingredients, production method, history, or origin. The term beer style and the structuring of world beers into defined categories is largely based on work done by writer Michael James Jackson in his 1977 book The World Guide To Beer. Fred Eckhardt furthered Jackson's work, publishing The Essentials of Beer Style in 1989.

There is no universally agreed list of beer styles, as different countries and organisations have different sets of criteria. Organisers of beer competitions such as the Campaign for Real Ale's (CAMRA) Champion Beer of Britain, the Beer Judge Certification Program (BJCP) local homebrewing competitions, the Brewers Association's World Beer Cup, and the Brewing Industry International Awards have categories in which beers are judged. The categories are varied and include processes or ingredients not usually regarded as defining beer styles in themselves, such as cask ale or gluten-free beer.

Beer terms such as ale or lager cover a wide variety of beer styles, and are better thought of as broad categories of beer styles. A number of ethnic beers, such as chhaang and cauim, are generally not included on beer style groupings.

== Classic styles ==
Term	Michael Jackson	Roger Protz	Brewers Association	CAMRA	BJCP
Altbier	Altbier	Altbier	German-Style Altbier		Altbier
Amber ale	Amber ale		American-Style Amber/Red Ale		American Amber Ale
Barley wine	Barley wine	Barley wine	British-Style Barley Wine Ale; American-Style Barley Wine Ale	Barley Wine	English Barleywine; American Barleywine
Berliner Weisse	Berliner Weisse	Berliner Weisse	Berliner-Style Weisse		Berliner Weisse
Bière de Garde	Bière de Garde	Bière de garde	French-Style Bière de Garde		Bière de Garde
Bitter	Bitter	Bitter	Ordinary Bitter; Special or Best Bitter; Extra Special Bitter	Bitter	Ordinary Bitter; Best Bitter; Strong Bitter
Blonde Ale			Golden or Blonde Ale; Belgian-Style Blonde Ale		Blonde Ale
Bock	Bok, Bock	Bock	Traditional German-Style Bock		Helles Bock/Dunkles Bock
Brown ale	Brown Ale	Brown ale	English-Style Brown Ale; American-Style Brown Ale		British Brown Ale; American Brown Ale; London Brown Ale (Historical)
California Common/Steam Beer	Steam beer	Steam beer	California Common Beer		California Common
Cream Ale	Cream Ale		American-Style Cream Ale		Cream Ale
Dortmunder Export	Export	Dortmunder Export	Dortmunder/European-Style Export		German Helles Exportbier
Doppelbock	Doppelbock / "Double" bock	Doppelbock	German-Style Doppelbock		Doppelbock
Dunkel	Dunkel/Dunkles	Dunkel	Münchner Dunkel; European-Style Dark Lager		Munich Dunkel
Dunkelweizen	Dunkel Weizen		South German-Style Dunkel Weizen		Dunkles Weissbier
Eisbock	Eisbock		German-Style Eisbock		Eisbock
Flanders red ale	Red beers		Belgian-Style Flanders Oud Bruin or Oud Red Ale		Flanders Red Ale
Golden/Summer ale			English-Style Summer Ale; Golden or Blonde Ale	Golden Ales	British Golden Ale
Gose			Leipzig-Style Gose; Contemporary Gose		Gose (Historical)
Gueuze	Gueuze	Gueuze	Belgian-Style Gueuze Lambic		Gueuze
Hefeweizen		Hefeweizen	South German-Style Hefeweizen		
Helles	Hell	Helles	Münchner (Munich)-Style Helles		Munich Helles
India pale ale	India Pale Ale (IPA)	India Pale Ales (IPA)	English-Style India Pale Ale; American-Style India Pale Ale; Session India Pale Ale; Imperial or Double India Pale Ale	India Pale Ale	English IPA; American IPA; Specialty IPA; Double IPA New England IPA Triple IPA
Kölsch	Kolsch	Kölsch	German-Style Kölsch		Kölsch
Lambic	Lambic	Lambic	Belgian-Style Lambic; Belgian-Style Fruit Lambic		Lambic; Fruit Lambic
Light ale	Light Ale			Light Bitters	
Maibock/Helles bock	Maibock	Maibock	German-Style Heller Bock/Maibock		Helles Bock
Malt liquor	Malt Liquor		American-Style Malt Liquor		
Mild	Mild	Mild ale	English-Style Pale Mild Ale; English-Style Dark Mild Ale	Mild	Dark Mild
Oktoberfestbier/Märzenbier	Marzen	Oktoberfest beers	German-Style Maerzen; German-Style Oktoberfest/Wiesn		Festbier; Märzen
Old ale	Old (Ale)	Old ale	Old Ale	Old Ale	Old Ale
Oud bruin	Brown Beers	Oud bruin	Belgian-Style Flanders Oud Bruin or Oud Red Ale		Oud Bruin
Pale ale	Pale Ale	Pale ale	Classic English-Style Pale Ale; American-Style Pale Ale; American-Style Strong Pale Ale; Belgian-Style Pale Ale; Australian-Style Pale Ale; International-Style Pale Ale	Pale Ale	American Pale Ale; Belgian Pale Ale
Pilsener/Pilsner/Pils	Pilsener/Pilsner/Pils	Pilsner	German-Style Pilsener; Bohemian-Style Pilsener; American-Style Pilsener; International-Style Pilsener		American Lager; International Pale Lager; Czech Pale Lager; Czech Premium Pale Lager; German Pils
Porter	Porter	Porter	Brown Porter; Robust Porter; American-Style Imperial Porter; Smoke Porter; Baltic-Style Porter	Porter	Baltic Porter; English Porter; American Porter; Pre-Prohibition Porter (Historical)
Red ale			Irish-Style Red Ale; American-Style Amber/Red Ale; Double Red Ale; Imperial Red Ale		Irish Red Ale
Roggenbier			German-Style Rye Ale		Roggenbier (Historical)
Saison	Saison	Saison	Classic French & Belgian-Style Saison; Specialty Saison		Saison
Scotch ale	Scotch Ale	Scotch ale	Scotch Ale	Scottish Beers	Wee Heavy
Stout	Sweet Stout; Dry Stout; Imperial Stout	Stout	Sweet Stout or Cream Stout; Oatmeal Stout; British-Style Imperial Stout; Classic Irish-Style Dry Stout; Export-Style Stout; American-Style Stout; American-Style Imperial Stout	Stout	Irish Stout; Irish Extra Stout; Sweet Stout; Oatmeal Stout; Tropical Stout; Foreign Extra Stout; American Stout; Imperial Stout
Schwarzbier	Schwarzbier		German-Style Schwarzbier		Schwarzbier
Vienna lager	Vienna		Vienna-Style Lager		Vienna Lager
Witbier	Witbier		Belgian-Style Witbier		Witbier
Weissbier	Weisse/Weissbier, Weizenbier		South German-Style Kristallweizen; German-Style Leichtes Weizen; South German-Style Bernsteinfarbenes Weizen		Weissbier
Weizenbock	Weizenbock		South German-Style Weizenbock		Weizenbock

== Hybrid and specialty styles ==
Term	Brewers Association	BJCP
Fruit beer	American-Style Fruit Beer; Fruit Wheat Beer; Belgian-Style Fruit Beer	Fruit Beer; Fruit and Spice Beer; Specialty Fruit Beer
Herb and spiced beer	Chili Pepper Beer; Chocolate or Cocoa Beer; Coffee Beer; Herb and Spice Beer	Spice, Herb, or Vegetable Beer; Autumn Seasonal Beer; Winter Seasonal Beer
Honey beer	Specialty Honey Beer	Alternative sugar beer
Rye Beer	Rye Beer	Alternative grain beer
Smoked beer	Smoke Beer	Classic Style Smoked Beer; Specialty Smoked Beer
Vegetable beer	Field Beer; Pumpkin Spice Beer; Pumpkin/Squash Beer	Spice, Herb, or Vegetable Beer
Wild beer	Brett Beer; Mixed-Culture Brett Beer; Wild Beer	Brett Beer; Mixed-Fermentation Sour Beer; Wild Specialty Beer
Wood-aged beer	Wood- and Barrel-Aged Beer; Wood- and Barrel-Aged Pale to Amber Beer; Wood- and Barrel-Aged Dark Beer; Wood- and Barrel-Aged Strong Beer; Wood- and Barrel-Aged Sour Beer	Wood-Aged Beer; Specialty Wood-Aged Beer

== Origin ==
An alternative approach is to categorize beers by the country or region from which they originated. Both the Brewers Association and the Beer Judge Certification Program (BJCP) group their beer styles in this way. Beers that originated in a particular country or region may be subsequently produced in other countries, e.g. British style ales are now brewed in North America.

Country or Region	Brewers Association	BJCP
Great Britain	British Origin Ale Styles	British Bitter; Brown British Beer; Scottish Ale; Dark British Beer; Strong British Ale
Ireland	Irish Origin Ale Styles	Irish Beer
North America	North American Origin Ale Styles; North American Origin Lager Styles	Standard American Beer; Pale American Ale; Amber and Brown American Ale; American Porter and Stout; Strong American Ale; American Wild Ale
Belgium	Belgian and French Origin Ale Styles	Belgian Ale; Strong Belgian Ale
Czech Republic		Czech Lager
France	Belgian and French Origin Ale Styles	
Germany	German Origin Ale Styles; European-Germanic Origin Lager Styles	German Wheat Beer
Europe		Pale Malty European Lager; Pale Bitter European Lager; Amber Malty European Lager; Amber Bitter European Lager; Dark European Lager; Strong European Beer; European Sour Ale
Other	Other Origin Ale Styles; Other Origin Lager Styles	International Lager; Pale Commonwealth Beer

== Other fermented drinks based on cereals ==
A number of ethnic beers or other fermented drinks based on cereals are generally not included on beer style groupings. They are included here for completeness.

- Bouza
- Boza
- Bozo
- Braggot, Also called bracket or brackett. Ingredients consist of honey and malted grains with spices or hops. Welsh origin (bragawd).
- Cauim
- Chhaang
- Chicha
- Gotlandsdricka
- Gruit
- Kvass
- Oshikundu
- Podpiwek
- Purl
- Sahti
- Sato (rice wine), also called lao hai (jug alcohol) when home-brewed in jugs
- Sulima, made by the Mosuo people in the Lijiang region of Yunnan, China

== See also ==
- Grisette (beer) – a farmhouse ale that originated on the border of Belgium and France

== Bibliography ==
- Michael Jackson's Great Beer Guide, Michael Jackson, ISBN 0-7894-5156-5
