= Grisette (beer) =

Beer variety from France and Belgium

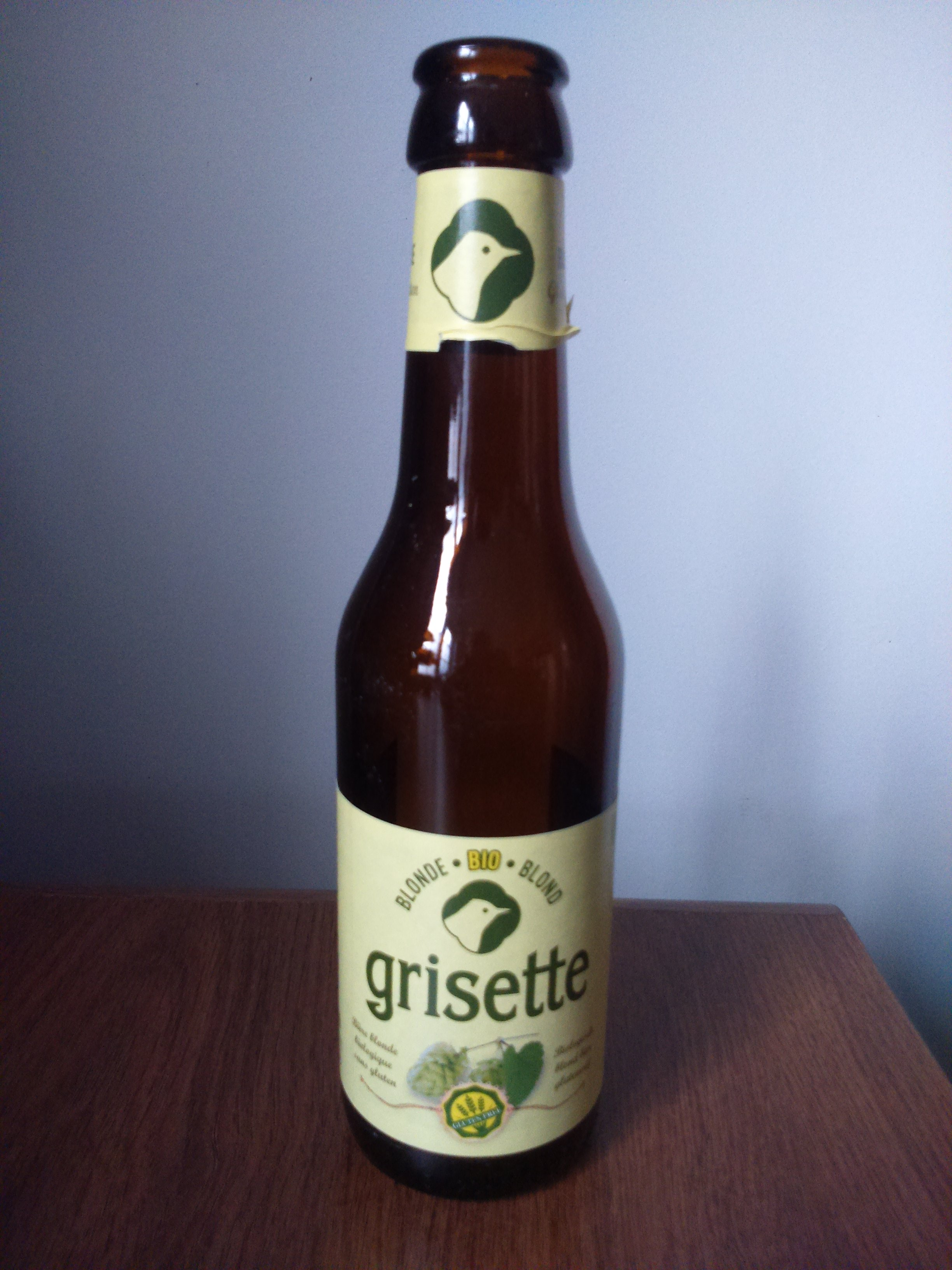
- Grisette Blond beer bottle, by St-Feuillien
- Type: Beer
- Region of origin: France and Belgium
- Related products: Farmhouse ales

A grisette is a variety of beer originating from the mining regions along the border of France and Belgium. It is a close relative of other farmhouse ales of the region including saisons and bières de garde, though unlike those beers, which were prevalent among agricultural workers, grisettes were consumed primarily by miners. The name, which means "little grey one", may come from the name of the local grey-colored stone or from the grey frocks worn by the women who served the beer in local pubs.

It is a low-alcohol beer that is light in body, with a noticeable tartness similar to other farmhouse ales and in some ways to the gose beers of Germany. As of 2016, only one Belgian brewery was still making the style in the traditional manner, though the American craft brewing industry has started producing several varieties, often working from historically researched recipes.

== See also ==
- List of beer styles
