= Jenlain =

- Commune
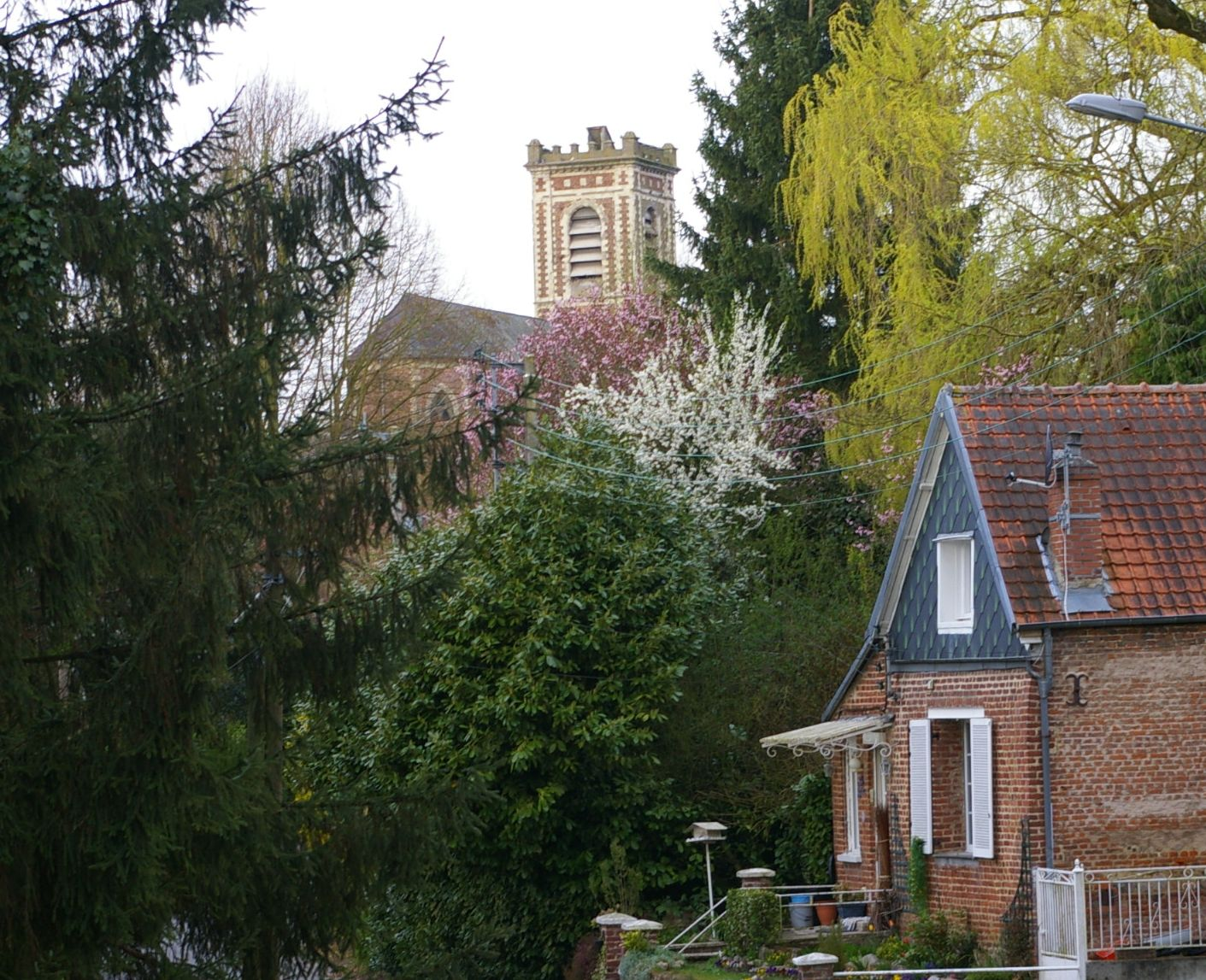
- The church in Jenlain

- Coat of arms
- Location of Jenlain
- Location within France Location within Hauts-de-France
- Coordinates: 50°18′46″N 3°37′49″E
- Country: France
- Region: Hauts-de-France
- Department: Nord
- Arrondissement: Avesnes-sur-Helpe
- Canton: Aulnoye-Aymeries
- Intercommunality: CC Pays de Mormal

Government
  - Mayor (2020–2026): Johan Dremaux
- Area^{1}: 5.91 km^{2} (2.28 sq mi)
- Elevation: 94 m (308 ft)
- Highest elevation: 116 m (381 ft)
- Lowest elevation: 54 m (177 ft)
- Population (2023): 1,115
  - Density: 189/km^{2} (489/sq mi)
- Time zone: UTC+01:00 (CET)
  - Summer (DST): UTC+02:00 (CEST)
- INSEE/Postal code: 59323 /59144
- ^{1} French Land Register data, which excludes lakes, ponds, glaciers > 1 km^{2} (0.386 sq mi or 247 acres) and river estuaries.

Jenlain (French pronunciation: [ʒɑ̃lɛ̃]) is a commune in the Nord department in northern France.

Jenlain is located 10 kilometres (6 mi) away from Valenciennes and 6 kilometres (4 mi) from Le Quesnoy. Inhabitants are called Jenlinois. A Bière de Garde, Jenlain, is brewed there.

== Heraldry ==
Arms of Jenlain	The arms of Jenlain are blazoned : Argent, a chevron sable between 3 trefoils vert.

== See also ==
- Communes of the Nord department
