= Vennture Brew Company =

Brewery in Milwaukee, Wisconsin, US

Coordinates: 43.0605°N 87.9826°W

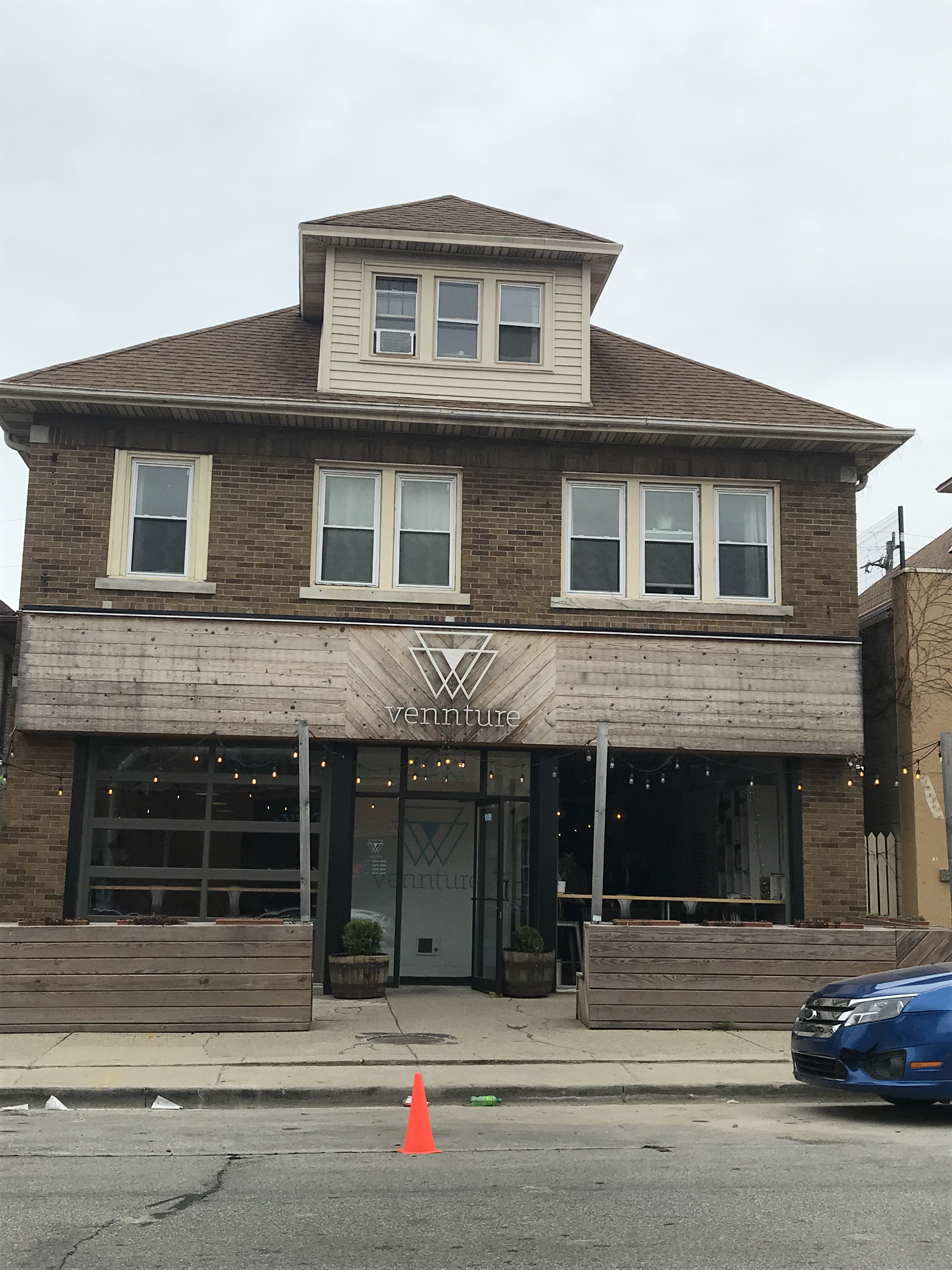
Vennture Brew's original location on North Ave. in Milwaukee

Vennture Brew Company is a microbrewery and coffee shop in Milwaukee, Wisconsin, United States. Vennture was opened in 2018 by three photographers who turned their hobby projects in coffee and beer into a business. In 2022, Yelp listed them as the best brewery in the state of Wisconsin. Headquartered in a former hardware store, they are known for their "The Heights" saison. It is one of a small minority of US breweries that is partly or wholly Black-owned.

== History ==
=== Founding ===
Vennture Brew Company was founded by Simon McConico, Robert Gustafson, and Jake Rohde, all photographers linked by a preexisting friendship. Their inspiration for a combined specialty coffee shop and brewery came while on trips to the US states of Colorado, Minnesota, Illinois, Michigan, and elsewhere in Wisconsin. They learned that the two beverages share similar clientele despite being primarily consumed at different times of the day.

McConico, Gustafson, and Rohde's experiences flowed into the unusual spelling of "venture", with two n's, and the company's Venn diagram-esque logo. The three wanted their work to exist at the intersection of "coffee, beer, and community".

To create the business, the three owners brought their experience in hobby projects: Rohde had become consumed with the intricacies of roasting coffee, while McConico and Gustafson had been homebrewing for years. Transitioning to a commercial scale required a lengthy business plan, and to learn the fine details of running a hospitality business McConico took a job at a nearby taproom.

As of 2022, Vennture is part of the less-than one percent of US breweries to be wholly or partly Black-owned. McConico told Milwaukee Business Journal in 2018:

Traditionally, beer and coffee are both very white; beer specifically, very white and male. [Vennture] tears down some of the boundaries and the preconceived ideas of what these drinks are. Hopefully, it provides space and opportunity for people who are not the same to gather. There's not a lot of places in this area specifically where people can just go and hang out.

Rohde left Vennture in late 2022 or early 2023.

=== Operations ===
External media

Images
- Owners Rob Gustafson, Simon McConico and Jake Rohde, c. 2018, via OnMilwaukee

Video
- Vennture Brew owners discuss their motivation for starting the business, February 9, 2017 via YouTube

Vennture opened in July 2018, supported by $22,000 of funding raised in a Kickstarter campaign. They were the first company in the area to offer both coffee and beer options.

In 2022, Yelp named it as the top brewery in the state of Wisconsin. By then, it had become part of a slew of breweries located along a North Avenue corridor in Milwaukee and nearby Wauwatosa.

The company began selling food sourced from Cranky Al's, a nearby restaurant, in 2023. As of the same year, the company's overall sales were divided roughly evenly between coffee and beer. However, while they could continue to increase their coffee roasting, their brewing system was operating at maximum capacity. They addressed this dilemma by purchasing Biloba Brewing in 2024.

== Locations ==
=== Milwaukee ===
Vennture's first location is in Milwaukee, Wisconsin, at 5519 North Avenue. The location straddles the city's Uptown Crossing and Washington Heights neighborhoods; news sources have placed it in both. As of 2018, the owners McConico, Gustafson, and Rohde all lived within seven blocks of the building.

McConico, Gustafson, and Rohde leased the space in February 2017 and converted it to its present use over 18 months. Their modifications included adding a five-barrel brewing system into the store's basement. The location was previously divided into two storefronts that contained various businesses over time, including a hardware store.

The primary colors used inside are blue and white, and the bar is constructed from upcycled hardwood floors. Milwaukee Magazine has described the place as "a bright, welcoming spot ... with a friendly, and family friendly, neighborhood vibe." It can hold about 50 people.

=== Brookfield ===
Vennture Brew opened their second location in Brookfield, Wisconsin, on March 16, 2024. The building, situated at 2970 North Brookfield Road, was previously the home of Biloba Brewing. It is about 1,500 square feet (140 m^{2}) large with the ability to hold up to 150 people. In early 2023, Vennture's ownership told the Milwaukee Business Journal that they were open to expanding, as they had no additional brewing capacity. An existing friendship with Biloba's retiring owners provided Vennture with what they called the "right opportunity" at the "right time" to build upon what Biloba had already accomplished.

== Beer ==
Vennture's flagship beer is called "The Heights," a table saison named after the neighborhood in which the brewery resides. It has been brewed since the shop opened. On Vennture Brew's opening day, six beers were available on tap, along with coffee- and espresso-based drinks as well as tea sourced from a company in Madison, Wisconsin.

== See also ==
- List of breweries in Wisconsin
