= Stadin Panimo =

Finnish microbrewery

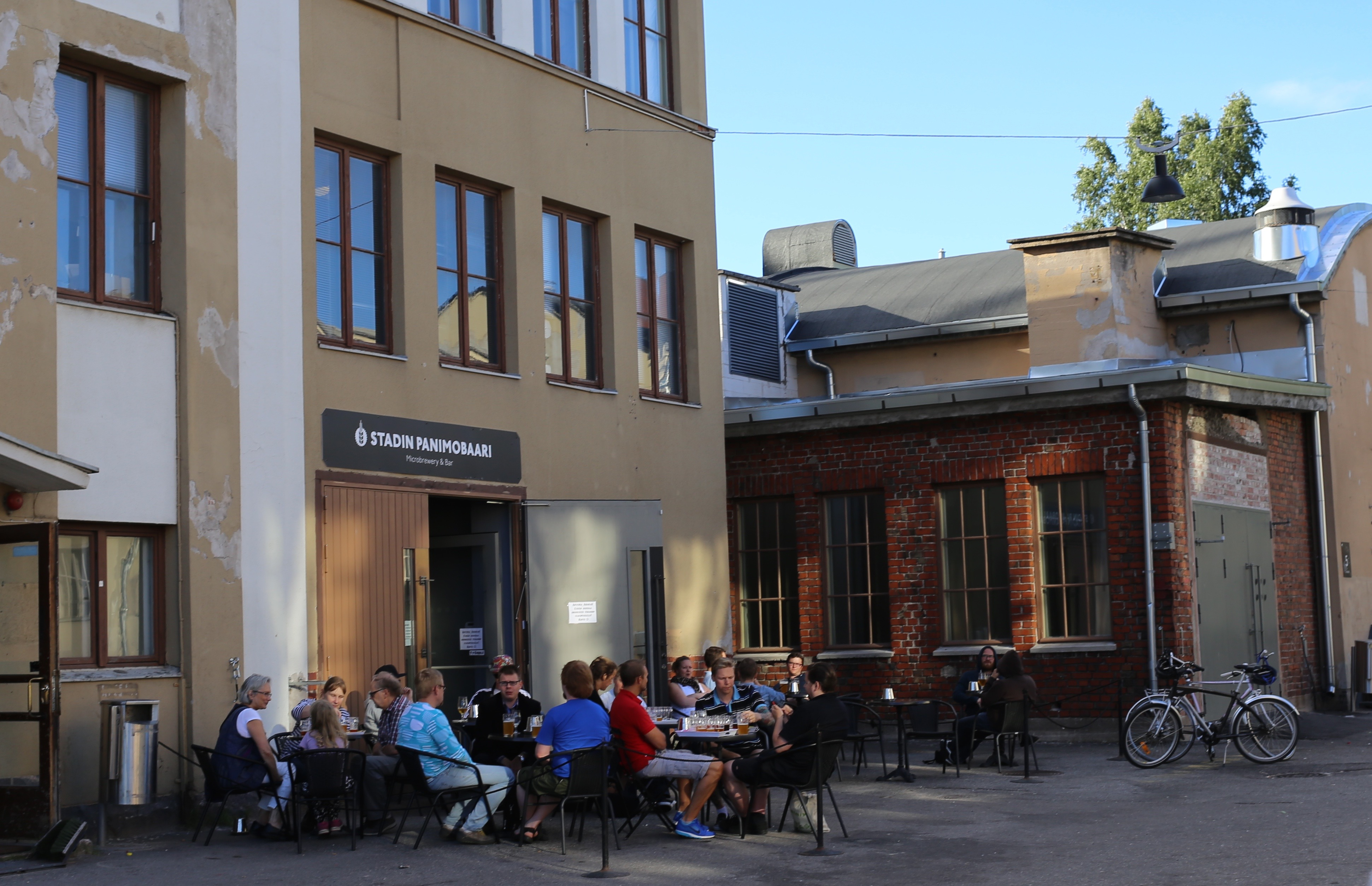
The terrace of the Stadin Panimo brewery in Suvilahti.

Stadin Panimo is a craft brewery based in Suvilahti in Helsinki, Finland, founded in 1998. The brewery produces over 100 thousand litres of beverages per year. The brewery's products are widely sold in retail stores and in Alko stores.

Until 2013 the brewery produced 30 to 50 thousand litres per year, but after moving to larger premises in Suvilahti in autumn 2013 its capacity has increased to over 100 thousand litres.

The brewery company ran into difficulties in 2015 when it became known that part of the brewery's products had been produced in Olvi's facilities with Olvi's equipment. The brewery's tax deductions were also questioned.

== History ==
Stadin Panimo was originally founded as a company in 1998. The first brewery equipment was originally constructed in an old fish wholesale warehouse owned by the city of Helsinki at the Tukkutori square in Kalasatama in 1999. The founders of the brewery were:

- Kari Likovuori (beer expert and lecturer, active beer society member and home brewer)
- Ari Järmälä (long-time home brewer, awarded Home brewer of the year several times at the annual Finnish home brewing association (SKOOL) contest)
- Ilkka Sysilä (brewery trainer who has coached several microbreweries in Mustiala)
- Timo Konttinen (entrepreneur, beer judge, also attended Mustiala microbrewery school)
- Juha Paronen (financial expert)

Stadin Panimo became the first commercial sahti brewery in Helsinki when it produced its first sahti products, Stadin Kundi and Stadin Friidu in autumn 1999. The brewery first appeared in publicity at the sahti weeks at St. Urho's Pub on 14 March 2000. After presenting the sahti products the brewery started producing its other beers in May 2000.

In April 2007 Stadin Panimo announced it had ceased activities. The chairman of the board Timo Konttinen said the reason was that the company was operating at a loss and it was not worth continuing the activities as a hobby. The beer recipes remained with Konttinen. The transfer of ownership was not carried out under complete mutual agreement.

=== New start ===
Timo Konttinen, having remained almost the sole owner of the brewery, invested over 100 thousand euro in the brewery in July 2008 to acquire new fermenting vessels and a new bottling line. The idea was also to start producing lager beer, which the brewery had so far been unable to do because of lack of cold premises. The newly refreshed Stadin Panimo brewery produced its first bottled beer Stadin Pale Ale in May 2009.

In 2013 the brewery moved from Kalasatama to Suvilahti. In spring 2015 the brewery announced it was opening a brewery restaurant in connection with its brewery premises.

== Products ==
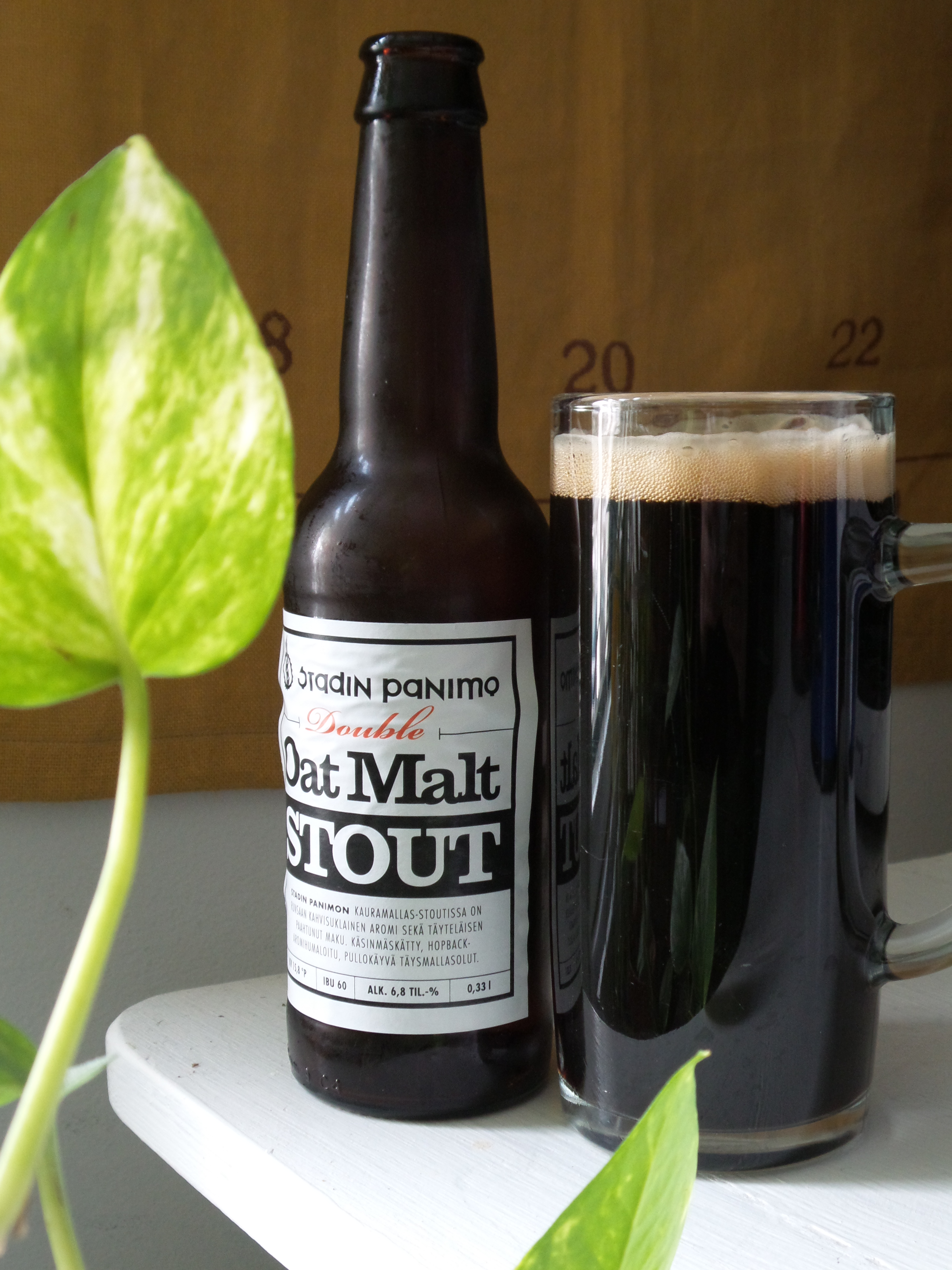
Stadin Panimo Double Oat Malt Stout-

Stadin Panimo has had an exceptionally large selection of beers. According to Konttinen the brewery has produced several hundred kinds of beer. Some of the beers have also been sold under various product names, such as seasonal beers in various beer restaurants. The principal business idea of the brewery was to sell beers produced by request, which the small 500 to 900 litre brewing capacity was well suited to. The selection covered almost all principal beer styles.

=== Examples of products ===
- American Pale Ale: Awarded Beer of the Year at the Helsinki Beer Festival in 2005
- Alpo's IPA: The second most bitter beer in Finland (bitterness 95 EBU)
- Stadin American Larger: Awarded first place at the category for bottom-fermented beer under 4.7% at the Best beer in Finland contest in 2012 to 2013

The brewery has also had several other placements at the Best beer in Finland competition in the latest years.
