= Dupont Brewery =

Brewery in Tourpes (Leuze-en-Hainaut), in western Hainaut, Belgium

Coordinates: 50°34′19″N 3°39′03″E

- Industry: Alcoholic beverage
- Founded: 1950
- Headquarters: Tourpes, Hainaut, Belgium
- Products: Beer
- Production output: 20,000 hL

Dupont Brewery (in French: Brasserie Dupont) is a brewery in Tourpes (Leuze-en-Hainaut), in western Hainaut, Belgium. Founded in 1950, it is on a working farm which dates back to 1759 and has significant brewing history. In the 1990s, a bread bakery and cheese-making facility were added.

Historically, their best-selling beer was the Moinette Blonde. However, the popularization of the Saison Dupont by their American importer in the 1980s led to great international popularity for this beer, which provides a link to the historic farmhouse ales of the region.

== Technical information ==
The brewery's copper boiling kettles date from the 1920s, but there are also a number of pieces of modern equipment in use in the brewhouse. Square, flat-bottomed fermentation tanks of stainless steel are utilized to provide specific flavor characteristics that are evident in the finished beer. Primary fermentation lasts about 5 days, followed by a 1-2 week secondary fermentation. After this, the beer is packaged and warm-aged at the brewery for 6–8 weeks at 73 °F (23 °C). All of Dupont's beers are naturally carbonated via bottle conditioning.

The distinctive Dupont house yeast strain has been the subject of much speculation and discussion. The complexity of flavors it generates has caused some to suggest that in fact a combination of multiple strains are used, and its good performance at high temperatures and signature spiciness have led some to conjecture that it was originally a red wine strain that has been adapted to beer fermentation. While most ales are fermented at temperatures not exceeding 68–72 °F (20–22 °C), the tanks at Dupont have been observed to have reached the mid-90s(32 °C+).

== Beers ==
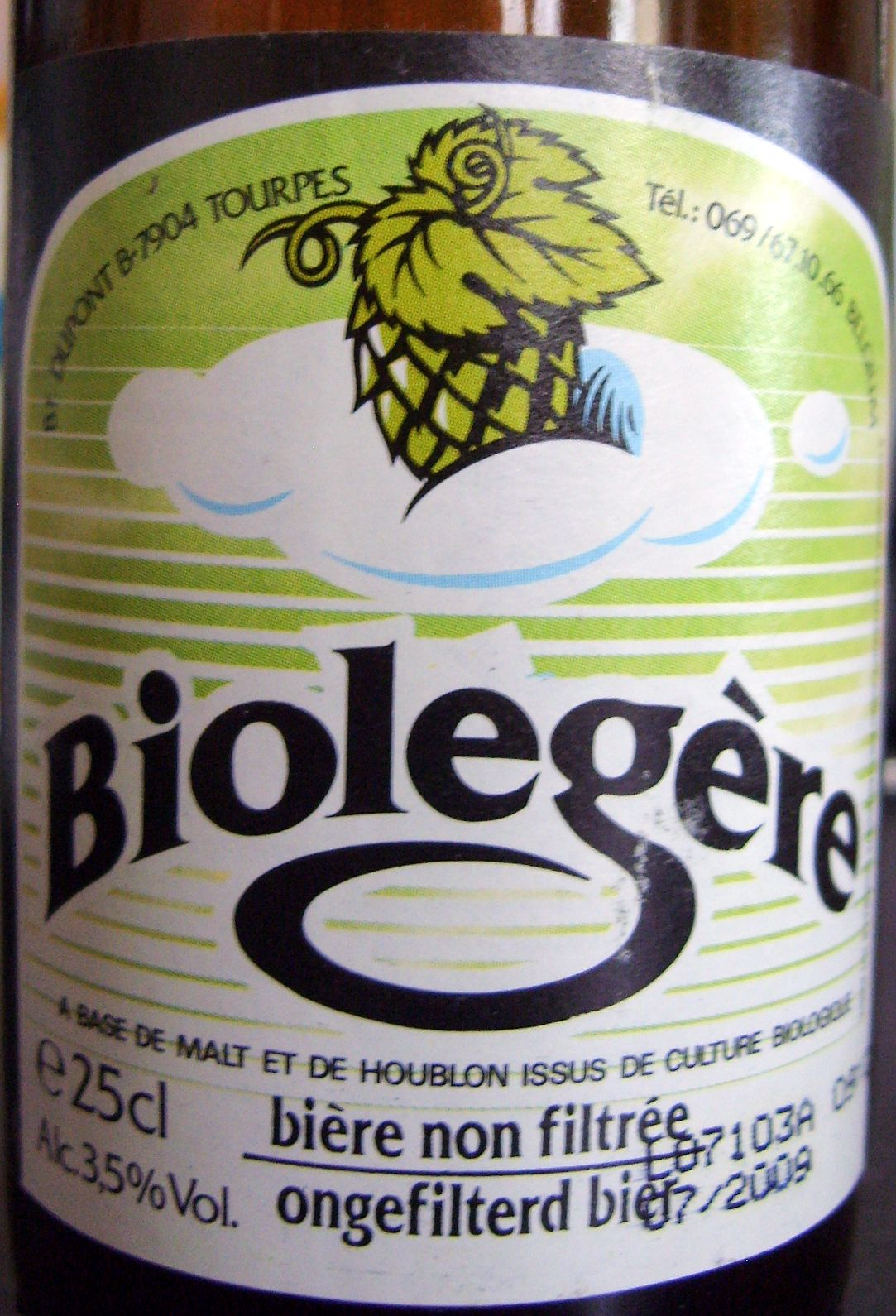
Dupont Biolégère, a 3.5% abv saison

- Saison Dupont (6.5% ABV) A slightly cloudy yellow-coloured ale with high carbonation, fruity and spicy aromas and tastes, and perceptible, somewhat quinine-like bitterness. Brewed in the Saison style from Pilsner malt and Kent Goldings and Styrian Goldings hops. Originally titled "Saison Vielle Provision", the beer was also dry-hopped until the brewery stopped this practice in favour of a larger late hop addition in the boil. Unfiltered and bottle-conditioned, Saison Dupont is packaged in both green and brown glass bottles of a thickness appropriate to withstand the substantial carbonation. Some bottles are finished with a champagne-style cork and wire cage.
- Moinette Blonde (8.5% ABV)
- Moinette Brune (8.5% ABV)
- Avec Les Bons Vœux de la Brasserie Dupont (9.5% ABV) This strong golden-coloured ale began as the brewery's Christmas gift or "Cadeau" for friends and favored business associates, but has become part of their regular commercial lineup. Often referred to simply as "Bons Vœux", the beer's name means "Best wishes from the Dupont Brewery".
- Bière de Belœil (8.5% ABV)
- Bière de Miel (8.0% ABV) A beer brewed with the addition of honey. An organic version is also available.
- Biolégère (3.5% ABV). A light blond beer, brewed with only organic ingredients.
- Blanche du Hainaut Biologique (5.5% ABV). A white wheat beer, brewed with only organic ingredients.
- Foret Saison (5.5% ABV) A Saison brewed from organic ingredients.
- Cervesia (8.0% ABV)
- Redor Pils (5.0% ABV)
