= Farmhouse ale =

Beer brewed by farmers from their own grain

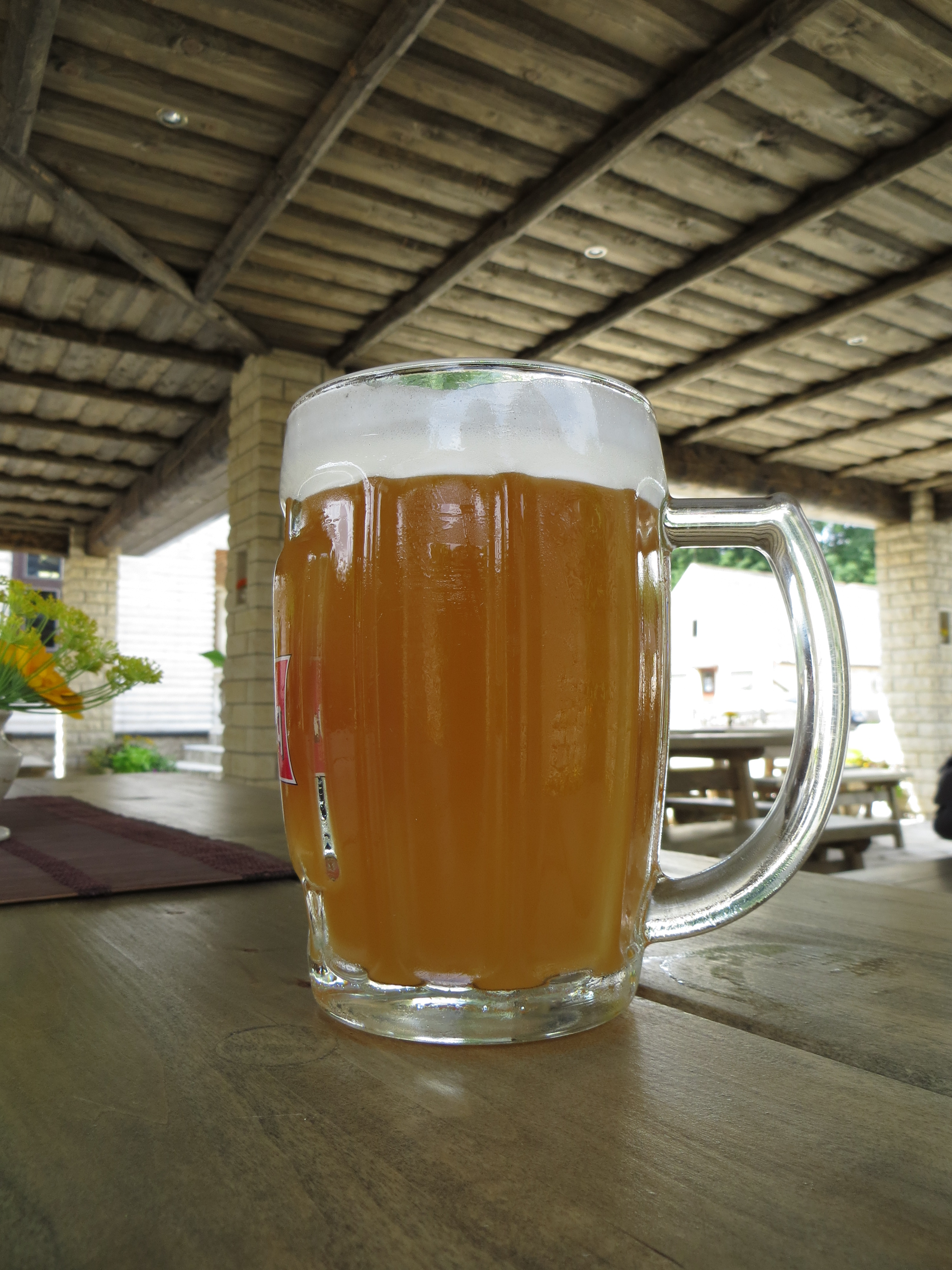
A glass of Pihtla koduõlu, a farmhouse ale from Estonia

The Farmhouse ale is an ancient European tradition whereby farmers would produce beer for their own consumption using their own grain. Most farmers brewed ales for consumption during Christmastime and/or work in the late summer, but those with a plentiful-enough grain supply brewed for everyday drinking. Farmhouse ales do not constitute a single beer style; they vary significantly in terms of the ingredients and brewing process used, both of which follow ancient local traditions.

Many microbreweries and craft breweries in the present day market products as farmhouse ales, but in most cases, their connection with the actual farmhouse brewing tradition is rather tenuous. Breweries in Belgium and Northern France, for example, claim to sell beers derived from those traditionally brewed on local farms. This connection is not well-documented, however, and it is unclear how close these commercially-brewed offerings are to the farmhouse-brewed originals.

A notable exception are the commercial farmhouse breweries in Finland, Estonia, and Lithuania. These businesses brew on farms according to the ancient traditions, and some of them still use the original farmhouse yeast.

== History ==
Farmers have been brewing beer from their own grain since long before the beginning of recorded history. Originally, farmhouse ale was brewed all over Europe, but in classical antiquity wine-growing largely displaced beer brewing in southern Europe. In northern Europe farmhouse brewing was gradually reduced by taxation, modernization, and convenient access to commercially brewed beer; in some areas, however, it never entirely died out.

Over the last decade there has been a resurgence of interest in farmhouse style brewing, partly driven by interest in the unique brewing methods and ingredients still in use. One example is the recent adoption of kveik yeast in modern brewing.

== Varieties ==
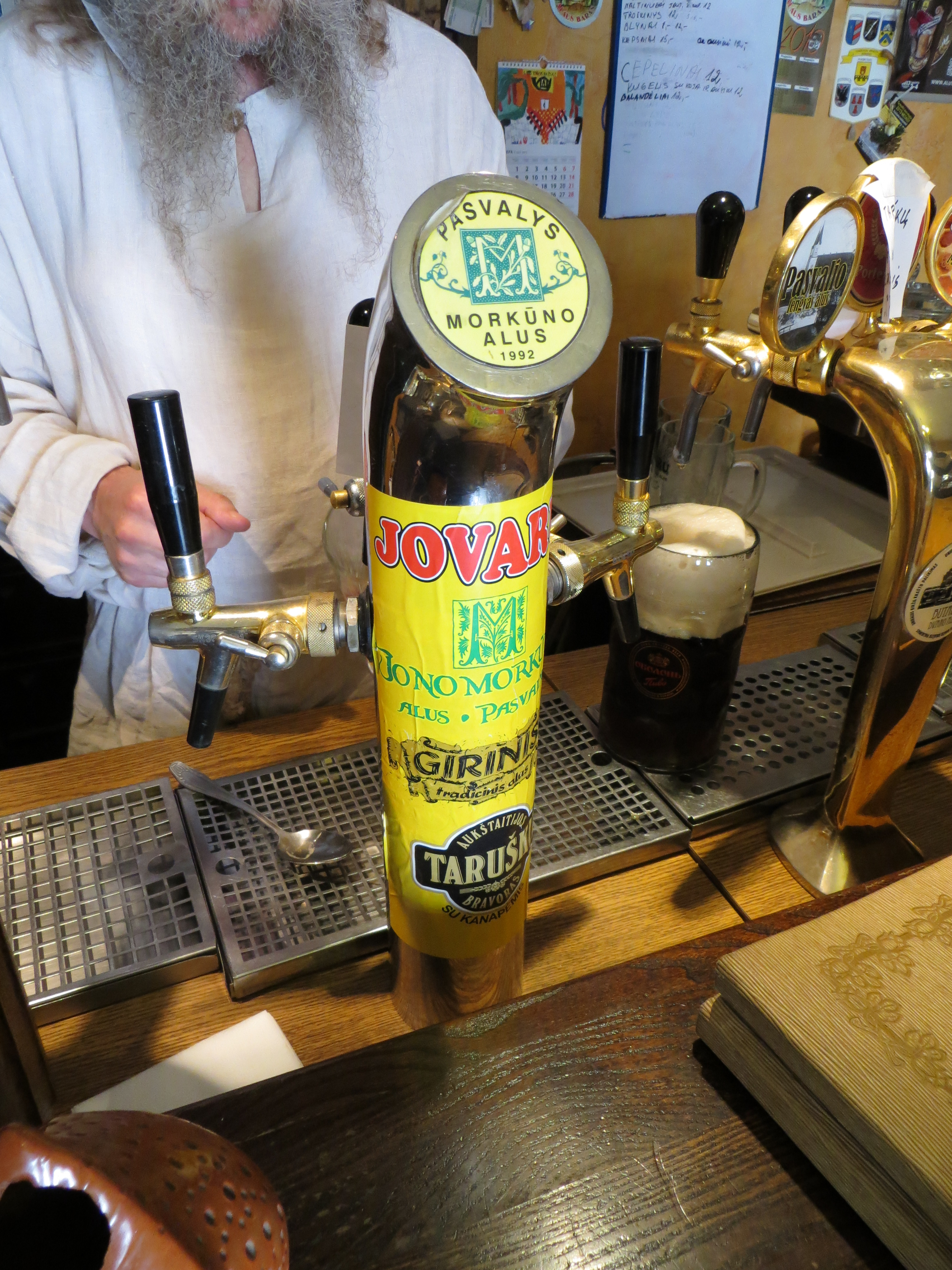
Jovarų Alus, a Lithuanian kaimiškas at Šnekutis bar in Vilnius

Many countries have their own variant of farmhouse-style beers:

- Norway: Several styles collectively known as maltøl
- Belgium: Saison and Grisette
- Finland: sahti, kotikalja
- France: Bière de Garde
- Sweden: Gotlandsdricka
- Denmark: landøl.
- Estonia: koduõlu
- Latvia: miezītis
- Lithuania: kaimiškas
- Russia: derevenskoye pivo (Russian: деревенское пиво), literally, 'rustic beer'.
- In Wisconsin, Spotted Cow is a ubiquitous beer official labeled as a farmhouse ale, but this categorization is disputed.
