= Svagdricka =

Swedish low-alcohol malt beverage

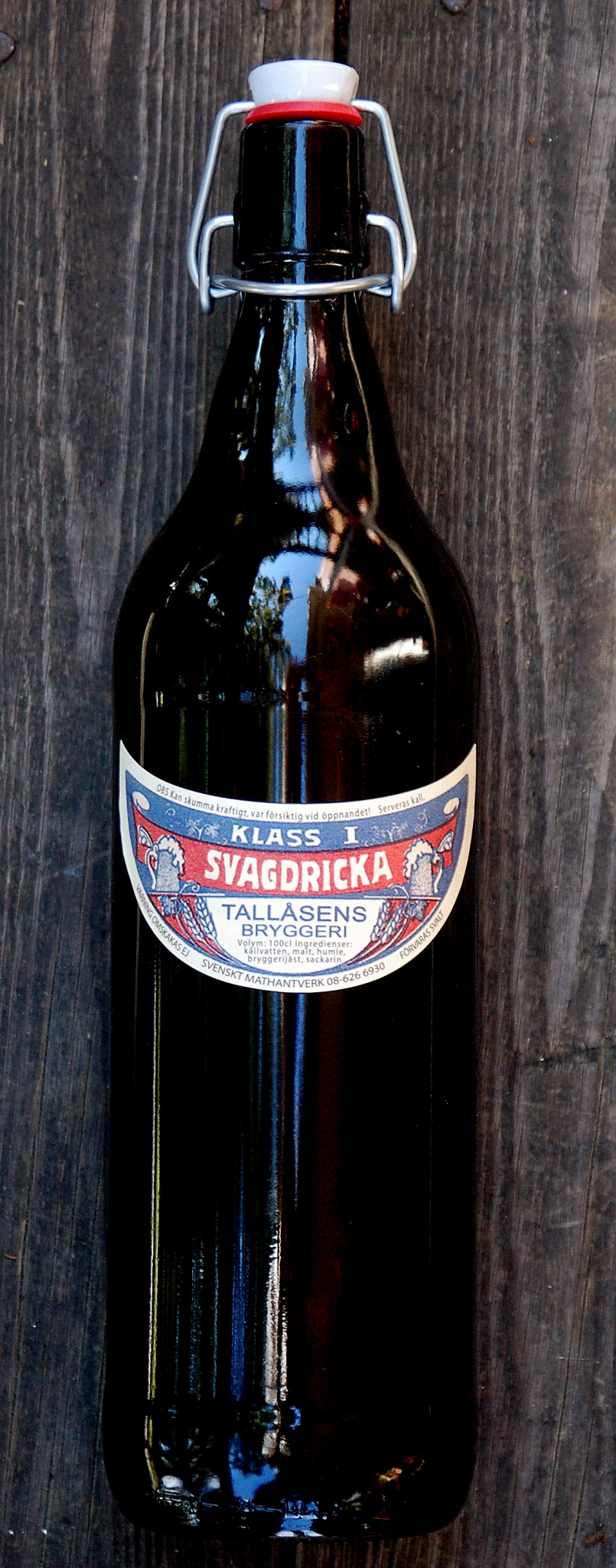
A bottle of Svagdricka

Svagdricka (lit. 'weak drink' in Swedish) is a form of sweet, dark, low-alcohol (less than 2.25% ABV) malt beverage or small ale. In the early 20th century, there were local producers of svagdricka all over Sweden, but in recent decades its popularity has dwindled. It is top fermented, unpasteurized and resembles Russian kvass. It is one of the two old Swedish brews that has survived into modern times, the other one being gotlandsdricka. There are only a few manufacturers left and their production volumes display great seasonal fluctuation with peaks around Christmas and Easter when it is consumed with traditional Swedish food, although eclipsed in popularity by julmust.

== See also ==
- Low-alcohol beer
