= Brasserie de Saint-Sylvestre =

Brewery in France

Coordinates: 50°46′40.5″N 2°33′7.94″E

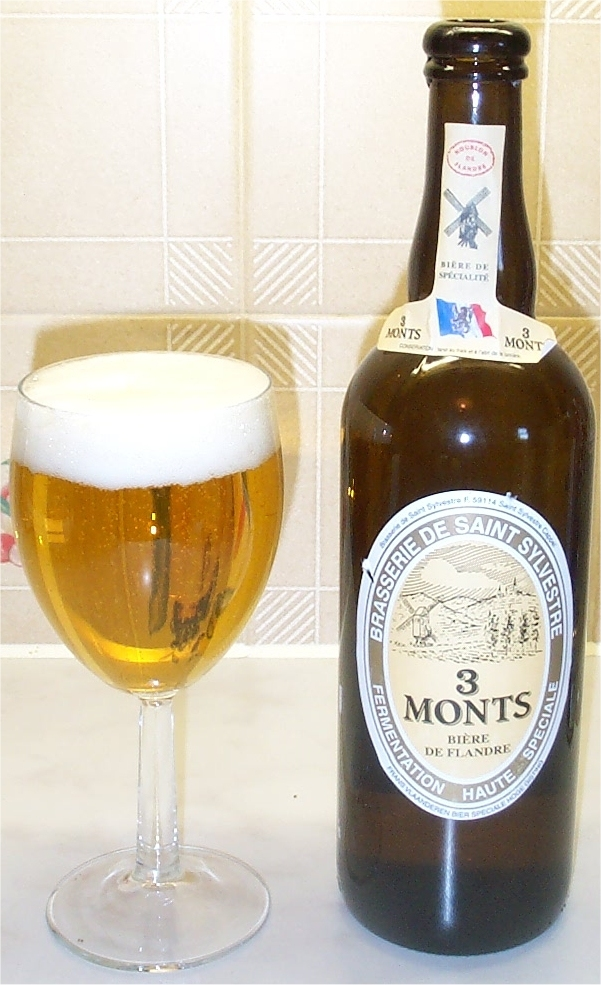
A bottle and full glass of 3 Monts

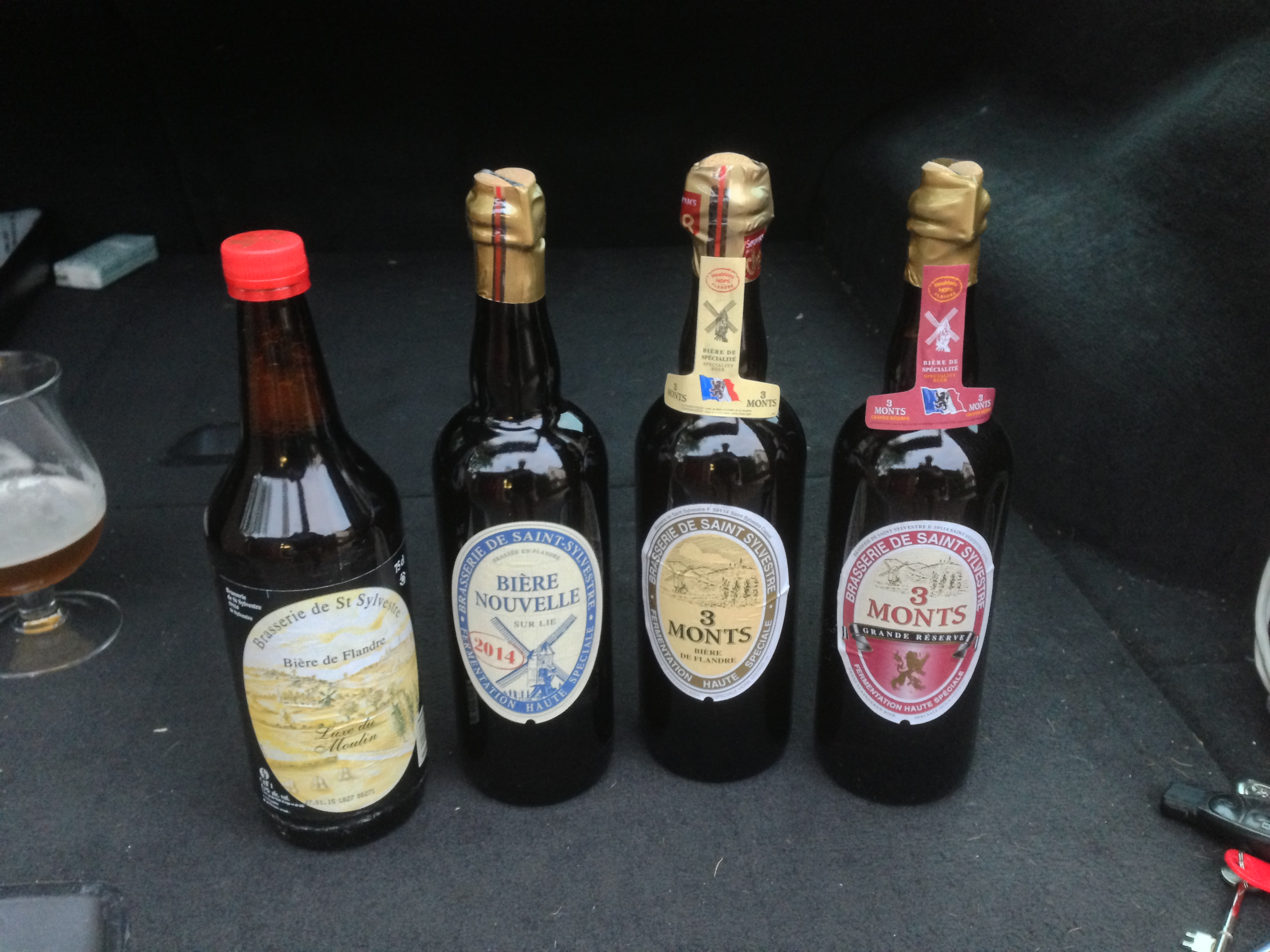
Various beers from Brasserie de Saint-Sylvestre

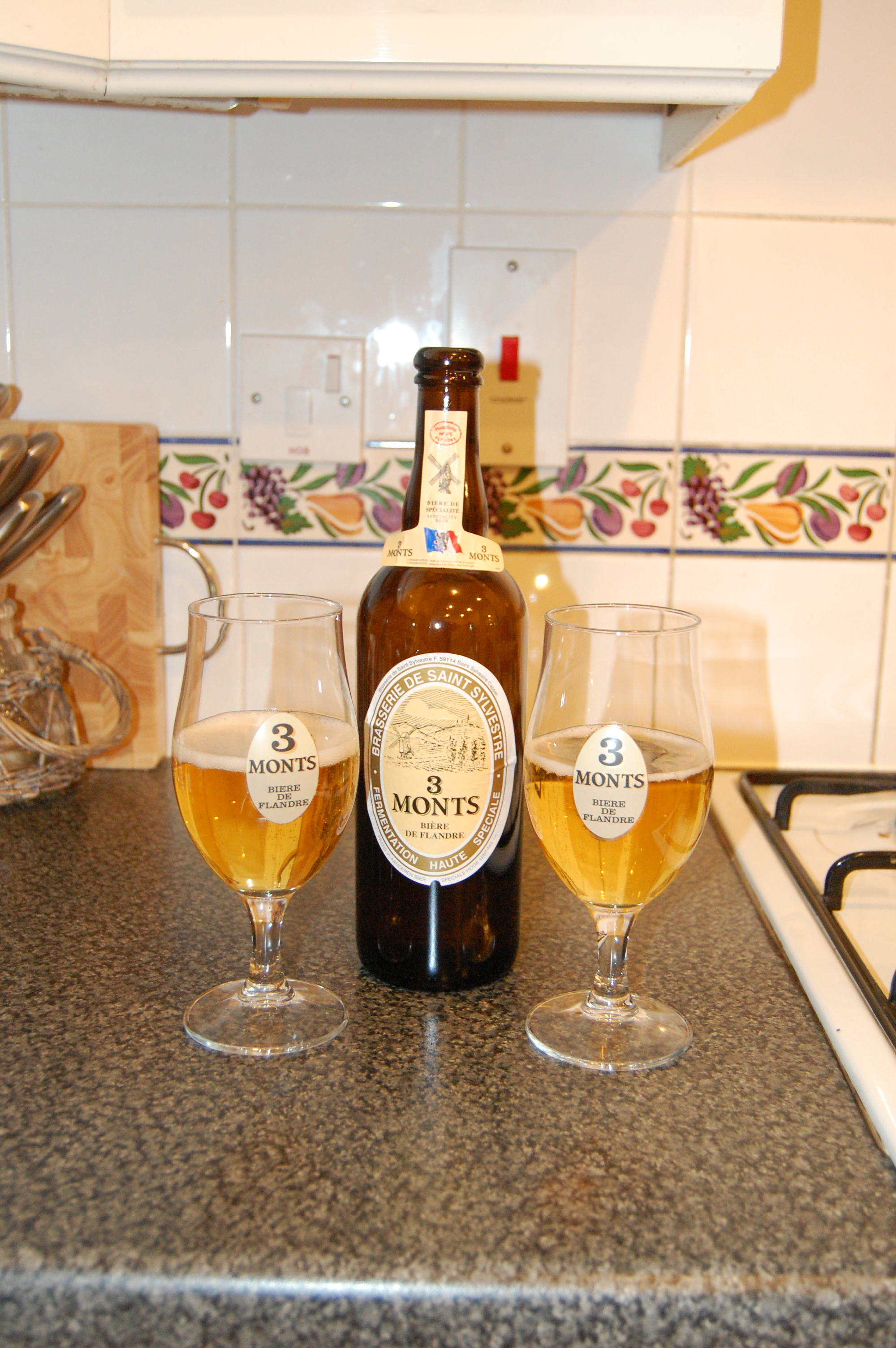
A bottle of 3 Monts beer with matching glasses

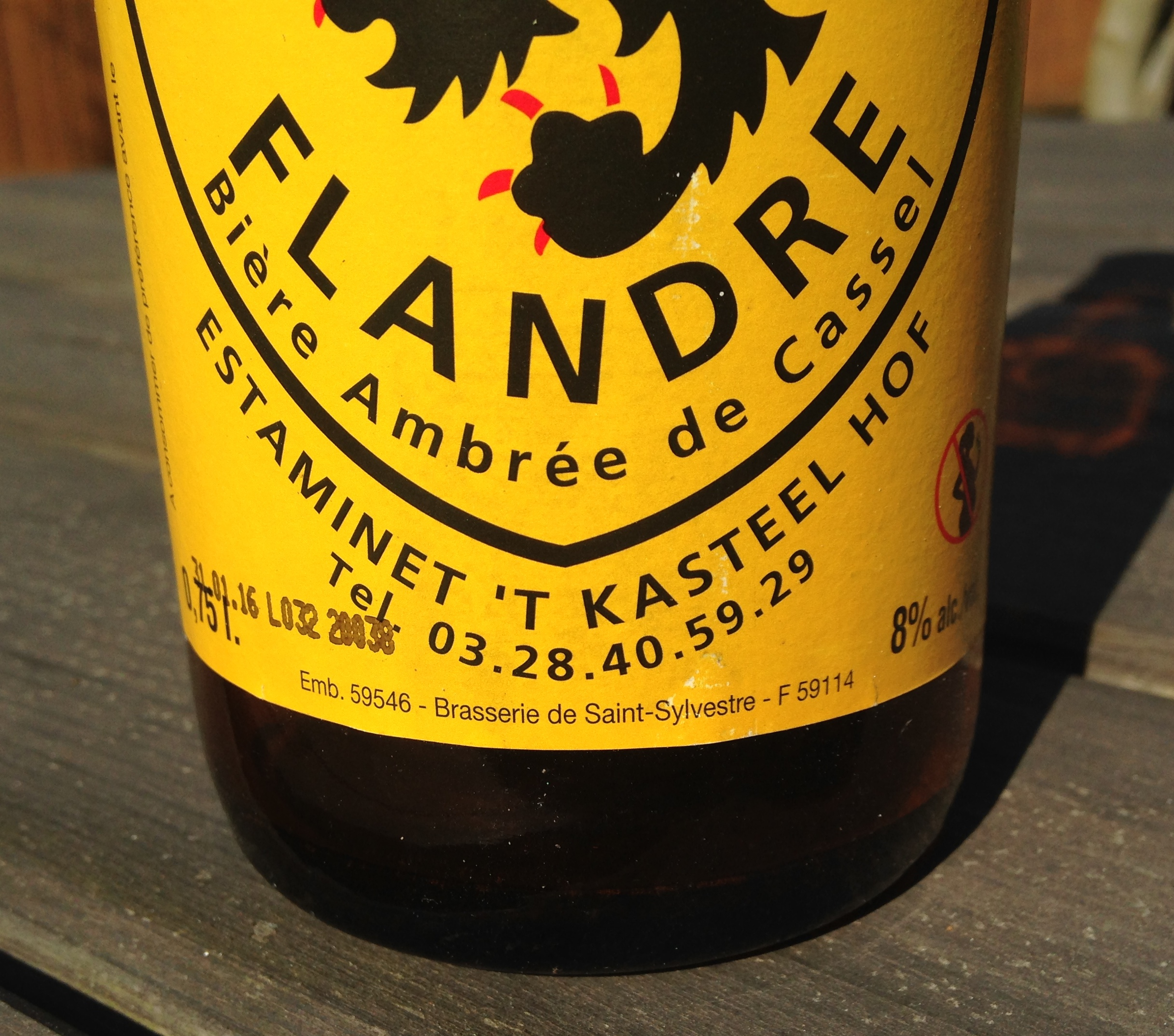
Close up of a bottle of Kassels Bier, the "House Beer" of the Estaminet 'T Kasteel Hof, showing brewery.

The Brasserie de Saint Sylvestre is a brewery in the Nord-Pas de Calais region of northeast France. Brewing in the town of Saint-Sylvestre-Cappel dates back to at least 1600, although the troubled history of Flanders has interrupted business several times.

== 3 Monts ==
While several beers are brewed here probably the best known is 3 Monts which is an 8.5% abv Bière de Garde, brewed in the Flanders region of France where such beers are traditionally termed Bière de Garde, a form of keeping ale. The name of the beer refers to three hills in Flanders, Mont Cassel, Mont des Cats and Mont des Recollets.
