= Jenlain (beer) =

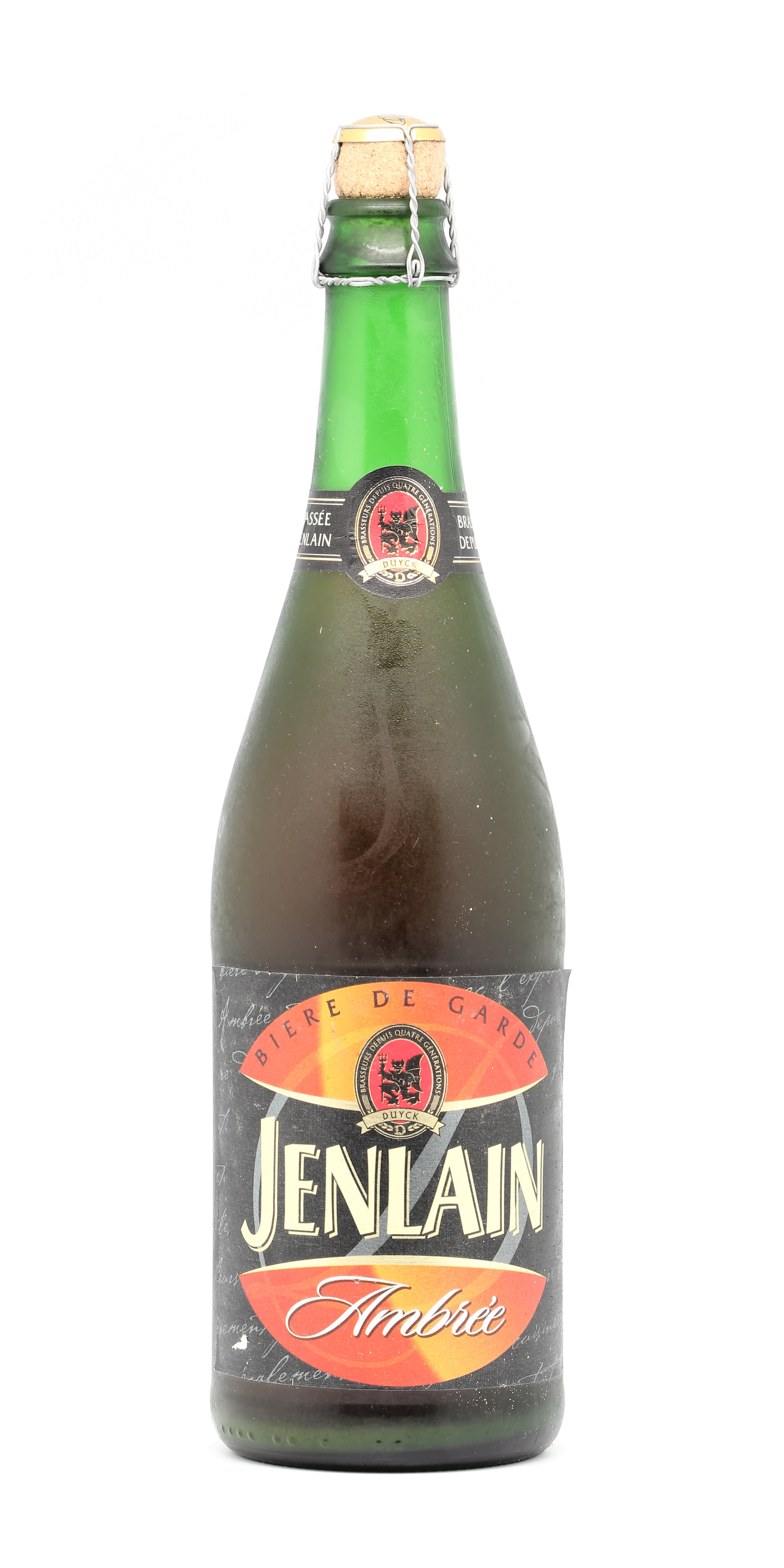
Jenlain ambrée.

Jenlain is a range of beers made by the Brasserie Duyck in Jenlain, a commune of the Nord department, in far northern France, just to the west of Belgium. The original Ambrée is a Bière de Garde style amber ale, created in 1922. Several other varieties have been created since then, such as Jenlain blonde, Jenlain fraîche, and a bière de Printemps (spring beer).
