= Gotlandsdricka =

Swedish alcoholic beverage

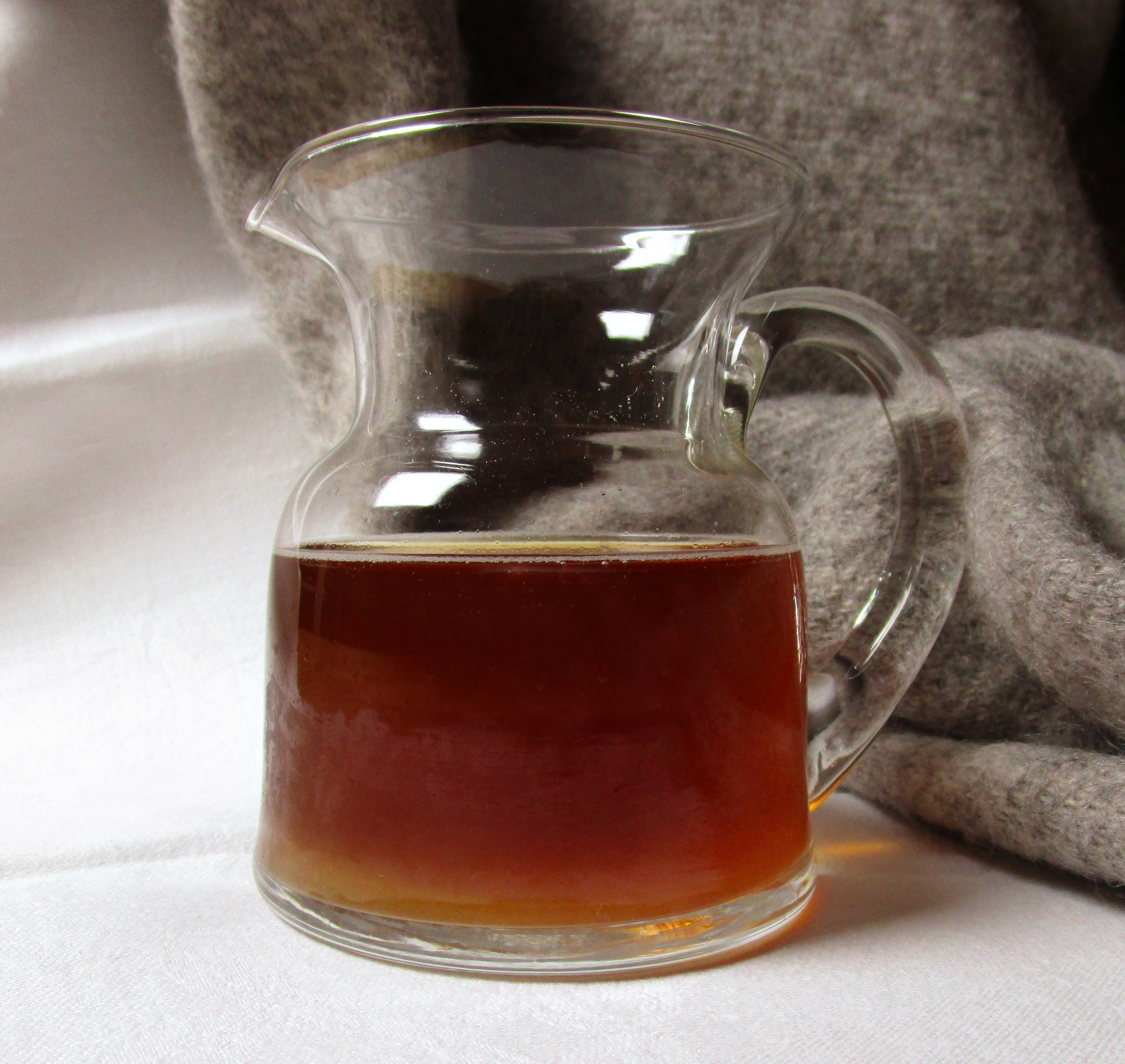
A pitcher of gotlandsdricka

Gotlandsdricka (in modern Gutnish drikke or drikko, and drikku) is a traditional homebrewed alcoholic beverage made on the island of Gotland, Sweden. It is a kind of ale, closely related to the Finnish sahti, and Norwegian maltøl with a smoky, bitter-sweet, spicy (juniper) flavor. It is similar to gruit.

It is similar to an everyday drink - mjöd - used during the Viking Age in most Nordic countries. The tradition of brewing drikke has survived on Gotland, a process that was originally carried out exclusively by women.

Difficult to produce for commercial distribution, it has become a cultural marker for Gotlanders. An annual drikke brewing world championship is held in Gotland each autumn.

== The brew ==
Drikke is a traditional, homebrewed, fermented, unfiltered and unpasteurized alcoholic beverage made on the island of Gotland in the Baltic Sea. The main ingredients are juniper boughs, malt, hops, yeast, water and sugar. The taste is smoky, bitter-sweet, full-bodied and spicy with a significant juniper flavor. Usually dark yellow to golden brown, sometimes with a pink tint and somewhat turbid, it is usually consumed while it is still young and fermenting. Drikke is a perishable product that takes about a week to ferment and should be consumed within another two weeks. After that the taste usually deteriorates, depending on the recipe and the brewing technique. Because of the brew's sweetness, it can be hard to appreciate its alcohol content, which is anywhere from 3 to 12% depending on the amount of sugar added, usually 4-5%.

== History ==
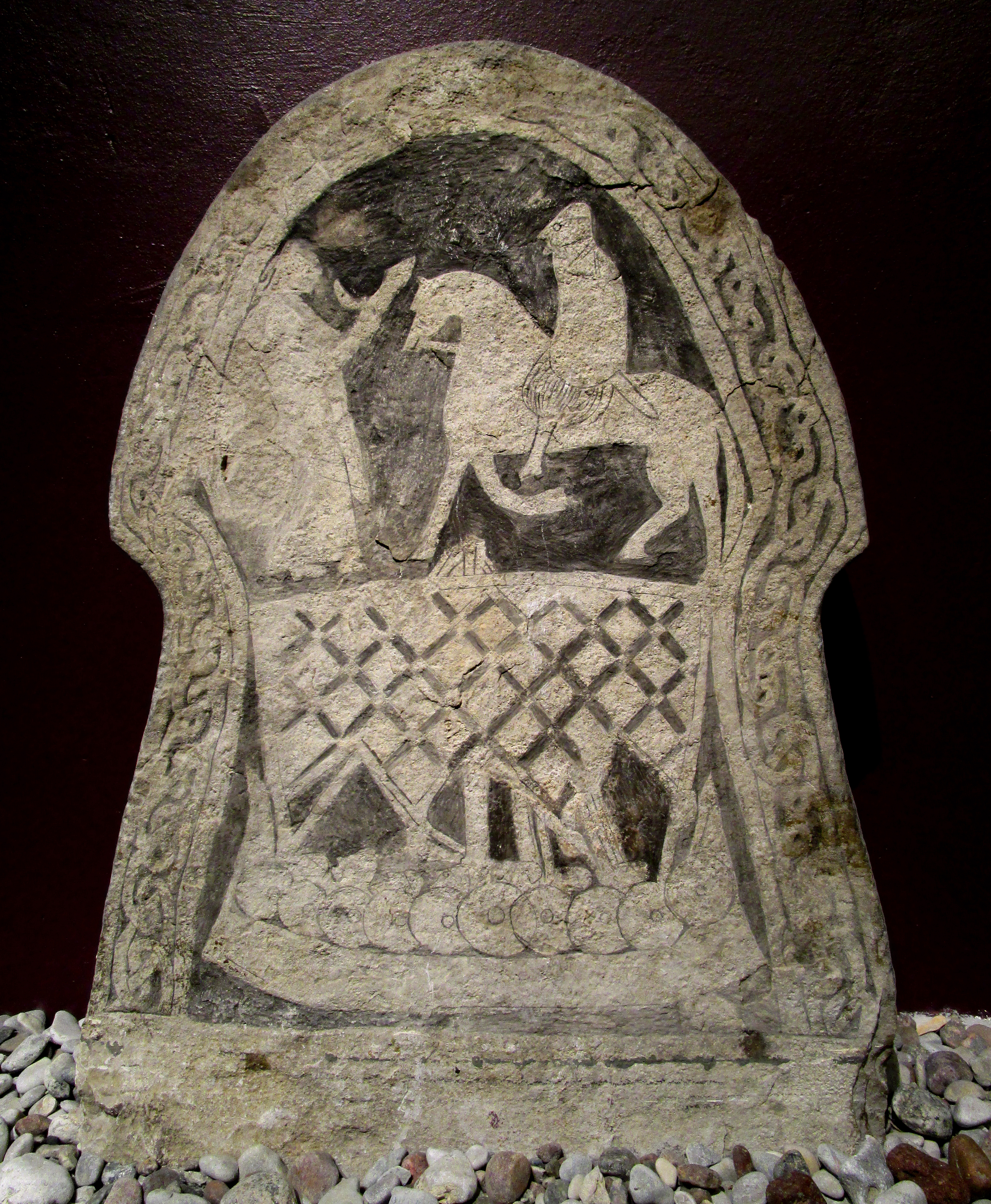
A woman offering a Viking a drink. Picture stone from Halla, Gotland c. 8th-9th century.

The name gotlandsdricka literally means "Gotlandic drink". Gotlanders take great care to distinguish between drikke and ale or beer. Drikke was originally served only with meals, as is milk, water or wine in various modern day cultures. Beer and ale were once considered "alcoholic beverages", whereas different types of malt drinks and drikke were not—these were served to everyone in the family including children. In pre-industrialized Sweden, these drinks were made from malt, juniper, birch sap and honey. The drink made from juniper was considered the poor man's drink and the birch sap even more so. Malt drinks were regarded as the best and were served at special occasions. Simpler drinks made from honey were not brewed like mead. After the honey had been extracted from the honeycombs, they were boiled in water. After cooling, the wax was removed and the remaining honey water left to ferment. Only two of these are still frequently used with meals: svagdricka and gotlandsdricka.

Since the Viking Age up until the time of the Industrial Revolution, brewing ale and drikke on Gotland was traditionally done by women. Men could help fetching water, wood, juniper or making the necessary equipment but the brewing itself was strictly for women. A farm's reputation was often at stake when it came to making good brews for the people who worked on the farm and for guests, and a matron would take pride in her brewing skills.

Gotlandsdricka is essentially the same everyday brew that the Vikings drank. Brewing techniques have been updated through the centuries, but the ingredients and taste remain the same. Originally this kind of brew was made in all Nordic countries, but the widespread tradition of its brewing has only survived into modern times in small more isolated areas, like the island of Gotland. When hops were introduced in Scandinavia during the 13th century, these were used to compliment drikke's juniper boughs as flavoring. Gotland, as well, retained the tradition of using juniper although some hops were added to recipes, as it was a better preservative and added more flavor. The main flavoring was still juniper boughs and sweet gale. During the 20th century, sugar became a substitute for honey as the sweetener in drikke, but it is still brewed with honey, or without any additional sweetener at all, in parts of the island. Gotlandsdricka is closely related to the Finnish sahti, and Norwegian kornøl which is made using the same ingredients and techniques.

== Brewing process ==
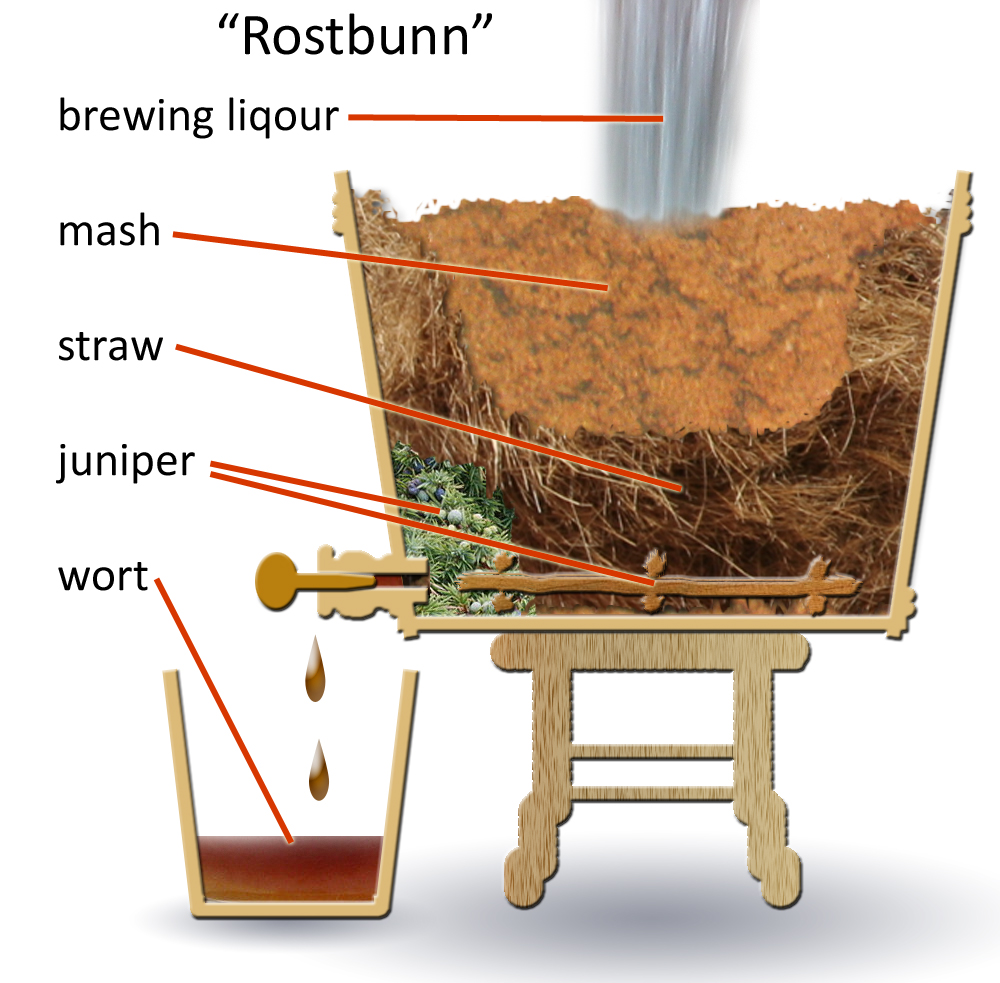
A rostbunn

The brewing process for gotlandsdricka is started by malting grain into malt. The grain can be barley, wheat, rye or oats and the choice of grain depends on what is grown and available locally. The malt is produced by letting the grain sprout and then drying it. On Gotland the drying is carried out either in the farm's sauna house or in a small, special hut called a kölna, usually built on top of the brewing house. Most malt is dried in the smoke of a fire lit below the kölna, but there are farms that let the hot air circulate in pipes under the bed of malt to minimize the smoky flavor of the drikke. There are almost as many versions of wood use and if it should be with or without the bark, as there are farms. The kölna could also be used for drying flax or as a smoker for meat, fish, lamb and other foodstuffs . Finally, the dried malt is ground with opinions varying as to how fine the end product should be.

The malt is then placed in a wooden mash tun and hot brewing liquor made from water boiled with juniper boughs and berries, is poured into the tun. The porridge-like mixture called mash is first thoroughly agitated and then left to rest for a couple of hours.

Brewing is done in a wooden tub called a rostbunn with a tap at the bottom. In the rostbunn, layers of the different components for the brewing are positioned. This is called "laying the bunn". Getting the bunn right is the most difficult and crucial part of the brewing. The layers must be compact enough for the liquid to flow slowly through the rostbunn but not so compact as to stop the flow completely. There are a number of traditions for "laying the bunn", many of which include old superstitions—amongst others complete silence is required during the work, no "outsiders" may be present, a piece of steel or an ancient stone axe should be placed in the bunn. A lattice of shaved juniper branches is placed in the bottom of the rostbunn, and the area close to the tap is padded with juniper boughs. The tub is then lined with threshed straw (sometimes thinner branches of juniper are used instead) and the mash placed in the middle of the bunn.

When the bunn has settled, more hot brewing liquor is poured onto the mash and the tap carefully opened. The wort, or lännu, is collected in a bucket under the tap. Brewing liquor can be added continuously to the bunn depending on the strength of lännu required. Sometimes the first lännu is kept separate as a stronger brew for special occasions, and the last used for everyday drinking. The collected lännu is boiled—the longer the boiling the sweeter the drikke—and additional flavoring such as hops or sweet gale and sugar or honey are added.

The brew is then cooled and filtered. Yeast, usually ordinary baking yeast, is added and the drikke put into wooden barrels or glass carboys to ferment for four or five days. Modern brewers have experimented with bottling drikke before fermentation, to make it carbonated and sparkling.

== Modern brewing ==
In modern drikke brewing, most wooden vessels have been replaced by more practical tubs and buckets made of steel or plastic. The malt is purchased from breweries and the entire process can be shortened to boiling a textile bag containing the malt, hops and other spices directly in the brewing liquor using a large pot placed on the stove. The fermenting is mostly done in plastic jerrycans.

== Commercial brewing ==
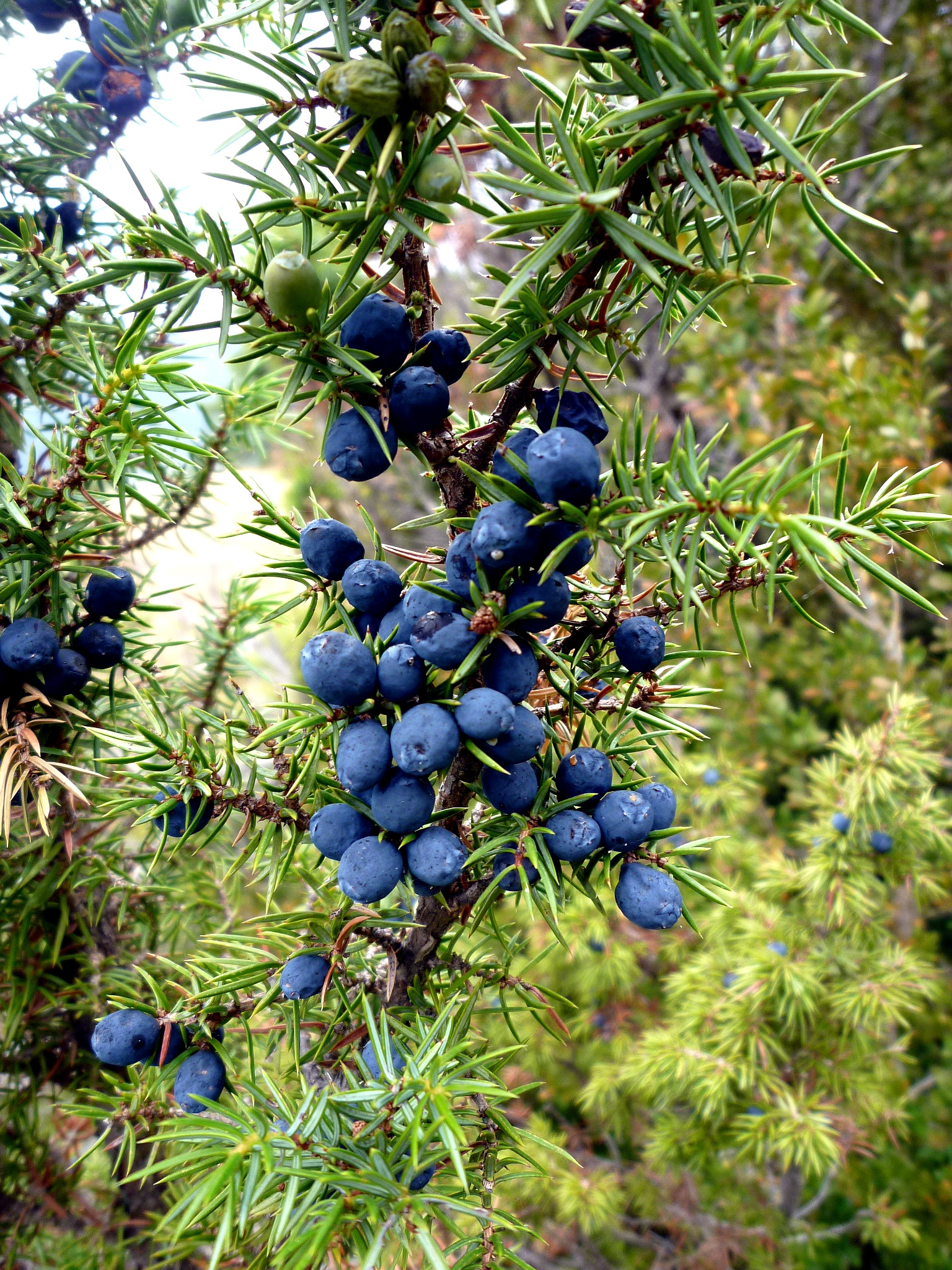
Juniperus communis

When the annual Medieval Week on Gotland started in 1984, drikke was brewed and sold in the medieval market. In 2000, this came to the attention of the legal authorities on Sweden's mainland and the police intervened and stopped the sales. The main problem was that the alcohol content in the brew was not fixed but varied considerably. Another problem was that since the drikke is highly perishable, it cannot be made with techniques and bottled in ways that conforms with the rules and regulations of the National Food Administration. This also prevented drikke being served at events in connection with Gotland being chosen as the "Food Capital" of Sweden in 2013. Several motions have been made to the Riksdag to enable it to be served or sold at public events. All of these have been denied.

In 2012, the Gute vingård (the Gute Vineyard) created the first commercial whisky made from gotlandsdricka, "Gutevin Sudret Whiskey". The first batch was laid down in casks in 2004 and aged until 2013.

The Jester King Brewery in Texas makes a version of Gotlandsdricka, and it is also brewed at Niagara College in Canada.

== Cultural marker ==
When the northern part of Gotland became industrialized in the early 20th century, local traditions and customs also changed. Homebrewing was mostly abandoned and the art of drikke making receded to the southern part of the island. Towards the end of the 1960s, interest in malt-brewing was revived as part of the wave of rediscovering old traditions and crafts that swept over Sweden at that time. Gotland had also developed into a place where tourism was becoming ever more vital to the island's economy, and traditional Gotlandic culture and crafts, such as drikke, became a way for the people on the island to retain their own standing and identity:

The drikke is an excellent excuse for Gotlanders to snub rich visitors from the mainland. It is positively loaded and virtually inaccessible to the visitor, and it exudes a whiff of the past, leading one's thoughts to the island's former days of glory.

== Competition ==
The drikke brewing world championship has been held annually since 1991, traditionally in a location on the southern part of the island. The competition is open to anyone brewing gotlandsdricka, and the jury consisting of six persons normally get 35-40 entries to evaluate. As of 2015, the youngest winner of the championship was 22-year-old Daniel Lundström in 2014.

The 2008 championship was documented by the German television station ProSieben for their series "Galileo", which included programs about disgusting dishes from around the world. The focus was on the traditional Gotlandic food—cooked lamb eyes and lamb skulls, being served with the drikke.

== See also ==
- List of beer styles
