= Sahti =

Finnish ale

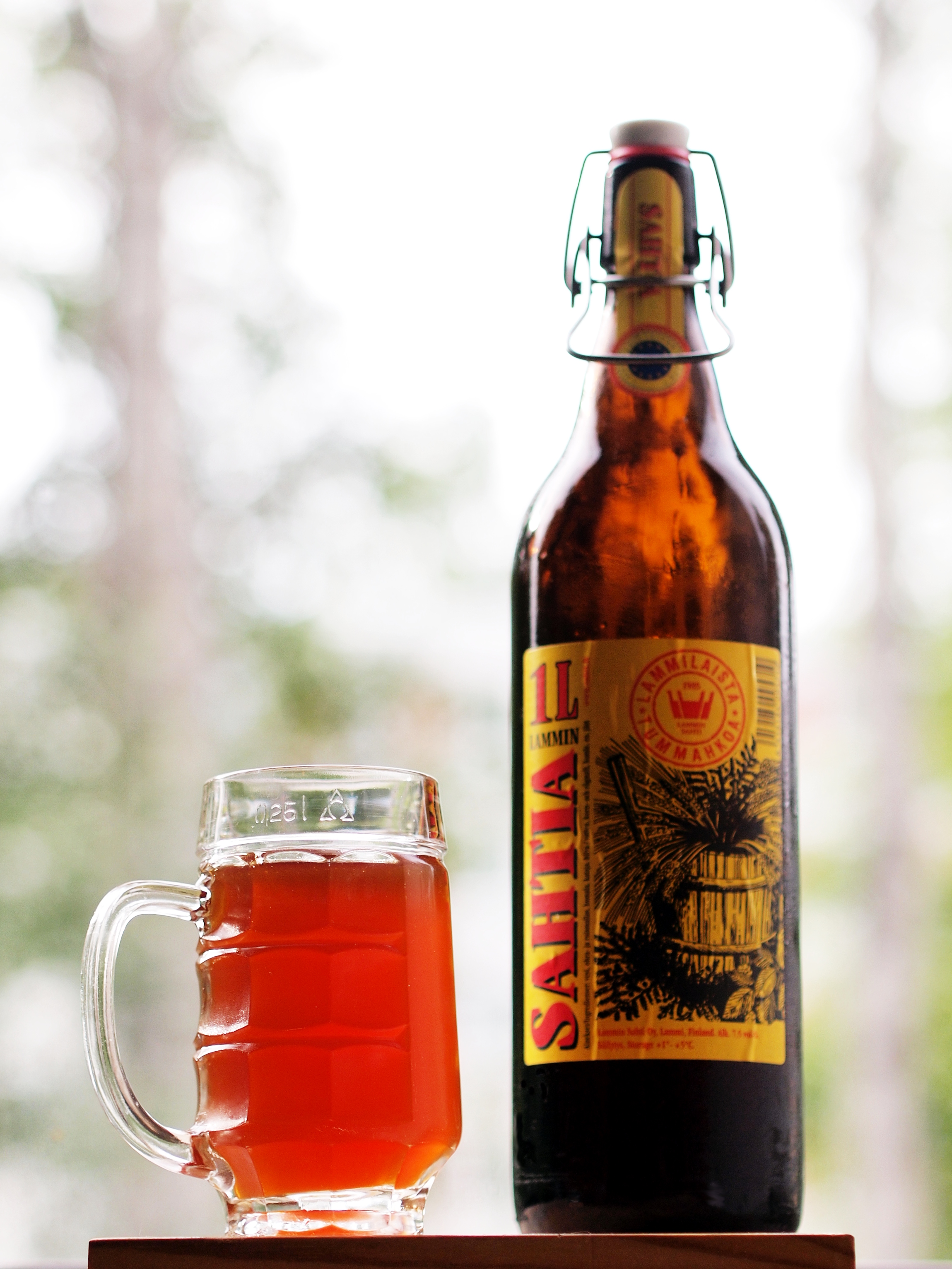
Lammin Sahti, a Finnish sahti brand

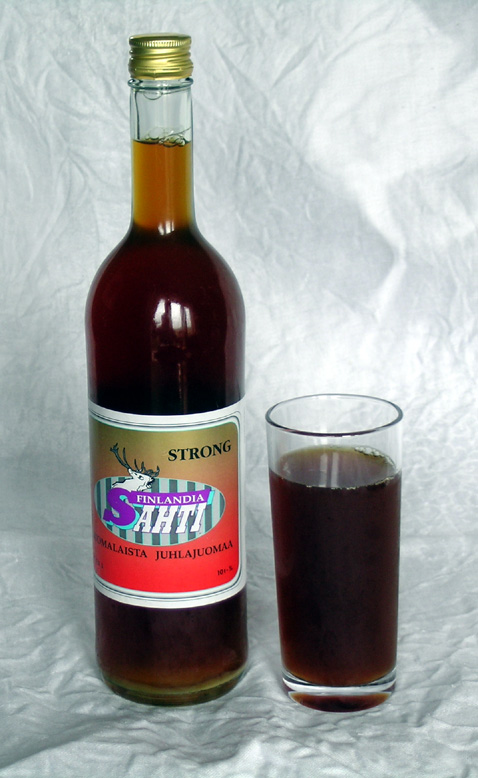
Finlandia sahti

Sahti is a Finnish type of farmhouse ale made from malted and unmalted grains including barley and rye. Traditionally the ale is flavored with juniper in addition to, or instead of, hops; the mash is filtered through juniper twigs into a trough-shaped tun, called a kuurna in Finnish. Sahti is top-fermented and many have a banana flavor due to isoamyl acetate from the use of baking yeast, although ale yeast may also be used in fermenting.

The end product is a cloudy ale with phenolic flavors and a distinct taste similar to banana, balanced by the bitterness from the juniper branches. The carbonation level tends to be very low. Sahti was traditionally brewed as a farmhouse ale, but commercial versions are now available. Commercial sahti is usually 8% ABV. Sahti has to be stored cold until consumption and is therefore not available in all stores.

Within Finland, sahti has differing characteristics depending on which part of the country it is from. It is often known as Tavastian ale from Häme (well-known sahti areas, such as Sysmä, Joutsa, Kuhmoinen and Lammi, are in Häme) but it is also made in Finland Proper and some parts of Central Finland. Every year the Finnish sahti brewing championship is held on the first weekend in August.

== Brewing process ==
Traditionally, the most common sahti brewing process is using a long step infusion mash that may last up to six hours, after which the wort is lautered through the kuurna. Unlike most ales and beers, traditional sahti wort goes straight from the lauter tun to the fermenter without boiling.

However, this is only one of several brewing processes that have traditionally been used. Sahti has also been brewed by mashing with hot stones, with infusion mashing, with variants of decoction mashing, by boiling the mash in the kettle, and so on. Some regions of Finland have called their farmhouse ale taari, and in these areas different brewing processes appear to have been used, such as fermenting in the mash, and baking the wet malts in bread-like shapes before lautering.

== Commercial sahti brands ==
- Kellarin Varastopanimo Joutsa: Varastopanimon Sahti
- Panimoravintola Beer Hunter's: Mufloni Sahti (from Pori)
- Finlandia Sahti and Finlandia Strong Sahti (from Sastamala)
- Hartolan Sahti, known as Krouvin Sahti and Punakallion Sahti.
- Hollolan Hirvi Kivisahti
- Huvila sahti (from Savonlinna)
- Joutsan Sahti
- Lammin Sahti (from Lammi)
- Tiinan Sahti (from Sysmä)
- Stadin Panimo: Stadin Sahti (from Helsinki)
- Olu Bryki Raum / Vanhan Rauman Panimo: Kullervo (Rauma)
- Mallassepät Sahti (from Naantali)
- Pihamaa Sahti and Rehti Sahti (from Kalkkinen)

== In other countries ==
A farmhouse ale that in some cases is similar is brewed on the Swedish island of Gotland (known as Gotlandsdricka). An even closer relative in terms of flavour is a farmhouse ale known as koduõlu (lit. "home beer"), brewed on the Estonian islands in the Baltic.

In Estonia one commercial beer is sometimes described as "Estonian sahti", despite actually being an Estonian koduõlu:

- Pihtla Õlu from Pihtla õlleköök, Estonia

Finnish sahti has protected status in Europe, so that in order to be described as sahti an ale must be brewed following something close to the traditional process and ingredients. Modern craft brewing versions of sahti can be somewhat removed from the original style, because brewers may use hops, might not use juniper twigs, could introduce more carbonation, boil the wort, and may not use Finnish baking yeast.

In many countries sahti has been the subject of recent interest by homebrewers and microbreweries who have brewed many takes on the style. It is not clear if any of them actually resemble the original Finnish sahti ales in any way, so in the EU most of these drinks could not be marketed as sahti.

Other versions:

- Hibernaculum from Venn Brewing in Minneapolis, MN (a sahti-inspired imperial lager infused with juniper)
- Mad Scientist #19 from Sixpoint Brewing
- Samuel Adams: Norse Legend sahti (from Boston, Massachusetts, U.S.)
- Dogfish Head Brewery: Sah'tea (from Milton, Delaware, U.S.) made with masala chai and juniper berries
- Sahti Ale - New Belgium Brewing Company (from Fort Collins, Colorado, U.S.)
- Parallel 49 Brewing Company "Sahti Claws"
- Sahti - Gambling Man Brewing Company, UK (The first true Sahti to be commercially brewed in the UK)
- Ale Apothecary - "Sahati", a mixed fermentation ale lautered in a spruce kuurna with spruce branches
- Browar Pinta - "Koniec Świata" (Polish: "The End of The World", owes its name to the date of its release to the market, which was supposed to be the end of the world), Polish attempt of brewing Sahti beer. Made with juniper berries and branches.
- Bare Bear from Off Color Brewing
- Sahti - Kiitos Brewing, Salt Lake City Utah
- Ivar the Boneless - Proper Brewing, Salt Lake City Utah
- Löyly - HammerHeart Brewing Company, Lino Lakes Minnesota
- Ymir the Creator from High Ground Brewing in Terra Alta, WV
- Mānuka Sahti - Kererū Brewing, NZ
- Bushcrafter Sahti - Prairie Pride Brewing in Grand Island, NE
- Sauna Brau - Turnagain Brewing in Anchorage, AK
- Finnish Line - Independent Brewing in Bel Air, MD
- Osmotar Sahti - from Stonyslope Brewing Company in Calgary, AB, Canada

== See also ==
- Finnish beverages
