= Bière de Garde =

French strong, pale ale

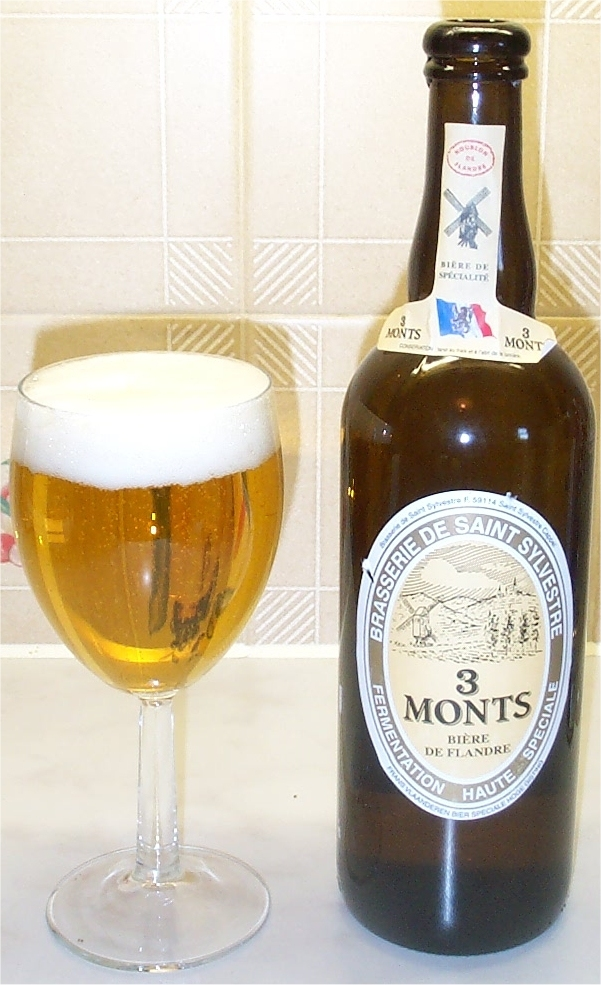
3 Monts, a Bière de Garde

Bière de garde ("beer for keeping") is a strong pale ale or keeping beer traditionally brewed in the Nord-Pas-de-Calais region of France. These beers were originally brewed in farmhouses (they are known as farmhouse ales) during the winter and spring, to avoid unpredictable problems with the yeast during the summertime. Farmhouse production is now supplemented by commercial production, although most Bière de Garde brewers are small businesses.

Typically, beers of this tradition are of a copper colour or golden colour, and as the name suggests the origin of this style lies in the tradition that it was matured or cellared for a period of time once bottled (and mostly sealed with a cork), to be consumed later in the year, akin to a Belgian Saison.

Most varieties are top-fermented and unfiltered, although bottom-fermented and filtered versions exist. Particularly authentic products, using only regional ingredients, are entitled to use the Appellation d'origine contrôlée, Pas de Calais/Region du Nord.

Some of the better-known brands include Brasserie de Saint-Sylvestre Trois Monts, Brasseurs Duyck Jenlain, Brasserie Castelain Ch'Ti and Brasserie La Choulette Ambrée.
