= Saison =

Type of beer

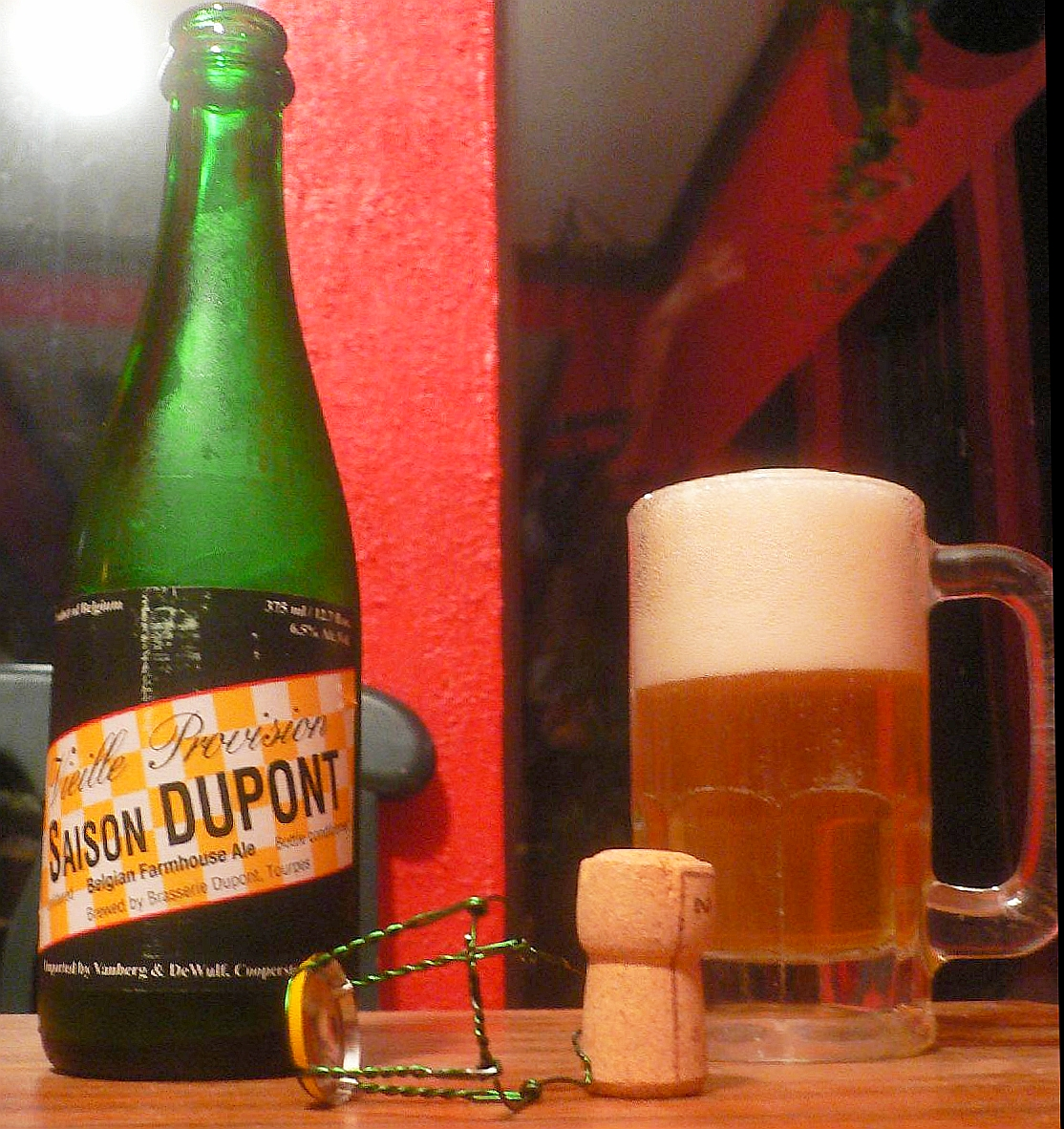
Saison Dupont Vieille Provision, the archetype for modern saisons

Saison (French, "season," French pronunciation: [sɛzɔ̃]) is a pale-colored ale that is highly carbonated, dry, fruity, spicy, and often bottle conditioned. It was historically brewed with low alcohol levels, but modern productions of the style have moderate to high levels of alcohol. Along with several other varieties, it is generally classified as a farmhouse ale.

== History ==
'Bière de saison' is first mentioned in the early 19th century. It was most widely known as a beer from the industrial city of Liège, where it was brewed by professional breweries as a keepable version of the city's spelt beer that had been produced for a few centuries. It was made with malted spelt, unmalted wheat and only a small amount of barley malt. It was typically brewed in winter and drunk after four to six months.

While Liège's saison disappeared after the First World War, it continued to be brewed, generally as a barley-only beer, by professional breweries in the province of Hainaut, who sold it as a 'cuvée réservée' luxury beer, which was 'to be served at room temperature like a good wine' and 'to be poured with care'.

In the late 1980s, American importer Don Feinberg was urged by beer writer Michael Jackson to import Brasserie Dupont's saison to the United States. It was Feinberg who re-styled saison as a 'farmhouse ale': 'People asked: is it a wheat beer? Is it a lambic? I told them it was a hoppy farmhouse ale.'

Saison's reputation was further cemented by Phil Markowski's 2004 book Farmhouse ales and has since become a popular beer style worldwide. It was however only these developments in the 1980s, 1990s and 2000s that cemented saison's reputation as a 'farmhouse ale': in older sources it is never indicated as such and though there has been a limited tradition in Belgium of brewing on farms or brewing for farm workers, it seems to have been conflated with saison only from the 1980s onwards.

Modern saisons are not exclusively brewed seasonally anymore. Generally they are highly carbonated, fruity and spicy — sometimes from the addition of spices.

== Composition ==
The type of malt determines the color of the saison, and although most saisons are of a cloudy golden color as result of the grist being mostly pale or pilsner malt, the use of darker malts results in some saisons being reddish-amber. Some recipes also use wheat.

Spices such as orange zest, coriander, and ginger may be used. Some spice character may come through due to the production of phenols during fermentation at warm temperatures.

Modern examples brewed in the US tend to copy the yeast used by the Dupont Brewery, which ferments better at warmer temperatures like 29 to 35 °C (84 to 95 °F) than the standard 18 to 24 °C (64 to 75 °F) fermenting temperature used by other Belgian ales.

== Fermentation ==
Saisons are a particularly dry style of beer, due to the highly attenuating strain of saccharomyces cerevisiae yeast typically used to ferment them. These strains, referred to as "diastatic strains," can break down more sugars that are normally unfermentable by conventional strains. The activation of the STA1 gene in these strains causes them to produce glucoamylase enzymes, facilitating this extra attenuation.

Cross-contamination of diastatic strains has been known to cause beer spoilage in breweries. In some cases, the resulting unexpected over-fermentation has caused over-carbonated bottles and cans, necessitating recalls.
