= Great Australasian Beer SpecTAPular =

Annual festival in Melbourne and Sydney

GABS
- Industry: Alcoholic beverage
- Headquarters: Australia
- Products: Beer
- Website: www.gabsfestival.com

The Great Australasian Beer SpecTAPular, or GABS as it is commonly known, is a beer and food festival that celebrates the diversity and creativity of craft beer. It is run by The Local Taphouse beer bars each year in Melbourne and Sydney and in 2015, almost 23,000 people attended the events.

The Local Taphouses regularly run beer festivals, or SpecTAPulars, to showcase rare or exclusive beers under a different theme. The original GABS (it was originally called the Great Australian Beer SpecTAPular) was held at both venues in both Sydney and Melbourne on 12 February 2011. Another notable, annual event is the GABS Hottest 100 Aussie Craft Beers of the Year countdown. This event was originally held each Australia Day on January 26, but is now held on the fourth Saturday of January.

The main idea behind GABS was to invite leading Australian craft breweries to brew a special beer just for the event. Not especially confident, Taphouse owners Steve Jeffares and Guy Greenstone thought they would be lucky to get ten new beers so planned to put their favourite Australian beers on the 10 other available taps. The response from brewers was so positive that, ultimately, 22 breweries produced 20 brand new beers for the event.

Emboldened by the events' initial success, it was decided to relocate GABS to the Royal Exhibition Building in Melbourne for three days the following year and become part of Melbourne's Good Beer Week celebrations. About 8000 people attended.

GABS now features hundreds of beers, brewery stands, beer education, local food vendors and entertainment but it is predominantly known for the GABS 'Festival Beers' which are brewed especially for the event by leading brewers in Australia, New Zealand and other invited international brewers.

The first GABS Sydney took place at the Australian Technology Park on Saturday 30 May 2016.

In 2015, American magazine, Beer Connoisseur, rated GABS as one of the top 20 beer festivals in the world.

== Statistics ==
=== 2024 ===
==== Top Hottest 100 Winners ====
1. 'Status Quo' Pale Ale (Mountain Culture Beer Co, NSW)
2. 'Original Pale Ale' Pale Ale (Coopers Brewery, SA)
3. 'XPA' eXtra Pale Ale (Balter Brewing Company, QLD)

=== 2023 ===
==== Top Hottest 100 Winners ====
1. 'Status Quo' Pale Ale (Mountain Culture Beer Co, NSW)
2. 'XPA' eXtra Pale Ale (Balter Brewing Company, QLD)
3. 'Crankshaft' American IPA (Bentspoke Brewing Co, ACT)

=== 2022 ===
==== Top Hottest 100 Winners ====
1. 'Status Quo' Pale Ale (Mountain Culture Beer Co, NSW)
2. 'XPA' eXtra Pale Ale (Balter Brewing Company, QLD)
3. 'Crankshaft' American IPA (Bentspoke Brewing Co, ACT)

=== 2021 ===
==== Top Hottest 100 Winners ====
1. 'Crankshaft' American IPA (Bentspoke Brewing Co, ACT)
2. 'XPA' eXtra Pale Ale (Balter Brewing Company, QLD)
3. 'Larry' Australian Pale Ale (Your Mates Brewing Co, Sunshine Coast)

=== 2020 ===
==== Top Hottest 100 Winners ====
1. 'Crankshaft' American IPA (Bentspoke Brewing Co, ACT)
2. 'Pacific Ale' Australian Pale Ale (Stone & Wood Brewing Co., NSW)
3. 'XPA' eXtra Pale Ale (Balter Brewing Company, QLD)

=== 2019 ===
==== Top Hottest 100 Winners ====
1. 'Pacific Ale' Australian Pale Ale (Stone & Wood Brewing Co., NSW)
2. 'XPA' eXtra Pale Ale (Balter Brewing Company, QLD)
3. 'Crankshaft' American IPA (Bentspoke Brewing Co, ACT)

==== People's Choice Winner ====
- 'Grape Bubblegum Sour' Berliner Weisse (Currumbin Valley Brewing, QLD)

=== 2018 ===
==== Top Hottest 100 Winners ====
1. 'XPA' eXtra Pale Ale (Balter Brewing Company, QLD)
2. 'Pacific Ale' Australian Pale Ale (Stone & Wood Brewing Co., NSW)
3. 'Crankshaft' American IPA (Bentspoke Brewing Co, ACT)

==== People's Choice Winner ====
- 'Boozy Froot' New England IPA (Big Shed Brewing Concern, SA)

=== 2017 ===
==== Top Hottest 100 Winners ====
1. 'XPA' eXtra Pale Ale (Balter Brewing Company, QLD)
2. 'Pacific Ale' Australian Pale Ale (Stone & Wood Brewing Co., NSW)
3. 'Crankshaft' American IPA (Bentspoke Brewing Co, ACT)

==== People's Choice Winner ====
- 'The Mountie' Maple Imperial Stout (Stockade Brew Co, NSW)

=== 2016 ===
==== Top Hottest 100 Winners ====
1. 'Pacific Ale' Australian Pale Ale (Stone & Wood Brewing Co., NSW)
1. 'IIPA' American Double IPA (Pirate Life Brewing, SA)
1. 'Hop Hog' American Pale Ale (Feral Brewing Company, WA)

==== People's Choice Winner ====
- 'Peanut Brittle' Gose (Bacchus Brewing, QLD)

=== 2015 ===
==== Attendance ====
Royal Exhibition Hall, Melbourne. 22–24 May 2015

- Attendance: 16,200 people

Australian Technology Park, Eveleigh, Sydney, 30 May 2016

- Attendance: 6,300 people

==== People's Choice Winner ====
- 'Milk and Two Sugars' Imperial Milk Stout (BrewCult, VIC)

==== Complete List of Festival Beers ====
Beer List (Partial)
- 'Milk and Two Sugars' Sweet Stout – Brewcult (VIC)
- 'HazElla' American Brown Ale – 2 Brothers Brewery (VIC)
- 'Golden Stout Time' Sweet Stout – Big Shed Brewing Concern (SA)
- 'Nightcap' Russian Imperial Stout – Mountain Goat Beer (VIC)
- 'Puffinus Huttoni' Soured Fruit Beer – ParrotDog (NZ)
- '[ragna]RÖK' Double IPA – Ekim Brewing Co (NSW)
- 'Banoffee Pie Dessert Ale' American Brown Ale – Mismatch Brewing Company (SA)
- 'Peach Saison' – Burleigh Brewing Co. (QLD)
- 'Betelgeuse' American Amber Ale – KAIJU Beer (VIC)
- 'Bébé Rouge' Fruit Beer – La Sirène (VIC)
- 'Spotted Dick With Custard' American Barleywine – Moon Dog Craft Brewery (VIC)
- 'The Marsellus Wallace' Porter – Duckstein Brewery (WA)
- 'Kill Patrick' Dry Stout – Black Hops Brewing (QLD)
- 'Velvet' Sour Beer – Homestead Brewery (WA)
- 'Pucker Up – Black Doris Bam'ba'Lambic Baltic Porter – Mike's Organic Brewery (NZ)
- 'Snickers' Brown Ale – 4 Pines Brewing Company (NSW)
- 'Bossa Nova Baby' Speciality IPA – Garage Project (NZ)
- 'Midnight in the Carpark of Good and Evil' Specialty Beer – Young Henrys (NSW)
- 'Almonds of Steal' Brown Ale – Mildura Brewery (VIC)
- 'Bourbon Old Fashion Cocktail Beer' Old Ale – Panhead Custom Ales (NZ)

Back to Top

=== 2014 ===
==== Attendance ====
Royal Exhibition Hall, Melbourne. 22–24 May 2014

- Attendance: 12,000 people

==== People's Choice Winner ====
- 'Praline' Belgian Ale (La Sirene, VIC)

==== Complete List of Festival Beers ====
Beer List
- 'Crème Caramel' Dessert Style Ice Beer (2 Brothers, VIC, 13%)
- 'red.RYE.low' American Rye Red Ale (4 Hearts, QLD, 2.9%)
- 'Gin and Juice – Snoop Dogg Tribute Ale' Flavour-Infused Golden Ale (4 Pines Brewing Company, NSW, 5.5%)
- 'White Rocket in Flight, Afternoon Delight' Belgian Farmhouse Wit with Rocket (7-cent, VIC, 5%)
- 'Rastafari Unchained' Barrel Aged, Brettanomyces Fermented Stout (8 Wired, NZ, 6%)
- 'Mallerstang' American Amber Ale (Adam Beauchamp/Birbeck's, SA, 6%)
- 'Land of Plenty – AIBA Collaborator' Kellerbier (Feral/2 Brothers/CUB, WA/VIC/VIC, 6%)
- 'Koji' Sake/beer hybrid (Australian Brewery, NSW, 5.8%)
- 'Betsy' Roasted Coconut and Vanilla Porter (All Inn, QLD, 5.2%)
- 'Sex, Drugs & Rocky Road' Rocky Road Dessert beer (Bacchus, QLD, 8.6%)
- 'Sticky Nipple' Milk Stout (Barossa Valley, SA, 5.8%)
- 'Baby Cham' Funky Saison (Beavertown, UK, 5.1%)
- 'Roflcopter' Grapefruit Farmhouse IPA (Behemoth, NZ, 6%)
- 'Kooringa' India Pale Lager (Birbeck's, SA, 6%)
- 'Black Eis' Weizen Eisbock (Black Heart, VIC, 13%)
- 'Dark Kolsck' Kolsch/Dunkel (Blackhorse, NSW, 4.5%)
- 'PB' Amber Ale (Bootleg, WA, 4%)
- '& J' Berliner Weisse (Thirsty Crow, NSW, 3%)
- 'Saison' Saison (Boatrocker, VIC, 6.4%)
- 'Pepper Steak Porter' Smoked Spiced Porter (BrewCult, VIC, 6%)
- 'Once Upon a Whisky Barrel There Lived a Funky Tripel' Whisky Barrel aged Belgian Tripel (Bridge Road, VIC, 9%)
- 'Battle of the Bulge' Occupied Belgium IPA (Bright, VIC, 7%)
- 'Dream Date' Dark Date Ale (Burleigh Brewing Company, QLD, 5.2%)
- 'Blood Stone' Red Ale (Buxton, UK, 4.2%)
- 'Fireface' Imperial Choc Chilli Schwartzbier (Byron Bay, NSW, 6.5%)
- 'Emperor Nero' Black India Pale Lager (Camden Town, UK, 5.8%)
- 'Belgian Stout' Belgian Stout (Cheeky Monkey, WA, 6%)
- 'O'Hara Irish Red' Irish Red (Clifton Hill, VIC, 4.6%)
- 'Coedonado' Barrel Aged Strong Beer (Coedo, JAPAN, 9.5%)
- 'Gary Lebron' Musk Saison (Colonial Brewing Company, WA, 5.8%)
- 'Kiwifruit Pils' Kiwifruit Pils (Croucher, NZ, 5.5%)
- 'Rocket Science' Planet of the Hops Triple IPA (Dennis, NSW, 11.9%)
- 'Electrolyte Forte' (Doctor's Orders, NSW, 7.5%)
- 'Vanilla Bean Framboise' Framboise (Duckstein, WA, 6%)
- 'Mulberry Bright Ale' Bright Ale with Berry Infusion (Eagle Bay, WA, 4.9%)
- 'Angry Pirate' Rum and Oak IPA (Edge, VIC, 6.5%)
- 'Slammer' Single-Hopped Pale Ale (EkiM, NSW, 6.3%)
- 'Endeavour Vintage – 2014 Seasonal Series' American Red Ale (Endeavour, NSW, 5.2%)
- 'Fitzroy Hipster Ale' Australian Pale Ale (Evil Twin, USA, 5.5%)
- 'pHunking Fresh' Wild Ale (Feral Brewing Company, WA, 6.5%)
- 'A Cure for Mad Dog Bites and Other Maladies' Porter (Gage Roads Brewing Company, WA, 5.8%)
- 'Umami Monster'Imperial Umami Ale (Garage Project, NZ, 9%)
- 'King Leopold's Ghost' Belgian Strong (Golden Bear, NZ, 7%)
- 'Wild Wood' Oaked Citra-Sauvin Pilsner (Golden Eagle, NZ, 5%)
- 'Go Figure' Ginger Beer with a twist (Grand Ridge, VIC, 4.5%)
- 'Wayfarer White' Belgian Witbier (Green Beacon Brewing Co., QLD, 4.5%)
- 'Primate' Banana Chocolate Stout (The Grifter, NSW, 5.5%)
- 'Midnight Cowboy Project' Sour Porter aged on cherries (Holgate Brewhouse, VIC, 6%)
- 'Brett the Bloody Orange' Barrel aged Brettanomyces Infected Blood Orange Saison (HopDog, NSW, 6.5%)
- 'Resin Dog' International IPA (Illawarra, NSW, 5.5%)
- 'Blonde' Belgian Blonde Ale (Indian Ocean, WA, 6%)
- 'Pitch Black' Stout with Orange (Invercargill, NZ, 5.8%)
- 'Red Bush' Rye Ale (Ironhouse, TAS, 5.5%)
- 'Where Strides the Behemoth' Cascadian Black Ale (KAIJU!, VIC, 11%)
- 'Japanese fruit tea infused rice lager' Rice Lager (Kooinda, VIC, 4.5%)
- 'Praline' Belgian Specialty Ale (La Sirene, VIC, 6%)
- 'The Brown Burn' Chilli Chocolate Brown Ale (Liberty, NZ, 6%)
- 'Breaking The Cardinal Rule' IPA Tripel (The Little Brewing Co, NSW, 9.5%)
- 'The SS Menno' Sour Beer (Little Creatures, WA, 6%)
- 'Red Red Wine...Ale' Red Ale brewed with grape juice and Nelson Sauvin hops (Lord Nelson, NSW, 4.8%)
- 'Circus of Sour' White Wine Barrel Aged Berliner Weisse (Magic Rock, UK, 3.5%)
- 'Roman Recess' IIPA brewed with wheat, rye, dried figs and fennel seed (Make Beer, VIC, 9.1%)
- 'Chocolate Mint Stout' Imperial Stout (Mash, WA, 10%)
- '30th Anniversary Ale' Red IPA (Matilda Bay, VIC, 6%)
- 'Roggen in the Rough' Rye Beer (McCashin's, NZ, 5%)
- 'White Coffee Stout' Wheat Beer (McLaren Vale, SA, 6%)
- 'mike's Hemp Bock' Traditional Bock (Mike's, NZ, 5%)
- 'Super Hopped American Dream' Hoppy Pilsner (Mikkeller, DENMARK, 4.6%)
- 'Winter Smoke' Smoked Porter (Mildura, VIC, 5.5%)
- 'Triple Dry Hopped Imperial Pilsner' Imperial Pilsner (Moa, NZ, 7.5%)
- 'Cold Drip War' Mischkaffee Dark Ale (Moon Dog, VIC, 6%)
- 'The Dark Monk' Belgian Black IPA (The Monk, WA, 7%)
- 'R'n'R' Porter (Mornington Peninsula, VIC, 7.3%)
- 'IPAison' IPA meets Saison (Morrison, TAS, 6%)
- 'Morktain Goat Jaffa Ale' Choc-Orange Black Ale (Mountain Goat, VIC, 5.2%)
- 'In Bloom' IPA (Murray's, NSW, 6%)
- 'Mad Dog' Wild Colonial Ale (The Mussel Inn, NZ, 5%)
- 'Copper Hopper' Hoppy Red Ale (Nail, WA, 6%)
- 'Old Fashion' Barrel Aged Strong Ale (Naked Monkey, WA, 8.9%)
- 'Triple Wood Knot Brown' Brown Ale (Nøgne Ø, DENMARK, 10%)
- 'Black Sabbath' Black Barley Wine (Panhead, NZ, 11%)
- 'DevilBird' Belgian Golden Strong Ale (ParrotDog, NZ, 8.4%)
- '640P' IPA (Pixel, NSW, 6.4%)
- 'Hefeweizen Steam Bock IPA' Weizen Bock (Prancing Pony, SA, 7%)
- 'Black Elderberry Bock' Bock (Prickly Moses, VIC, 6.2%)
- 'Forsaken' Red Saison/ Japanese Brown Ale (Red Duck, VIC, 6.1%)
- 'Wee Heavy Double Barrel Aged Scotch Ale' Strong Scotch Ale (Red Hill, VIC, 10%)
- 'Quiet Deeds Vanilla Porter' Porter (Red Island, VIC, 5.9%)
- 'Export Pilsner' New World NZ Hoppy Pilsner (Renaissance, NZ, 4.3%)
- 'Othello's Curse' Imperial Black IPA (Riverside, NSW, 9%)
- 'The Pickpocket' Apricot Wheat Beer (Rocks, NSW, 5%)
- 'Sideshow Sally' Blonde Ale (Sideshow, VIC, 4.7%)
- 'Koalafornia Dreamin' – Beer Camp #120) Imperial Brown Ale (Sierra Nevada, USA, 7.5%)
- 'Arabesque' Rye Amber Pilsner (Six String, NSW, 6%)
- '150% Citrus' Extra Super Special Hoppy IPA (Sixpoint, USA, 7.5%)
- 'Smokin' Pope IV' American Brown Ale (Southern Bay, VIC, 5.5%)
- 'She'll Be Right' Hoppy Brett Fermented Farmhouse Ale (Stillwater, USA, 6%)
- 'Scarlet Super' Fruit Lambic (Temple, VIC, 4%)
- 'Valravn' Imperial Black IPA (Thornbridge, UK, 8.8%)
- 'Saison Japon' Saison (Thunder Road, VIC, 5.8%)
- 'Shamelessly Barrel Aged' Belgian Strong Ale aged in oak barrels (To Øl, DENMARK, 10%)
- 'Union Square' UK style ESB (Townshend, NZ, 5.5%)
- 'Spicemarket' Sri Lankan Spiced Wit (True South, VIC, 5.8%
- 'LO-FI' American Pale Ale (Tuatara, NZ, 2.9%)
- 'Sesame Snap-chat' Brown Ale (Two Birds, VIC, 5.5%)
- 'Ned's Red' Flanders Red Ale (Van Dieman, TAS, 5%)
- 'Chockywocky Dopplebocky' Sour Cherry Smoked Cacao Dopplebock (Wayward, NSW, 8.5%)
- 'Jetcow' Belgian IPA (White Rabbit, VIC, 7%)
- 'Fish Fingers and Custard' WeeHeavy (Wig & Pen, ACT, 6%)
- 'The Paw Paw Negro Blowtorch' Mild Ale (Yeastie Boys, NZ, 4.2%)
- 'Mothers Ruin' Sahti (Young Henrys, NSW, 6.5%)

Back to Top

=== 2013 ===
==== Attendance ====
Royal Exhibition Hall, Melbourne. 24–26 May 2013

- Attendance: 11,000 people

==== People's Choice Winner ====
- White Chocolate and Raspberry Pilsner (Bacchus, QLD)

==== Complete List of Festival Beers ====
Beer List
- 'The Magic Pudding' Sticky Ale (2 Brothers, VIC, 9.5%)
- 'Black 55' American Black Pale Ale (3 Ravens, VIC, 5.5%)
- 'Cluster F@ck' Mild IPA (4 Hearts, QLD, 3.5%)
- 'Dunkel Monkey' Infused Double Dunkelweizen (4 Pines, NSW, 6.1%)
- 'Wet Willie' Wet Hop Harvest Ale (7 Cent, VIC, 7%)
- 'Merge Like a Zip' Imperial Black IPA (8 Wired, NZ, 9.5%)
- 'Frühstück rur dem Kaiser' (Breakfast for the Kaiser) Chocolate and Golden Naked Oat Breakfast Pilsner (The Australian Brewery, NSW, 5.5%)
- 'White Chocolate Raspberry Pilsner' (Bacchus, QLD, 4.9%)
- Daidai Pale Ale citrus fruit accented Pale Ale (Baird, JAPAN, 5.5%)
- 'Omega Centauri IPA' Dark Imperial IPA, (Barossa Valley, SA, 8.5%)
- 'The Merchant' Black mid-1800s style IPA, (Birbecks, SA, 7.2%)
- 'Myrtle's Bunga Bunga Party' Spiced Ale (Birra del Borgo, ITALY, 7.5%)
- 'The Full English'English IPA (Black Heart Brewery, VIC, 6.1%)
- Golden Ale English Ale (Blue Sky, QLD)
- 'Hop Bomb' American IPA, (Boatrocker, VIC)
- TBC (Bootleg, WA)
- 'Acid Freaks' Balsamic Baltic Porter (Brewcult, VIC, 7.5%)
- Grand Cru (Brooklyn Brewery, USA, 8.4%)
- 'Hop to it Honey' Honey IPA (Bridge Road, VIC, 6%)
- 'Supermucilaginisticexpialidocious' Oak Fermented Barleywine (Rye/Oat) (Bright Brewery, VIC, 10%)
- 'Hasslehop', Strong Pale Ale (Burleigh Brewing, QLD, 5%)
- 'Camden vs Alsace' Altbier with French hops (Camden Town Brewery, UK, 4.6%)
- Imperial Red Ale (Cheeky Monkey, WA, 7.6%)
- 'Gary the White' White Stout (Colonial, WA, 6.8%)
- 'Nuclear Free ANZUS' New World IPA, (Croucher, NZ, 5.9%)
- 'Intravenous Elixir' Barrel Aged Belgian Black IPA (Doctor's Orders, NSW, 7.7%)
- Porter (Duckstein, WA, 6%)
- NZ New World Wheat Ale (Edge, VIC, 6%)
- 2013 Hop Vintage 'Shipwrecked' Robust (Endeavour with Flat Rock Brew Café, NSW, 5.5%)
- 'Hoperotic' Belgian Ale (The Factory, VIC, 7.2%)
- 'Barrique O'Karma' Black, mildly hoppy and woody ale (Feral, WA, 6.5%)
- 'Free Range' (Feral/Wig & Pen for 2013 AIBA awards, WA/ ACT, 5.4%)
- 'Double Giant' Imperial English IPA with Belgian yeast and new world hops (Gage Roads, WA, 7.8%)
- 'Death from Above' Indochine Pale Ale (Garage Project, NZ, 7.5%)
- 'I Peach A' IPA made with peaches (Golden Bear, NZ, 6.8%)
- 'The Dark Side of Juniper' Dark Lager with juniper berries (Grand Ridge, VIC, 5.2%)
- 'Uppercut Round 1' Imperial IPA (Green Beacon, QLD, 7.5%)
- 'Mr Midnight' Black Rye Witbier (The Grifter, NSW, 5%)
- 'Spiced Imperial Chocolate Stout' Imperial Stout (Harbour, UK, 8.7%)
- 'An American Werewolf in Belgium' Belgian IPA (Hop Dog BeerWorks, NSW, 6.5%)
- 'French Kiss' Shiraz Barrel Aged Farmhouse Ale (Illawarra, NSW, 6.6%)
- 'Dark Lager' Vienna Lager (Indian Ocean, WA, 4.6%)
- 'Holy Smoke' Black IPA (Ironhouse, TAS, 7%)
- 'XXXXX'(James Squire, VIC)
- 'Mosaic American Pale Ale' American Pale Ale (Kooinda, VIC, 4.5%)
- 'Last Drop ESB' Extra Special Bitter (Last Drop, WA, 5%)
- 'C!tra Junior' 1/2IIPA (Liberty, NZ, 4.5%)
- 'Mad Abbot Christmas Ale' Belgian Spiced Christmas Ale (The Little Brewing Co, NSW, 11.5%)
- TBC (Little Creatures, WA)
- 'Black Eyed Rye' Dark Rye Ale (Lord Nelson, NSW, 5.2%)
- 'The Grasscutter' Lawnmower Ale (Mash, WA, 4.4%)
- 'Black Boris' Hoppy Peated Belgian Black (Matilda Bay, VIC, 7.5%)
- 'Great Oak' Red/Brown Ale (McCashin's, NZ, 5.6%)
- 'mike's Udderlicious' Sweet Milk Stout (Mike's, NZ, 5.5%)
- 'Moa Blackhops' Black IPA (Moa, NZ, 6%)
- 'Selvmordstokt' Cherry Wheat Porter (Moon Dog/Nøgne ø, VIC/NORWAY, 7.6%)
- 'Commonfolk' Imperial Brown (Mornington Peninsula, VIC, 6.5–7%)
- 'IPA' English IPA (Morrison, TAS, 6.2%)
- 'Andy's Reserve Amber Ale' Spiced Amber Ale (Mountain Goat, VIC, 4.5%)
- 'Cacao Cabana' Choc Brown Hefeweizen (The Monk/Eagle Bay, WA, 5.5%)
- 'International Rye Pale Ale' American Rye Pale Ale (Moylan's, USA, 5.4%)
- 'The Caveman' Smoked Belgio Dark Ale (Murray's, NSW, 6.2%)
- 'Bush Baby' New Zealand Bush Beer (The Mussel, Inn, NZ)
- 'Black Lager' Schwarzbier – gluten free (O'Brien, VIC)
- 'BloodyDingo' Imperial Red IPA (ParrotDog, NZ)
- 'Bjørn's Red "Ø1"' Danish Imperial Red Stout (Pinchgut, NSW)
- 'Black Stallion' Barrel Aged Imperial Stout (Prickly Moses, VIC)
- 'Orange Mosaic' Single Hop Belgian Fruit Wit (Red Duck, VIC)
- 'Centennial Men' Single Hopped American Pale Ale (Red Duck/Victorian Homebrewing Champion, VIC)
- 'Festbier' Märzen (Red Hill, VIC)
- 'Enlightenment' Double Oaked Scotch Ale on Rye (Renaissance Brewing, NZ)
- 'Breakfast by the River' Smoked Coffee Porter (Riverside Brewing, NZ)
- 'Return of the Red Eye IPA' IPA (Sierra Nevada, USA)
- 'Chai Porter' Spiced Ale / Chai Spiced Porter (Six String, NSW)
- 'Le Petit Tronc avec Pêche' Fruit / Vegetable Beer (Southern Bay, VIC)
- 'Winter Sun' Winter Warmer – English Style (Stefano's Mildura Brewery, VIC)
- 'Warthog' Dry-hopped US Style Porter (Summer Wine, UK)
- 'Stormy Winter's Morning Rise' Single Hop Oatmeal IPA (Sydney Brewery, NSW, 6.5%)
- 'Scarlet Super' Sour Wheat Beer with Cranberries and Hibiscus Flowers (Temple, VIC, 5%)
- 'Charlie's Pitbull' Oak Aged American Stout (Thirsty Crow/William Bull, NSW, 8.2%)
- 'Colorado Red' UK/American Style Red Ale (Thornbridge, UK, 5.9%)
- 'Hop Star' Extra Pale Ale (Thunder Road, VIC, 5.2%)
- 'Riwaka Ale' Ordinary Bitter (Townshend, NZ, 3.7%)
- 'Killer Python' Kölsch (True South, VIC, 4.8%)
- 'Taco' Hoppy Wheat beer with corn, coriander leaf and lime (Two Birds, VIC, 5.2%)
- 'Dubbel Shot' Belgian Coffee Dubbel (Van Dieman, TAS, 6.6%)
- 'Saizen' Eurasian Summer Saison (Wayward, NSW, 4.2%)
- 'Teddywidder' Berliner Weisse (White Rabbit, VIC, 3.5%)
- 'Golden Age of Bloodshed' Heavily-Beeted Belgian Blond (Yeastie Boys, NZ, 6.5%)
- 'Divine Manchu' Kombucha Beer (Young Henrys, NSW, 1.5%)
- 'Schwarz Ale' German Black Ale (2012 Australian Homebrewing Champion, NSW, 5.1%)

Back to Top

=== 2012 ===
==== Attendance ====
Royal Exhibition Hall, Melbourne.

==== People's Choice Winner ====
- 'Gunnamatta' Tea Leaf IPA (Yeastie Boys, NZ)

==== Complete List of Festival Beers ====
Beer List
- ‘Barrel aged Scotch Ale’ (Renaissance, NZ, 7%)
- ‘Imperial Chilli Pilsner’ (Emerson's, NZ, 5.2%)
- ‘Taranaki Rose’ IPA (mike's, NZ)
- ‘Chilli Stout’ (Invercargill, NZ)
- ‘Gunnamatta’ Tea Leaf IPA (Yeastie Boys, NZ, 6%)
- 'Double Day of the Dead' Strong Black Lager (Garage Project, NZ, 8%)
- ‘Smoked Manuka Ale’ (Mussel Inn, NZ, 5%)
- ‘ANZUSPA’ (Croucher, NZ, 2.5%)
- ‘Double Brown Ale with coffee (8 Wired, NZ, 8%)
- TBC (Epic, NZ)
- ‘S!mcoe Imperial IPA’ (Liberty, NZ, 8%)
- ‘West Coast DIPA’ (Golden Bear, NZ, 6.5%)
- ‘Double APA’ – TBC (Tuatara, NZ)
- ‘Chocolate Wheat Beer’ (Moa, NZ, 5.5%)
- 'Zesty Wit' Kiwi fruit infused Witbier (Harringtons, NZ)
- English Pale Ale with 100% NZ ingredients (Townshend, NZ, 4%)
- ‘Rum Weizen’ (Mash Collective, NSW)
- White IPA (Doctors Orders, NSW, 7.5%)
- Beetroot Belgian Ale (4 Pines, NSW)
- American Brown Ale (Lord Nelson, NSW)
- Red Pilzner (Pinchgut, NSW, 4.8%)
- Pine Needle Ale (St Peters, NSW, 4.6%)
- Porter (Little Brewing Co, NSW)
- 'Bobs Farmhouse Ale' Oak Aged Farmhouse Ale (Murrays, NSW, 8%)
- ‘Children of Darkness’ Barrel aged Black IPA (Hop Dog, NSW)
- Rouge Saison (Illawarra, NSW)
- Dunkelweiss (Burleigh, QLD, 5%)
- "Sour Blonde" (Wig & Pen, ACT, 4.5%)
- Special Bitter (Cowaramup, WA, 4.6%)
- Dunkelweizen (Last Drop, WA)
- Coffee Stout (Mash, WA, 4.5%)
- American Oatmeal Stout (Nail, WA)
- 'The Little Rabbit' Belgian Pale Ale (Little Creatures/White Rabbit, WA/VIC, 6.2%)
- American Black IPA (Bootleg, WA, 5.8%)
- Watermelon Berliner Weiss (Feral, WA, 2.9%)
- Sweet Potato Porter (The Monk, WA)
- Wooded barley wine (2 Brothers, VIC, 9.5%)
- Farmhouse/Saison TBC (Mountain Goat, VIC)
- Imperial Pilsner (Bridge Road, VIC)
- Sarsaparilla Stout (Grand Ridge, VIC, 4%)
- Belgian Karakaberry Ale (Kooinda, VIC, 5.7%)
- Farmhouse Ale (Hickinbotham, VIC, 5.85%)
- Pilsner (Thunder Road Brewing, VIC)
- Grisette Ale (Hargreaves Hill, VIC, 4%)
- Russian Imperial Stout (Matilda Bay, VIC)
- Aotearoa S.M.A.S.H California Common (Boatrocker, VIC, 5%)
- Smoked Weisse Bier (Temple, VIC)
- Coconut Porter (True South, VIC, 6%)
- India Red Ale (Bright, VIC)
- Sticke Alt (Red Hill, VIC)
- 'ChainSAW' Stella Australian Wheat Beer (Otway, VIC, 4.7%)
- Honey Amber Ale (Red Duck, VIC, 5.5%)
- Australian Brown Ale (Barry Cranston – Australian Homebrewer 2011 – brewed at Bridge Road, VIC)
- Unfiltered Belgian Blonde (Holgate, VIC, 6%)
- Imperial American Amber Ale (Mornington Peninsula, VIC, 9%)
- Wild/Sour Ale (Moondog, VIC, 5%)
- Double Dubbel English IPA (Lobethal/Steam Exchange, SA)
- Foreign Extra Stout (McLaren Vale, SA, 5.5%)
- 'Cowboy' Belgo (Moo Brew, TAS, 4.5%)
- Black Elephant Black Belgian Abbey Ale (Seven Sheds, TAS, 6.3%)

Back to Top

== See also ==
- Beer in Australia
- List of breweries in Australia
- Australian International Beer Awards
