= List of breweries in Australia =

Beer production in Australia has traditionally been dominated by regional producers. Since the 1980s, there have been a steady stream of takeovers and amalgamations, and now the two major producers (who were once Australian-owned) are Carlton & United Breweries (CUB) and Lion.

In December 2011, CUB became a subsidiary of British multinational SABMiller (the world's then-second-largest international brewing company) and in October 2016 CUB became 100% owned by AB InBev the world's largest brewing company, based in Belgium. AB InBev then sold CUB to Japanese company Asahi Breweries on 1 June 2020.

Since October 2009, Lion has been a subsidiary of Japanese brewer, Kirin Company a brewing company established in 1885. The largest remaining Australian owned brewer is Coopers Brewery with a market share of about 4% of total beer volume sales in Australia.

The two foreign-owned companies accounted for 89% of beer volume sales in 2011, with CUB's market share at 48% (declining from a 55% market share in 2006) and Lion at 41% (increasing from 37%).

In May 2012 the dominant Australian-produced beers were XXXX Gold, which accounted for 12.4% of all beer consumed in Australia, VB, with 12.3%, Carlton Draught 9.3%, Tooheys New 7.1%, Tooheys Extra Dry 4.4% and Carlton Mid 3.8%.

== Breweries owned by major companies ==
Owned By	Australian Subsidiary	Brewery	Location(s)	Estab.	Main Beers / Notes
Asahi Group Holdings	Carlton & United Breweries	Carlton & United Breweries	Abbotsford, Victoria & Yatala, Queensland	1907	
Asahi Group Holdings	Carlton & United Breweries	Cascade Brewery	Hobart, Tasmania	1824	
Asahi Group Holdings	Carlton & United Breweries	Matilda Bay Brewing Company	Healesville, Victoria	1984	Australia's first craft brewery, originally established in Fremantle. In 1990 it was purchased by Carlton & United Breweries who subsequently closed the Western Australian brewery. 'Grand Champion' and 'Champion Large Brewery' at the 2008 Australian International Beer Awards.
Asahi Group Holdings	Carlton & United Breweries	Balter Brewing Company	Currumbin, Queensland	2016	Balter Brewing are a Gold Coast based brewery that was acquired by Carlton & United Breweries on 5 December 2019. Their awards include Best Newcomer and Champion Medium Australian Brewery at the 2017 Australian International Beer Awards and Champion Large Australian Brewery in 2019.
Asahi Group Holdings	Carlton & United Breweries	4 Pines	Manly, New South Wales	2008	Winner of 'Champion Large Australian Brewery' at the 2015 Australian International Beer Awards. 4 Pines announced on 22 September 2017 that they had been purchased by AB InBev.
Asahi Group Holdings	Carlton & United Breweries	Pirate Life Brewing	Port Adelaide, South Australia	2014	The award-winning South Australian brewery was purchased by AB InBev on 30 November 2017.
Asahi Group Holdings		Mountain Goat Beer	Richmond, Victoria	1997	Mountain Goat Beer was purchased by Asahi in September 2015 and is therefore no longer an independent owned microbrewery. They have won many local awards including Champion Australian Beer at the 2015 Australian International Beer Awards.
Asahi Group Holdings		Green Beacon Brewing Co.	Teneriffe, Queensland & Geebung, Queensland	2013	Green Beacon was purchased by Asahi on 21 August 2019. Green Beacon was named 2017 Champion Small Australian Brewery and 2018 Champion Medium Australian Brewery at the Australian International Beer Awards.
Kirin Company	Lion	J. Boag & Sons (orig. Esk Brewery)	Launceston, Tasmania	1883 (1881)	
Kirin Company	Lion	Castlemaine Perkins	Milton, Queensland	1878	
Kirin Company	Lion	Hahn Brewery	Auburn, New South Wales	1988	
Kirin Company	Lion	Malt Shovel Brewery	Camperdown, New South Wales	1998	Part of Lion, famous for the James Squires range and Orchard Crush cider. Also brews Malt Shovel Brewers (once named Mad Brewers) and Kosciuszko Pale Ale.
Kirin Company	Lion	South Australian Brewing Company	Thebarton, South Australia	1859	West End Brewery, founded 1859 closed 1980. Thebarton "Southwark" brewery closed in June 2021.
Kirin Company	Lion	Swan Brewery	Thebarton, South Australia	1837	Brewery was previously in Canning Vale, Western Australia
Kirin Company	Lion	Tooheys	Lidcombe, New South Wales	1869	
Kirin Company	Lion	Little Creatures Brewery	Fremantle, Western Australia & Geelong, Victoria	2000	In 2012 the company became part of Lion.
Kirin Company	Lion	White Rabbit Brewery	Geelong, Victoria	2009	Originally owned by Little World Beverages, in 2012 the company became part of Lion. In 2015 the Healesville brewery was closed and production moved to Geelong. Beer range includes White Ale, Dark Ale & Pale Ale. The White Ale was named 2017 Champion Australian Beer at the Australian International Beer Awards.
Kirin Company	Lion	Stone & Wood Brewing Co.	Byron Bay, New South Wales	2008	Originally owned by Fermentum, Stone and Wood was purchased by Lion on 9 September 2021. Winner of 'Champion Large Australian Brewery' at the 2016 Australian International Beer Awards
Kirin Company	Lion	Two Birds Brewing	Spotswood, Victoria	2011	Australia's first Female owned and operated brewery founded by Jayne Lewis and Danielle Allen. Initially sold to Fermentum in January 2021 and later onsold to Lion when the Fermentum family of brands were acquired by Lion on 9 September 2021. Winner of 'Champion Medium Sized Australian Brewery' at the 2016 Australian International Beer Awards.
Cooper Family		Coopers Brewery	Regency Park, South Australia	1862	
Coca-Cola Europacific Partners	Australian Beer Co	Yenda Brewing Company	Yenda, New South Wales	2013	
Coca-Cola Europacific Partners		Feral Brewing Company	Baskerville, Western Australia	2002	Feral was named as 2009 'Grand Champion' and 2012 'Champion Large Australian Brewery' at the Australian International Beer Awards. It was announced on 12 October 2017 that it had been fully acquired by Coca-Cola Amatil.
Bickford's Australia / Vok Beverages		Vale Brewing	Willunga, South Australia	2008	Vale Brewing was originally established as the McLaren Vale Beer Company before becoming Vale Brewing. In 2010 their Vale Ale was the winner of the GABS Hottest 100 Aussie Craft Beers of the Year. They also brew beers under the Fox Hat Brewing label. They were purchased in October 2017 by beverage company, Bickford's Australia.

== Microbreweries ==
A microbrewery, or craft brewery, is a modern brewery which produces a limited amount of beer, usually with an orientation toward distinctive and flavourful products. In Australia, there is no strict definition for a microbrewery; however, the definition for membership of the Independent Brewers Association provides a fair guide that could be considered appropriate. That is, a brewer sells less than 40 million litres of beer per annum and is not more than 20% owned by a brewer that produces more than 40 million litres of beer per annum anywhere in the world.

The following is a list of notable microbreweries in Australia, listed alphabetically. In July 2017, there were approximately 500 small breweries in Australia.

Name	Location(s)	Estab.	Notes
Ballistic Beer Co	Salisbury, Queensland	2016	Named after the local area's munition factory history of WWII, they won 3 Gold at the 2017 Australian International Beer Awards
Batch Brewing Company	Marrickville, New South Wales	2013	Placed 15th in top craft breweries in Australia in the 2018 Beer Cartel Craft Beer Survey. Key beers; West Coast IPA, Just Beer, Elsie the Milk Stout.
Bentspoke Brewing Co	Canberra, Australian Capital Territory	2014	In March 2019 Bentspoke won two medals at the International Brewing Awards in London, a gold medal for their "Barley Griffin" Pale Ale and a silver medal for their "Crankshaft" IPA. This was the second time in a row that Bentspoke had been awarded a gold and a silver medal at the show.
Bootleg Brewery	Margaret River, Western Australia	1994	
Broo Brewery	Sorrento, Victoria	2009	Producers of Broo Premium Lager and Australia Draught - marketed as 100% Australian owned and manufactured.
Burleigh Brewing Company	Burleigh Heads, Queensland	2006	Gold Medal winner at the 2012 World Beer Cup in the category 'South German-Style Hefeweizen/Hefeweissbier'.
Capital Brewing Company	Fyshwick, Australian Capital Territory	September 2016	Winner of the 'Champion Small Brewery' at the 2016, and the 'Champion International Small Brewery' and 'Champion Australasian Brewery' at the 2017 Australian International Beer Awards.
Colonial Brewing Company	Margaret River, Western Australia	2004	Winner of the 'Champion Small Brewery' at the 2006, and the 'Champion International Small Brewery' and 'Champion Australasian Brewery' at the 2007 Australian International Beer Awards.
Gage Roads Brewing Company	Palmyra, Western Australia	2005	One of Australia's largest independently owned craft breweries, although in 2009 Woolworths acquired a 25% stake in the company. In 2016 Woolworths was bought out of its 25% via a capital raising.
Holgate Brewhouse	Woodend, Victoria	1999	Winner of the Premier's Trophy for Best Victorian Beer at the 2008 Australian International Beer Awards.
Lobethal Bierhaus	Lobethal, South Australia	2007	
Mash Brewing Company	Henley Brook, Western Australia	1998	Winner of 'Champion Australian Beer' at the 2014 Australian International Beer Awards.
Mountain Culture Beer Co.	Katoomba, New South Wales	2019	Winner of GABS Hottest #1 2022, 2023, 2024 with Status Quo, first brewery to win the GABS Hottest #1 on debut, Highest Rated brewery on Untappd, Winner of NSW Favourite Brewery Venue 2023.
Moo Brew	Hobart, Tasmania	2005	Located at the site of the Museum of Old and New Art.
Nail Brewing	Bassendean, Western Australia	2000	Producers of the world's most expensive beer, the Antarctic Nail Ale.
Newstead Brewing Co.	Newstead, Queensland	2013	Winners of Champion Specialty Beer at the 2015 Craft Beer Industry Association Awards for their 3 Quarter Time Session Ale
Port Dock Brewery Hotel	Port Adelaide, South Australia	1986	Historic 1855 hotel closed in 1909 and reopened in 1986 as a brewpub. New microbrewery added in 2007.
Stockade Brew Co	Sydney, New South Wales	2015	Winner of Worlds Best Imperial Stout at the World Beer Awards.
The Mill Brewery	Collingwood, Victoria	2016	Originally founded in a nearby warehouse, the brewery moved into the recently closed Bendigo Hotel in 2024.
Thunder Road Brewing Company	Brunswick, Victoria	2011	Winner of 'Champion Medium Sized Australian Brewery' at 2014 and 2015 Australian International Beer Awards.
Wilson Brewing Co	Albany, Western Australia	2013	Their original brewery was founded in a converted nursery on the South Coast Highway, before relocating to the iconic White Star Hotel in 2024.
Young Henrys	Newtown, New South Wales	2012	

== See also ==
- Beer and breweries by region
