= Capital Brewing Company =

Brewery in Canberra, Australia

Coordinates: 35.2730°S 149.1319°E

- Type: Private
- Industry: Alcoholic beverage
- Founded: September 2016
- Founder: Tom Hertel; Laurence Kain
- Headquarters: Fyshwick, Canberra, Australian Capital Territory
- Products: Beer
- Owner: Tom Hertel; Laurence Kain
- Website: capitalbrewing.co

Capital Brewing Company (also known as Capital Brewing Co.) is an Australian brewery. It was founded in 2016 by brewers Tom Hertel and Laurence Kain, and has a brewpub in the Canberra suburb of Fyshwick.

It is one of the largest craft brewers in Australia. It was previously the beer sponsor of the Greater Western Sydney Giants, which represent the Australian Capital Territory in the Australian Football League.

== Awards and activism ==
In 2021, two of the brewery's beers (Capital XPA and Coast Ale) were voted in the top 10 craft beers in the annual GABS Hottest 100 Craft Beers competition.

In April 2022, Capital Brewing Co. became the first Australian brewery to be certified as carbon neutral.

In 2023, the company announced it would plant a native Australian tree for every goal scored by the Greater Western Sydney Giants, as part of its 'Kick a Goal, Plant a Tree' initiative.

== See also ==
- Beer in Australia
- List of breweries in Australia
