= Mountain Culture Beer Co =

Australian craft brewery

- Location: Katoomba, New South Wales
- Opened: October 2019; 6 years ago
- Annual production volume: 3+ million litres (as at November 2024)
- Owner: DJ and Harriet McCready
- Website: mountainculture.com.au

Mountain Culture Beer Co is an Australian independent craft brewery based in the Blue Mountains, New South Wales. Founded in 2019 by husband-and-wife team DJ and Harriet McCready, the brewery is best known for its flagship beer, "Status Quo" Pale Ale, which was voted Australia's number one craft beer in the GABS Hottest 100 Aussie Craft Beers poll for four consecutive years (2022–2025).

In addition to its original brewpub in Katoomba, the company operates a large-scale production facility and taproom in Emu Plains, as well as venues in Redfern, Richmond, and Hobart.

== History ==
Mountain Culture was established in October 2019 by DJ McCready, an American brewer formerly of Oskar Blues Brewery (USA) and Modus Operandi Brewing (Sydney), and Harriet McCready, a former media professional. The brewery's original site was a converted Civic Video store in downtown Katoomba.

Shortly after opening, the business faced significant challenges, including the 2019–20 Australian bushfire season which severely impacted tourism in the Blue Mountains, followed by the COVID-19 pandemic in Australia. These events forced the brewery to pivot rapidly from a hospitality-focused model to packaging its beer in cans for online sales and national distribution.

In 2022, to meet growing demand, Mountain Culture opened a larger production brewery and taproom in Emu Plains, Western Sydney. The facility increased the company's brewing capacity to approximately 8 million litres per year.

In 2024, Australian cricket captain Pat Cummins became an investor in the brewery. The following year, Mountain Culture acquired the venues of Fox Friday Brewing, facilitating its expansion into Victoria and Tasmania.

== Locations ==
Mountain Culture operates five venues across three states:

- Katoomba: The original brewpub located in the Blue Mountains, focusing on limited-release small-batch beers.
- Emu Plains: The main production facility and taproom located at the foot of the Blue Mountains.
- Redfern: The company's first inner-city venue in Sydney, opened in November 2024 in the former premises of Atomic Brewery.
- Richmond (VIC): Located in Melbourne, this venue opened in July 2025 following the acquisition of the site from Fox Friday.
- Hobart (TAS): A taproom on Murray Street, opened in August 2025.

== Beers ==
Mountain Culture is noted for its focus on hop-forward American-style ales, particularly Hazy IPAs and New England Pale Ales (NEPA).

=== Status Quo ===
The brewery's most prominent beer is "Status Quo", a 5.2% ABV New England Pale Ale. It has achieved significant critical and popular success, most notably "four-peating" the number one position in the GABS Hottest 100 Aussie Craft Beers poll in 2022, 2023, 2024 and 2025. It was the first beer from a debut brewery to top the list in its first year of eligibility.

== Awards and recognition ==
=== GABS Hottest 100 Aussie Craft Beers ===
- #1 Place: 2022, 2023, 2024, 2025 (Status Quo Pale Ale)

=== Australian Liquor Industry Awards ===
- Executive of the Year (Consumer & Lifestyle): DJ McCready (2025)

=== Beer and Brewer Awards ===
- Best New Brewery (2020)

== See also ==
- Beer in Australia
- List of breweries in Australia
- Great Australian Beer Spectapular
