= Lobethal Bierhaus =

Australian restaurant and brewery

Coordinates: 34.907266°S 138.872906°E

- Industry: Alcoholic beverage
- Founded: 26 May 2007; 19 years ago
- Headquarters: 3A Main street, Lobethal, South Australia,
- Products: Beer
- Owner: Alistair Turnbull & Phil Jones
- Website: http://www.bierhaus.com.au

The Lobethal Bierhaus is an Australian family-owned microbrewery in the Adelaide Hills, located in former Onkaparinga Woollen Mills in Lobethal. It was established by Alistair Turnbull, a former banking executive, and opened for business on 26 May 2007.

The operation includes a small all-grain brewery (12 hecto-litre brew length) with accompanying cellar door tasting facilities, off-license bottle sales and a restaurant with matching beer themed foods built around local produce.

Lobethal Bierhaus gets its German influence from being located the Adelaide Hills region, which was settled by German migrants during the 1800s. Part of its name, Bierhaus, is the combination of German words (Bier beer + Haus house).

== See also ==
- Australian pub
- Beer in Australia
- List of breweries in Australia
- South Australian food and drink
