= Bentspoke Brewing Co =

Canberra-based brewing company

Coordinates: 35.2730°S 149.1319°E

BentSpoke Brewing Co
- Industry: Alcoholic beverage
- Founded: June 2014
- Headquarters: 38 Mort St, Braddon, Canberra, ACT
- Products: Beer
- Owner: Richard Watkins, Tracy Margrain
- Website: http://www.bentspokebrewing.com.au

BentSpoke Brewing Co is a Canberra-based brewing company initially founded as a Brewpub in 2014 by brewers Richard Watkins and Tracy Margrain. BentSpoke now supports both a Brewpub in the central Canberra suburb of Braddon, and a commercial brewing and canning facility in the Canberra light-industrial estate of Mitchell. BentSpoke's commercially available canned beers sport a bike theme (as does the company's name).

BentSpoke have historically performed well in the yearly Australian GABS Hottest 100 Aussie Craft Beers of the Year awards, with their Crankshaft IPA taking out the top spot in both 2020 and 2021, as well as third place in 2017, 2018, 2019, 2022 and 2023. BentSpoke's Crankshaft has been voted Australia's #1 IPA in GABS continuously since 2015.

They were also the only Australian brewery to secure a champion's trophy at the 2019 and 2024 International Brewing Awards.

In 2019 BentSpoke partnered with the Canberra Innovation Network to brew The Innovator, a sustainable beer incorporating wild yeast, pear juice and dried edible insects (crickets and black soldier fly larvae) "aiming to highlight innovation and test the possibilities of brewing using local and environmentally friendly ingredients".

== Beers ==
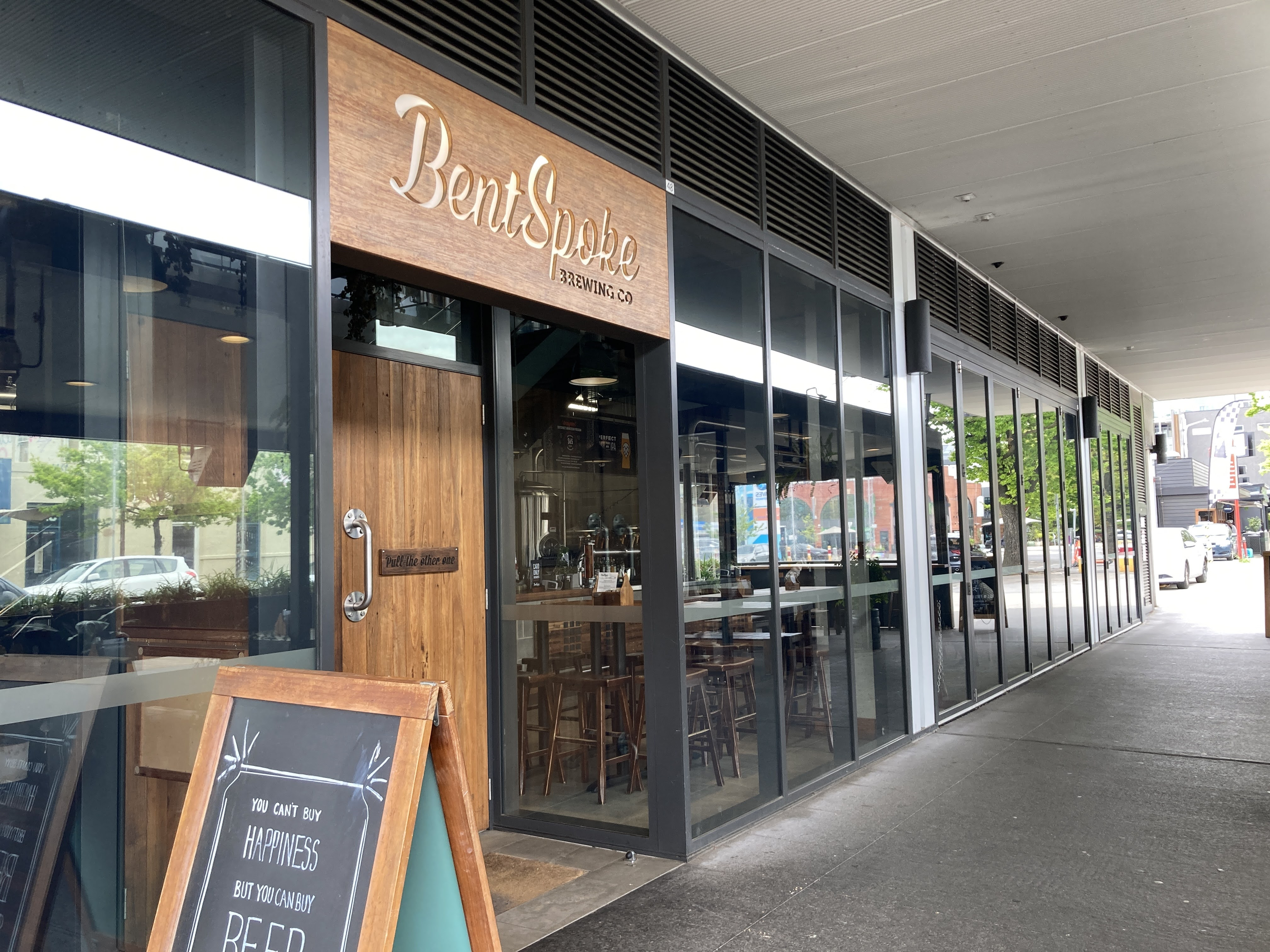
The Bentspoke pub in Braddon, ACT

- "Crankshaft" IPA (5.8% alc/vol)
- "Barley Griffin" Canberra Pale Ale (4.2% alc/vol)
- "Sprocket" IPA (6.7% alc/vol)
- "Red Nut" Red IPA (7.0% alc/vol)
- "Cluster 8" Imperial IPA (8.8% alc/vol)
- "Big Nut" Black IPA (7.0% alc/vol)

BentSpoke also produce a number of seasonal beers such as the "Flemm" Flanders Red Ale (5.0% alc/vol) and the "Descent" Russian Imperial Stout (15+% alc/vol).

== Awards ==
In March 2019, BentSpoke won two medals at the International Brewing Awards in London, a gold medal for their "Barley Griffin" Pale Ale and a silver medal for their "Crankshaft" IPA. This was the second consecutive time that BentSpoke had been awarded a gold and a silver medal at the show.

In May 2019, BentSpoke's "Barley Griffin" Pale Ale was also awarded the "Small Pack Ale Champion's Trophy" at the International Brewing Awards.

In May 2021, BentSpoke's "Sprocket" IPA was awarded the "Best Traditional IPA Trophy" at the Australian International Beer Awards.

== See also ==
- Beer in Australia
- List of breweries in Australia
