= Invercargill Brewery =

Former brewery in Invercargill, New Zealand

- Interactive map of Invercargill Brewery
- Location: 72 Leet Street, Invercargill, New Zealand
- Coordinates: 46°24′26.79″S 168°20′56.61″E
- Opened: 1999
- Closed: 2019
- Key people: Steve Nally

Invercargill Brewery was the southernmost brewer of beer in New Zealand. It was established by Steve Nally in 1999 near Invercargill.

Nally, who has a degree in chemistry, is a self-trained brewer who was an early adopter of distinct New Zealand flavours. He made an early commitment to using locally sourced ingredients at Invercargill and was one of the first craft brewers to use Gladfield malt from Dunsandel.

Invercargill's first beer was an English-style pale ale IBS that was rebranded as Stanley Green in 2006.

In 2000, Invercargill released Pitch Black stout - a malt driven style, designed to match the Bluff Oyster. The stout was said to stand out in a market where hop bitterness was becoming dominant.

In 2001, Invercargill developed Biman for a local curry restaurant.

In 2006, Invercargill Brewery upsized to a 1200-litre batch and moved to 8 Wood Street, Invercargill when Nally's interest in creating new flavours was given freer rein.

In 2007, Invercargill developed Strong New Zealand Pilsner. This pilsner beer has the distinctive flavour of the new varietals developed by the New Zealand Hop Board, originally known as b-saaz and d-saaz, later marketed as Motueka and Riwaka. Also in 2007, Invercargill launched New Zealand's first commercial Manuka smoked beer - Smokin' Bishop. It won a medal at the New Zealand Beer Awards that year. It was later included in the book 1001 Beers You Must Taste Before You Die. It proved so popular it became the brewery's first winter seasonal beer.

In 2008 Invercargill released Boysenbeery - a deeply hued fruit beer which also won a best in class at its Beer Awards debut. It was adopted as a summer seasonal beer. That same year, Biman received the trophy for Best New Zealand Style Beer. Biman was mentioned in Ben McFarland's book World's Best Beers The beer was rebranded as b.man to clarify pronunciation.

By 2008, Invercargill had diversified into contract brewing to better utilise its plant. One of its first clients was Yeastie Boys. In 2014. Invercargill upscaled to a 2500litre plant and moved production to 72 Leet Street.

In 2014, Nally received the Morton Coutts Trophy for Innovation by The New Zealand Brewers Guild for his invention of a box packaging system for beer.

The company went into receivership in 2018 and ceased production the following year.

== Products ==
- Stanley Green Pale Ale
- Nally's Cider
- Wasp Honey Pilsner
- B.man Strong New Zealand Pilsner
- Pitch Black Stout
- Pitch Black Imperial Stout
- Pitch Black Orange Stout

Seasonal brews

- Smokin' Bishop Smoked Bock
- Boysenbeery Fruit Beer
- Sa!son Belgium Farmhouse Ale
- Mennenskurrts Strong Scotch Ale
