= Holgate Brewhouse =

Brewery in Woodend, Victoria, Australia

Coordinates: 37°21′25″S 144°31′37″E

- Industry: Alcoholic beverage
- Founded: 1999; 27 years ago
- Headquarters: Woodend, Victoria; Australia
- Products: Beer
- Owner: Independent
- Website: http://www.holgatebrewhouse.com

Holgate Brewhouse is a small, independent, family-owned brewery in Woodend, Victoria, Australia. The brewery operations began in 1999 and were moved to the Keatings Hotel in 2005, where the Brewhouse also operates a restaurant and hotel. Holgate beers are available in bottles and on tap throughout the Melbourne area.

Their beers have consistently won accolades at the Australian International Beer Awards, including gold medals for the Mt Macedon Ale and Pilsner, as well as the 2008 Premier's Trophy for Best Victorian Beer for the Big Reg Lager.

== See also ==
- Australian pub
- Beer in Australia
- List of breweries in Australia
