= Gage Roads Brew Co =

Australian brewery

- Industry: Alcoholic beverage
- Founded: 2002
- Headquarters: 14 Absolon Street, Palmyra, Western Australia
- Products: Beer
- Production output: 2005 onwards
- Owner: Good Drinks Australia Ltd
- Website: gageroads.com.au

Gage Roads Brew Co (formerly Gage Roads Brewing Company) is an Australian craft brewery located just outside the city of Fremantle in Palmyra, Western Australia. It is one of Australia's largest independent breweries. In 2016, its new-world pale ale - "Little Dove" - was awarded the Trophy for Champion Australian Beer at the 2016 Australian International Beer Awards. In 2015, it was runner-up Champion Large Brewery at the Australian International Beer Awards.

== History ==
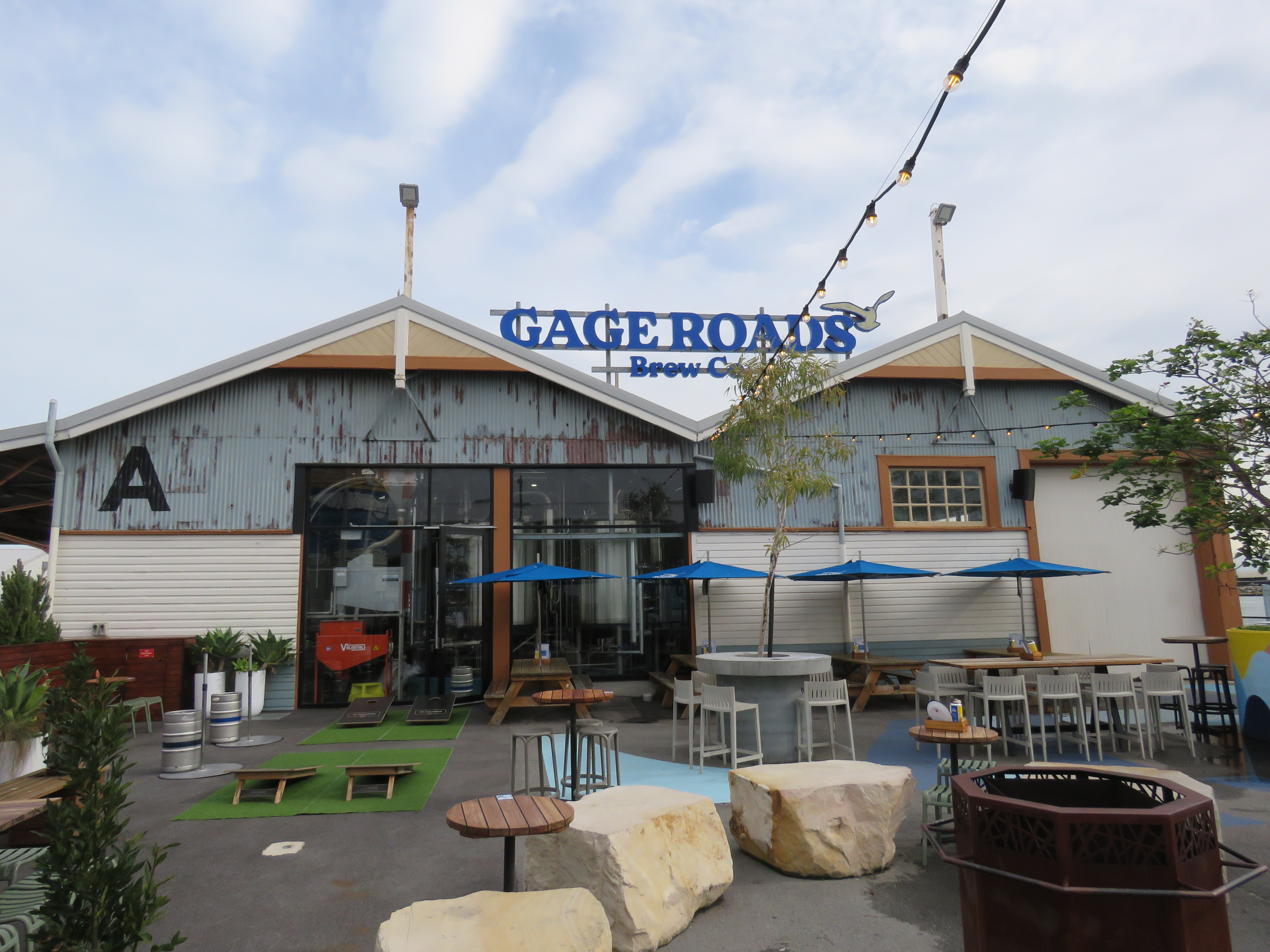
Eastern end of Gage Roads Brewery in 2024

Gage Roads was founded by Bill Hoedemaker, John Hoedemaker and Peter Nolin in 2002. The brewery is named after Gage Roads, a roadstead in the Indian Ocean between Fremantle and Rottnest Island off the coast of Western Australia.

Gage Roads was listed on the ASX (stock code: GRB) in 2006 and remains Australia's only remaining listed brewery. In 2009, the Woolworths conglomerate acquired a 25 per cent share in the brewer for $2 million. The investment allowed Gage Roads to purchase a state-of-the-art 100 hectolitre brewhouse from German manufacturer Krones, with its installation increasing capacity to 2.2 million cases per annum.

In 2015 the brewer executed a comprehensive refresh of its core craft beers, adding three new beers to its year-round lineup. The refresh proved to be extremely successful, with increased sales now making Gage Roads one of the largest craft brewers in Australia. In late 2016, Gage Roads bought-back Woolworths' 25 per cent stake, returning the company to independence.

== Beers ==
Year-round craft beers
| Beer | Style | Description |
|---|---|---|
| Single Fin (formerly known as South Beach) | Summer ale | Big, fresh tropical fruit aroma with light body and refreshing bitterness. 4.5% ABV, 25 IBU |
| Air Time | Low Carb Lager | Crisp and refreshing, low carbs. A herbal, earthy and floral Aroma. 4% ABV, 10 IBU |
| Pipe Dreams | Coastal Lager | Crisp, clean and refreshing, with a zesty citrus aroma and smooth bitterness. Brewed with water, hops, yeast and malt. 4.2% ABV, 20 IBU |
| Side Track | XPA | Aromas of fresh citrus, tropical fruit and a hint of pine. Light malt base for smooth body and crisp bitterness for extreme drinkability. A mid-strength beer. 3.5% ABV, 24 IBU |
| Hazy As | Hazy Pale Ale | Aroma of Passionfruit, pineapple and zesty citrus. 5% ABV, 25 IBU |
| Yeah Buoy | Non-Alc XPA | Tropical aromas of papaya, peach and apricot. Medium bodied. 0.5% ABV, 14 IBU |
| Pinky's Sunset | Pink Lady Cider | Crisp and refreshingly tart with lower sugar. Vegan friendly and gluten free. 4.5% ABV |
| Little Dove (discontinued) | New-world pale ale | Showcasing tropical aromas from new world hops, juicy guava and stone fruit notes are balanced by a sweet malt backbone and medium bitterness. Awarded Champion Australian Beer at the 2016 Australian International Beer Awards. 6.2% ABV, 35 IBU |
| Sleeping Giant (discontinued) | English IPA | Malt-driven IPA with dank English hop aroma and notes of overripe stonefruit. 5.4% ABV, 55 IBU |
| Atomic (discontinued) | Pale ale | Piny-citrus hop character and caramel malt flavour, balanced by a refreshing bitterness. 4.7% ABV, 35 IBU |
| Break Water (discontinued) | Australian pale ale | Light-bodied with hint of citrus aroma and subtle bitterness. 4.5% ABV, 15 IBU |
| Narrow Neck (discontinued) | Session ale | Medium-bodied and full-flavoured with piny hop notes, and lingering bitterness. 3.9% ABV, 30 IBU |

Limited release small batch beers
| Beer | Style | Description |
|---|---|---|
| Shred Betty | Juciy IPA | Flavours of passionfruit, mango and grapefruit, using Citra and Simcoe and Tropicale yeast. 5.7% ABV |
| Sea Bird (discontinued) | Single Hop Pale Ale | A juicy tropical taste, a light malt base with dialled-back bitterness. 4.2% ABV |
| Spring Suit (discontinued) | Pomegranate & Guava Sour | Flavoured with pomegranate and guava and brewed in a traditional Gose style. 3.8% ABV |
| Sunset State (discontinued) | WA IPA | Fresh citrus to a rounded malt body with medium bitterness. 6% ABV |
| Cheeky Pash (discontinued) | Mango Passionfruit Sour | Flavoured with mangos and passionfruit. 4% ABV |
| After Hours (discontinued) | Hoppy Winter Ale | A hop quad of Idaho 7, Cascade, Centennial and East Kent Goldings brings a smack of citrus and pine, with a touch of resin and earth. Brewed with a strong malt bill, including Midnight Wheat, this brew pours dark tan, with medium body and firm bitterness. 6% ABV |
| Party Wave (discontinued) | Sour | Upfront stone fruit aromas combine with a hint of funk. Take a sip for waves of peach and apricot, subtle bubble on the tongue, with a tart and refreshing finish. 4.2% |
| Lager (discontinued) | European-style lager | A classic Euro-style lager crafted using 100% WA-grown malt and Hersbrucker hops. 4.7% |
| PILS (discontinued) | Czech pilsner | Clean, crisp and refined in the style of a traditional Czech pilsner. 3.5% |

== Major awards ==
| Year | Competition | Result |
|---|---|---|
| 2016 | Australian International Beer Awards | Champion Australian Beer - Little Dove; Little Dove - trophy (draught), gold (draught); Atomic - bronze (draught); Single Fin - silver (bottled), bronze (draught); Breakwater - Silver (bottled); Sleeping Giant - silver (bottled), silver (draught); Narrow Neck - bronze (bottled), silver (draught); PILS - bronze (bottled); Backyard ESB - silver (draught); |
| 2015 | Australian International Beer Awards | Runner-up Champion Large Brewery; PILS - gold (bottled), silver (draught); Atomic - bronze (packaged); Single Fin - silver (bottled), bronze (draught); Breakwater - bronze(bottled), silver (draught); Sleeping Giant - silver (bottled), bronze (draught); Narrow Neck - bronze (bottled), bronze (draught); |
| 2015 | Perth Royal Beer Show | PILS - Trophy (draught), gold (draught), silver (bottled); Atomic - bronze (draught); Single Fin - silver (draught); Breakwater - bronze (bottled), bronze (draught); Sleeping Giant - silver (draught); Narrow Neck - bronze (bottled), bronze (draught); |
| 2014 | Perth Royal Beer Show | Atomic - silver (bottled), bronze (draught); Sleeping Giant - silver (bottled), silver (draught); Narrow Neck - bronze (bottled), bronze (draught); PILS - silver (bottled); Small Batch Lager - bronze (bottled), bronze (draught) |
| 2008 | World Beer Cup | PILS - bronze; Small Batch Lager - silver; Sleeping Giant - bronze. |

== See also ==
- List of breweries in Australia
