= Thunder Road Brewing Company =

Brewery in Melbourne, Australia

- Industry: Alcoholic beverage
- Founded: 2011
- Headquarters: Brunswick, Victoria; Australia
- Products: Beer
- Production output: 1,500,000 litres
- Owner: Philip Withers
- Website: www.thunderroadbrewing.com

Thunder Road Brewing Company is an independent brewery operating in the Melbourne inner suburb of Brunswick, Australia. Since opening its doors for business in 2011, the brewery’s beers have been distributed for sale in Melbourne and distribution is now expanding throughout Australia. Thunder Road Brewing Company brews year-round flagship beers including Full Steam Pale Lager, Collingwood Draught, Hop Star, Brunswick Bitter, as well as limited release seasonal beers, for on-tap sales. In 2015, the company also introduced its first line of packaged beer, the Double Fermentation Series, and began a range of barrel aged beers known as the "President's Reserve" series.

The company is an active supporter of local sporting clubs, cultural events and local and national philanthropic organisations. It is a sponsor of the local Brunswick Women's Australian Rules Football club, the Brunswick Renegades. The company also sponsors a local fist-ball team - the Fistroy Lions.

In June 2014, Thunder Road held a major philanthropic event to raise money for the Australian Cancer Research Foundation (ACRF) and donated over $10,000 to the charity. The event attempted a "world record" by having the most people to ever brew a single batch of beer and drew over 800 "volunteer" brewers in a single day of brewing. The beer was subsequently bottled and labeled "Be Strong Ale" based on volunteers voting for the beer's name and given to volunteer brewers.

The company is also a multiyear sponsor of the Brunswick Music Festival, a multi-week musical festival that highlights established and up and coming musical acts both from Australian and from overseas, and the annual associated Sydney Road Street Party, which routinely draws tens of thousands of attendees. Both events are supported by the local Moreland Council, which encompasses the suburb of Brunswick.

In 2012 Thunder Road Brewing Company undertook legal action to unlock the trademarks to 59 heritage beer brands (including Ballarat Bitter, Richmond Lager, Kent, NQ Lager and Bulimba Gold Top) that had been acquired by CUB but were no longer in use as Thunder Road Brewing planned to release its own beers under the same names.

In September 2013 the Australian Trade Marks Office denied the request. However, the Trade Mark Office agreed with the company's central argument regarding “non-use.” In total, with 53 of the 54 trade marks at issue – grounds for “non-use” applications were established. Furthermore, ten additional CUB trade marks were ordered removed from the trademark register. The remaining marks stayed on the register through the exercise of the Registrar's discretion.

In 2015 the company was awarded the 'Champion Medium Sized Australian Brewer' for the second consecutive year, the first time an Australian brewery has won this award back-to-back, at the Australian International Beer Awards.

== See also ==
- Australian pub
- Beer in Australia
- List of breweries in Australia
- Barrel-aged beer
