= International Brewing Awards =

Biannual competitive award in brewing

The International Brewing Awards, previously known as the Brewing Industry International Awards (BIIA), is a biannual brewing competition with its origins dating to 1886. It is believed to be the oldest international brewing competition in the world.

== Organisation ==
The Awards are owned and organised by Brewing Technology Services Ltd (BTS). Only beers that pay to enter (£192 per entry as of November 2015) are judged.

The Awards are known by some as the "Brewing Oscars" and are judged only by commercially practising brewers.

== 2013 competition ==
The 2013 competition took place 13–15 February in Burton upon Trent. New for the 2013 competition was a cider category, comprising two classifications - for apple cider and cider incorporating other fruit, juices or flavours. Also new is a Special Hop Beer class within the Speciality Beer category, designed for beers with a “uniquely innovative or intense hop character”. The Awards were presented on 24 April 2013 at Guildhall, City of London.

== 2015 competition ==
In 2015 bronze, silver and gold medal winners were announced after three days of judging at the National Brewery Centre in Burton-upon-Trent, where a panel of 43 judges assessed close to 1,000 beers and ciders submitted from 50 countries. There were 39 categories, each with up to three medals, and ten additional trophies for winners of wider categories.

== 2019 Champion's Trophy Winners ==
- Small Pack Lager Competition Champion's Trophy Winner - Firestone Walker Brewing Co, Firestone Lager
- Small Pack Ale Competition Champion's Trophy Winner - Bentspoke Brewing Co, Barley Griffin
- Keg Lager Competition Champion's Trophy Winner - Fuller, Smith & Turner Plc, Frontier
- Keg Ale Competition Champion's Trophy Winner - Purity Brewing Company, Longhorn IPA
- Non & Low Alcohol Competition Champion's Trophy Winner - Big Drop Brewing Co, Citra Four Hop Pale Ale – Small Pack
- Dark Beer Competition Champion's Trophy Winner - Black Sheep Brewery, Milk Stout – Small Pack
- Strong Beer Competition Champion's Trophy Winner - St Austell Brewery, Black Square Small Pack
- Speciality Beer Competition Champion's Trophy Winner - Alken-Maes, Mort Subite Botanic Lambic Small Pack
- Cask Conditioned Ale Competition Champion's Trophy Winner - The Wimbledon Brewery Company, Wimbledon Copper Leaf

== 2017 Champion's Trophy Winners ==
- Champion Cask Ale - Encore: Lacons Brewery, Great Yarmouth, UK
- Champion Dark Beer - Kala Black IPA: Saltaire Brewery, Shipley, UK
- Champion Keg Ale - Maltings Irish Ale: Sullivan’s Brewing Company, Kilkenny, Ireland
- Champion Keg Lager - Frontier: Fuller Smith & Turner, London, UK
- Champion Smallpack Ale - Easy Jack: Firestone Walker Brewing Company, California, USA
- Champion Smallpack Lager - Pils Unfiltered Lager: Camden Town Brewery, London, UK
- Champion Speciality Beer - Coolship Fruit: Elgood’s Brewery, Wisbech, UK
- Champion Strong Beer - Rurik Russian Imperial Stout: The Galbraith Brewing Co, Auckland, New Zealand
- Non and Low Alcohol Beer - Birell: Plzenský Prazdroj a.s, Nošovice, Czech Republic
- The International Cider Awards Champion 2017 - Cidre Demi-Sec: Zeffer Cider Co., Auckland, New Zealand

== 2015 Champion's Trophy Winners ==
- Champion Smallpack Lager – Riegele Feines Urhell, Brauhaus Riegele, Augsburg, Germany.
- Champion Keg Lager – Clonmel 1650 Irish Lager, C&C Ireland, Clonmel, Ireland.
- Champion Smallpack Ale – Armory XPA, Deschutes Brewery Inc., Oregon, USA.
- Champion Keg Ale – Revisionist Rye Pale Ale, Marston’s PLC, Wolverhampton, UK.
- Champion Non and Low Alcohol Beer – Manns Brown Ale, Marston’s PLC, Burton, UK.
- Champion Dark Beer – Black Butte Porter, Deschutes Brewery Inc., Oregon, USA.
- Champion Strong Beer – Brugse Zot Dubbel, Brouwerij De Halve Maan, Bruges, Belgium.
- Champion Speciality Beer - Red Chair NWPA, Deschutes Brewery Inc., Oregon, USA.
- Champion Cask Conditioned Ale - Green Devil IPA, Oakham Ales, Peterborough, UK.
- Champion Cider – Traditional Dry Cider, Mac Ivors Cider Co., County Armagh, Northern Ireland.
