= Stone & Wood Brewing Co. =

Australian brewery

- Industry: Alcoholic beverage
- Founded: 2008; 18 years ago
- Founder: Jamie Cook, Brad Rogers and Ross Jurisich
- Headquarters: Byron Bay, New South Wales, Australia
- Products: Beer
- Owner: Lion
- Website: www.stoneandwood.com.au

Stone & Wood Brewing Co. is an Australian brewery which is based in Byron Bay, New South Wales. It was awarded 'Champion Large Australian Brewery' at the 2016 Australian International Beer Awards and its Pacific Ale won a silver medal at the World Beer Cup in the English-Style Summer Ale category.

== History ==
The Stone & Wood Brewing Co. was established in 2008 by Jamie Cook, Brad Rogers and Ross Jurisich, all of whom previously worked at Carlton & United Breweries. They constructed their first 25-hectolitre brewery in Byron Bay.

In 2012 Cook, Rogers and Jurisich bought back the 20 per cent share of its business held by Lion, following that company's takeover of Little World Beverages.

In 2014 the company opened a second 50-hectolitre brewery in Murwillumbah. The company won the 'Regional Award' at the 2014 Telstra NSW Business Awards.

In 2021 Stone & Wood parent Fermentum reached an agreement for a 100% sale to Lion handing custodianship of the Fermentum family of brands to Lion, subject to regulatory approvals. The Fermentum brands include Stone & Wood Brewing, Two Birds Brewing and Fixation Brewing Company.

== Beers ==
Year-round beers

Beer	Style	Description
Pacific Ale	Golden Ale	Cloudy and golden with a big fruity aroma and a refreshing finish. 4.4% ABV, 45 IBU
Green Coast Lager	Lager	Light amber colour with a natural yeast cloud, a balance between subtle hop aroma and full malt palate, finishing soft and clean. 4.7% ABV, 35 IBU
Garden Ale	Summer Ale	Citrus aroma balanced with a clean malt characters and an easy bitter finish. 3.8% ABV, 25 IBU
Jasper Ale	Altbier	Deep red, has a rich malt character and is well balanced with a firm spicy hop bitterness. 4.7% ABV, 15 IBU

Seasonal beers

Beer	Style	Description
The Forager	Witbier	A Belgian Style Witbier, brewed with coriander and bitter orange. 4.8%
Stone Beer	Dark Ale	A dark ale, using a selection of seven malts, provides a rich roasted cocoa aroma, caramel sweetness and dry finish. 6.4%

== See also ==
- List of breweries in Australia
