= Nail Brewing =

Australian brewery

Coordinates: 31°54′18″S 115°55′40″E

- Industry: Alcoholic beverage
- Founded: March 2000
- Headquarters: 301 Collier Road, Bassendean, Western Australia
- Products: Beer
- Owner: John Stallwood
- Website: www.nailbrewing.com.au

Nail Brewing is an Australian brewery and the producer of the world's most expensive beer, the Antarctic Nail Ale.

== History ==
In 1996 John Stallwood registered the company, Nail Brewing Australia. On 23 March 2000 Norman Moore (Minister for Racing, Gaming and Liquor) officially opened Nail Brewing's first microbrewery at Bobby Dazzler's Ale House, (a pub in Murray Street, Perth), releasing Nail Ale, an Australian style Pale Ale. On 9 April 2004 Stallwood was assaulted after intervening in a fight in Fremantle, falling into a coma for ten days, Stallwood's head injuries resulted in a titanium plate being inserted in his skull. As a result, Nail Brewing operations stopped and the equipment was sold.

In 2006 Stallwood re-commenced brewing at Jarrah Jacks brewery in Pemberton. In December 2007 Nail Brewing relocated to Edith Cowan University's Joondalup campus. In late 2010 Nail Brewing produced the most expensive bottle of beer in the world, Antarctic Nail Ale, which was made with water melted from a block of Antarctic ice. The ice was collected by the crew of the Sea Shepherd by helicopter from an iceberg in the Southern Ocean, then flown to Tasmania, melted and transported to Perth. Only thirty bottles were produced, with the first bottle auctioned for A$800 on 3 November 2011, equivalent to A$1,025.8 in 2022, with a second selling, on 19 November 2011, for A$1,850 at a fund-raising event in Sydney.

Over 90% of beer is water, so the Antarctic Nail Ale could possibly be the world's oldest and purest beer.

— John Stallwood

All proceeds from the sales of the ale went to the Sea Shepherd Conservation Society. The previous record holder was The End of The World, produced by Scottish brewers, Brewdog in July 2010.

It's great to sell the most expensive bottle of beer in the world, but it's all about a good cause. It's also good that a beer about saving the whales is now most expensive beer in the world, rather than high alcohol beer sold in animal carcasses.

— John Stallwood, 2010

In January 2012 the Feral Brewing Company and Nail Brewing formed Brewcorp Pty Ltd developing a brewhouse and warehouse facilities in Bassendean.

== Beers ==
- Nail Ale (4.7% alc/vol), an Australian pale ale, made with Tasmanian and German hops. First released in March 2000.
- Nail Golden (5.0% alc/vol), a Golden Ale.
- Nail Red (6.0% alc/vol), an American Red Ale.
- Nail Stout (5.2% alc/vol), an oatmeal stout. First released in June 2002.
- Clout Stout (10.8% alc/vol), a Russian Imperial Stout. First released in February 2008.
- Antarctic Nail Ale (4.6% alc/vol), an Australian Pale Ale. A limited-edition ale, made with water melted from a block of Antarctic ice.
- Nail Brown Dunn Brown (4.5% alc/vol), a limited release English Brown Ale
- Sledgehammer IPA (5.5% alc/vol), a limited release American Pale Ale

== Awards ==
Nail Brewing has won a number of awards including: From the Australian International Beer Awards:

- 2002 – Nail Ale – Bronze medal
- 2003 – Nail Stout – Silver medal – Small Brewery Draught Stout
- 2006 – Nail Ale – Silver medal
- 2006 – Nail Stout – Bronze medal
- 2007 – Nail Ale – Silver medal
- 2008 – Nail Ale – Bronze medal – Australian Style Pale Ale
- 2008 – Nail Stout – Silver & Bronze medals – Stout Packaged & Stout Draught
- 2009 – Nail Ale – Gold medal – Australian Style Pale Ale
- 2009 – Nail Stout – Silver & Bronze medals – Stout Draught & Stout Packaged
- 2010 – Nail Ale – Gold medal – Australian Style Pale Ale
- 2010 – Nale Stout – Silver medal – Stout Draught
- 2011 – Nale Ale – Gold medal – Australian Style Ale
- 2011 – Nale Stout- Silver medal
- 2011 – Clout Stout – Bronze medal
- 2012 – Clout Stout – Gold medal – Stout Draught

From the Sydney Royal Beer Competition:

- 2008 – Nail Stout – Gold medal & Best Stout
- 2009 – Nail Ale – Bronze medal
- 2009 – Nail Stout – Bronze medal
- 2010 – Nail Stout – Silver medal
- 2010 – Nail Ale – Bronze medal
- 2011 – Nail Stout – Gold medal
- 2012 – Nail Stout – Silver medal – Stouts & Porters
- 2012 – Nail Ale – Silver medal – Pale/Golden Ales

From the Perth Royal Beer Show:

- 2007 – Nail Ale – Silver medal
- 2008 – Nail Ale – Best WA Beer & Silver medal
- 2008 – Nail Stout – Best Stout Draught & Gold medal
- 2009 – Nail Ale – Silver medal
- 2009 – Nail Stout – Bronze medal
- 2010 – Nail Ale – Silver medal
- 2010 – Nail Stout – Gold medal
- 2010 – Clout Stout – Silver medal
- 2011 – Nail Stout – Gold medals – Best Stout Draught & Best Stout Packaged
- 2011 – Clout Stout – Silver medal
- 2012 – Nail Ale – Bronze medal – Australian style Pale Ale
- 2012 – Clout Stout – Silver medal – Stout Imperial
- 2012 – Nail Stout – Silver medal – Stout Other

== See also ==
- List of breweries in Australia
