= Balter Brewing Company =

Australian beverage manufacturer

- Industry: Alcoholic beverage
- Founded: 2016; 10 years ago
- Headquarters: 14 Traders Way, Currumbin, Queensland
- Products: Beer
- Owner: Asahi Breweries
- Website: www.balter.com.au

The Balter Brewing Company is an Australian craft brewery business based in Currumbin, Queensland.

The company was established in 2016 by multiple investors including Australian Surfing Champions Mick Fanning, Joel Parkinson, Josh Kerr and Bede Durbidge

Balter Brewing Company was sold to Carlton & United Breweries in 2019. CUB has since been sold to Asahi Breweries.

== See also ==
- Beer in Australia
- List of breweries in Australia
