= Broo Brewery =

Australian brewery

- Industry: Alcoholic beverage
- Founded: September 2009
- Headquarters: Sorrento, Victoria, Australia
- Products: Beer
- Owner: Kent Grogan
- Website: Broo Brewing Company website

Broo Brewing Company (Broo Limited) is a brewing company founded by partners Kent Grogan and Kelly Davidson in Sorrento, Victoria, Australia, in September 2009.

The company went into administration on 10 May 2022.

== History ==
The brewery was founded by Kent Grogan and his partner Kelly Davidson, with the first beer, Broo Premium Lager, produced in September 2009.

=== Owner's philosophy ===
The company was started on the basis that Broo would remain 100% Australian owned. Grogan stated at the time that the company's charter dictates that the company can never transfer shares to any company or individual that resides in a foreign jurisdiction.

=== Sales of shares ===
In 2011, a publicity program associated with the lager involved giving away shares in Grogan's brewery. Grogan estimates that over 7,000 people now hold shares in the company. In August 2012 the Australian Securities Exchange refused to list the company because it deemed its policy to restrict foreign ownership "inappropriate". In June 2013 the company launched its second beer, Australia Draught, with the company pledging to donate 20% of its profits from the sale of the beer to two charities – the SAS Resources Fund and Commando Welfare Trust.

== Beers ==
- Broo Premium Lager, a premium lager at 4.6% alcohol by volume, was launched by Grogan in September 2009 on the basis that Broo would remain 100% Australian owned. Grogan stating the company's constitution dictates that the company can never transfer shares to any company or individual that resides in a foreign jurisdiction. By 2013, Broo Premium Lager was also being sold in cans in the United States.
- Australia Draught (4.6% alcohol by volume)

== Awards ==
In 2011 Broo Ltd. received the Telstra Business Awards 'People's Choice Award' for Victorian small to medium-sized businesses. In 2012 advertising for Broo Beer, created by Melbourne agency, Nick and Phil, won the single and overall categories for round five of the 2012 Siren Awards.

== Advertising and sponsorships ==
Broo beer sponsored Scott Saunders Racing NASCAR team and Melbourne City Wrestling events.
