= Civic Video =

Video rental chain in Australia and New Zealand

CIVIC
- Industry: Home entertainment
- Founded: 1985
- Defunct: February 28, 2023; 3 years ago
- Headquarters: Alexandria, New South Wales, Australia
- Services: Home video rentals (VHS, DVD, Blu-ray, Ultra HD Blu-ray, console games)
- Parent: Civic Retailing Pty Ltd

Civic Video reward cards

CIVIC (formerly known as Civic Video) was a home video rental chain that offered titles on VHS, DVD, Blu-ray and Ultra HD Blu-ray, as well as console video games, for rent. At its peak it operated hundreds of franchise and corporate-owned video rental shops in Australia and New Zealand. In the late 2000s and 2010s the chain saw significant store closures. On 28 February 2023 the last remaining store in Windsor, New South Wales, closed after 38 years in operation.

The demise of the business and the Australian and New Zealand video rental industries as a whole is attributed largely to the introduction of online streaming services.

== History ==
=== Australia ===
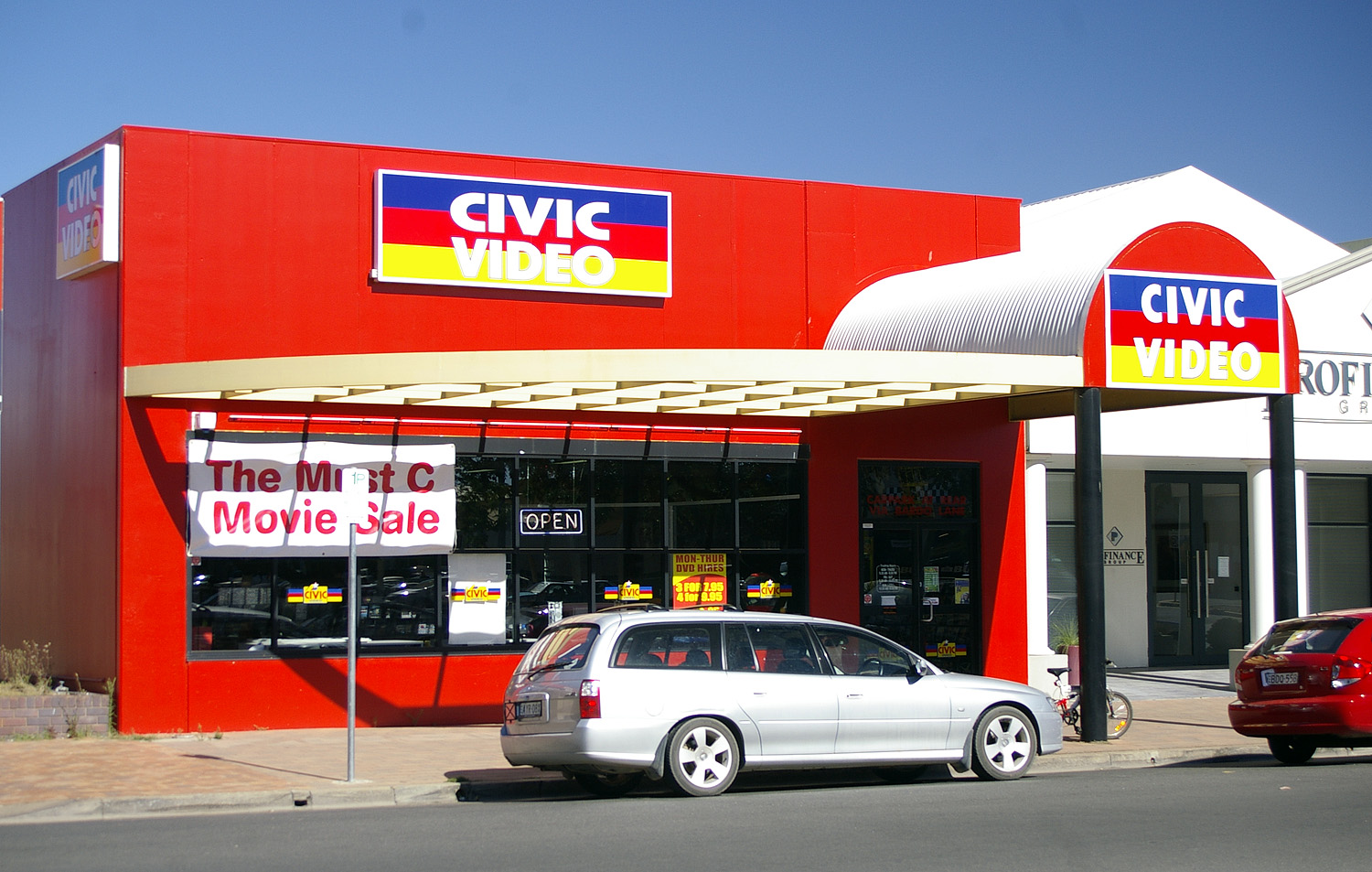
Civic Video store in Wagga Wagga, New South Wales

Civic Video store in South Hurstville, New South Wales

Civic Video was formed in Australia in 1985, initially as a buying group for several independent video stores before becoming a franchised company in 1989. Its head office was located in Alexandria, Sydney, with state operations offices in Canberra, Brisbane and Perth. Civic Video is a trade name used by Civic Retailing Proprietary Limited. The principal shareholders of Civic Video also owned VOD Proprietary Limited.

In the mid-1990s the company was Australia's second-largest video rental chain. In 1996, Civic operated over 250 stores in the country, and opened a new store every month. However, by 2018 only 12 stores remained in Australia. The company shut its head office in June that same year. By January 2019, only a half-dozen outlets still existed, with the Bunbury store in Western Australia's southwest preparing to close its doors after a 30-year stint. In November 2019, only three Civic stores remained in Australia. On 28 February 2023 the last surviving Civic store in Windsor, New South Wales, closed after 38 years in operation.

=== New Zealand ===
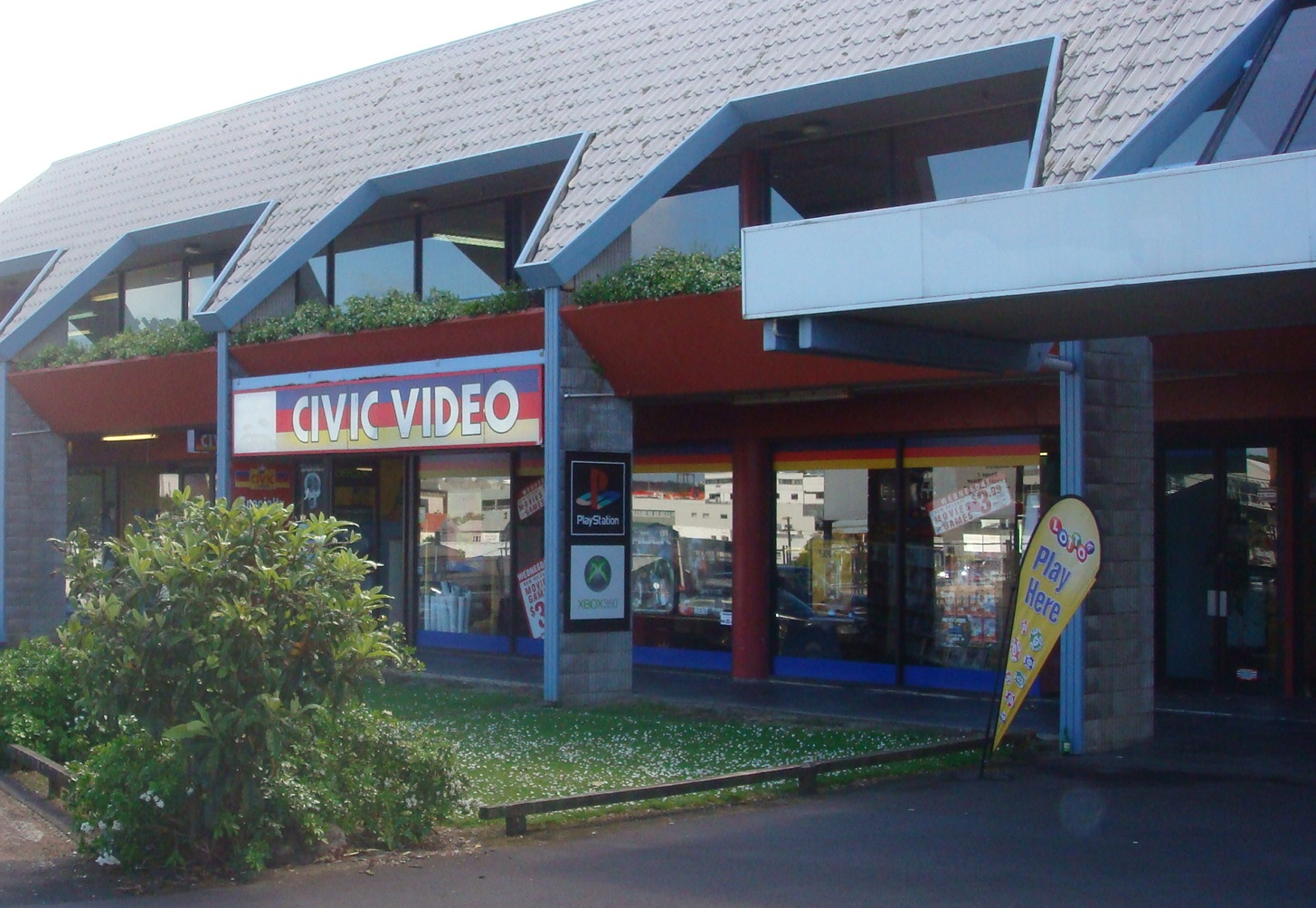
Civic Video, Ponsonby Road, New Zealand

CIVIC New Zealand was launched on 1 December 1998 with 28 stores. The New Zealand head office was located in Auckland, and at its peak boasted over 22,000 followers on Facebook.

In 2018 their website listed 20 outlets remaining in New Zealand. In January 2019, it was reported that only a half-dozen outlets still existed, with one facing imminent closure. In January 2022 the last remaining New Zealand store in Tauranga closed.

== Slogans ==
- Its A Civic Video Night Tonight (1988–1995)
- Get It Switched On, Get into Civic Video (1994–1996)
- C it at Civic (2003)
- Have a hot night in with CIVIC (2012)
