= Burleigh Brewing Company =

Australian brewery

- Industry: Alcoholic beverage
- Founded: 2006
- Headquarters: 2 Ern Harley Drive, Burleigh Heads, Queensland
- Products: Beer
- Owner: Peta and Brennan Fielding

The Burleigh Brewing Company is a brewery and taphouse located in Burleigh Heads, Queensland, Australia.

== History ==
Back from a brewing job in Hawaii, and bothered by the lack of balance, character or soul in Queensland's beer landscape, Peta and Brennan Fielding started brewing their own beer. Burleigh Brewing was born on 1 July 2006 and set about pioneering the craft beer movement on the Gold Coast.

In 2015, they outgrew the original location and moved down the road to an expanded brewery and new tap house.

== Beers ==
- Burleigh Big Head (4.2%) No-Carb Lager
- Burleigh Twisted Palm (4.2%) Tropical Pale Ale
- Burleigh 28 (4.8%) California Pale Ale
- Burleigh Fig Jam (7.0%) India Pale Ale
- Burleigh My Wife's Bitter (4.8%) English Ale
- Burleigh Black Giraffe (5.0%) Black Coffee Lager
- Burleigh Blonde (5.0%) Bier Garden Lager
- Burleigh Mid-Tide (3.0%) Ale

== Awards ==
In 2012, the HEF won the gold medal for 'South German-Style Hefeweizen/Hefeweissbier' at the Brewer's Association World Beer Cup.

In 2013, the Burleigh Brewing Company was named as the 2013 Telstra Queensland Business of the Year. In 2014 the company was named the 2014 Gold Coast Business Excellence Awards Supreme Winner.

- Burleigh Big Head - World Beer Championships 2 x Silver medals
- Burleigh Twisted Palm - World Beer Championships Gold and silver medals
- Burleigh 28 - World Beer Championships 4 x Gold and 3 x Silver medals
- Burleigh Fig Jam - World Beer Championships 5 x Gold medals
- Burleigh My Wife's Bitter - World Beer Championships 2 x Gold medals
- Burleigh Black Giraffe - World Beer Championships 4 x Gold medals

== See also ==
- Australian pub
- Beer in Australia
- List of breweries in Australia
