= Pirate Life Brewing =

Australian brewery

- Location: Adelaide, South Australia
- Opened: 2014
- Key people: Jack Cameron, Michael Cameron and Jared Proudfoot
- Parent: Asahi Beverages

Pirate Life Brewing is a brewery located in Adelaide, South Australia, that produces craft beer. Established in 2014 by Jack Cameron, Michael Cameron and Jared Proudfoot, the company officially launched in 2015 after the three founders relocated from Western Australia to open the brewery. In 2016 Pirate Life set up a distribution company for their products, Pirate Cartel, after a partial acquisition of their previous distributor. The following year Pirate Life were acquired by Anheuser-Busch InBev. After they were acquired, Pirate Life announced plans for a larger scale expansion, "quadrupling" production through a new facility in Port Adelaide.

Pirate Life Brewery is, as of 2020, owned by Asahi Beverages after its purchase of Carlton & United Beverages from Anheuser-Busch InBev.

== See also ==
- Beer in Australia
- List of breweries in Australia
- South Australian food and drink
