= Mash Brewing Company =

Australian microbrewery

- Industry: Alcoholic beverage
- Founded: April 2006
- Headquarters: 10250 West Swan Road, Henley Brook, Western Australia
- Products: Beer
- Website: www.mashbrewing.com.au

Mash Brewing Company is an Australian microbrewery in Henley Brook, located within the Swan Valley region of Western Australia.

== History ==
Mash Brewing opened in April 2006, one of a number of craft breweries operating in the Swan Valley. Owned by Brad Cox, the brewery is located behind the main bar and the open working area allows customers to view the brewing activities. Mash Brewing has a 12-hectolitre brewhouse. The foundation Head Brewer was Dan Turley.

In mid-2008, the company opened Mash Bunbury, a scaled-down version of their Swan Valley operation, including a 100-litre microbrewery that produces seasonal beers for the venue, served on tap together with the full range of Mash beers.

In November 2011, a new team, headed by brewer Charlie Hodgson, was brought in and set about reinventing the Brewery's beer range.

The current brewing team are Adrian Godwin and Ivan Juggins, brewing Mash's core range as well as seasonal and limited releases.

== Awards ==
Year	Competition	Award	Beer / Recognition	Notes
2018	Australian International Beer Awards (AIBA)	Silver	Copy Cat	
2018	Australian International Beer Awards (AIBA)	Silver	The Guvnor	
2018	Australian International Beer Awards (AIBA)	Bronze	Little NEIPA	
2017	Australian International Beer Awards (AIBA)	Gold	Three Fiddy	Draught
2017	Australian International Beer Awards (AIBA)	Silver	Guvnor	Draught
2017	Australian International Beer Awards (AIBA)	Silver	Indian Ale	Draught
2017	Australian International Beer Awards (AIBA)	Silver	Freo Doctor	Draught
2017	Australian International Beer Awards (AIBA)	Bronze	Copy Cat	Draught
2017	Australian International Beer Awards (AIBA)	Bronze	IRA	Draught
2017	Australian International Beer Awards (AIBA)	Silver	Invisible	Packaged
2017	Perth Royal Beer Show	Silver	Copy Cat	Draught
2017	Perth Royal Beer Show	Silver	Guvnor	Draught
2017	Perth Royal Beer Show	Silver	Indian Ale	Draught
2017	Perth Royal Beer Show	Bronze	Freo Doctor	Draught
2017	Perth Royal Beer Show	Bronze	Three Fiddy	Draught
2016	Australian International Beer Awards (AIBA)	Gold	Mash XPA	Draught
2016	Australian International Beer Awards (AIBA)	Gold	Copy Cat	Draught
2016	Australian International Beer Awards (AIBA)	Silver	Freo Doctor	Draught
2016	Australian International Beer Awards (AIBA)	Silver	Sarcasm	Draught
2016	Australian International Beer Awards (AIBA)	Bronze	Copy Cat	Packaged
2016	Australian International Beer Awards (AIBA)	Bronze	Grass Cutter	Draught
2016	Perth Royal Beer Show	Gold	Amber Ale	Draught
2016	Perth Royal Beer Show	Gold	Indian Pale Ale	Draught
2016	Perth Royal Beer Show	Gold	American Pale Ale	Draught
2016	Perth Royal Beer Show	Bronze	Other	Draught
2016	Perth Royal Beer Show	Bronze	Indian Pale Ale	Draught
2016	Perth Royal Beer Show	Bronze	Indian Pale Ale	Packaged
2015	Perth Royal Beer Show	Bronze	Koffee Stout	Draught
2015	Perth Royal Beer Show	Bronze	Invisible	Draught
2015	Sydney Royal Beer and Cider Show	Silver	Copy Cat	Draught
2015	Sydney Royal Beer and Cider Show	Silver	Grass Cutter	Draught
2015	Sydney Royal Beer and Cider Show	Silver	Copy Cat	Packaged
2015	Sydney Royal Beer and Cider Show	Silver	Grass Cutter	Packaged
2015	Perth Royal Beer Show	Silver	Black List	Draught
2015	Perth Royal Beer Show	Silver	Grass Cutter	Draught
2015	Perth Royal Beer Show	Gold	Premier's Trophy for Best West Australian Beer at the Show	Copy Cat
2015	Australian International Beer Awards (AIBA)	Gold	Copy Cat	Draught
2015	Perth Royal Beer Show	Gold	Copy Cat	Draught
2015	Perth Royal Beer Show	Trophy	Sail and Anchor Trophy for Best WA Brewery	Mash Brewing
2015	Australian International Beer Awards (AIBA)	Bronze	Black List Black Lager	Draught
2014	Perth Royal Beer Show	Bronze	Challenger IPA	Packaged
2014	Perth Royal Beer Show	Bronze	Russell	Packaged
2014	Australian International Beer Awards (AIBA)	Bronze	Russell	Draught
2014	Perth Royal Beer Show	Bronze	Mash Pale	Packaged
2014	Australian International Beer Awards (AIBA)	Bronze	Rye the Hop Not	Draught
2014	Australian International Beer Awards (AIBA)	Bronze	Challenger IPA	Draught
2014	Perth Royal Beer Show	Silver	Copy Cat	Packaged
2014	Sydney Royal Beer and Cider Show	Silver	Cat No. 94 Rye Porter	
2014	Sydney Royal Beer and Cider Show	Silver	Copy Cat AIPA	
2014	Australian International Beer Awards (AIBA)	Gold	Copy Cat AIPA	Draught
2014	Perth Royal Beer Show	Gold	Copy Cat	Draught
2014	Perth Royal Beer Show	Gold	Russell	Draught
2014	Perth Royal Beer Show	Gold	Mash Pale	Draught
2014	Sydney Royal Beer and Cider Show	Gold	Russell	
2014	Perth Royal Beer Show	Trophy	Beer and Beef Club of Perth Trophy for Best Ale	Draught
2014	Perth Royal Beer Show	Trophy	Sail and Anchor Trophy for Best WA Brewery	Mash Brewing
2014	Perth Royal Beer Show	Trophy	Hopco Trophy for Best Commercial Brewery	Mash Brewing
2013	Australian International Beer Awards (AIBA)	Bronze	Mash Contender Black IPA	Draught
2013	Australian International Beer Awards (AIBA)	Bronze	Koffee Stout	Draught
2013	Australian International Beer Awards (AIBA)	Bronze	Challenger IPA	Draught
2013	Australian International Beer Awards (AIBA)	Bronze	Mash Pale	Draught
2013	Perth Royal Beer Show	Silver	Amber	Draught
2013	Perth Royal Beer Show	Silver	Challenger IPA	Draught
2013	Perth Royal Beer Show	Silver	Mash Pale	Draught
2012	Australian International Beer Awards (AIBA)	Silver	Koffee Stout	Draught
2012	Perth Royal Beer Show	Bronze	Ale Draught Tank 8	Draught
2012	Perth Royal Beer Show	Gold	Koffee Stout	Draught
2012	Australian International Beer Awards (AIBA)	Gold	Deville	Draught
2012	Australian International Beer Awards (AIBA)	Bronze	Rye the Hop Not	Draught
2010	Savour Australia	Finalist	Award for Excellence – Restaurant within a BrewPub	
2010	Perth Royal Beer Show	Trophy	Hopco Trophy for Best Stout	Draught
2008	Australian International Beer Awards (AIBA)	Gold	Black Dark Lager	Draught
2008	Australian International Beer Awards (AIBA)	Silver	Honey Pils	Draught
2008	Australian International Beer Awards (AIBA)	Silver	Mex Lager	Draught
2008	Australian International Beer Awards (AIBA)	Silver	Pal	Draught
2007	Perth Royal Beer Show	Trophy	Cryer Malt Trophy for Best Ale	
2007	Perth Royal Beer Show	Gold	Pale	Draught
2007	Perth Royal Beer Show	Silver	Honey Pils	Draught
2007	Perth Royal Beer Show	Bronze	Belgian Tripel	Draught
2007	Perth Royal Beer Show	Bronze	Haze	Draught

== See also ==
- List of breweries in Australia
