= Camden Town Brewery =

British brewery

Coordinates: 51.547513°N 0.146963°W

- Company type: Brewery
- Industry: Brewing
- Founded: 2010; 16 years ago
- Founder: Jasper Cuppaidge
- Headquarters: London, NW5; England
- Products: Beer
- Owner: Anheuser-Busch InBev
- Number of employees: 200 (2020)
- Website: www.camdentownbrewery.com

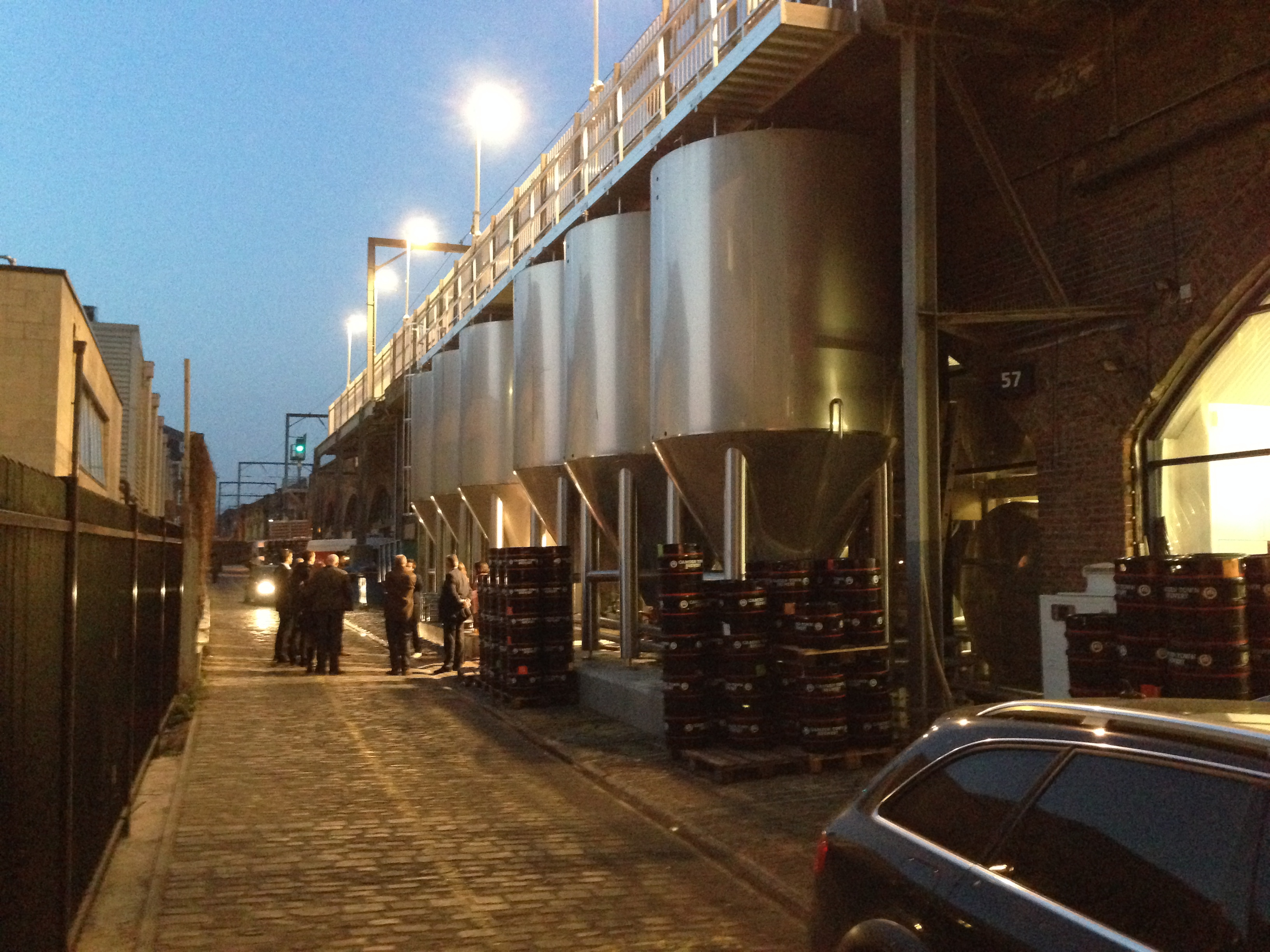
The brewery in Kentish Town

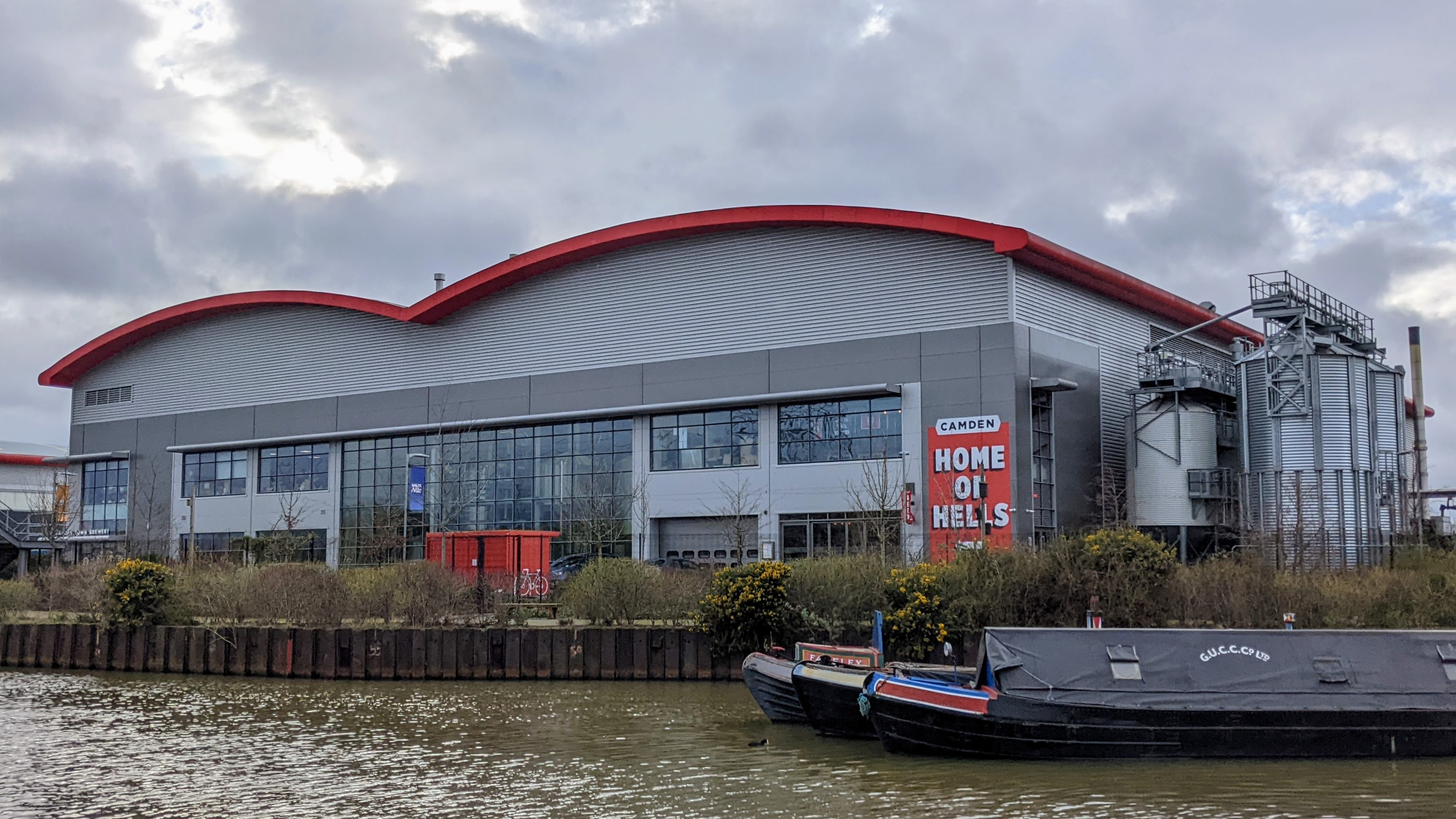
The brewery in Enfield

Camden Town Brewery is a Camden, London-based brewery founded in 2010, and owned by Anheuser-Busch InBev since 2015.

== History ==
The brewery was founded by Jasper Cuppaidge (born 1975), the grandson of Laurie McLaughlin, who ran McLaughlin’s Brewery in Rockhampton, Australia from 1910-1960, along with an estate of 60 pubs.

During the mid-1990s, Cuppaidge missed his flight back home to Australia and consequently remained in England, collecting glasses in a London pub. Ten years later, he purchased a dilapidated Hampstead pub and reopened it in 2006 as The Horseshoe, serving food, wine, and beer.

Cuppaidge brewed his first batch of beer, named Mac's Beer in honour of his grandfather, at The Horseshoe in 2007 as a birthday present for his mother, Patricia. Based on one of McLaughlin's old recipes, the beer proved successful with the pub's customers, and Cuppaidge began to sell it to his pub-owner friends.

In 2009, he began to pursue a full-time business in brewing lager, but discovered that the name Mac's was already in use by another brewing company. Inspired by the borough in which he lived, he typed www.camdentownbrewery.com into a search engine, noticed the domain name was available, and bought it on the spot.

Shortly after, Cuppaidge rented five Victorian railway arches underneath Kentish Town West Station. By Spring 2010, Camden Town Brewery officially started brewing. Hells Lager, a cross between Helles and Pilsner brewed with malt and hops sourced from Germany, debuted in Autumn 2010, and is now brewed and sold alongside a collection of core beers and occasional releases.

=== AB InBev ===
In December 2015, it was announced that Camden Town Brewery was being bought by the world's largest brewer, Anheuser-Busch InBev, for about £85 million. The Guardian noted that "Cuppaidge, his family and three best friends own 95% of the company’s equity, suggesting that they have shared a combined payout of more than £80m." James Watt, the founder of the BrewDog craft beer company, said that they would cease selling Camden Town products in its bars, "because it does not sell drinks made by AB InBev".

Camden Town Brewery built a new brewery in Enfield by the banks of the River Lee, 12 miles north of their Kentish Town brewery. Completed in Spring 2017, the new brewery will allow production to move to Enfield while the current branch at Wilkin Street Mews is renovated into a pilot brewery.

== Beers ==
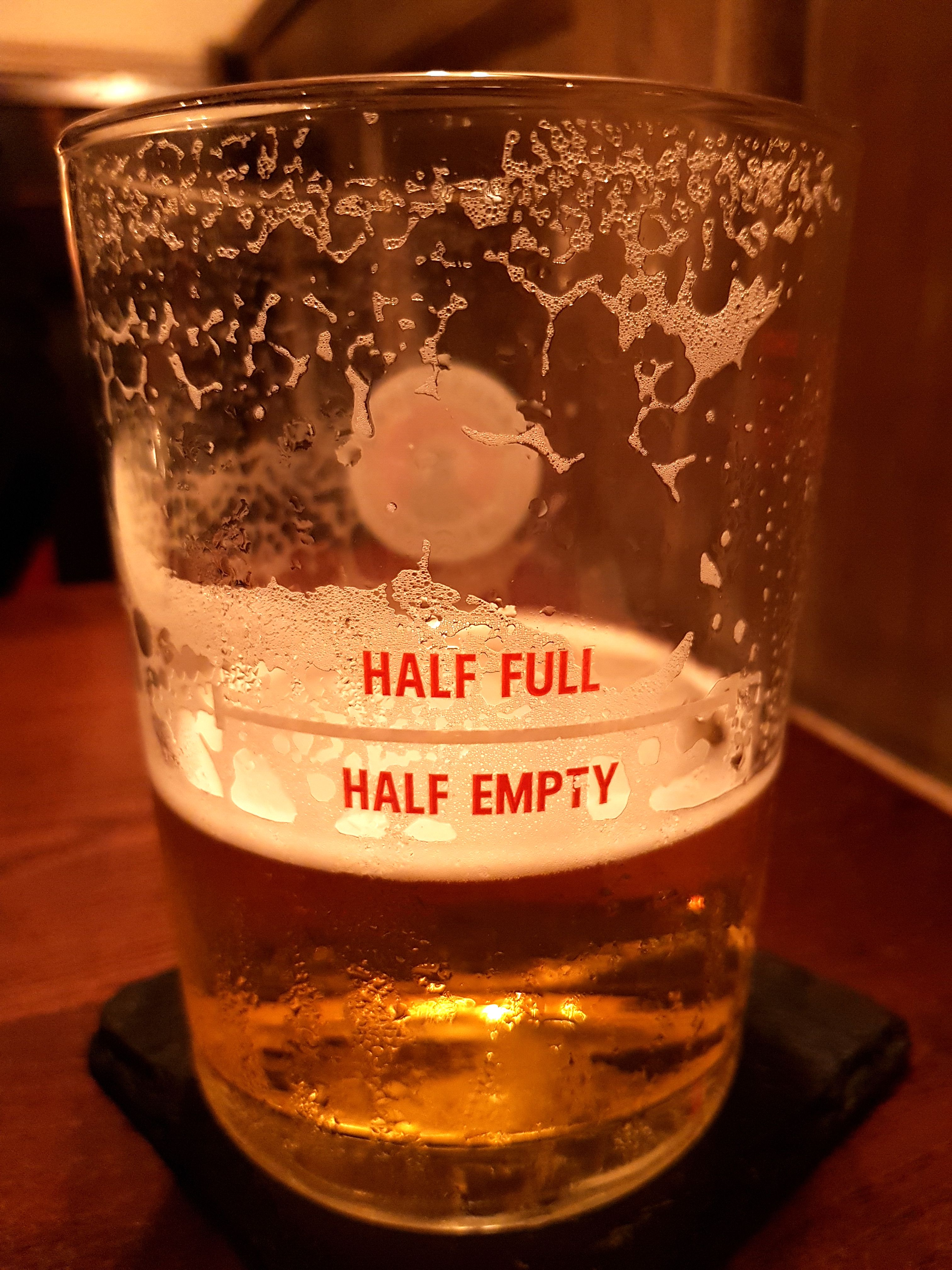
A Camden Town Brewery branded beer glass.

Camden Town Brewery's all-year-round 'present' range includes:

- Hells Lager (4.6% ALC, 24 IBU) – their signature lager, combining the two German beer styles Helles and Pilsner.
- Pale Ale (4.0% ALC, 38 IBU) – a British take on the U.S. pale ale style, using American hops.
- Gentleman's Wit (4.3% ALC, 15 IBU) – a traditional Belgian wit (white beer) with added bergamot and lemon zest.
- Pils Lager (4.6% ALC, 36 IBU) – a hoppy, piney pilsner lager.
- Unfiltered Hells (4.6% ALC, 20 IBU) – Hells Lager with yeast left in for fuller body and smoother taste.
- IHL Lager (6.2% ALC, 55 IBU) – a take on India Pale Ale as lager, with double dry hops.
- Ink Stout (4.4% ALC, 51 IBU) – a dark, bitter stout, carbonated using nitrogen bubbles.

The brewery also rotates a range of 'occasional' beers, brewed in limited batches throughout the year:

- Flue Faker Lager (Jan-Feb) – a take on the classic Bamberg Rauchbier.
- Inner City Green Lager (Apr-May) – a refreshing beer with a herbal aroma.
- Strawberry Hells Forever Lager (Jul-Aug) – the classic Hells Lager recipe with added hand-picked strawberries.
- Oktoberfest Lager (Oct-Nov) – fruit and nut flavour with a deep amber colour, brewed at a higher gravity.

Previous Camden Town Brewery beers have included:

- No Substitutions (8% ALC, 60 IBU)
- Jarrylo Hells (4.8% ALC, 41 IBU)
- Hops Don’t Grow On Trees (5.8% ALC, 37 IBU)
- Beer 2015 (7.6% ALC, 45 IBU)
- Camden Versus Stone + Wood Lager (4.9% ALC)
- Barrel Aged IHL (7.4% ALC, 54 IBU)
- Fruit Cup (5.4% ALC, 17 IBU)
- Black Friday (5.4% ALC, 40 IBU)
- One Hells Of A Beaver (5.2% ALC, 55 IBU)
- Beer 2014 (9.50% ALC, 28 IBU)
- Pumpkin Spiced Lager (5.2% ALC, 16 IBU)
- Camden Versus Mohawk Black IPL (5.8% ALC, 65 IBU)
- Camden x Kernel x Partizan (4.8% ALC, 22 IBU)
- Emperor Nero (5.8% ALC, 58 IBU)
- God Save The Elk (4.8% ALC, 41 IBU)
- Camden Versus Petrus (6% ALC, 45 IBU)
- Beer 2013 (8.8% ALC, 28 IBU)
- Indian Summer Lager (6.2% ALC, 52 IBU)
- Alsace Alt (4.6% ALC, 38 IBU)
- Camden Versus Odell (7% ALC, 28 IBU)
- Camden Versus Italy (5.8% ALC, 45 IBU)
- Pete Versus The World (8.18% ALC, 50 IBU)
- Camden 1908 (5% ALC, 36 IBU)
- Camden Rude Boy (6.8% ALC, 68 IBU)
- Camden USA Hells Lager (4.6% ALC, 26 IBU)

== Bars ==
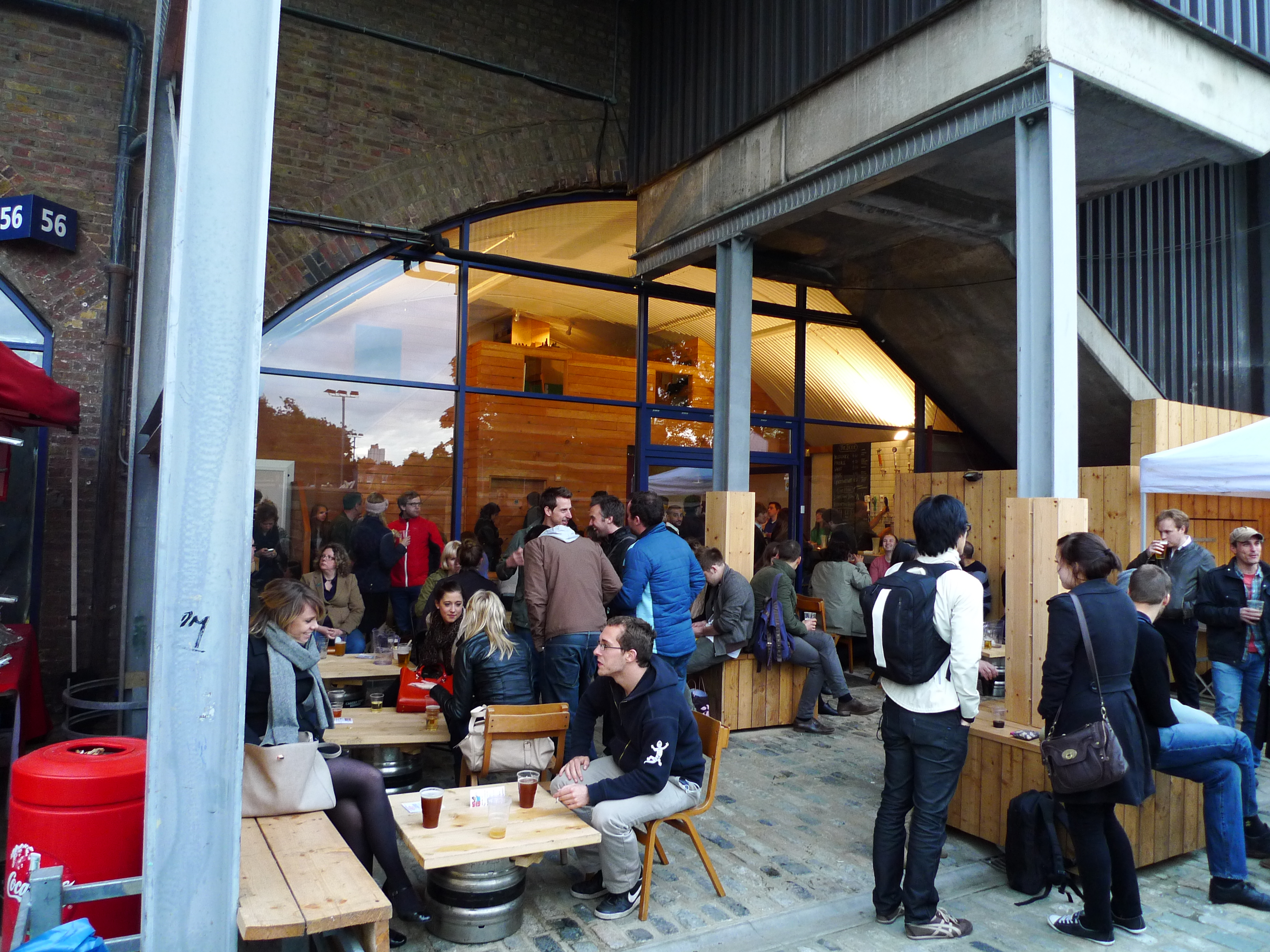
Camden Town Brewery Bar, Kentish Town, London, 2012

The Horseshoe remains in operation, serving Camden Town Brewery beers alongside fine wines, guest beers, and a seasonal menu using fresh ingredients.

The Brewery Bar, located within the arches of the Kentish Town brewery, serves their beers on tap with a rotating guest list of street food vendors including Motherflipper, Oli Baba's and Dosa Deli. The Brewery also offers tours to the public to see how their beer is made and sample brew straight from the tank.

Camden's Daughter, a beer and snack bar located on the Kentish Town High Street, opened in Autumn 2015, serving Camden beers plus a pop-up kitchen currently occupied by Burger and Beyond, serving an all-day menu of burgers and bar snacks.

== Awards ==
Hells Lager has won numerous awards including Champion Keg Lager at the 2013 International Brewing Awards and bronze at the 2013 European Beer Star.

Gentleman's Wit won a silver medal in the Wit category at the 2016 World Beer Cup.

The 2015 International Brewing Awards saw IHL Lager win a gold medal in the Can category, while Hells Lager and Pale Ale both received a silver medal in Keg Lager and Keg Ale categories respectively.

== See also ==
- Barrel-aged beer
