= Bootleg Brewery =

Microbrewery in Wilyabrup, Western Australia

Coordinates: 33°45′25″S 115°03′19″E

- Industry: Alcoholic beverage
- Founded: 1994
- Headquarters: Wilyabrup, Western Australia
- Products: Beer
- Owner: Tom Reynolds

The Bootleg Brewery is a microbrewery in Wilyabrup, Western Australia, near Margaret River, and is set on 30 hectares (74 acres) of land beside a lake. It was started by Tom Reynolds as a retirement project in 1992, and opened in 1994, when just two other pub brewers existed in Western Australia.

Bootleg produces a range of beers sold both domestically and internationally. In 2006, annual production was 125,000 litres (33,000 US gal). Being situated in the Margaret River region more known for wine production, Bootleg Brewery claims to be "an oasis of beer in a desert of wine".

The Bootleg Brewery has won a variety of medals from the Australian International Beer Awards:

- Sou' West Wheat: Bronze (1997, 2001–2004), Silver (2005, 2006)
- Tom's Brown Ale: Silver (2001, 2002, 2004, 2005)
- Settlers Pale Ale: Bronze (2003), Silver (2006)
- Raging Bull: Gold (1999, 2003, 2004), Silver (1997, 1998, 2002, 2005)
- Amber Light: Bronze (2002–2004)
- Wils Pils: Gold (2002, 2003), Silver (2002, 2004), Bronze (1997, 2001)

== See also ==
- Australian pub
- Beer in Australia
- List of breweries in Australia

== Bibliography ==
- Deutsher, Keith M. (2012). The Breweries of Australia (2nd ed.). Glebe, NSW: Beer & Brewer Media. ISBN 978-0-98739-521-4.
