= Young Henrys =

Australian craft beer brewery

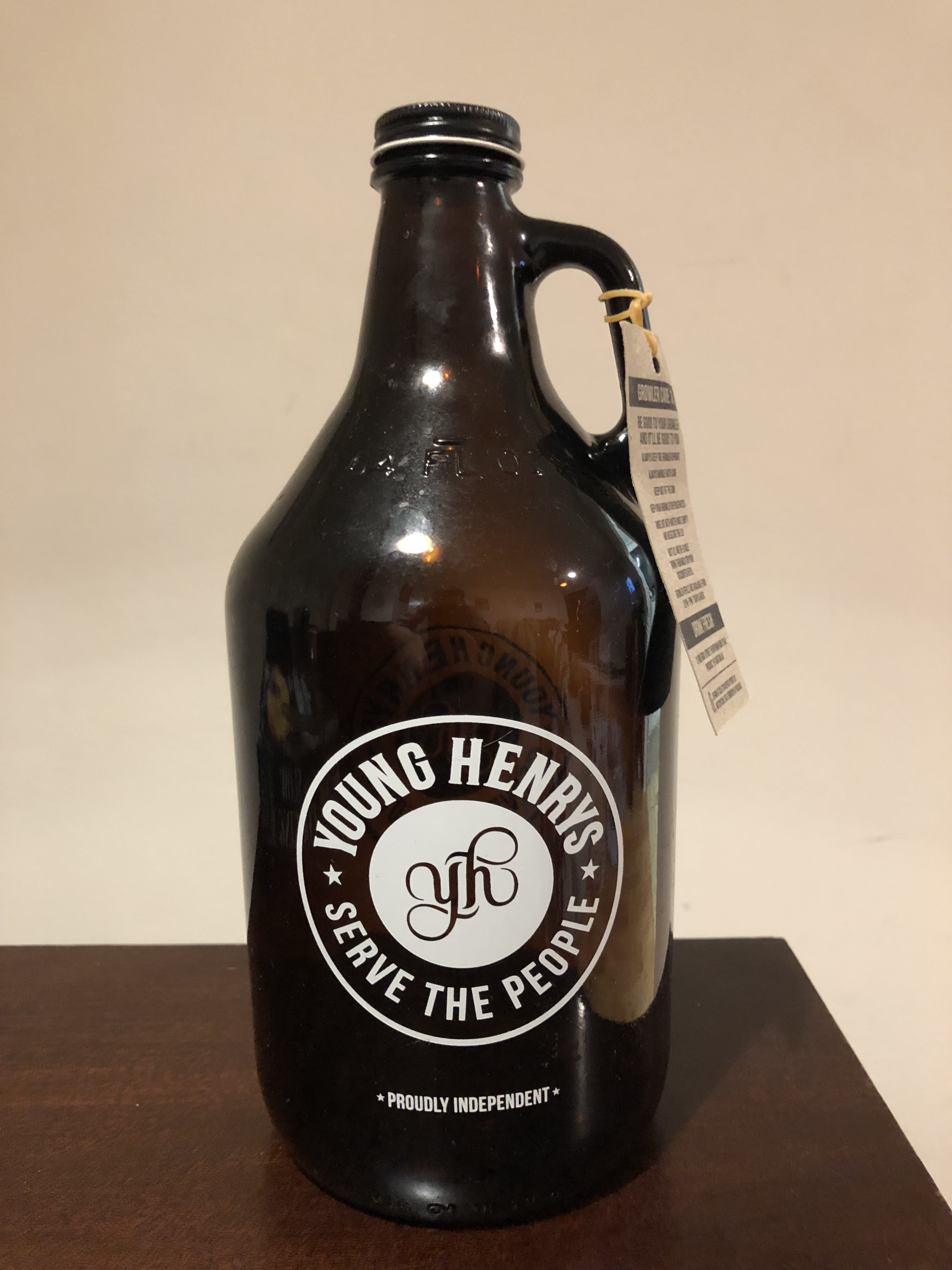
- Industry: Brewing
- Founded: 2012
- Founder: Richard Adamson, Oscar McMahon
- Headquarters: Newtown, Sydney, Australia
- Products: Beer, Cider, Gin
- Website: younghenrys.com

Young Henrys is an Australian craft beer brewery located in Newtown, New South Wales. The brewery engages in environmentally sustainable brewing practices; they crowd-funded solar panels through a collaborative project with Pingala in 2016, and partnered with the UTS Deep Green Biotech Hub and Climate Change Cluster research institute in 2018 to install microalgae bioreactors to turn the brewery's CO_{2} wastage into oxygen.

Young Henrys was awarded Vintage Cellars Brewery Of the Year in 2019, their Newtowner Pale Ale received 4th place in the GABS Hottest 100 Craft Beer Awards 2017-2019, and their Stayer received a Gold Award in the Australian International Beer Awards in the 2019 Reduced/Low Alcohol Category. Young Henrys has produced collaboration beers with Australian and International musicians including You Am I, Foo Fighters and Dune Rats, and was the official beer partner of the South Sydney Rabbitohs in 2018 and 2019.

== History ==
Young Henrys was founded in 2012 by Oscar McMahon & Richard Adamson.

Richard Adamson began as the head brewer for Sydney based Barons Brewing (now Great Southern Brewing) in 2005. After winning awards including Best in Class Trophy for their Herb and Spice Beer in the Australian International Beer Awards in 2006, and JD Wetherspoon Beer Festival UK's "Most Popular Beer" for their Black Wattle in 2008, the brewing company went into voluntary administration in June 2010. Adamson left Barons Brewing in 2010.

In 2011, McMahon and Adamson began running a monthly meeting named Beer Club at the Roxbury Hotel in Glebe. The Beer Club sessions hosted representatives from Australian and International breweries, who would showcase two beers each. The club would attract crowds of 35-60 people to each event. It was at the Beer Club events that McMahon and Adamson formed the concept of opening a brewery. The name "Young Henrys" was born during the idea development stage of the brewery. Sales director Dan Hampton quotes "Rich was daddy day care at the time looking after his son, and before one ideas meeting Oscar asked, 'Is Young Henrys coming along to the meeting?' And they wrote that down as a working title." McMahon says the name is "appropriate" as the traditional name parallels their style of recreating traditional beer styles.

In 2012, McMahon and Adamson attempted to open Young Henrys brewing Co in an empty warehouse on Devonshire Street in Surry Hills, Sydney. The warehouse at 276 Devonshire Street had previously been tenanted as a furniture shop, offices and a gym. The development application received 57 objections from a total 74 public submissions. The application was rejected by the council. Young Henrys moved the development of their brewery and brewpub to Newtown, Sydney. The brewing company proposed a development application for a warehouse at 76 Wilford Street, Newtown. The industrial complex site had been rejected for use as a yoga studio and cafe in January 2012. Adamson's application for a 90 person capacity brewpub was approved in 2012. Adamson and McMahon invested an initial $800,000 into the original set up during 2012. At the time they had eight small fermentation tanks, which was upgraded to twenty tanks in 2017.

Young Henrys expanded operations in 2014, opening a second brewery in Metricup, Western Australia. Named The Beer Farm, the 20-hectolitre brewery was built in an old dairy, and produced Young Henrys flagship beers for the Western Australian market. In July 2015, Young Henrys announced an ownership restructure for The Beer Farm, with the farm becoming a separate entity producing its own brand of beer.

== Sustainability ==
=== Solar panels ===
Young Henrys collaborated with the Pingala Co-operative to install a 33 kW solar panel array on the roof of the brewery in August 2016. The community group Pingala was the recipient of a $44,000 grant under the City of Sydney's Environmental Performance - Innovation Grant Program, which was used in part to fund a third of the solar project. Young Henrys opened a crowd funding program to finance the rest of the project, which attracted 300 applications. Young Henrys raised $17,500 within nine minutes for the solar project, with 54 successful applicants contributing to the investment.

Young Henrys holds a ten year lease on the solar panels, and pay for the solar electricity generated during this period. This revenue is used to repay the community investors. After the ten year post installation period, the ownership of the panels transfers to Young Henrys who will continue to use solar energy to partly power the brewery, reducing their greenhouse gas emissions by 127 tonnes per year.

The crowd-funded solar project was the first of its kind to run in an Australian capital city. The project attracted political interest, with Sydney Lord Mayor Clover Moore attending the investor event.

=== Algae project ===
Young Henrys partnered with UTS Biotech Hub and Climate Change Cluster in 2018 to install two 400-litre bioreactors into its Newtown brewery. The bioreactors contain up to 5 million cells of microalgae, that are used to absorb the CO_{2} waste product produced in the fermentation process (produced at 35g of CO_{2} per 1 Litre of beer) and release oxygen back into the atmosphere. Algae is up to five times more efficient than trees at absorbing carbon, and just one of the algae bags at Young Henrys can produce the same amount of oxygen as one hectare of bushland.

=== Earth Hour Drought Draught ===
The World Wide Fund for Nature subsidiary Earth Hour ran a campaign in 2015 called #savetheales, to raise awareness about the effects of global warming. As a part of the campaign, The University of Queensland conducted research that revealed that Australian hops would decline in both quality and quantity. Earth Hour enlisted Young Henrys and Willie the Boatman to develop a beer named Drought Draught, using dried-out malt and stale hops to draw attention to how climate change would effect beer. This campaign ran up to the UN Paris Climate Conference in November 2015.

== Media ==
=== Tattoo campaign ===
Young Henrys received backlash from the media regarding their flash tattoo promotional campaign, which asked the public to "immortalise [their] love of beer" by having one of five artwork options tattooed on their body. News.com.au called the campaign "cringeworthy" and "humiliating", calling out the $200 prize money as "measly".

=== My Kitchen Rules ===
In March 2019, Young Henrys featured on Australian television series My Kitchen Rules. Contestants on the series competed in a challenge named "Quick Bites: Beer Challenge" that took place on site at the Young Henrys brewery. The challenge utilised Young Henrys' flagship beers in a cooking competition, that was judged by celebrity chefs Pete Evans and Colin Fassnidge.

== Community ==
=== Musician partnerships ===
Young Henrys collaborated with Australian rock band You Am I to release a limited-release beer, Brew Am I. This beer was launched in 2013 to coincide with the band's 20th Anniversary Tour. The beer used ingredients from the band members home towns, including wheat from WA for Tim Rogers and Russell Hopkinson, malt from Victoria for David Lane, and New Zealand hops for Andy Kent. Brew Am I is a New World style pale ale, and had 10,000 bottles pre-ordered before the commencement of the tour

In 2018, Young Henrys partnered with American touring rock band Foo Fighters to produce a limited edition beer named FooTown Lager in conjunction with their Concrete and Gold album and tour. Queensland rock band DZ Deathrays, who also produced a beer with Young Henrys in 2016, joined Foo Fighters as the supporting act on the Concrete and Gold tour. DZ Deathrays and Young Henrys produced a Czech pilsner named Pils N Thrills for Blurst Of Times Festival in Brisbane

Australian garage rock band Dune Rats released limited edition Dunies Lager in collaboration with Young Henrys, in celebration of their album The Kids Will Know It's Bullshit topping the ARIA Charts.

=== Inner West Brewers Association ===
In 2017, Young Henrys were one of five breweries that founded the Inner West Brewers Association, along with Wayward Brewing Company, Batch Brewing Company, Willie the Boatman and Grifter Brewing Company. The organisation, which has the support of Anthony Albanese, was created to support the development of craft breweries in the area, and the reduction of development restrictions. The organisation brought local, state and federal attention to craft brewing in Sydney's Inner West, prompting former Leichhardt Council and current member of the Elected Mayors Council of the Inner West Darcy Byrne to appoint a council representative to assist development application specifically in the craft brewing sector.

== Beers ==
=== Core range ===
Young Henrys Beers
Beers	ABV	First Released	Description
Newtowner Pale Ale	4.8%	Dec 2012	Launched on 12 December 2012 in celebration of 150 years of Newtown. The Australian pale ale pays homage to Australia's heritage, combining Australian and English ingredients. This beer was originally intended as a limited release, but was made permanent and has become the breweries largest flagship beer by volume. The original logo for the Newtowner limited release was designed by honey Rogue Design, and features native flora and fauna and the Newtown postcode, 2042
Natural Lager	4.2%	2012	An unfiltered Australian lager using Australian noble hops. The Natural Lager was launched in 2012 as one of the first beers brewed. Young Henrys Natural Lager won a Gold award in the Australian International Beer Awards- European Lager Division, 2019
IPA	6.0%	Sep 2019	This IPA is an adaptation of a past release IPA from Young Henrys. It is a combination of Australian and American style IPAs, with notes of citrus, pine and tropical fruit
Stayer Mid Strength	3.5%	Aug 2018	Originally released as a keg-only limited release, and later introduced as a permanent beer. Young Henrys Stayer is a hoppy, lower ABV style. Young Henrys Stayer Mid received a Gold award in the Australian International Beer Awards - Reduced/Low Alcohol category, 2019.
Cloudy Cider	4.6%	2012	Young Henrys Cloudy Cider is brewed using 100% Australian Pink Lady and Royal Gala Apples

=== Limited release, seasonal release and past beers ===
- Real Ale
- Motorcycle Oil Hoppy Porter
- Hop Ale
- Summer Hop Ale
- Doubletowner
- Brut IPA
- Young Henrys & Afends Hemp IPA
- Winter Hop Ale

== Awards ==
=== GABS Hottest 100 ===
==== 2017 ====
- 4th: Newtowner (Australian Pale Ale)
- 57th: Summer Hop Ale (American IPA)
- 61st: Natural Lager (Pale Kellerbier)

==== 2018 ====
- 4th: Newtowner (Australian Pale Ale)
- 31st: Natural Lager (Kellerbier)
- 89th: Summer Hop Ale (Australian IPA)
- 94th: Motorcycle Oil (Porter)
- 95th: Afends Hemp IPA (Specialty Beer)

==== 2019 ====
- 4th: Newtowner (Australian Pale Ale)
- 56th: Natural Lager (Kellerbier)
- 62nd: Motorcycle Oil (Porter)
- 71st: IPA (Australian IPA)
- 89th: Stayer Mid (Hoppy Lager)

=== Australian International Beer Awards ===
==== 2019 ====
- Stayer, Draught - Gold - Reduced/Low Alcohol
- Natural Lager, Draught - Gold - European Style Lager
- Natural Lager, Packaged - Gold - European Style Lager

==== 2021 ====
- Natural Lager, Draught - Gold - European Style Lager
