= Yeastie Boys =

Brewing company in New Zealand

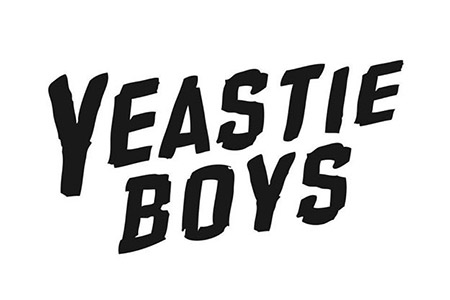
- Location: Wellington, New Zealand
- Opened: 2008

Yeastie Boys is an independent brewing company based in Wellington, New Zealand. Stu McKinlay and Sam Possenniskie established it in 2008. Yeastie Boys have a roster of three regular beers which they produce year round, and also produce a limited release of seasonal beers which they release each spring, summer, autumn and winter.

Yeastie Boys themselves do not practice beer and food matching, instead choosing to match their beers with music, films, places or people.

Stu McKinlay in Sevenoaks, England develops Yeastie Boys beers. The beers are commercially produced in New Zealand, Australia and United Kingdom.

== Year-round beers ==
- Pot Kettle Black - 6.0% porter a multiple award-winning beer
- Hud-a-wa' Strong - 6.8% rich, strong, hoppy amber ale
- Rex Attitude- 7.0% peat-smoked strong golden ale
- Gunnamatta - 6.5% Earl grey tea infused IPA
- Digital - 5.7% Tropical balanced IPA

== Seasonal beers ==
- His Majesty - The inaugural release, in 2009, was an assertively bitter, 6.5% India Pale Ale.
- Her Majesty: Inaugural release at Beervana 2010.
- PKB Remix: a playful annual remix of Pot Kettle Black to celebrate its double trophy-winning effort at BrewNZ 2009. In 2009 the hoppy porter became a 6.66% hoppy stout, while 2010 saw the NZ hops replaced by US Cascade and the ABV was upped to 6.8%.
- Digital IPA: An India pale ale released late 2011. This free beer has the exact recipe made widely available ('open source') to enable home brewers to brew their own versions.

== Seasonal draught/tap beers ==
- Pot Kettle Black (porter): a popular assertively hopped porter, which has been called a 'Black IPA' due to its notably strong New Zealand hop character. Released in September 2008 (5.2%) and June 2009 (6.0%).
- Golden Boy, a 4.7% golden ale: a single malt summer ale using Maris Otter malt and liberally hopped with New Zealand Styrian Golding and Nelson Sauvin. Released December 2008.
- Kid Chocolate - 3.6% mild ale: a reddish session ale, in the Yeastie Boys self-proclaimed favourite style, with a mild balance of malt and hop. One of the lowest alcohol commercial beers released in New Zealand. Released March 2009.
- Plan K - 4.6% Belgian pale ale: a Belgian-styled pale ale released at Beervana, Wellington, in August 2009.
- PKB Remix 2009 - 6.66% (stout): a remix of Pot Kettle Black to celebrate its double trophy-winning effort at BrewNZ 2009. The hoppy porter becomes a hoppy stout.
- The Nerdherders - 4.8% New Zealand pale ale: A modern pacific-styled pale ale (aromatic and highly bittered) with intercontinental and transatlantic influences. Two batches of this beer were produced - 'B' and 'D' (referring to the respective use of Motueka and Riwaka hops - formerly known as 'Saaz B' and 'Saaz D'). Released in December 2009.
- Return to Magenta - 5.0% hoppy Belgian amber ale: An amber ale with aromatic new world hops, biscuity malt and a spicy Belgian yeast. Released in April 2010.
- The Monsters - 6.0% New Zealand IPA and American IPA: Two India pale ales for winter with 100% UK malt and a load of hops. Two near identical batches of this beer were produced - 'Yakima Monster' and 'Motueka Monster' (referring to the respective hop growing regions of the hops used in each beer: USA and NZ respectively). Released in June 2010.
- Punkadiddle - 3.7% ordinary bitter: a red-hued ordinary bitter with 100% English malt, East Kent Goldings and a London ESB yeast.
- Rapture and Europa - 4.2% blonde ale: a pair of mildly hopped blond session ales brewed for summer 2009/2010 utilising the same recipe but using different yeasts (a Belgian Abbey yeast for Rapture and a German Kölsch yeast for Europa).

== Awards ==
Pot Kettle Black:

- Best in Class (Porters and Stouts) and Gold Medal - 2009 BrewNZ Beer Awards
- People's Choice - Beervana 2009
- Silver Medal (Porters) - 2010 Australian International Beer Awards
- Silver Medal (Ales) - 2011 Australian International Beer Awards
- Silver Medal (Porters and Stouts) - 2011 BrewNZ Beer Awards
- Bronze Medal (Porters and Stouts) - 2012 Brewers Guild of NZ Awards
- Gold Medal (Porters) - 2012 Asia Beer Awards
- Champion Beer - 2012 Asia Beer Awards
- Best Black IPA - 2014 Hong Kong International Beer Awards
- Champion Beer - 2014 Hong Kong International Beer Awards

Rex Attitude:

- Morton Coutts Trophy for Innovation - 2011 BrewNZ Beer Awards

PKB Remix 2010:

- Bronze Medal (Ales) - 2011 Australian International Beer Awards

His Majesty 2010:

- Silver Medal (Ales) - 2011 Australian International Beer Awards

His Majesty 2009:

- Bronze Medal - 2009 BrewNZ Beer Awards

Yakima Monster 2010:

- Silver Medal - 2010 BrewNZ Beer Awards

Her Majesty 2010:

- Bronze Medal - 2010 BrewNZ Beer Awards
