= Australian International Beer Awards =

Annual brewing competition

- Industry: Alcoholic beverage
- Founded: 1992; 34 years ago
- Headquarters: Melbourne, Australia
- Products: Beer
- Owner: Royal Agricultural Society of Victoria
- Website: www.rasv.com.au/Events/AIBA_Home

Australian International Beer Awards (AIBA) is an annual brewing competition that commenced in 1992.

The AIBA is undertaken by the Royal Agricultural Society of Victoria (RASV). Judging of the awards is conducted at Melbourne Showgrounds, with the Awards presentation dinner held during Good Beer Week in Melbourne, Australia.

The awards were originally the 'National Beer and Brewing Awards' and operated in a partnership between RASV and the University of Ballarat. In 1995 the awards became an international competition, with a field of 201 competitors and entries from New Zealand, Papua New Guinea, Canada, Indonesia, Malta and Tonga. It was at these awards that the first international winner was announced, Cisk Export Premium Lager by Simonds Farsons Cisk of Malta winning the Grand Champion Beer award.

The AIBA are now the second largest competition of their kind in the world, with 1,480 entries by 270 brewers from 35 countries in 2013.

Competitors must pay to enter in order to be judged. Only the trophies awarded in over 75 classes are strictly competitive; the unlimited number of gold, silver and bronze awards are based on meeting points thresholds in blind tastings.

== Trophy winners ==
=== 2006 ===
- Grand Champion – Redoak Brewery (New South Wales)
- Champion Small Brewery – Colonial Brewing Company (Western Australia)
- Champion International Brewery – Schneider Weisse, Private Weissbierbrauerei (Germany)
- Champion Australasian Brewery – Little Creatures Brewery (Western Australia)

=== 2007 ===
- Grand Champion – Weihenstephan Brewery (Germany)
- Champion International Small Brewery – Colonial Brewing Company (Western Australia)
- Champion International Large Brewery – Deschutes Brewery (Oregon, USA)
- Champion Australasian Brewery – Colonial Brewing Company (Western Australia)

=== 2008 ===
- Grand Champion – Matilda Bay Brewing Company (Western Australia)
- Champion Large Brewery – Matilda Bay Brewing Company (Western Australia)
- Champion Small Brewery – Redoak Brewery

=== 2009 ===
- Grand Champion – Feral Brewing Company (Western Australia)
- Champion Large Brewery – Cerveceria Hondurena SA de CV (Honduras)
- Champion Small Brewery – Feral Brewing Company (Western Australia)

=== 2010 ===
- Grand Champion – Nøgne Ø – Det Kompromissløse Bryggeri (Norway)
- Champion Large Brewery – Weihenstephan Brewery (Germany)
- Champion Small Brewery – Nøgne Ø – Det Kompromissløse Bryggeri (Norway)

=== 2011 ===
- Grand Champion – Moylan’s Brewing Company (California, USA)
- Champion Large Brewery – Brooklyn Brewery (New York, USA)
- Champion Small Brewery – Moylan's Brewing Company

=== 2012 ===
- Champion Large Australian Brewery – Feral Brewing Company (Western Australia)
- Champion Large International Brewery – Deschutes Brewery (Oregon, USA)
- Champion Small Australian Brewery – Wig and Pen Brewery and Tavern (Australian Capital Territory)
- Champion Small International Brewery – Pelican Pub and Brewery (Oregon, USA)

=== 2013 ===
- Championship Large International Brewery- Weihenstephan Brewery (Germany)
- Championship Medium International Brewery- Nogne O Brewery (Norway)
- Championship Small International Brewery- Renaissance Brewery (New Zealand)
- Champion Australian Beer – Alpha Pale Ale by Matilda Bay Brewing Company (Victoria)
- Champion International Beer – Oude Geuze by Oud Beersel (Belgium)
- Champion Large Australian Brewery – Carlton and United Breweries (Victoria)
- Champion Medium Australian Brewery – Feral Brewing Company (Western Australia)
- Champion Small Australian Brewery – 2 Brothers Brewery (Victoria)

=== 2014 ===
- Championship Large International Brewery – Oriental Brewery Company (Gyeonggido, South Korea)
- Championship Medium International Brewery – Heller-Bräu Trum Kg (Bavaria, Germany)
- Championship Small International Brewery – Renaissance Brewery (Marlborough, New Zealand)
- Champion Australian Beer – Mash IPA by Mash Brewing Company (Western Australia)
- Champion International Beer – Obisdian Stout by – Deschutes Brewery (Oregon, USA)
- Champion Large Australian Brewery – Carlton and United Breweries (Victoria)
- Champion Medium Australian Brewery – Thunder Road Brewing Company (Victoria)
- Champion Small Australian Brewery – 3 Ravens (Victoria)

=== 2015 ===
- Championship Large International Brewery – Brouwerij De Halve Maan, Belgium
- Championship Medium International Brewery – Pelican Pub and Brewery (Oregon, USA)
- Championship Small International Brewery – Parrotdog (Wellington, New Zealand)
- Champion Australian Beer – Barley Wine – Barrel Beer by Mountain Goat Beer (Victoria)
- Champion International Beer – Speight's 5 Malt Old Dark by – Lion Beer Spirits Wine (Dunedin, New Zealand)
- Champion Large Australian Brewery – 4 Pines Brewing Company (Victoria)
- Champion Medium Australian Brewery – Thunder Road Brewing Company (Victoria)
- Champion Small Australian Brewery – Boatrocker Brewing Company (Victoria)

=== 2016 ===
- Champion Large International Brewery – Ballast Point Brewing and Spirits (California, USA)
- Champion Medium International Brewery – Pelican Brewing Company (Oregon, USA)
- Champion Small International Brewery – Moylan's Brewing Company (California, USA)
- Champion Australian Beer – Little Dove (Draught) – Gage Roads Brewing Company (Western Australia)
- Champion International Beer – Samuel Adams Kosmic Mother Funk Grand Cru (Packaged) – Boston Beer Company (Massachusetts, USA)
- Champion Large Australian Brewery – Stone & Wood Brewing Co. (New South Wales)
- Champion Medium Australian Brewery – Two Birds Brewing (Victoria)
- Champion Small Australian Brewery – Pirate Life Brewing (South Australia)
- Champion Gypsy Brewer – BrewCult (Victoria)

=== 2017 ===
- Champion Large International Brewery – DAGON Beverages Co. (Myanmar)
- Champion Medium International Brewery – Pelican Brewing Company (Oregon, USA)
- Champion Small International Brewery – Deep Creek Brewing Company (Auckland, New Zealand)
- Champion Australian Beer – White Rabbit White Ale White Rabbit Brewery (Victoria)
- Champion International Beer – Feral One – Firestone Walker Brewing Company (California, USA)
- Champion Large Australian Brewery – Stone & Wood Brewing Co. (New South Wales)
- Champion Medium Australian Brewery – Balter Brewing Company (Queensland)
- Champion Small Australian Brewery – Green Beacon Brewing Co. (Queensland)
- Champion Gypsy Brewer – Pact Beer Co (ACT)

=== 2018 ===
- Champion Large International Brewery – Firestone Walker Brewing Company (USA)
- Champion Medium International Brewery – Mahrs Bräu (Germany)
- Champion Small International Brewery – Kererū Brewing Company (New Zealand)
- Champion Australian Beer – Beerland Wheat Beer – Beerland Brewing (WA)
- Champion International Beer – Knotty – Three Weavers Brewing (USA)
- Champion Large Australian Brewery – Mountain Goat Beer (Victoria)
- Champion Medium Australian Brewery – Green Beacon Brewing Co. (Queensland)
- Champion Small Australian Brewery – Black Hops Brewing (Queensland)
- Champion Gypsy Brewer – Philter Brewing (NSW)
- Consistency of Excellence Trophy – Fixation Brewing Company (Victoria)

=== 2019 ===
- Champion Australian Beer – Keller Door – Schwarzbier – 4 Pines Brewing Company (NSW)
- Champion Large Australian Brewery – Balter Brewing Company (QLD)
- Champion Medium Australian Brewery – Green Beacon Brewing Co. (QLD)
- Champion Small Australian Brewery – Blackman’s Brewery (VIC)
- Champion International Beer – Feral One – Firestone Walker Brewing Company (USA)
- Champion Large International Brewery – DB Breweries (NZ)
- Champion Medium International Brewery – Deep Creek Brewing Company (NZ)
- Champion Small International Brewery – McLeod’s Brewery (NZ)
- Best New Exhibitor – Breakside Brewery (USA)
- Best Australian-Style Lager – Steinlager Pure – Lion (NZ)
- Best European-style Lager (excluding Pilsner) – Buckskin Munich Helles – King Car Group (Taiwan)
- Best International Lager – Undercurrent – Deep Creek (NZ)
- Best Pilsner – The Prospector Pilsner – Hemingway’s Brewery (QLD)
- Best Amber / Dark Lager – Keller Door: Schwarzbier – 4 Pines Brewing Company (NSW)
- Best Australian Style Pale Ale – Nowhere Pale Ale – DB Breweries (NZ)
- Best New World-Style Pale Ale – Pale Ale – Cheeky Monkey (WA)
- Best International-Style Pale Ale – Balter Strong Pale Ale – Balter Brewing Company (QLD)
- Best British-Style Ale (Excluding IPA & Pale Ale) – Summer Ale – Mountain Goat Beer (VIC)
- Best European-Style Ale – Infinite Guide Gose – Bravo Brewing Co. (China)
- Best IPA – Hawkers West Coast IPA – Hawkers Brewery (VIC)
- Australia Best Amber / Dark Ale – Traders – McLeods Brewery (NZ)
- Best Porter – Black Shield Draught – Myanmar Brewery LTD (Myanmar)
- Best Stout – Exit Milk Stout – Exit Brewing (VIC)
- Best Reduced / Low Alcohol Beer – Mid Range – Black Hops Brewing (QLD)
- Best Wheat Beer – TAP6 Mein Aventinus – Schneider Weisse (Germany)
- Best Belgian / French Ale – Feral One – Firestone Walker Brewing Company (USA)
- Best Scotch Ale / Barley Wine – Alba – Cervejaria Bohemia (Brazil)
- Best Fruit Beer – Rodenbach Charactere Rouge – Brouwerij Rodenbach (Belgium)
- Best Wood or Barrel Aged Beer – Captain of the Coast – Pelican Brewing Company (USA)
- Best Specialty Beer – Maui Express – Denver Beer Co. (USA)

=== 2020 ===
Normal judging for 2020 was cancelled due to the COVID-19 pandemic. New award categories were created and people from within the beer world invited to vote

- Brewer’s Choice Best Champion Australian Brewery since 2012 – 4 Pines Brewing Company
- Brewer’s Choice Best Champion Australian Beer since 2012
  - Alpha Pale Ale – Matilda Bay Brewing Company
  - Keller Door Schwarzbier – 4 Pines Brewing Company
- Brewer’s Choice Best AIBA Collab Beer since 2012 – We do it for the Passion...fruit Passionfruit IPA – Stone & Wood Brewing Co., Balter Brewing Company, Green Beacon Brewing Co., Pact
- Brewer’s Choice Best Champion IPA since 2012 – Pulped Fiction – Mountain Goat Beer
- Brewer’s Choice Best Champion Lager since 2012 – Pilsner – Moo Brew
- Brewer’s Choice Best Champion Pale Ale since 2012 – XPA – Balter Brewing Company
- Brewer’s Choice Best Champion Dark Beer since 2012 – Keller Door – Schwarzbier – 4 Pines Brewing Company
- Brewer’s Choice Best Champion Euro Style Beer since 2012 – Summer Ale – Mountain Goat Beer
- Brewer’s Choice Best Champion Other Specialty Beer since 2012 – Throwback IPA – Pirate Life Brewing
- Brewer’s Choice Best Champion Design since 2012 – Bastard Children of the British Empire – 4 Pines Brewing Company
- Best Australian Beer Name ever – Furphy – Lion
- Best Australian brewery social media – Balter Brewing Company's Instagram
- Thinking about COVID-19, which Australian brewery has made the best of a bad situation? – 4 Pines Brewing Company's home delivery service
- Best Beer Industry Personality? – Tina Panoutsos – Carlton and United Breweries

=== 2021 ===
- Champion Australian Beer – Gold Teeth 2021 – Dollar Bill Brewing (VIC)
- Champion International Beer – Sauvage – Deep Creek Brewing Company (New Zealand)
- Champion Large Australian Brewery – 4 Pines Brewing Company (NSW)
- Champion Medium Australian Brewery – Hop Nation (VIC)
- Champion Small Australian Brewery – Cheeky Monkey Brewery (WA)
- Champion Victorian Brewery – Hop Nation (VIC)
- Australian Gypsy Brewer Award – Valhalla Brewing (VIC)
- Champion Large International Brewery – Deep Creek Brewing Company (New Zealand)
- Champion Medium International Brewery – Nbeer Craft Brewing Co. (China)
- Champion Small International Brewery – Goose Island Brewhouse Seoul (South Korea)
- Gary Sheppard Memorial Trophy for the Best New Exhibitor – Hoppin' Frog Brewing Company (USA)
- Best Australian Style Lager – Lager – Two Birds Brewing (VIC)
- Best European Style Lager (excluding Pilsner) – Lager – Mismatch Brewing (SA)
- Best International Lager – Coastie Lager – Six String Brewing Company (NSW)
- Best Pilsner – Rattenhund – Hop Nation (VIC)
- Best Amber / Dark Lager – Keller Door-Schwarzbier – 4 Pines Brewing Company (NSW)
- Best Australian Style Pale Ale – Burleigh Twisted Palm – Burleigh Brewing Company (QLD)
- Best New World-Style Pale Ale – Cryotherapy Hazy IPA – Sunday Road Brewing (NSW)
- Best International-Style Pale Ale – King Road IPA – King Road Brewing Co (WA)
- Best British or European-Style Ale (excluding IPA & Pale Ale) – Foghorn Hunter Kolsch – Foghorn Brewery (NSW)
- Best Traditional IPA – Sprocket – Bentspoke Brewing Co (ACT)
- Best Modern IPA – Lefties – Cheeky Monkey Brewery (WA)
- Best Amber / Dark Ale – The Buzz – Hop Nation (VIC)
- Best Porter (including Baltic Style Porter) – Valhalla Brewing Obsidian – Valhalla Brewing (VIC)
- Best Reduced / Low Alcohol Beer – James Boag’s Premium Light – J Boag & Son Brewing (TAS)
- Best Non-Alcohol Beer – Tinnies Ultra Low Alcohol – Coles Supermarkets (VIC)
- Best Wheat Beer – Lowen White Beer – China Resources Snow Breweries Co. (China)
- Best Belgian / French Style Ale – Le Petit Biere – Stone & Wood Brewing Co. (NSW)
- Best Fruit Beer – Gold Teeth 2021 – Dollar Bill Brewing (VIC)
- Best Wood- And Barrel-Aged Beer – Sauvage – Deep Creek Brewing Company (NZ)
- Best Specialty Beer – Heavy Smoker – Zhang Men Brewing Company (Taiwan)
- Best Specialty Flavoured Beer – Dangge Vanilla Coffee Imperial Stout – Dangge Brewing (China)
- Consistency of Excellence Medal – Awarded to products that have been awarded a gold medal for three consecutive years:
  - Captain of the Coast – Pelican Brewing Company, Oregon (USA)
  - Obsession Session IPA – Fixation Brewing Company, (VIC)

== See also ==
- Beer in Australia
- List of breweries in Australia
- Australian Distilled Spirits Awards
