= CBCo Brewing =

Microbrewery in Western Australia

- Industry: Alcoholic beverage
- Founded: 2004
- Headquarters: Osmington Road, Margaret River, Western Australia
- Products: Beer
- Owner: CLG
- Website: cbco.beer

CBCo Brewing (formerly Colonial Brewing Co) is a microbrewery in Bramley Brook Valley, approximately 8 km (5.0 mi) north-east of Margaret River, Western Australia, and is set on 30 ha (74 acres). CBCo Brewing produces a range of beers including several award-winning varieties which are sold on the domestic and international markets.

== History ==
The brewery was established in 2004 by Ross Smith, with head brewer, Steve Plowman, and was one of only three breweries established in the Margaret River area. In late 2006, the brewery was purchased by a group of investment bankers, the Empire Beer Group for $15M (AUS), who subsequently arranged a $30M (AUS) public float, to bankroll plans to open another outlet (with a larger brewing and packaging facility) in Fremantle. In July 2007, the Empire Beer Group purchased the Royal Bar and Brasserie in East Perth for $3.5M (AUS), a departure from the plans outlined in the company's prospectus (which was to develop a second pub in Fremantle). In August 2008 the Empire Beer Group agreed to sell 'The Royal on the Waterfront' and the CBCo Brewing to the CLG for $4.5M (AUS), a company owned by Chris Morris (the founder of Computershare).

In 2008, CBCo Brewing appointed Mal Secourable as the head brewer (formerly the head brewer at Matso’s in Broome and a brewer at Fremantle’s Sail and Anchor Hotel), replacing Dean McLeod (who previously worked at the Lord Nelson Brewery Hotel and Malt Shovel Brewery). In 2009, the CBCo Draught won 'Best Ale Draught', Best Commercial Beer' and the Premier's Trophy for 'Best Western Australian Beer' at the Cryer Malt Perth Royal Show. In March 2013 Secourable left CBCo Brewing and was replaced by Justin Fox (Swan Brewery and The Generous Squire Brewpub).

== Beers ==
=== Regular ===
- CBCo Middy(3.5% alc/vol), a 100 calorie lager
- CBCo South West Sour Tropical (4.6% alc/vol), a dry hopped kettle sour
- CBCo South West Sour Watermelon and Raspberry (4.0% alc/vol), a fruit infused kettle sour
- CBCo Draught (4.8% alc/vol), a German-style Kölsch
- CBCo Pale Ale (4.4% alc/vol), a German-style Altbier
- CBCo India Pale Ale (6.5% alc/vol), Indian Pale Ale
- CBCo Porter (5.6% alc/vol), Porter

=== Special/Limited ===
- Colonial Mumme (5.5% alc/vol), a German-style Braunschweiger Mumme, made predominantly with barley ale.
- Colonial Keutebier (5.6% alc/vol), a Hamburg adaptation of the Mumme style beer, using barley, wheat, molasses and oats.
- Baltic Porter (7.5% alc/vol)
- Colonial Kotbusser (5.7% alc/vol), a German-style Kottbusser, a beer style once outlawed in Germany as it did not adhere to the laws of the Reinheitsgebot by its inclusion of raw oats, molasses and honey.
- Colonial Brewing Dampfbier (5.5% alc/vol), a German 'Steam Ale' or Hefeweizen using barley instead of wheat

== Awards ==
In 2006, the CBCo Brewing was awarded 'Champion Small Brewery' at the Australian International Beer Awards, the following year it was awarded 'Champion Australian Brewery' and 'Champion International Small Brewery'.

In 2012, the Australian Hotels Association (Western Australia) awarded the CBCo Brewing joint winner of the 'Best Boutique Brewery', together with the Cheeky Monkey Brewery.

== See also ==
- List of breweries in Australia
