= Mountain Goat Beer =

Australian brewery based in Richmond, Victoria

Coordinates: 37°49′0″S 145°0′45″E

- Industry: Alcoholic beverage
- Founded: 1997
- Headquarters: 80 North Street; Richmond, Victoria; Australia
- Products: Beer
- Owner: Asahi Beverages
- Website: www.goatbeer.com.au

Mountain Goat Beer is a brewery in Richmond, Victoria, Australia. The brewery was founded in 1997 by Cam Hines and Dave Bonighton. The company's first commercial brew, 'Hightale Ale' amber ale, was released in October 1997. Mountain Goat Beer was purchased by Asahi in September 2015.

The Mountain Goat brewery operates out of a converted red brick warehouse in the inner-city suburb of Richmond. The site is home to the brewing operation as well as sales, administrative and management staff. The brewery has been described as a tourism attraction and has been included in the Victorian Government's Beer Lover’s Guide to Victoria’s Microbreweries publication and in television travel shows.

== History ==
The origins of Mountain Goat Beer date to the early 1990s, when co-founder Bonighton was homebrewing in his backyard in Elsternwick, Victoria, Australia. His friend and co-founder Hines was travelling in North America after quitting his music industry job and he was struck by the range of micro-brewed beer available at the bars in Vancouver, British Columbia, Canada.

The pair then decided to start a brewing company and attempted to secure a bank loan with collateral that included Bonighton's EH Holden, three surfboards and a couple of mountain bikes. After they were unable to borrow a sufficient amount of funding from a bank, friends and family assisted Bonighton and Hines to launch Mountain Goat. Bonighton explained in a September 2012 interview:

We're a small brewery run by two former homebrewers who, for 15 years, have been making the kinds of beers that we like to drink. Most breweries brew to a formula, something born in a focus group or in a marketing team meeting. We come up with our ideas at the bar.

Bonighton and Hines decided on the name 'Mountain Goat' as a reference to the task ahead of them and bringing new styles of beer to the Australian market compared to their competitors at the time, as a mountain goat is 'a big hairy animal that's never going to fall over'.

By September 1996, Mountain Goat beer was ready to taste-test three beers—The Leroy Brown Ale, Sheik-It-Out Stout and Golden Boy—at a gallery space in Melbourne. This venture indicated to Hines and Bonighton that their original idea might be viable.

Lacking the money to invest in their own brewery, the first Mountain Goat beers were brewed using excess capacity first at the Scottish Chiefs brew-pub in Geelong and then at the larger Grand Ridge microbrewery in Mirboo North, Victoria and in October 1997, Hightale Ale was commercially released.

=== Mountain Goat brewery ===
By 1999, the brewery was able to raise funds to move to their original premises in Crown St, Richmond, effectively relocating the equipment from the defunct brewing operations at the Geebung Polo Club in Hawthorn, Victoria.

At the end of 2004, Mountain Goat beer moved to the much larger current premises, in North St, Richmond. The North St site is around 1200m^{2} which is a little over three times the size of the older brewery. In October, 2011, the brewery upgraded its brewing operation with the purchase of a brand new 25 hectolitre system from Canadian manufacturer, DME.

=== International markets ===
In 2011, the brewery began exporting to the United States (US) with an initial offering of the Hightail Ale and a re-work of their IPA (renamed as "Australian Pale Ale" for the US market). Bonighton explained in September 2012 that due to the inspiration that he and Hines gained from US breweries prior to starting Mountain Goat, an expansion into the country's market seemed appropriate.

== Environmental considerations ==
Mountain Goat brewery has taken many steps to reduce - and in some cases eliminate - their impact on the environment. Moving to new premises in 2004 gave the company the opportunity to set up the brewery with the environment in mind, from using recycled materials in their fit-out through to installation of solar panels. The brewery also pH neutralises waste water and have all but eliminated steam and odour emissions that are a by-product of the brewing process.

Before any waste from the brewery floor goes to the sewer it is pH and temperature neutralised in a holding tank, using a three vessel trade waste system. The first tank screens the larger solids, such as hop and malt debris or bits of plastic or wood. The second tank catches the smaller solids, such as yeast slurry, floor grit or finer hop and malt particles. The third tank is where the trade waste adjusted for temperature and pH. This ensures that the biosolids, temperature and chemical load on the sewer system is drastically reduced. The brewery also pays an outside contractor to perform higher level servicing and to monitor the system for other pollutants. They also provide the EPA with certification when the settling tank is emptied twice a year.

== Beers ==
All Mountain Goat beers are vegan friendly. No animal products are used in their production and their beers are fined using a centrifuge and are free from preservatives.

=== Regularly brewed beers ===
- Hightail Ale, the first beer released commercially by Mountain Goat (in October 1997). Hightail is an English-style ale available in bottle conditioned and draught forms. The beer won the Trophy for Best Draught Ale at the 2000 Australian International Beer Awards (as well as a gold medal) and has been awarded silver medals in 2011, 2010, 2008, 2007, 2003, 2002 and 2000; Bronze medals in 2012, 2010, 2009, 2008, 2006, 2005, 2003, 2002 and 2001. Alcohol content: 4.5%
- Steam Ale, a California Commons-style steam ale, was first released 3 July 2009. This beer is certified organic. Steam Ale won a bronze medal at the 2012 Australian International Beer Awards, two silver medals in 2011 and a bronze medal in 2010. Alcohol content: 4.5%
- Pale Ale, an American inspired Pale Ale. This beer was originally only available occasionally on tap at the Goat Bar but became a permanent core range in September 2015. Alcohol content: 5.2%
- Summer Ale, another beer that was originally a seasonal brewery exclusive. This refreshing, fruity beer become a permanent option in September 2013 and was Mountain Goat's first release in a can. Alcohol content: 4.7%
- Fancy Pants, Mountain Goat's second beer available in a can. Described as an evolution of the Hightail Ale, this beer has a higher malt bill laden with hops and dry-hopped with Galaxy. Alcohol content: 5.2%
- Goat, described as an uncomplicated Australian lager beer that contains Galaxy and Ella hops. Goat beer has a 4.2% alcohol content.

=== One-off and seasonal beers ===
- Surefoot Stout, was the third beer commercially released by the brewery. Surefoot is a seasonal beers, brewed through autumn and winter. Sold in 330ml bottles until 2009, it was first sold in 650ml bottles in June 2010. Surefoot Stout has twice been named winner of the Best Victorian Beer at the Australian International Beer Awards (2004 and 2006). The beer was also Best in Class (gold medal) at the 2002 Awards, won a gold medals in 2010 and 2009, a silver medal in 2003 and bronze medals in 2007, 2008 and 2009. Alcohol content: 5.0% (depending on the batch) and uses Australian Pilsner malt, two different British crystal malts, black malt and flaked barley. East Kent Goldings hops are also used. This beer was a limited release in cans for winter 2015.
- Double Hightail Ale, first released in late September 2011 and based on the brewery's flagship Hightail Ale, with a higher alcohol content. The Double Hightail Ale has an alcohol content by volume of between 6.8 and 7.2% (depending on batch). The Double Hightail uses Australian traditional ale malt, British crystal malt and black malt. Tasmanian Galaxy Hops are added late in fermentation.
- Thorny Goat Black IPA, a black India Pale Ale brewed in collaboration with Thornbridge Brewery in the UK (released in March 2011) in 640ml longneck bottles. The Thorny Goat used several malts: Ale, Munich, Crystal, Chocolate and Midnight Wheat. The hops used were all sourced from Australia or New Zealand and included Tasmanian Galaxy and New Zealand Motueka hops (Bronze medal at the 2011 Australian International Beer Awards). Alcohol content: 6.8%
- Seedy Goat Coffee IPA, was an IPA brewed with the addition of coffee beans, made in collaboration with Melbourne coffee roasters, Seven Seeds. First released in 640ml longneck bottles in August, 2011 and reprised in August 2012. The brew uses Nicaraguan coffee bean and Tasmanian and American hops.
- Rye IPA, first released in February 2012, a Rye India Pale Ale which as the name suggests uses a significant amount of rye (Gold medal at the 2012 Australian International Beer Awards).
- Gypsy and the Goat, released in April 2012, a 'Cross Breed' with Danish brewer Mikkeller. It's a black pepperberry IPA brewed with Galaxy, Citra and Cascade hops.
- Before the Dawn Black IPA, released in September 2012, a black India Pale Ale brewed with five malts and both Cascade and Galaxy hops.
- Triple Hightail Ale, released as part of the brewery's 15th birthday celebrations in October 2012. Alcohol content: 8.3%
- Rapunzel 2012, a strong Belgian Blonde released in bottles in December 2012. Alcohol content: 8.3%
- Fancy Pants 2013, a hoppy amber ale, brewed with Galaxy and Cascade hops. Alcohol content: 5.2%
- Hopfweizenbock, the brewery announced the release of this product on 25 June 2013. Brewed in collaboration with the Brooklyn Brewery, the collaborative beer is a Weizenbock (strong German-style wheat beer), dry hopped with Australian Galaxy hops. The alcohol volume of the Hopfweizenbock is 6.5 per cent.

The brewery rotates a series of "one-off" brews, generally only available on-site at the brewery's own bar, but occasionally available on tap at selected outlets. Examples of these limited run brews have been:

- India Pale Ale (New) An American style IPA
- Old Surefoot (an aged Surefoot Stout)
- Bigfoot (a higher alcohol version of the regular Surefoot Stout)
- Double India Pale Ale - winner of a bronze medal at the 2009 Australian International Beer Awards
- Rapunzel (a Belgian-style strong blonde) - winner of the 2009 Premier's Trophy (and a gold medal) for Best Victorian Beer at the Australian International Beer Awards
- Dunken (a dunkelweizen - or dark wheat beer) - winner of a silver medal at the 2010 Australian International Beer Awards
- Fancy Pants (a highly hopped amber ale) - winner of a bronze medal at the 2009 Australian International Beer Awards
- Goldilocks (a late-hopped English style summer ale)
- The Hoeff (a hefeweizen - German style wheat beer)
- Double Hightail Ale (a variation of the standard Hightail Ale, stronger in alcohol)
- Kölsch (a style of lager characteristic of Köln (Cologne), Germany)
- Riwaka Pale (a pale ale using New Zealand Riwaka [D Saaz] hops and Vienna and Munich malts)
- Oaked Rapunzel (a Belgian-style strong blonde, matured for nine months in an oak chardonnay barrel)
- Imperial Pilsner (brewed with Pilsner and Light Munich malts and Czech Saaz hops - 7.5% alc/vol)
- Bubble & Squeak (a hybrid ale brewed with eight malts and four different hops)
- Skipping Girl (a Summer Ale brewed with 30% wheat malt and using Nelson Sauvin and Motueka hops) - winner of a silver medal at the 2012 Australian International Beer Awards
- Rye India Pale Ale (an India Pale Ale brewed with rye malt)
- The Craig (an American Pale Ale using Willamette hops)
- Cucumber Sandwich (a summer ale infused with cucumber and made with various NZ hops)
- Winter Oaky Porter (a porter using six different malts and fermented with French Oak chips)
- Helles to the Yeah (A strong Helles - or light [coloured] German lager)
- Saison de la Chevre (A saison - loosely translated as Saison of the Goat)
- The Craig II (a Nitrogen-Powered English Red Ale brewed with Willamette and Cascade hops) - winner of a silver medal at the 2012 Australian International Beer Awards
- Kristalweizen (a filtered German-style wheat beer)
- Top Paddock (a spiced Red Saison, brewed for the 2012 Great Australasian Beer Spectapular event, held in Melbourne in May 2012)
- Hip Hip Hooray IPA (an India Pale Ale brewed with Cascade, Galaxy, Nelson Sauvin and Amarillo hops - 7.4% alc/vol)
- The Naz (an English Style Porter infused with cocoa nibs, vanilla beans and whole coffee beans - 5.2% alc/vol)
- Little Sister (a Belgian golden ale, the lisste sister of their regular Rapunzel brew - 4.3% alc/vol)
- The Craig 2013 (a nitrogen-powered ESB [or Extra Special Bitter] - 5.8% alc/vol)
- FX Stout (a Foreign Extra stout - 6.7% alc/vol)
- India Red Ale (An all New Zealand malt bill with four US hops [Ahtanum, Citra, Cascade and Amarillo] - 6.6% alc/vol)

Beers made in collaboration with other breweries and venues, on tap only for a limited time:

- Richard III (a doppelbock, or strong, malty bock, brewed in collaboration with the Wig & Pen Brewery in Canberra).
- Abbey Collaby 2011 (a Belgian Dubbel with waffles and raisins, brewed in collaboration with Moondog Brewery and Matilda Bay for Good Beer Week).
- Three Golden Goats (a golden ale made to the recipe of Christchurch, New Zealand brewery, Three Brothers Brewing's Golden Ale, to raise money for the Christchurch earthquake relief fund).
- Abbey Collaby 2012 (an imperial stout with rum soaked oak chips, brewed in collaboration with Moondog Brewery and Matilda Bay for Good Beer Week).
- Abbey Collaby 2013 (an India Red Rye Rauchbier, brewed in collaboration with Moondog Brewery and Matilda Bay for Melbourne's Good Beer Week).
- The Village Goat (an Australian Brown Ale, brewed in collaboration with a Melbourne bar and restaurant, featuring British malts and Australian grown Summer and Galaxy hops).
- The Wheaty SchwartzHopf (a black pilsner featuring Saaz and Hallertau hops, brewed in collaboration with Tasmanian brewery, Moo Brew, and Adelaide venue, The Wheatsheaf Hotel.
- Abbey Collaby 2014 (a Barley Wine brewed in collaboration with Moondog Brewery and Matilda Bay for Good Beer Week).
- Abbey Collaby 2015 (a wet hopped Double IPA, brewed in collaboration with Moondog Brewery and Matilda Bay for Good Beer Week).
- Abbey Collaby 2016 (an Imperial Schwarzbier with Blackcurrant. A German inspired dark lager with a blackcurrant finish, brewed in collaboration with Moondog Brewery and Matilda Bay for Good Beer Week).
- Barn Burner (a black saison brewed with Crowbar, one of Australia's leading heavy music venues, for Brewvegas 2017).

== Cider ==
In late 2011, the brewery began to market an apple cider under the Two Step brand. The cider became widely available in early 2012 in 330ml bottles with twist-tops. Two Step cider has an alcohol content by volume of 5.0%. Bottle production of the cider ceased in October 2016.

== See also ==
- Australian pub
- Beer in Australia
- List of breweries in Australia
