= Pelican Brewing Company =

American brewery

- Logo
- Founded: 1996 in Pacific City, Oregon, United States
- Headquarters: Pacific City, Oregon, United States
- Website: pelicanbrewing.com

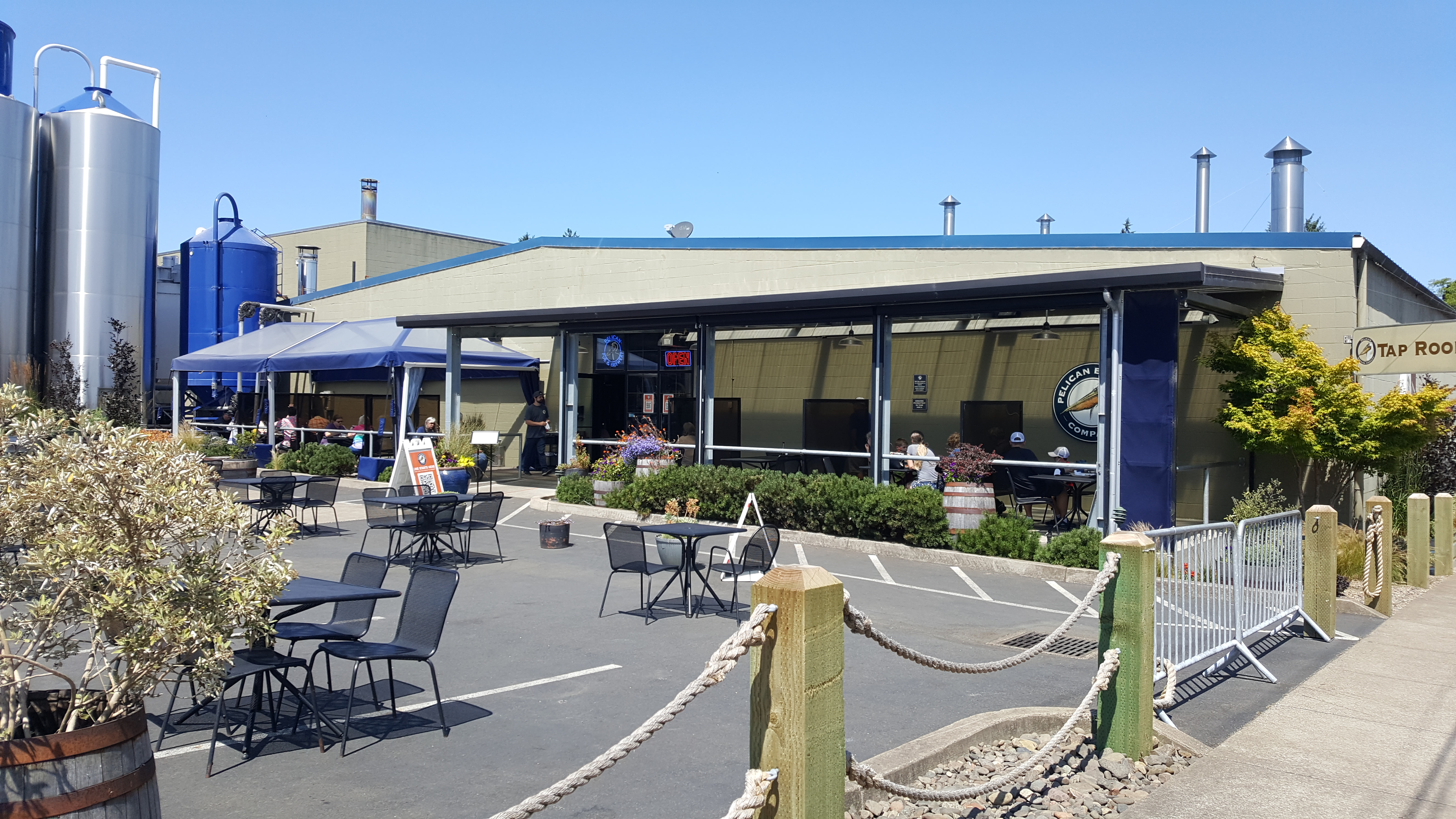
Exterior of the Tillamook location, 2021

Pelican Brewing Company is a brewery based in the U.S. state of Oregon. The company was established in Pacific City in 1996. There are also locations in Cannon Beach, Lincoln City, and Tillamook.

The company was recognized by the Australian International Beer Awards and the Oregon Beer Awards in 2021.

== Beers ==
Pelican offers a wide variety of both seasonal and year-round beers, including:

=== Year-round ===
- Kiwanda, Pre-Prohibition Cream Ale
- Raspberried at Sea, Ale with Raspberries
- Sea 'N Red, Irish-Style Red Ale
- Cape Crasher, PNW India Pale Ale
- Beak Breaker, Double India Pale Ale
- Tsunami, Export Stout
- Head Out, American Wheat beer
- Planet Nectaron, Nectaron Hop IPA
- Pelican Pilsner, Pilsner
- Paddleback, Oceanic Pale Ale
- Updrift, India Pale Ale
- Hazy Rock, Juicy India Pale Ale
- Hazestack, Double Hazy India Pale Ale
- Superswell, Double Pilsner

=== Seasonal ===
- Dark Hearted Blonde, Coffee Blonde Stout
- Wingwave, Dry-Hopped Lager
- Bronze God, Marzen-Style Lager
- Bad Santa, Cascadian Dark Ale
- Seahops, India Pale Ale
- Dune Climber, West Coast Hazy IPA
- Slide Tackle, Hazy India Pale Ale

=== Lone Pelican Series ===
- Volume I, Alder Smoked Stout
- Volume II, Triple Cold India Pale Ale
- Volume III, Summer India Pale Ale

=== Barrel-Aged Collection ===
- Siren of the Sea, Amber Ale
- South of the Breaker, Double India Pale Ale
- Captain of the Coast, Wee Heavy Ale
- Mother of all Storms, English-style Barleywine

== Non-Alcoholic Drinks ==
On June 16, 2022, Pelican Brewing launched its first non-alcoholic beverage in the form of Sparkle Hops—a hop-infused sparkling water beverage. The drink comes in two flavors: strata hops with açai and citra hops with lemon. The idea originated within Pelican's staff as a drink for brewers to drink while they were working on the brew deck.

== See also ==
- Brewing in Oregon
