= Feral Brewing Company =

Brewery in the Swan Valley, Western Australia

Coordinates: 31°47′52.5″S 116°2′4.57″E

- Industry: Alcoholic beverage
- Founded: October 2002
- Founders: Alistair Carragher; Brendan Varis
- Headquarters: Western Australia
- Products: Beer
- Production output: 5 million L (1.3 million US gal) annually
- Website: feralbrewing.com.au

The Feral Brewing Company is a brewery founded in the Swan Valley, Western Australia.

== History ==
Feral Brewing was founded by Alistair Carragher and Brendan Varis, and first opened in October 2002. Varis has a degree in brewing and fermentation science, while Carragher's background is in hospitality and sales.

In January 2012, Feral Brewing and Nail Brewing formed Brewcorp developing a brewhouse and warehouse facilities in Bassendean. In October 2017, Feral Brewing was bought by Coca-Cola Amatil.

In late 2024, Coca-Cola Europacific Partners sold Feral Brewing to a group of independent owners.

== Brew Pub ==
Feral Brewing closed its Swan Valley Brewpub in 2021, becoming Slumdog Brewing.

== Beers ==
- Raging Flem (7.6% alc/vol), a Belgian-style India Pale Ale
- Feral White (4.6% alc/vol), a Belgian-style Witbier.
- Hop Hog (5.8% alc/vol), an American-style India Pale Ale
- Golden Ace (5.6% alc/vol), a Belgian-style Golden Ale
- Smoked Porter (4.7% alc/vol), a smoked beer
- Watermelon Warhead (2.9% alc/vol), a Berliner Weisse infused with watermelons
- Runt (4.7% alc/vol), an Australian Pale Ale
- Rust (6.0% alc/vol), a Belgian-style Dubbel
- Karma Citra (5.8% alc/vol), a Black India Pale Ale
- Fantapants (7.4% alc/vol), an Imperial Red India Pale Ale
- Razorback (10% alc/vol), a Barleywine
- Boris (11.5%), a Russian Imperial Stout
- Amber (3.6% alc/vol), an Australian style Amber Ale
- B.F.H (Barrel Fermented Hog) (5.8% alc/vol), a barrel fermented American Pale Ale
- White Hog (4.8% alc/vol), a Belgian-style Pale Ale
- "War Hog" (7.5%) American IPA
- “Biggie Juice” (6.0%) New England India Pale Ale

== Awards ==
The Feral Brewing Company has won a number of awards including from the Australian International Beer Awards:

- 2009: Champion Hybrid Beer – Feral White
- 2009: Champion Small Brewery
- 2009: Champion Exhibitor
- 2009: Champion Ale – Hop Hog
- 2010: Champion Ale – The Runt
- 2011: Champion Ale – Hop Hog
- 2011: Best Beer – Hop Hog
- 2012: Champion Large Australian Brewery
- 2012: Best International Pale Ale Hop Hog
- 2012: Best Scotch and Barley Wine Razorback
- 2013: Champion Medium Australian Brewery
- 2013: Best Porter – Boris

From the Perth Royal Beer Show:

- 2010: Best Commercial Brewery
- 2010: Best Commercial Beer – Hop Hog
- 2010: Best Western Australian Brewery
- 2010: Best Western Australian Beer – Hop Hog
- 2011: Best American Style Pale Ale – Hop Hog
- 2011: Best Indian Pale Ale – Fanta Pants
- 2011: Best Ale Draught – Fanta Pants
- 2011: Best Western Australian Beer – Hop Hog
- 2012: Best American Style Pale Ale – Hop Hog

From the Beer and Brewer People's Choice Awards:

- 2011: Best Australian Beer – Hop Hog
- 2012: Young Brewer of the Year – Will Irving
- 2012: Best Australian Beer – Hop Hog

From the Hong Kong International Beer Awards:

- 2012: Best Indian Pale Ale & Champion Beer – Hop Hog

From the Western Australian Tourism Awards:

- 2012: Tourism Wineries, Distilleries and Breweries – Gold

From GABS Hottest 100 Aussie Craft Beers of the Year

- 2012: People's Choice Winner – Hop Hog
- 2013: People's Choice Winner – Hop Hog
- 2014: People's Choice Winner – Hop Hog

== See also ==
- List of breweries in Australia
