= 4 Pines Brewing Company =

Australian craft brewery

- Industry: Alcoholic beverage
- Founded: 2008; 18 years ago
- Headquarters: Unit 3B, 9-13 Winbourne Road, Brookvale, New South Wales
- Products: Beer
- Owner: Asahi Breweries
- Website: www.4pinesbeer.com.au

The 4 Pines Brewing Company is an Australian craft brewery and hospitality business based on the Northern Beaches of Sydney.

== History ==
First established in 2008 as a 5hL brewpub in Manly, New South Wales the company opened a new brewing facility in Brookvale in 2011 with a 50hL brewhouse, bottling line, and bar. The company's name refers to the removal of four pine trees to install a machine gun during the Second World War.

In 2017, 4 Pines Brewing Company was purchased by AB InBev through its venture capital arm, ZX Ventures. This allowed the company to use the brewing and distribution network of Carlton & United Breweries (CUB) which was acquired by AB InBev in 2016.

In 2019, CUB confirmed that 4 Pines Brewing Company would be included in the sale of CUB to Asahi Breweries.

In addition to its wholesale brewing activities, 4 Pines has a significant hospitality business. As of August 2020 there are a total of ten permanent 4 Pines branded bars across New South Wales, Victoria, and Queensland in addition to pop-up bars at Docklands Stadium and the Sydney Cricket Ground.

=== Brookvale Union ===
4 Pines Brewing Company releases 'Ready to drink' alcoholic beverages under its 'Brookvale Union' brand.

== Notable Achievements ==
In 2010 the company, in partnership with space engineering firm, Saber Astronautics Australia, worked on developing the first space-certified beer.

At the inaugural Craft Beer Industry Awards in 2014 4 Pines Brewing Company and Two Birds Brewing were named joint winners of the 'Bintani Champion Large Brewery Award', with the company also winning the 'Champion Pale Ale' for its ESB.

In 2015 4 Pines Brewing Company won the 'GrainCorp Trophy for Champion Large Australian Brewery' at the Australian International Beer Awards (AIBA). It received the "Best for the World" award from Beer & Brewer four times, including in 2022.

== Products ==
Core Range Beers

- Japanese Style Lager - a modern dry rice lager (4.5% alc/vol)
- Hazy Pale Ale - a juicy, tropical hazy Pale Ale (6.0% alc/vol)
- Pale Ale - an American style Pale Ale (5.1% alc/vol)
- Amber Ale - an American style amber ale (5.1% alc/vol)
- New World Pale Ale - a modern Pale Ale with fruit forward hops (4.2% alc/vol)
- Pacific Ale - A mid-strength pale ale (3.5% alc/vol)
- Nitro Stout - a dry Irish stout infused with nitrogen gas (5.1% alc/vol)
- Draught - a German style golden ale (4.6% alc/vol)
- Ultra Low - an ultra refreshing, ultra low alcohol beer (<0.5% alc/vol)

Brookvale Union

- Ginger Beer (4.0% alc/vol)
- Spiced Rum Ginger Beer with lime (4.0% alc/vol)
- Vodka and Peach Iced Tea (4.0% alc/vol)
- Vodka Lemon Lime and Bitters (4.0% alc/vol)
- Boozy Seltzer - Grapefruit; Lime and Orange Bitters (4.0% alc/vol)

== See also ==
- Australian pub
- Beer in Australia
- List of breweries in Australia

== Bibliography ==
- Deutsher, Keith M. (2012). The Breweries of Australia (2nd ed.). Glebe, NSW: Beer & Brewer Media. ISBN 978-0-98739-521-4.
