= De Halve Maan =

Beer brewery in Bruges, Belgium

Brouwerij De Halve Maan
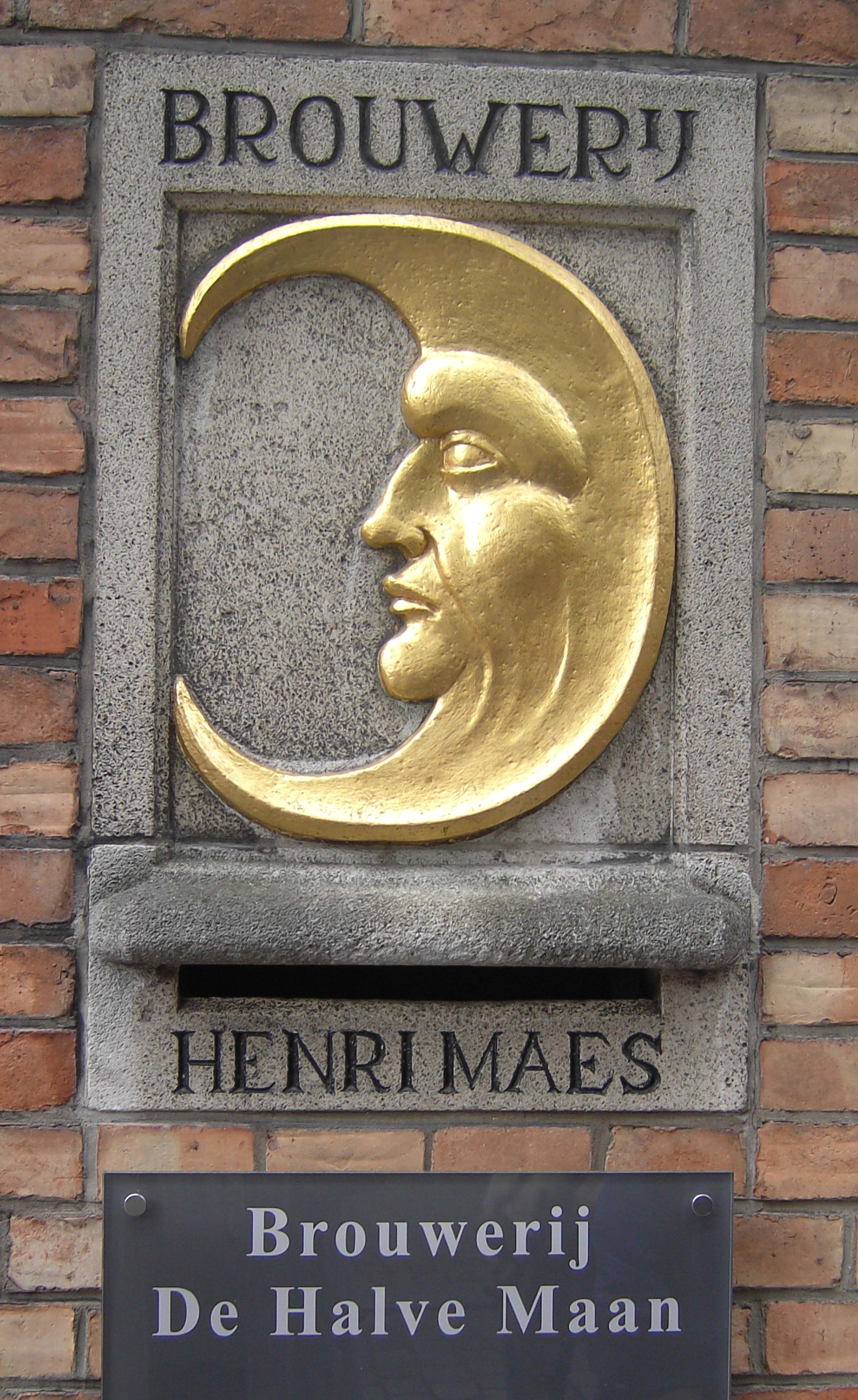
- Industry: Alcoholic beverage
- Founded: 1856
- Founder: Leon "Henri" Maes
- Headquarters: Bruges, Belgium
- Key people: Xavier Vanneste
- Products: Beer

De Halve Maan (The Half Moon) is a beer brewery in Bruges, Belgium. De Halve Maan brews Brugse Zot ("Bruges Fool"), Straffe Hendrik ("Strong Henri"), Blanche de Bruges/Brugs Tarwebier and other beers. The Straffe Hendrik and Blanche de Bruges/Brugs Tarwebier brands had been sold to other breweries, but De Halve Maan has recently bought them back and is returning production to Bruges.

Beer has been brewed at De Halve Maan's location for approximately 500 years. The current brewery has been operating since 1856. The brewery has been in the same family for five generations. The brewery was called Henri Maes until the late 1990s. The Henri Maes brewery offered home delivery by horse, and later by truck, after World War II.

In 2016 De Halve Maan completed a 3,276-metre-long (2 mi) beer pipeline from its brewery to its bottling plant to avoid having to send trucks through the narrow, cobbled streets of Bruges. At its deepest point, the pipeline runs 34 metres (112 ft) below the surface. The pipeline was partially crowdsourced, and those who contributed received free beer from the brewery.
