= Nøgne Ø =

Norwegian brewery

- Type: Brewery
- Location: Grimstad, Agder, Norway Lunde 8
- Opened: 2002
- Key people: Tore Nybø, Tom Young, Arne Edvard Rosland Hortemo, Martin Houge, Sverre Orm Øverland, Astrid Grov, Kamil Krystjanczuk, Joachim Tellefsen, Morten Kittelsen, Alf Reidar Robstad
- Annual production volume: 20.000hl (2021)
- Employees: 10
- Parent: Hansa Borg Bryggerier
- Website: https://www.nogne-o.com/

Active beers
See list
Name	Type

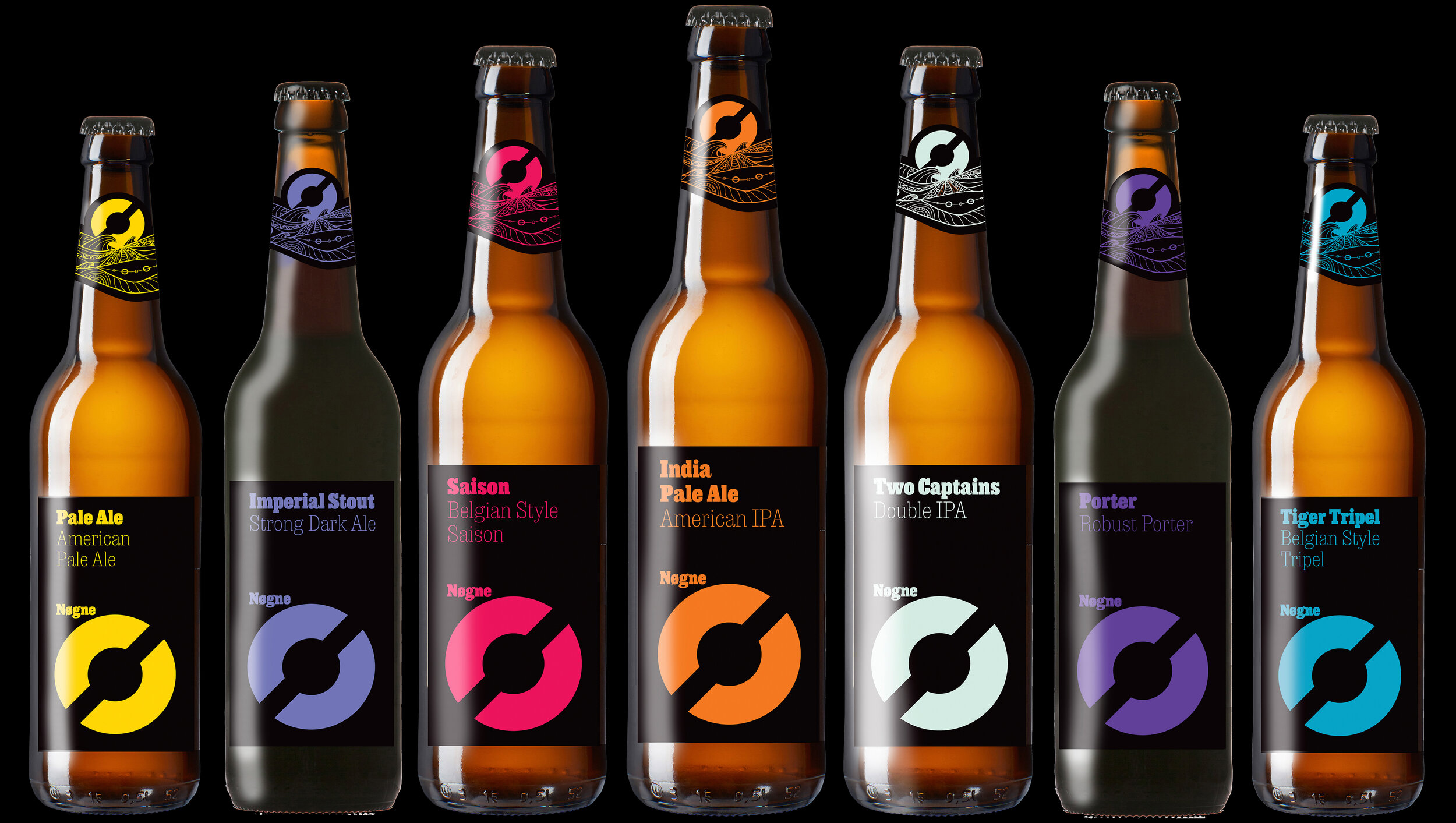
A selection of Nøgne Ø beers

Nøgne Ø is a Norwegian brewery founded in January 2002 by Gunnar Wiig and Kjetil Jikiun. The name is Norwegian for "Naked Isle" and was selected from the 19th-century Norwegian poem Terje Vigen by Henrik Ibsen. In most years since 2006, the brewery has been on RateBeer's list of top 100 breweries in the world.

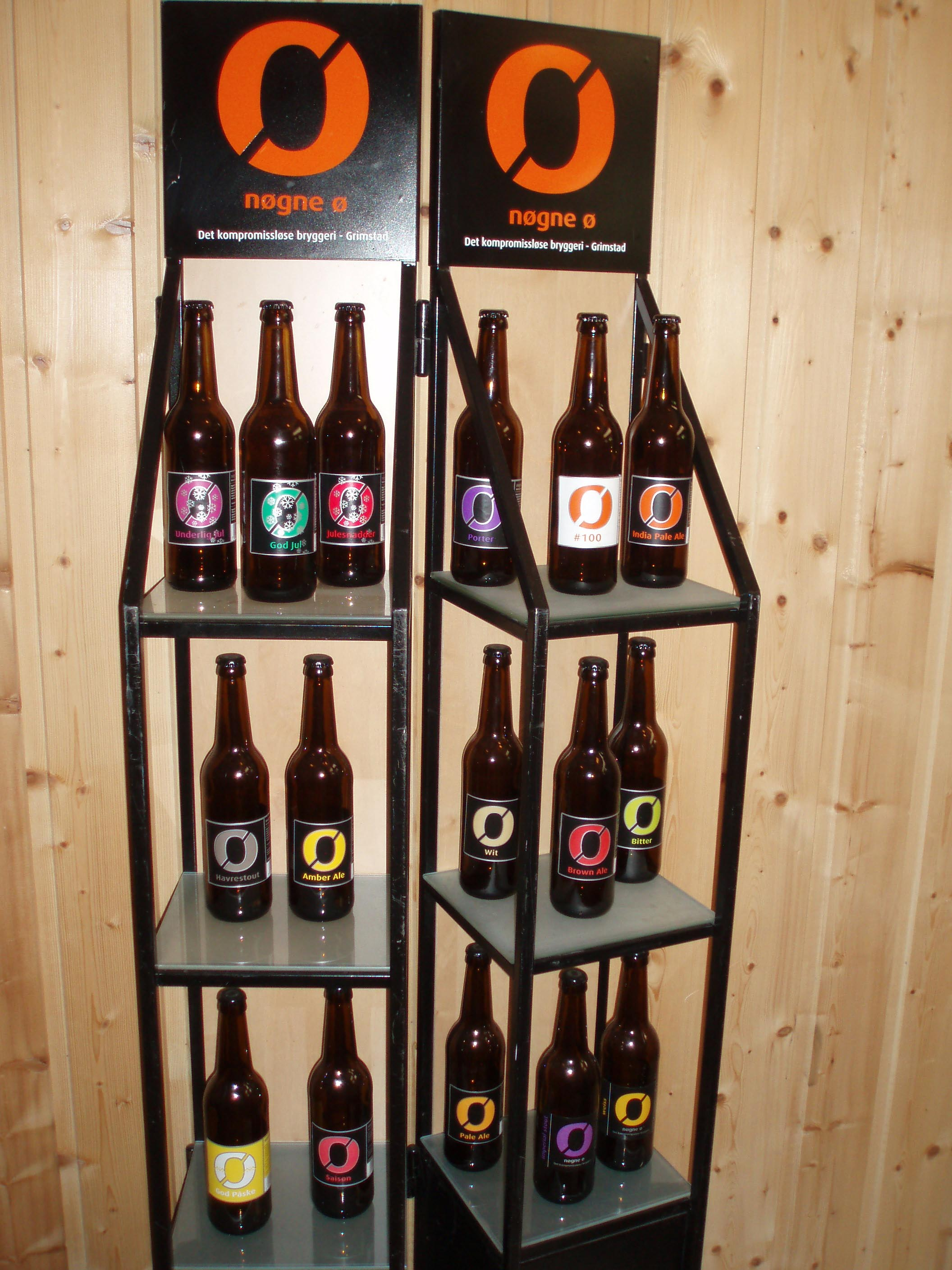

== History ==
The brewery has grown from a 300 hl production in 2003 to an estimated 20000 hl production in 2015. They make more than 30 different styles of ales, and have an export to more than 40 markets. On November 25, 2013 Hansa Borg Bryggerier acquired a majority share in Nøgne Ø. This enabled them to export their beer to more countries.

Kjetil Jikiun left the brewery in July 2015. They moved to a new brewing facilities next to their old brewery in Grimstad in June 2017.

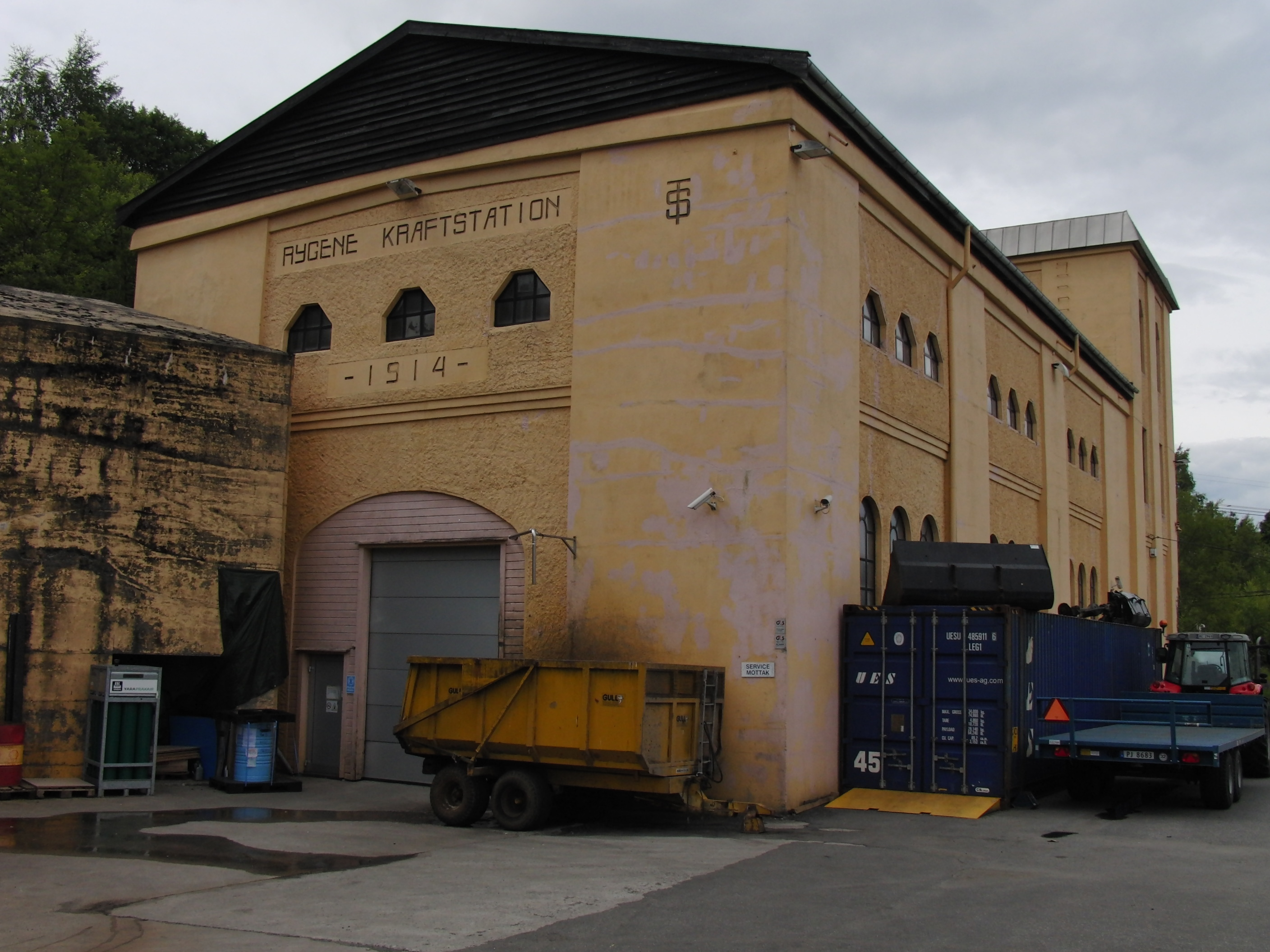
Nøgne Ø, old Rygene

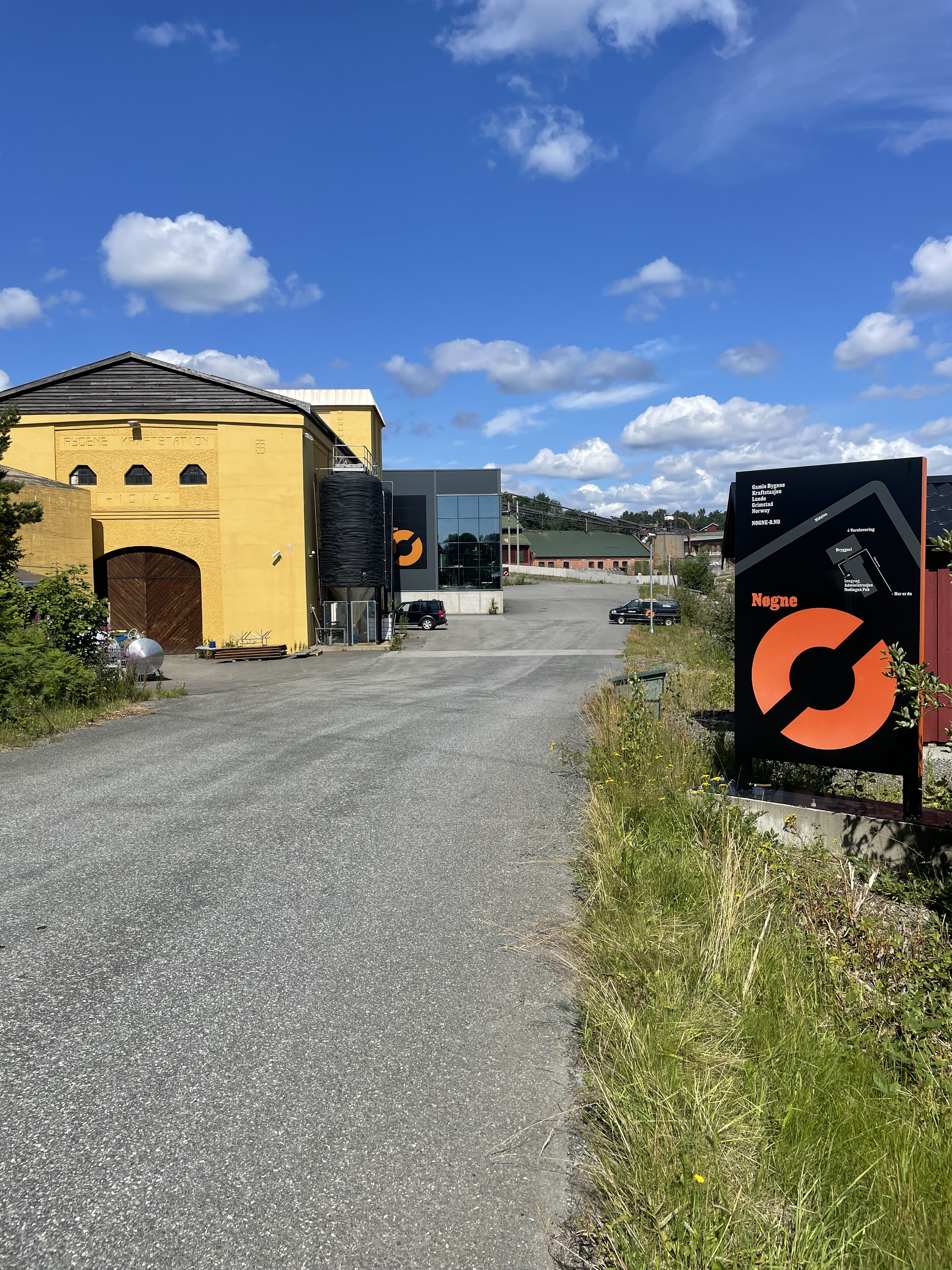
Nøgne Ø in the old Rygene Kraftstasjon ( Rygene power station )

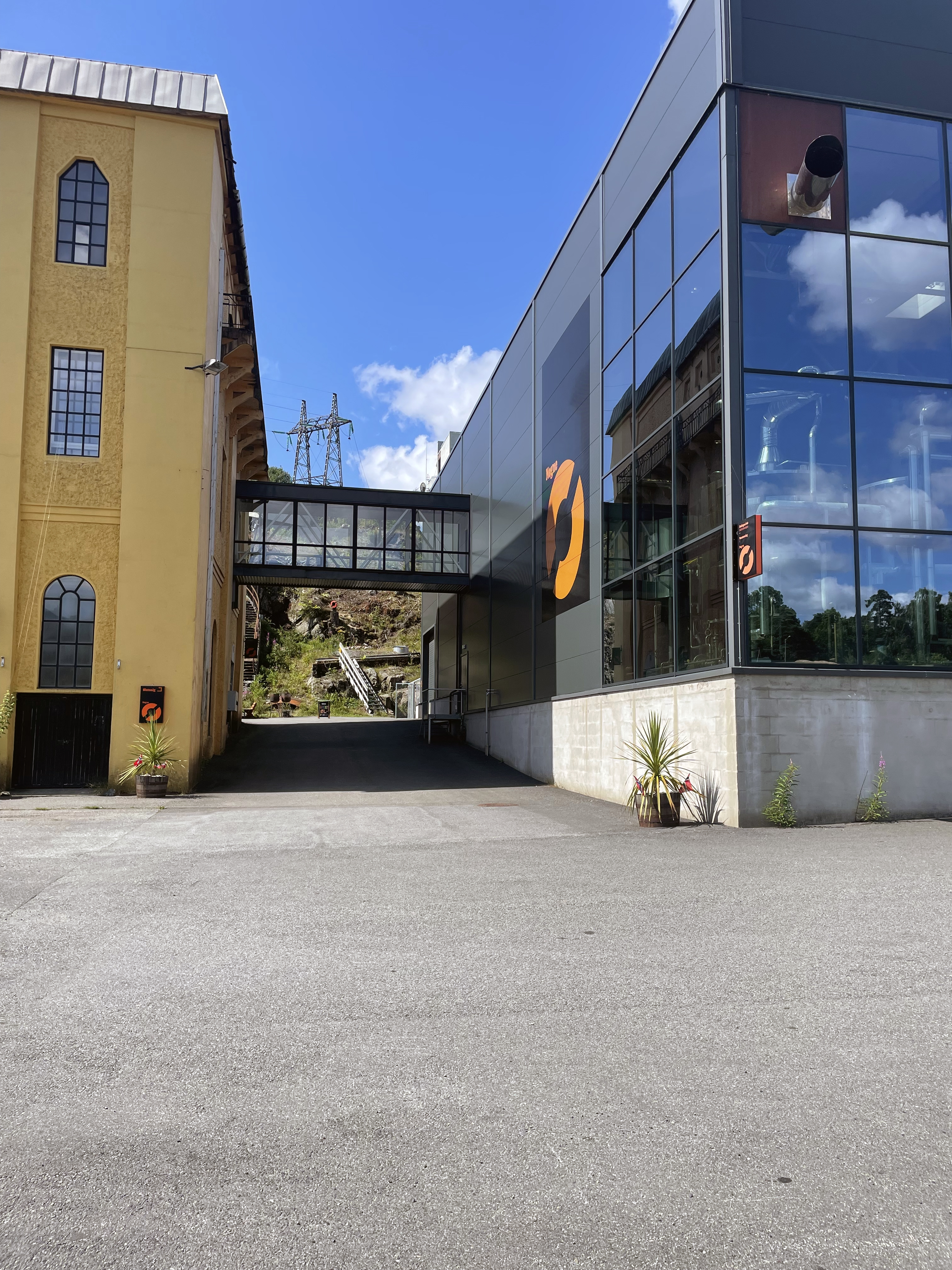
Nøgne Ø brewery building

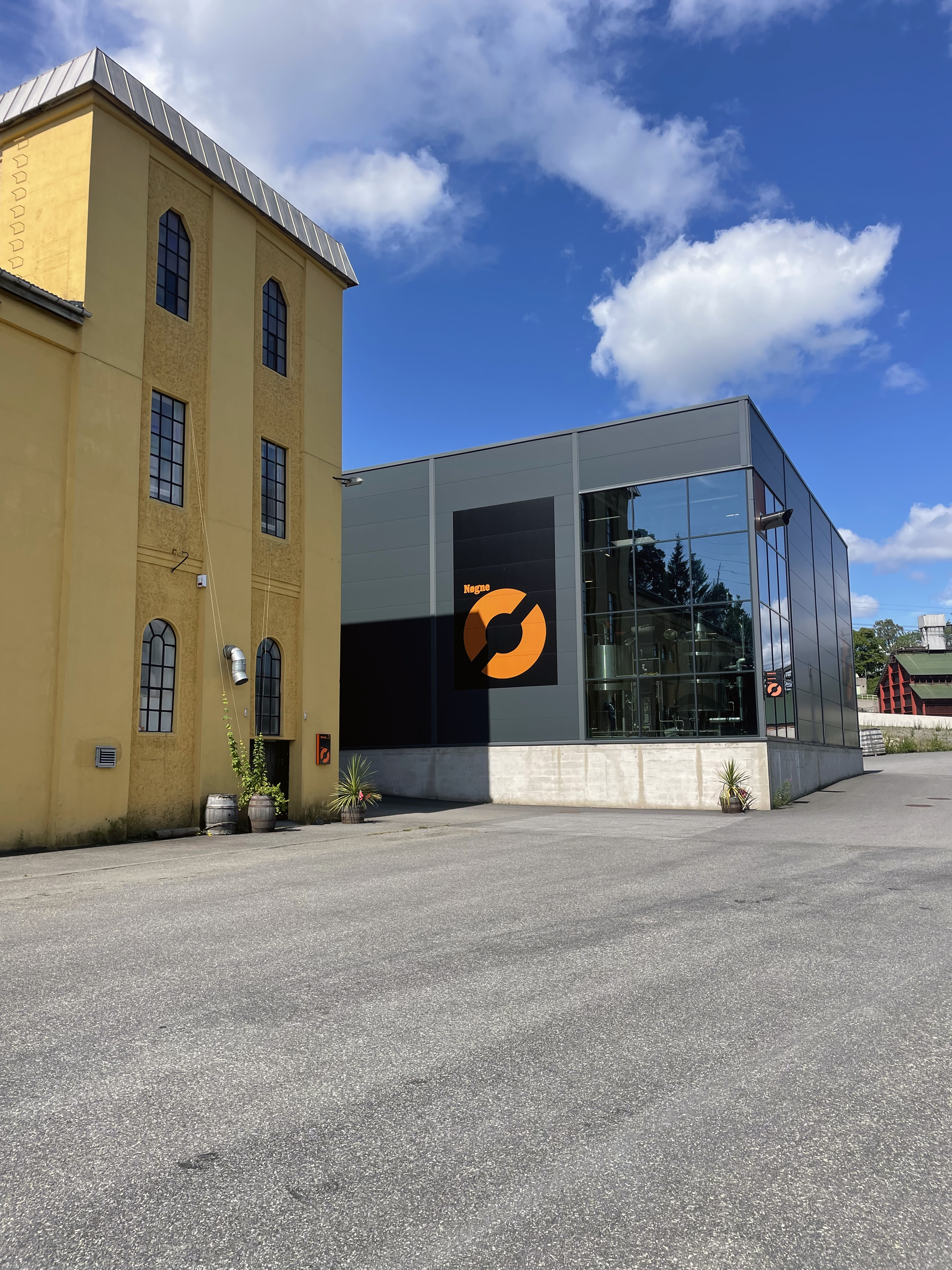
Nøgne Ø, brewery

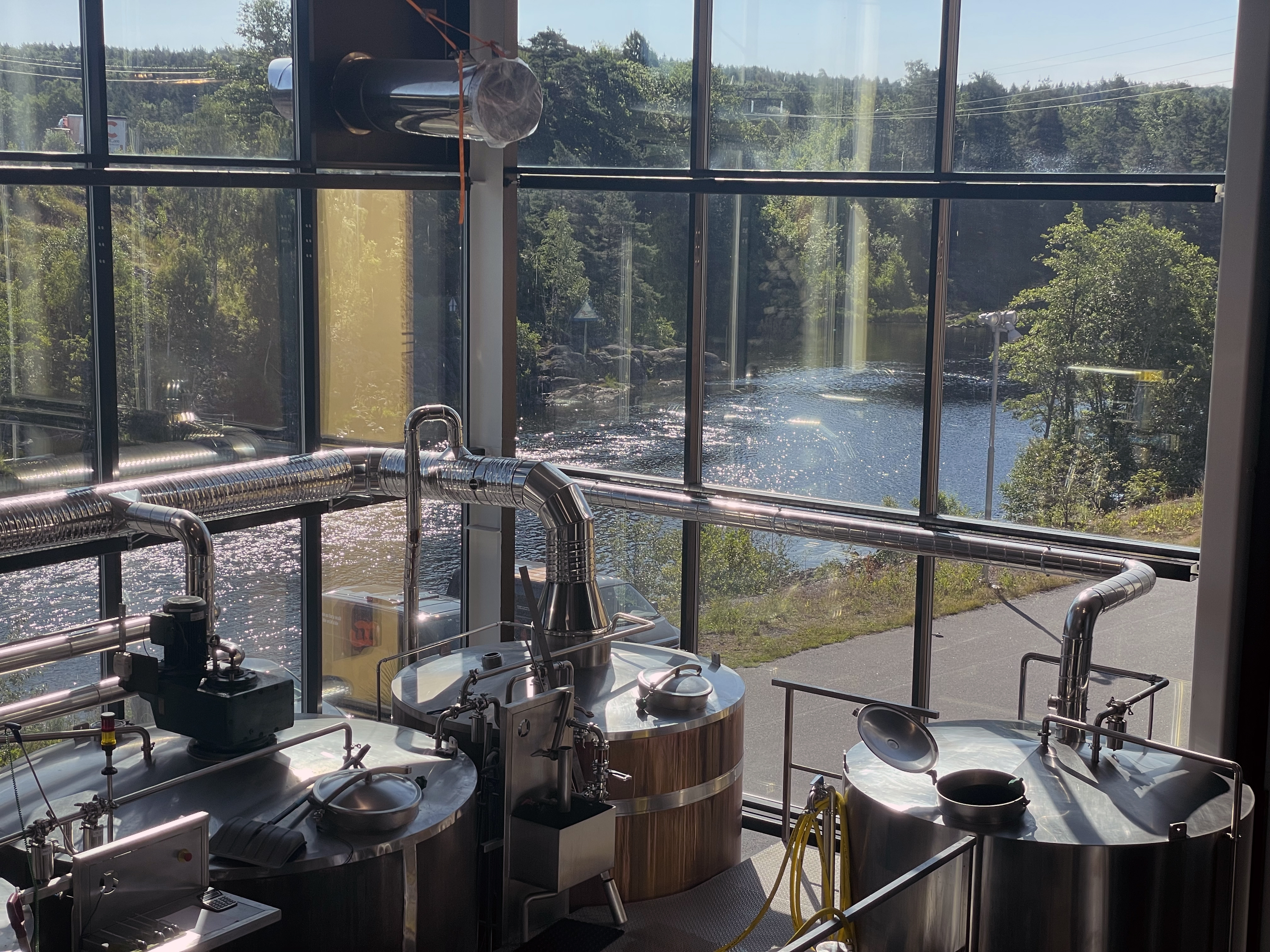
Nøgne Ø brewery

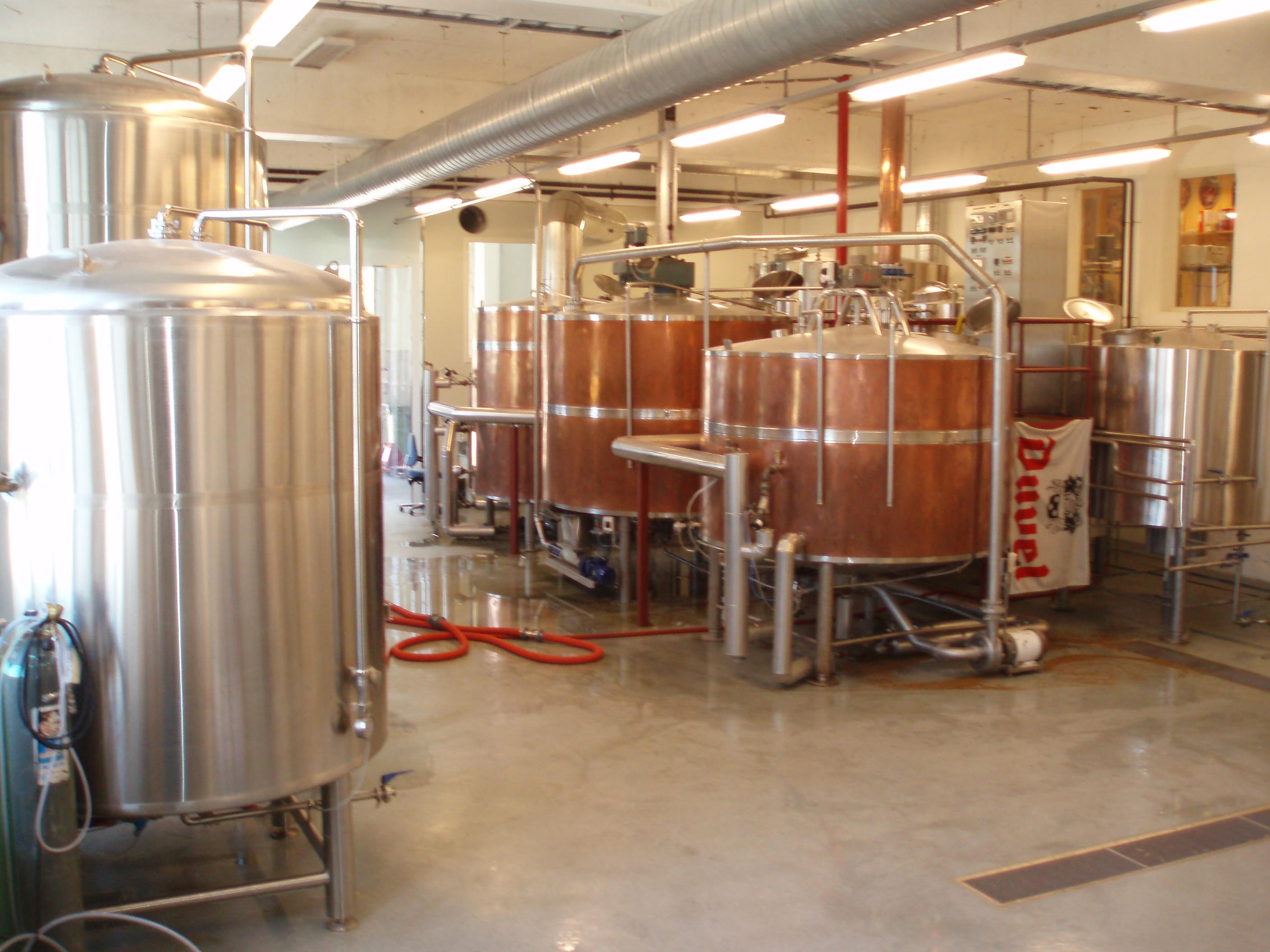
From Production, Nøgne Ø

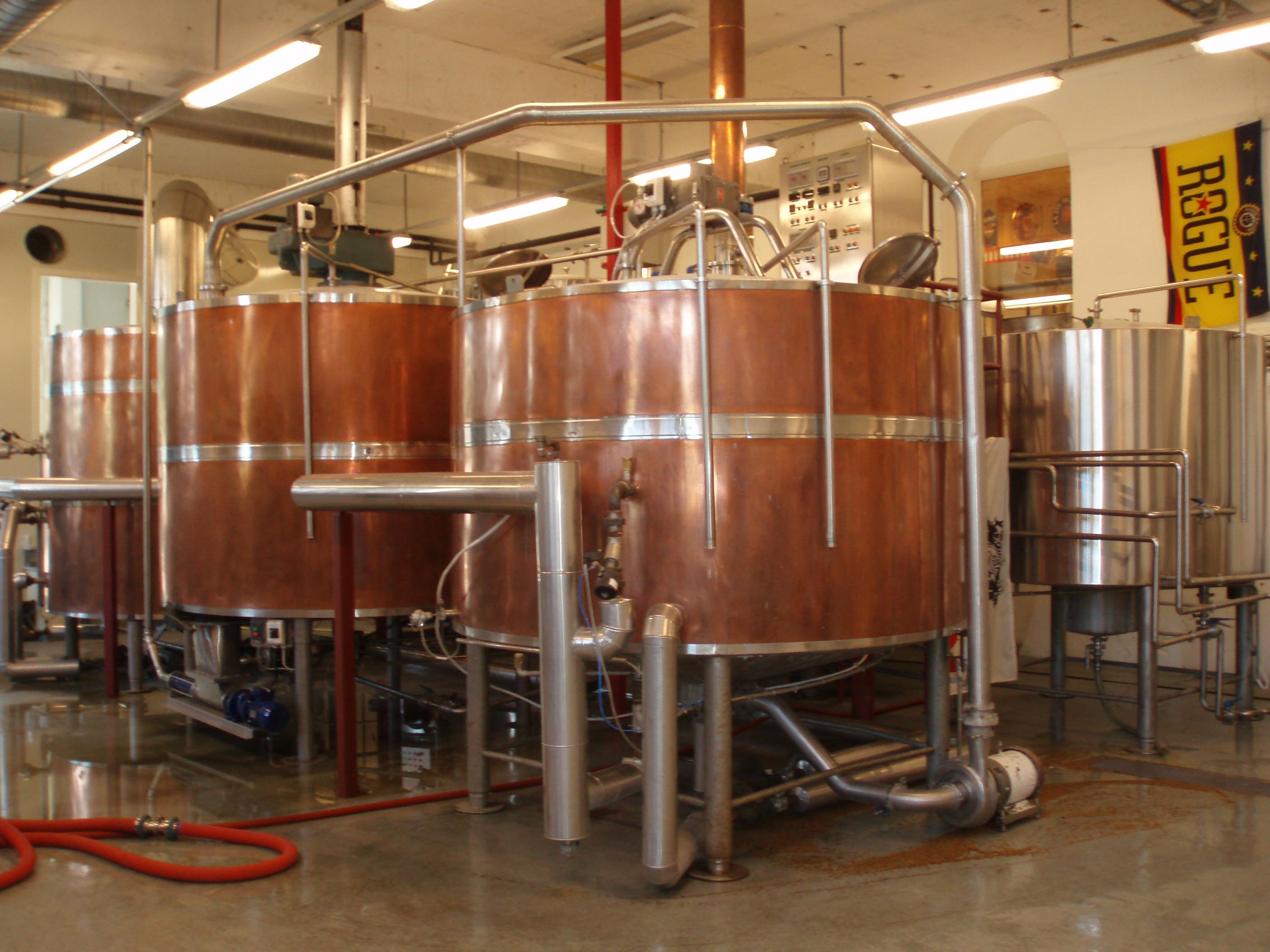
Brewery

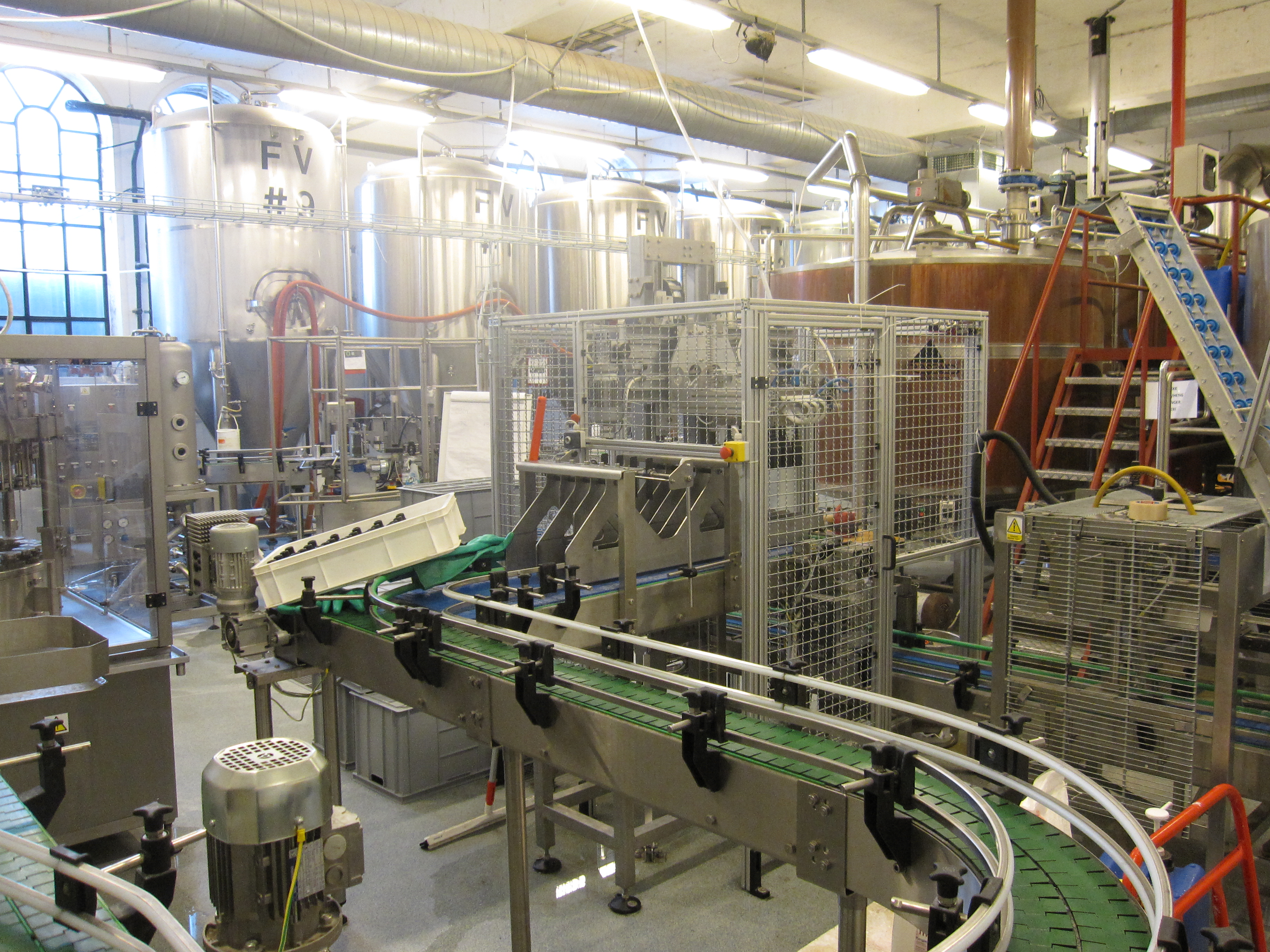
Production at Nøgne Ø

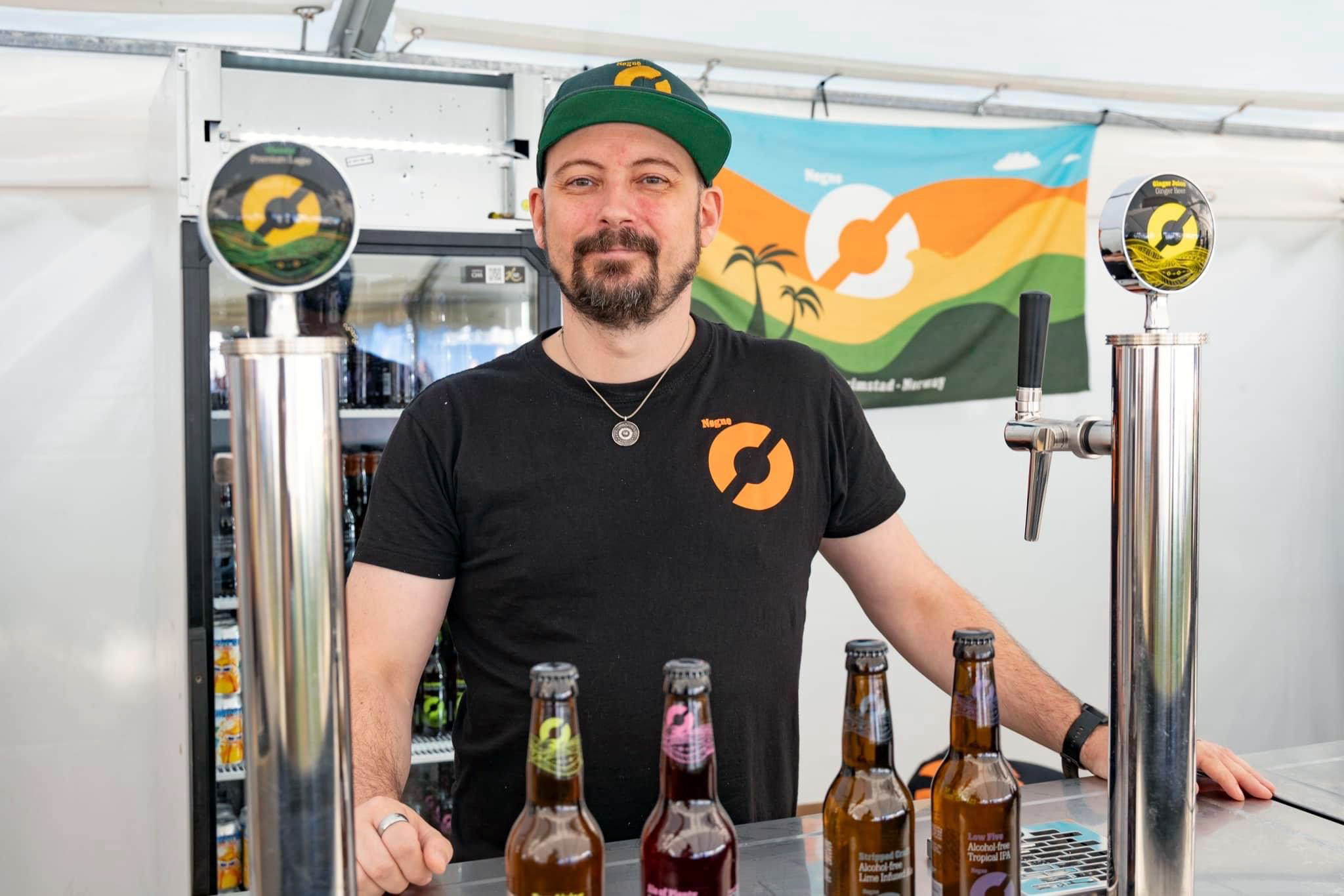
Beer from Nøgne Ø

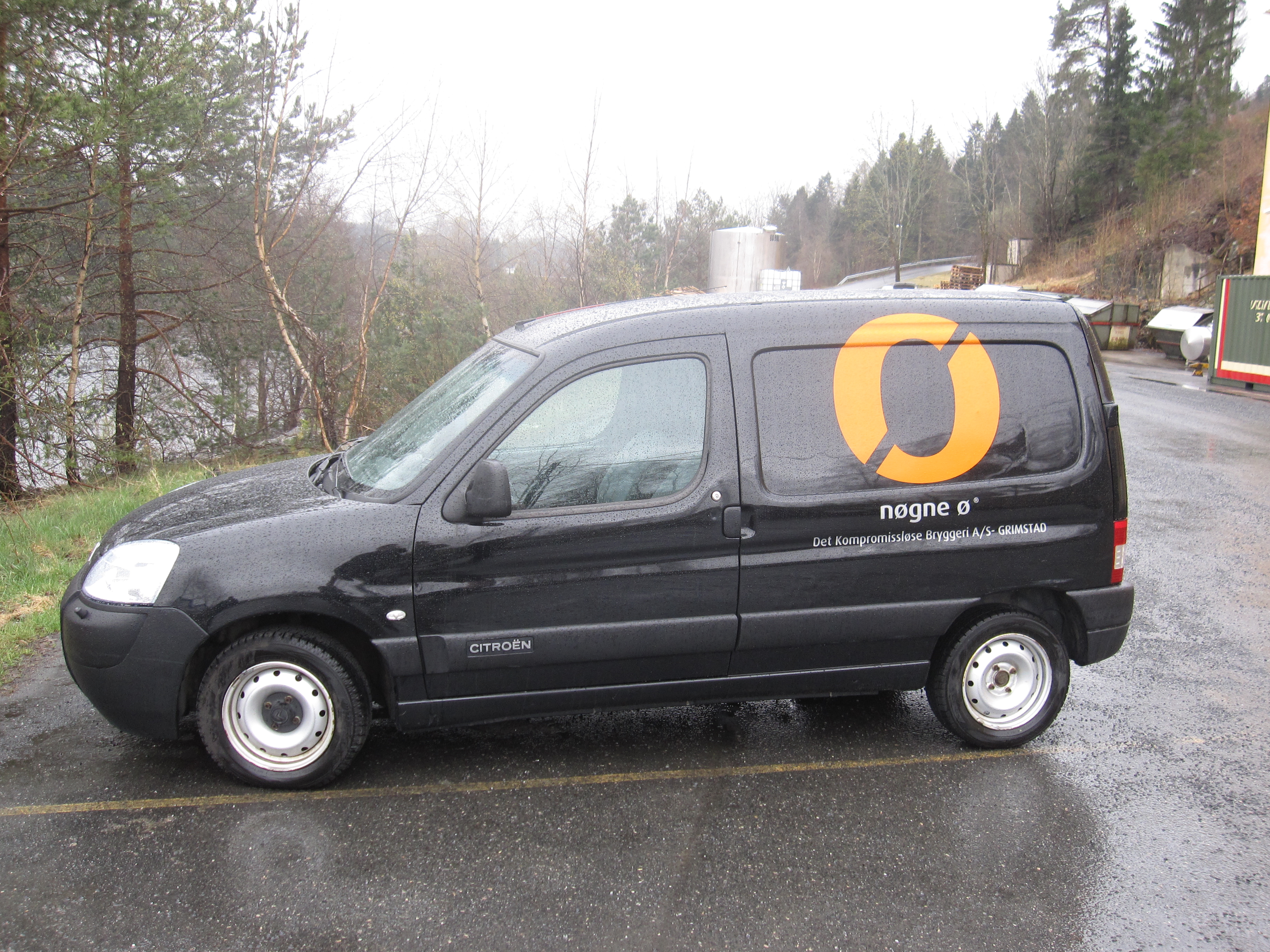
Nøgne Ø’s car

== Beers ==
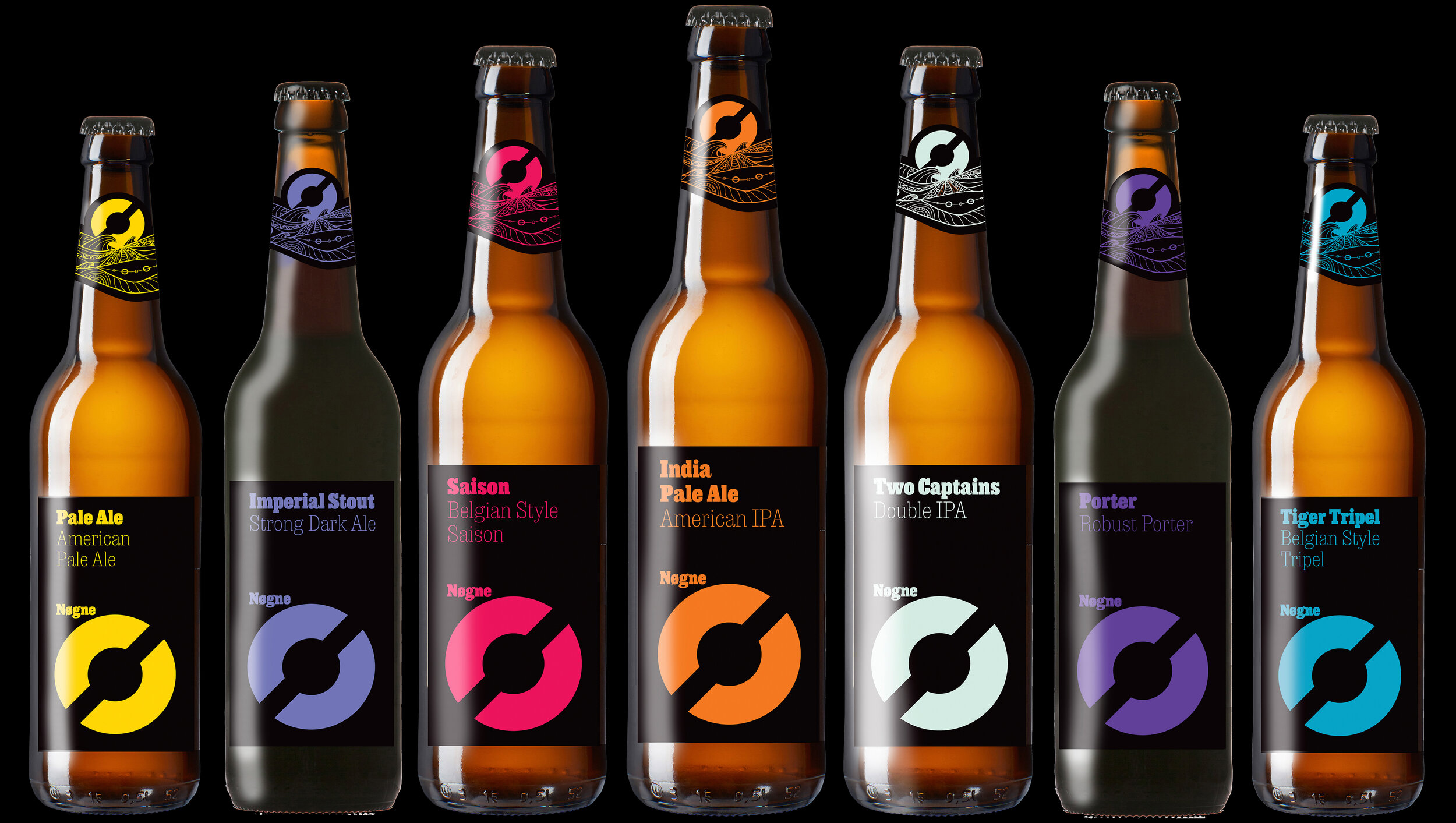

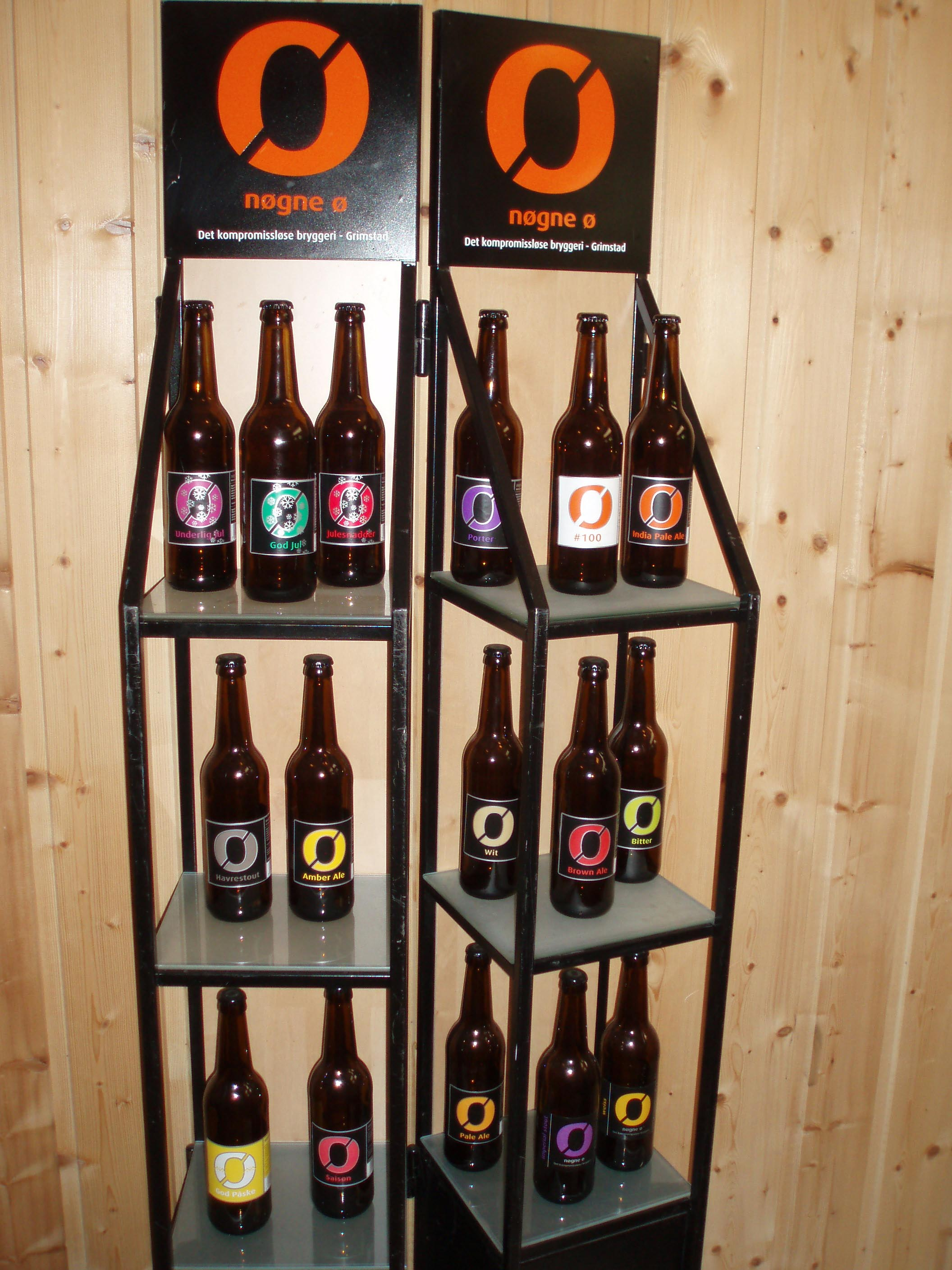

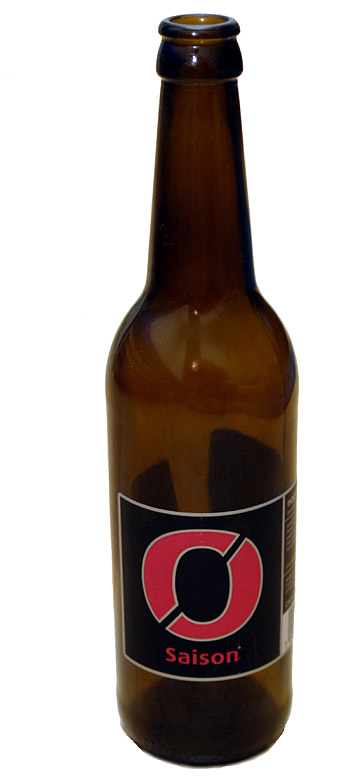
Nøgne Ø Saison, (Season)

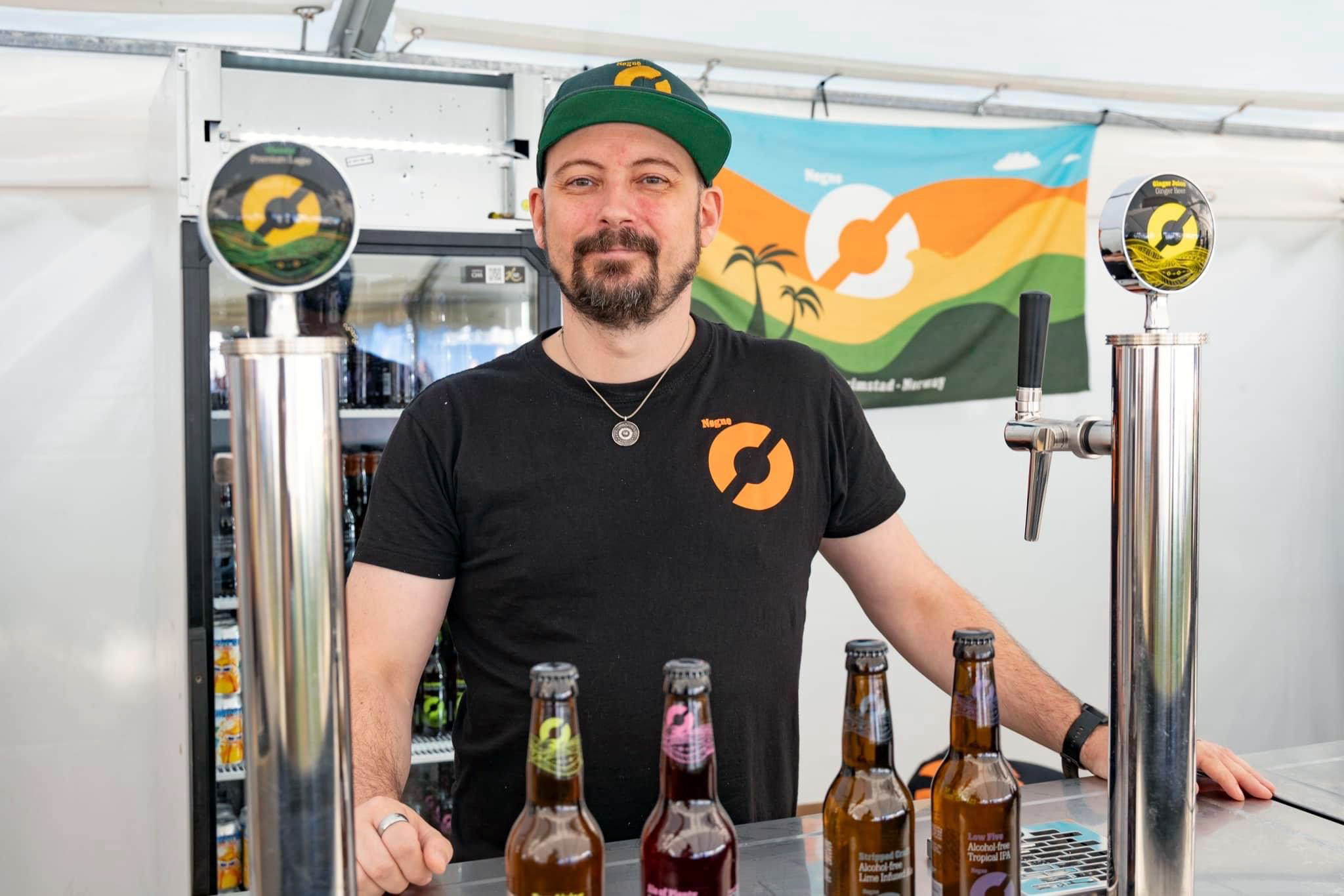
Beer from Nøgne Ø

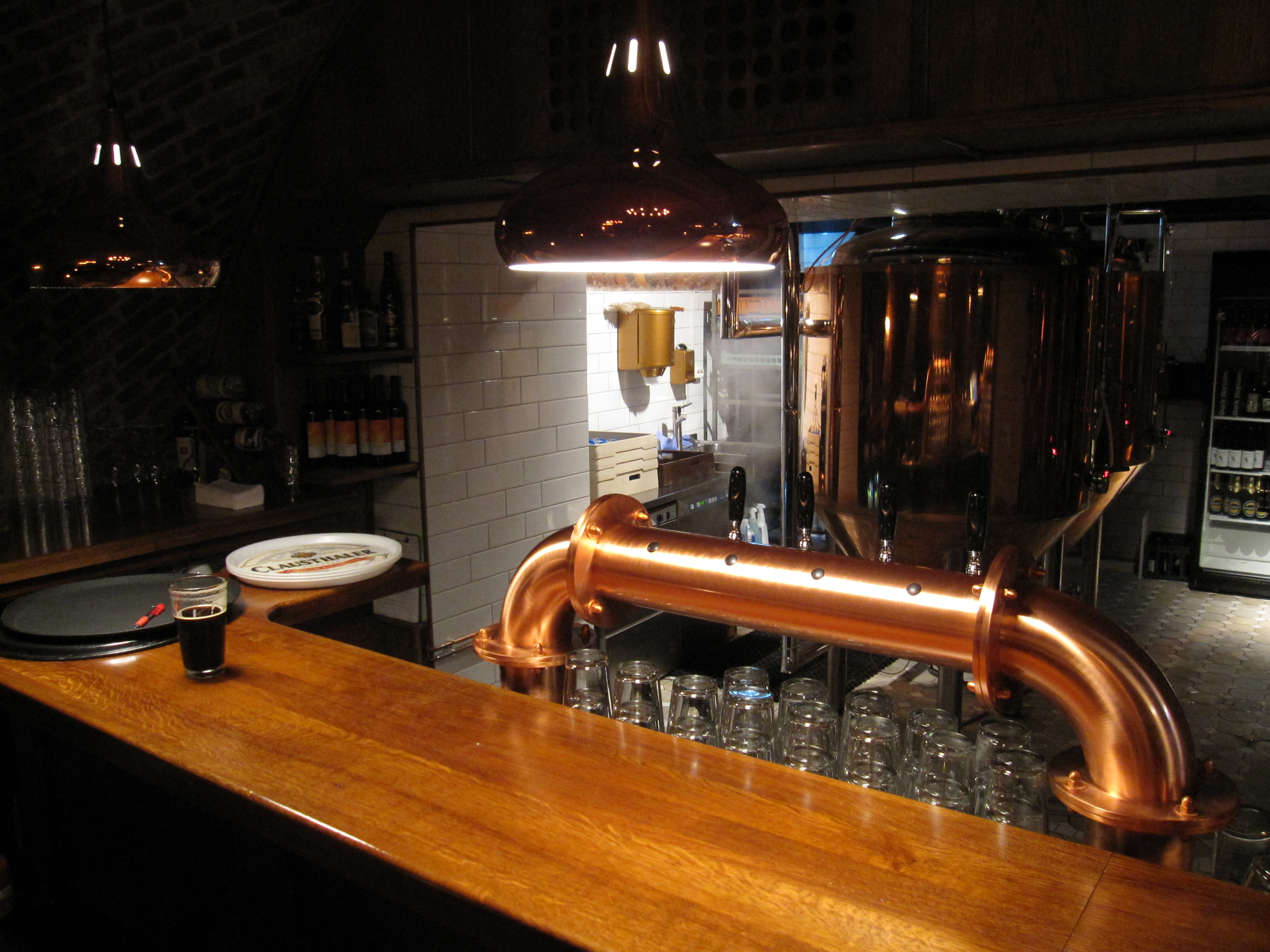
Beer from Nøgne Ø at Schouskjelleren Microbrewery

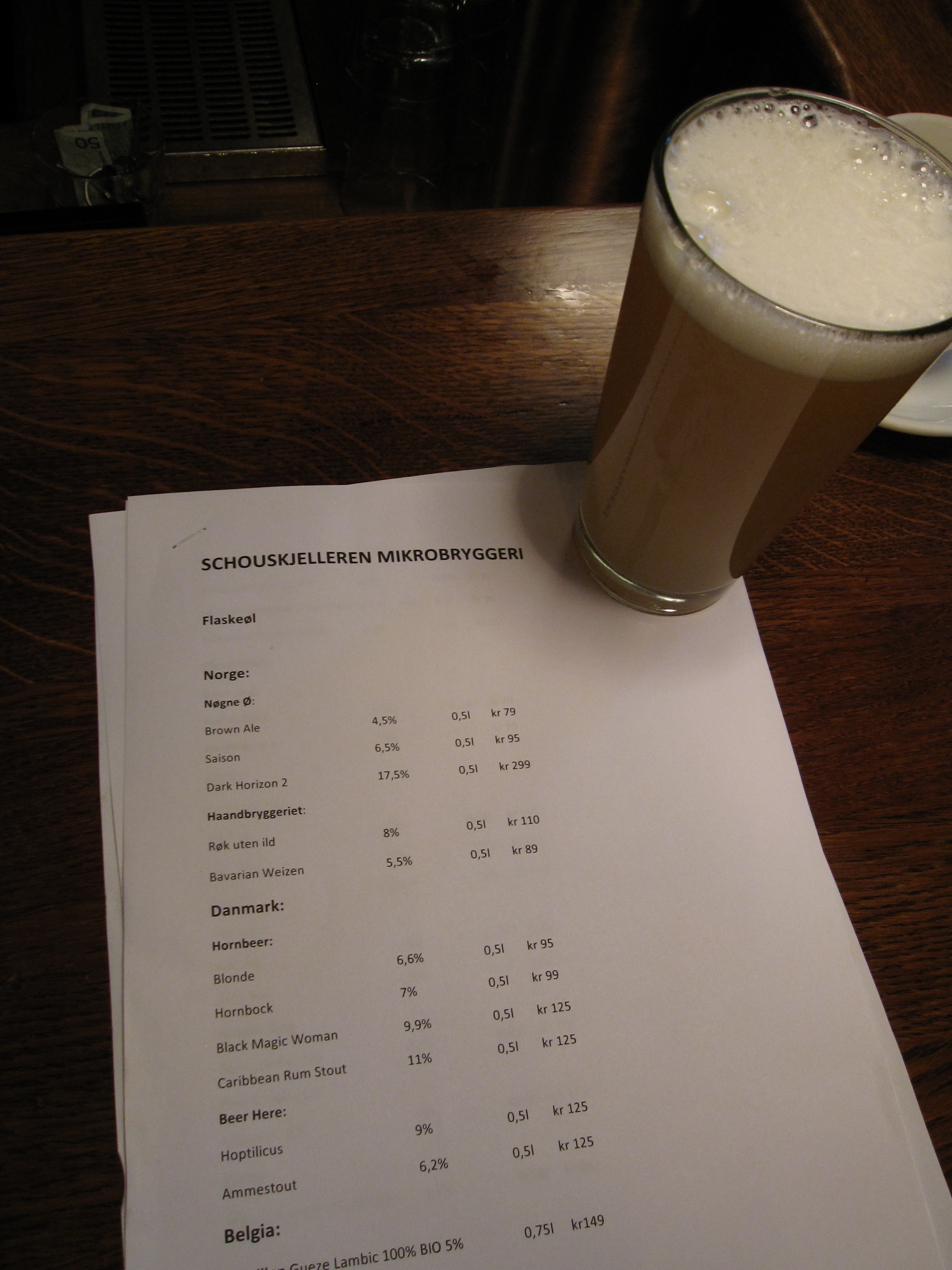
Brown Ale, Saison & Dark Horizon 2 beer from Nøgne Ø at Schouskjelleren Microbrewery

=== Core range ===
- #100 - Hopped Barley Wine - 10% ABV
- #500 - Imperial India Pale Ale - 10% ABV
- 4885 - Blanc - 4,5% ABV
- Southern IPA - NORWIPA - 4,5% ABV
- Asian Pale Ale - Lemongrass Infused Ale - 4,5 % ABV
- Blonde - Belgian Blonde Ale - 4,5 % ABV
- Brown Ale - Traditional British Ale - 4,5 % ABV
- Global Pale Ale - Hoppy Pale Ale - 4,5 % ABV
- Imperial Stout - Strong Dark Ale - 9% ABV
- Imperial Brown Ale - Double Brown Ale - 7,5 % ABV
- India Pale Ale - American IPA - 7,5 % ABV
- Porter - Robust Porter - 7% ABV
- Saison - Belgian Style Saison - 6,5 % ABV
- Tiger Triple - Belgian Style Triple - 9% ABV
- Two Captains - Double IPA - 8,5 % ABV
- Wit - Belgian Spiced Ale - 4,5 % ABV
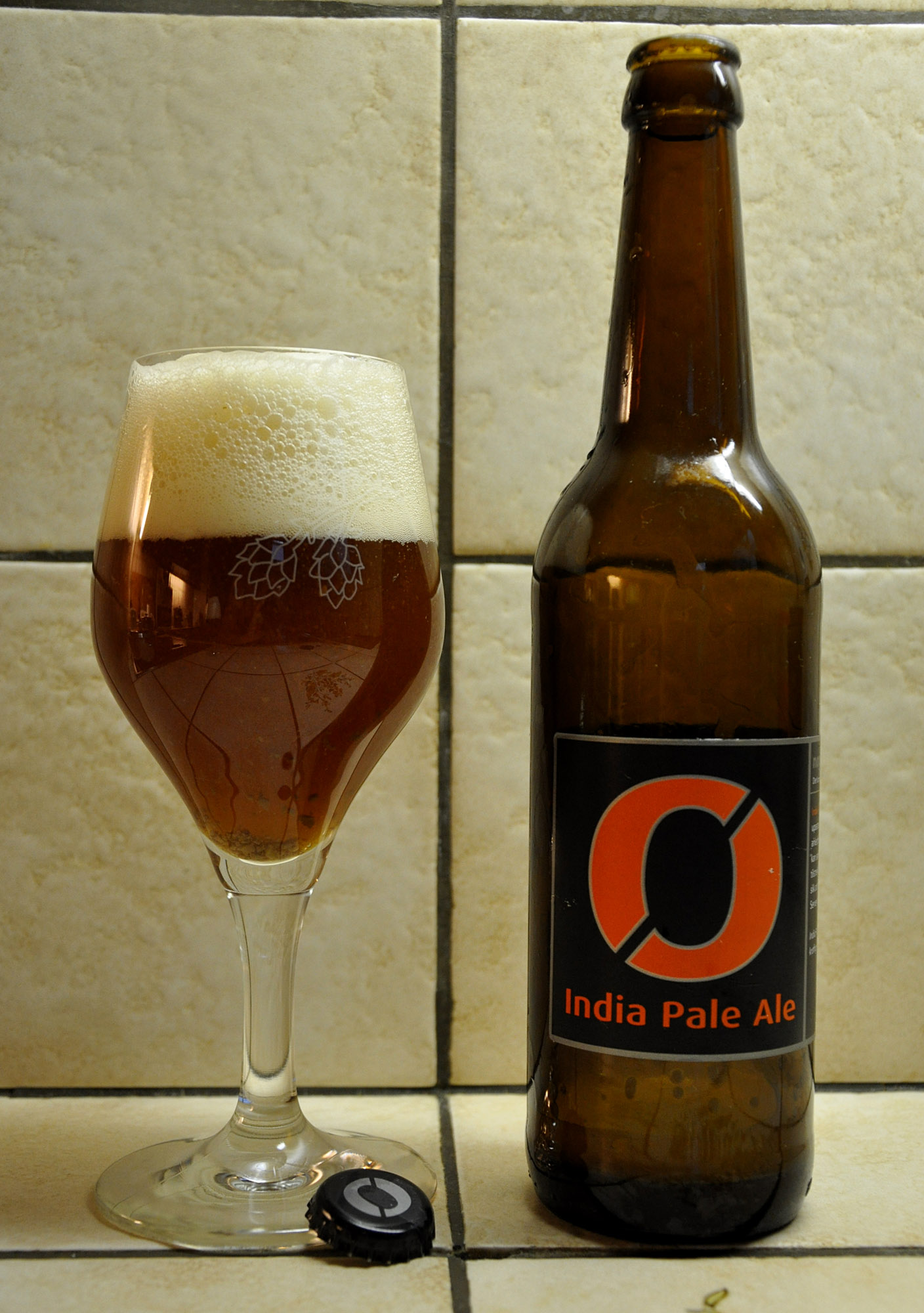
IPA

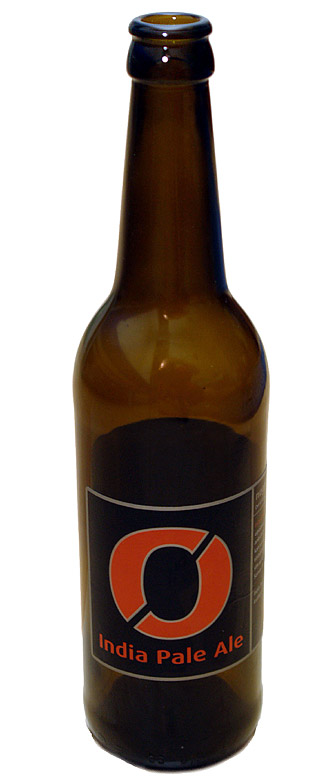
IPA

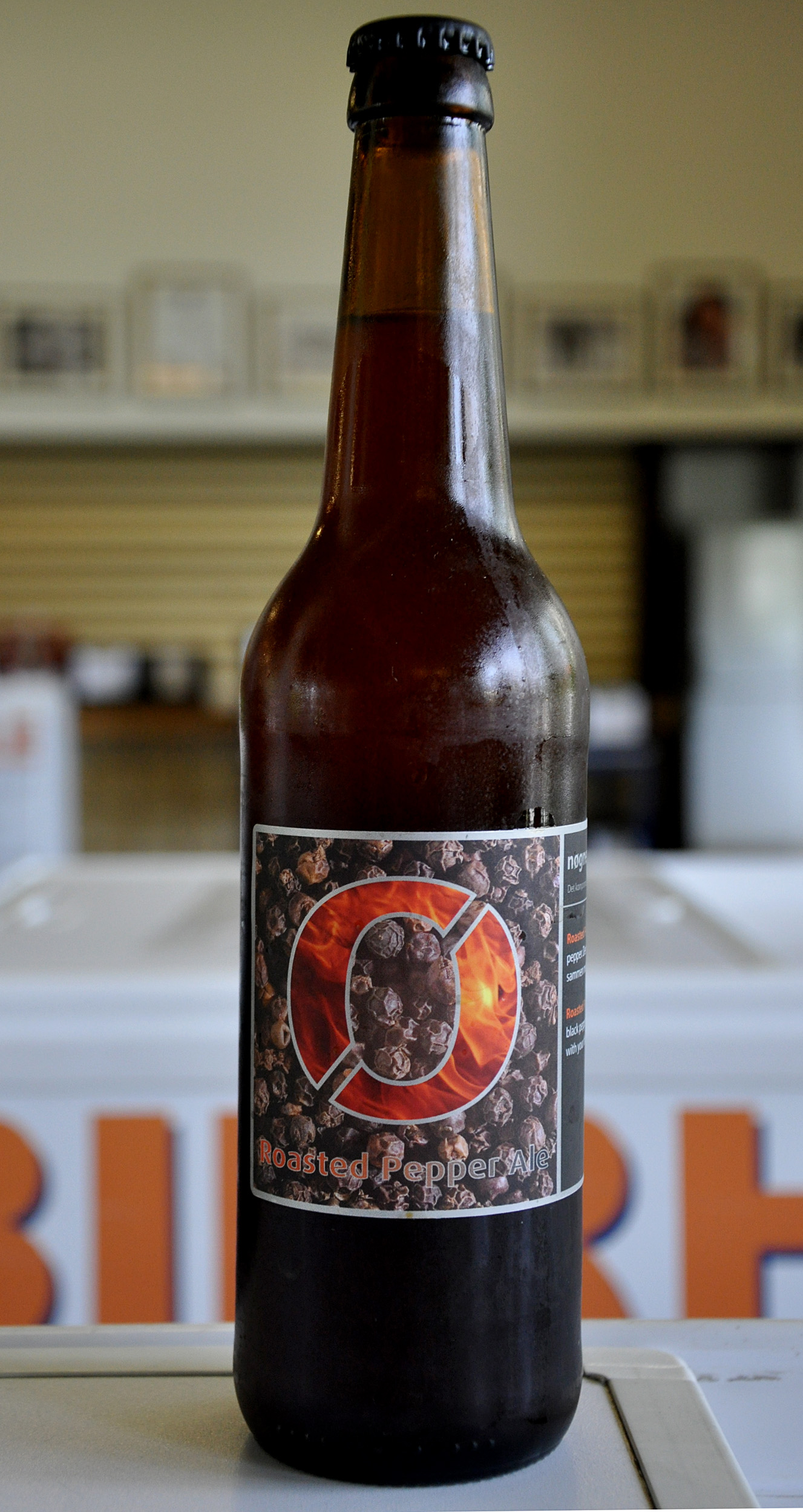
Roasted Pepper Ale

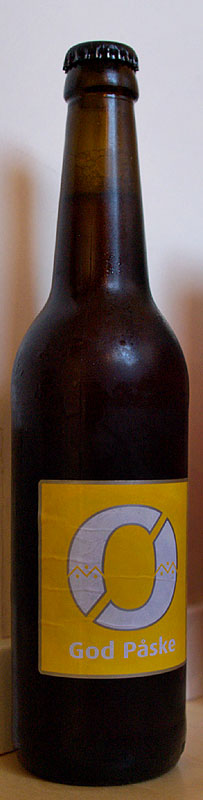
Easter beer

=== Seasonal Beers ===
- God Jul
- Julequad
- Hvit Jul
- Ekstra God Jul
- Grønn Jul
- Rød Jul
- Gul Jul

=== Retired Beers ===
- Dark Horizon 1st edition (launched 2007) - Retired
- Dark Horizon 2nd edition (launched 2008) - Retired
- Dark Horizon 3rd edition (launched 2010) - Retired
- Dark Horizon 4th edition (launched 2013) - Retired
- Dark Horizon 5th edition (launched 2017) - Retired
- Red Horizon 1st edition (launched 2010) - Retired
- Red Horizon 2nd edition (launched 2013) - Retired
- Red Horizon 3rd edition (launched 2013) - Retired
- Sweet Horizon edition (launched 2010) - Retired
- Special Holiday Ale (2009) - Retired
- Julesnadder - Retired
- Julequad 2016 - Retired
- Julequad 2017 - Retired
- Winter Ale (God Jul) - Retired
- Julenatt (2004–2006) - Retired
- Peculiar Yule (Underlig Jul) - Retired
- God Påske - Retired
- Trippel (2003–2004) - Retired
- Weiss (2003) - Retired
- Beyond the Pale Ale (2006) - Retired
- Kos på Groos (2008) - Retired
- Le Vanilla Framboise Porter - Retired
- Tangerine Dream (2008) - Retired
- Tyttebær - Retired
- Ut På Tur (2008) - Retired
- Weiss (2003) - Retired
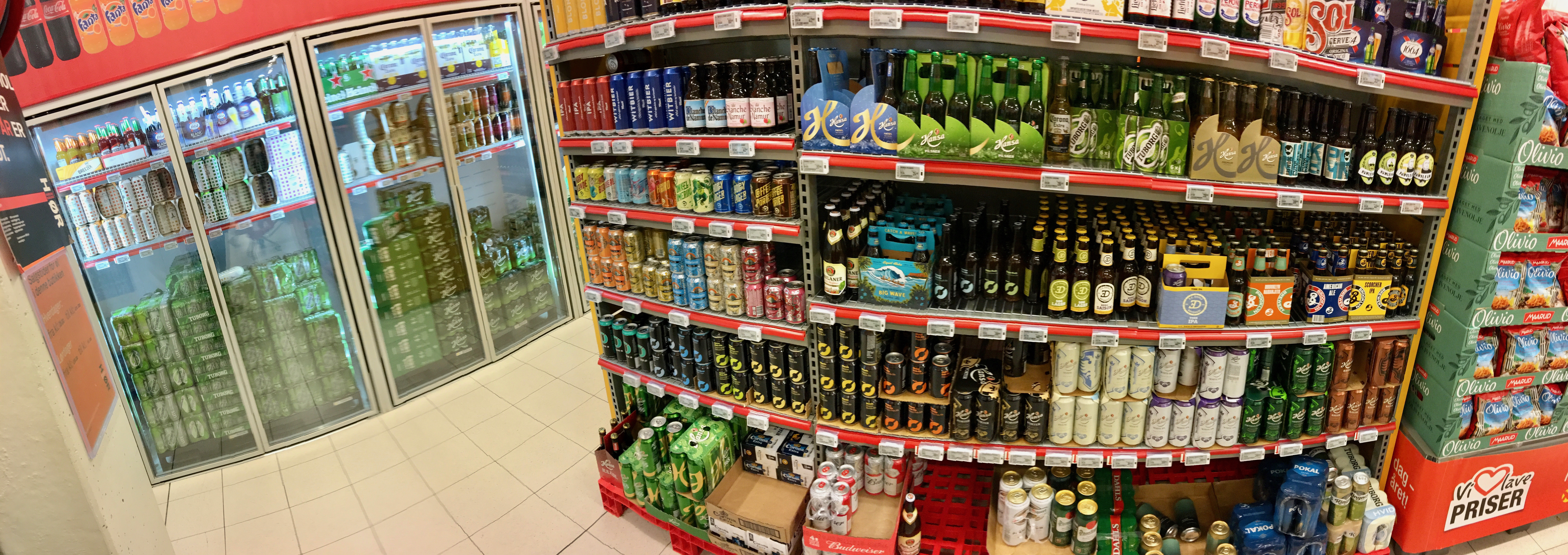
Beer from Nøgne Ø

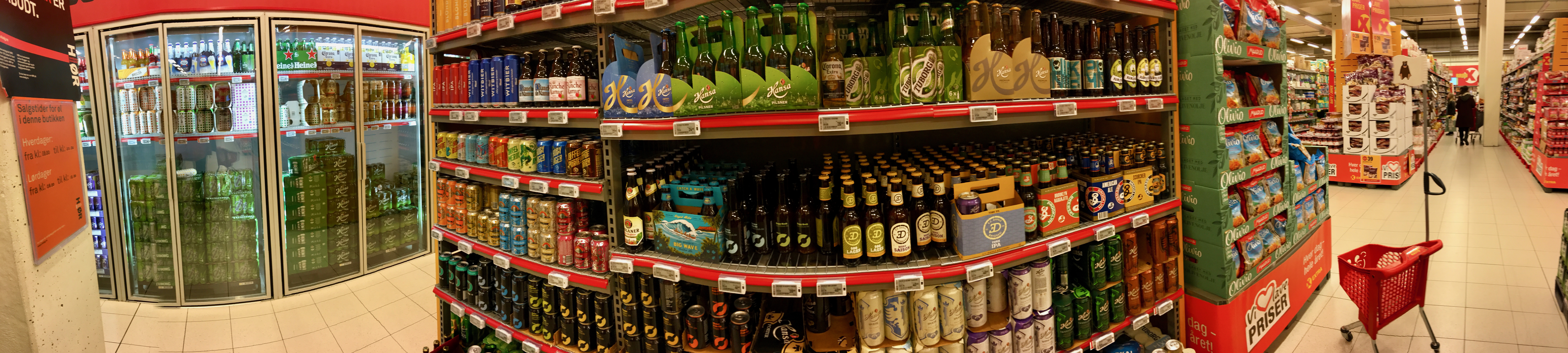
Beer from Nøgne Ø

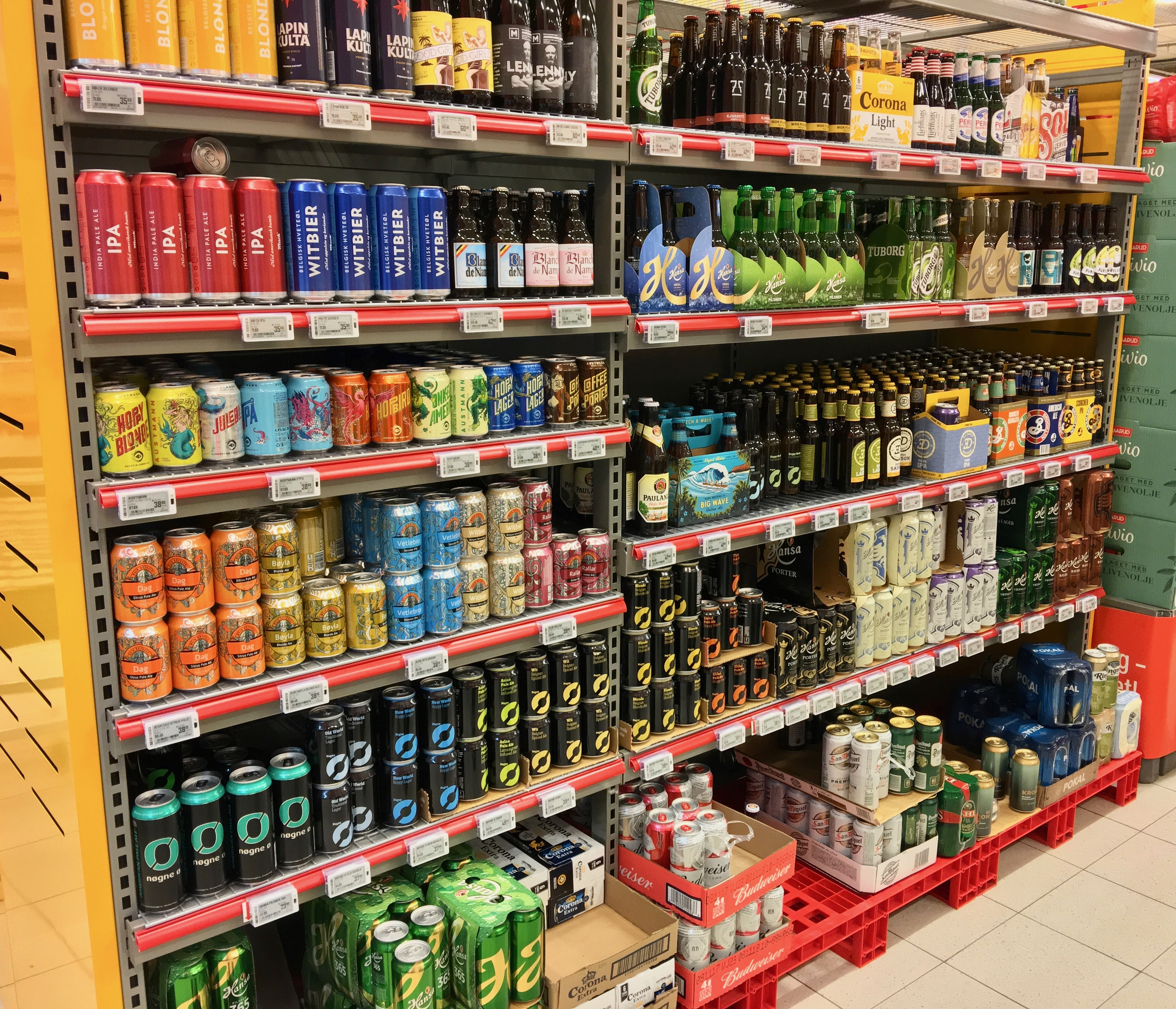
Beer from Nøgne Ø

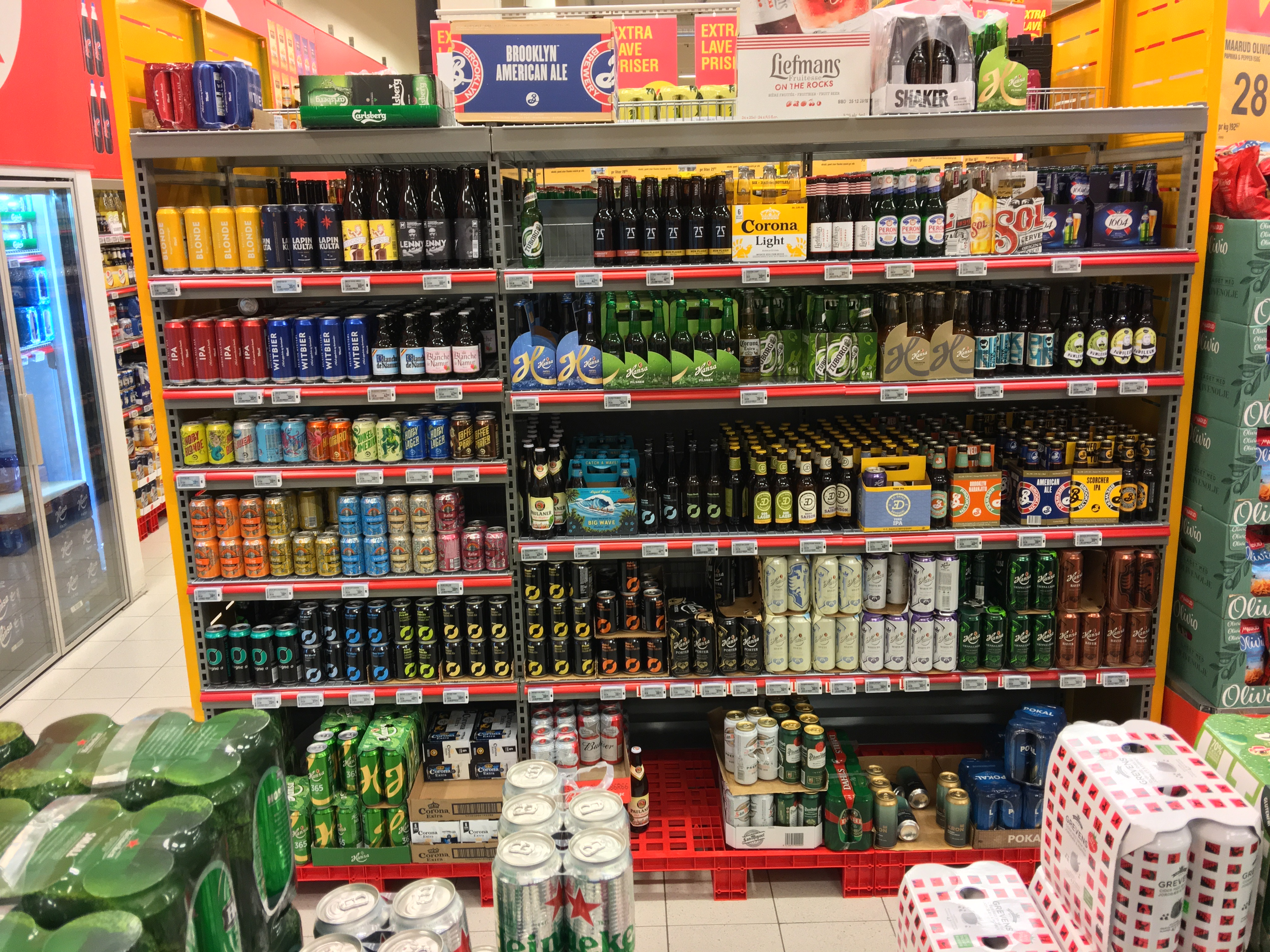
Beer from Nøgne Ø

== Other information ==
- Nøgne Ø also produced sake, as the first sake brewery in Europe. Sake production was stopped in March 2018.
- Nøgne Ø imports Weihenstephaner to Norway.
