= Beer in Norway =

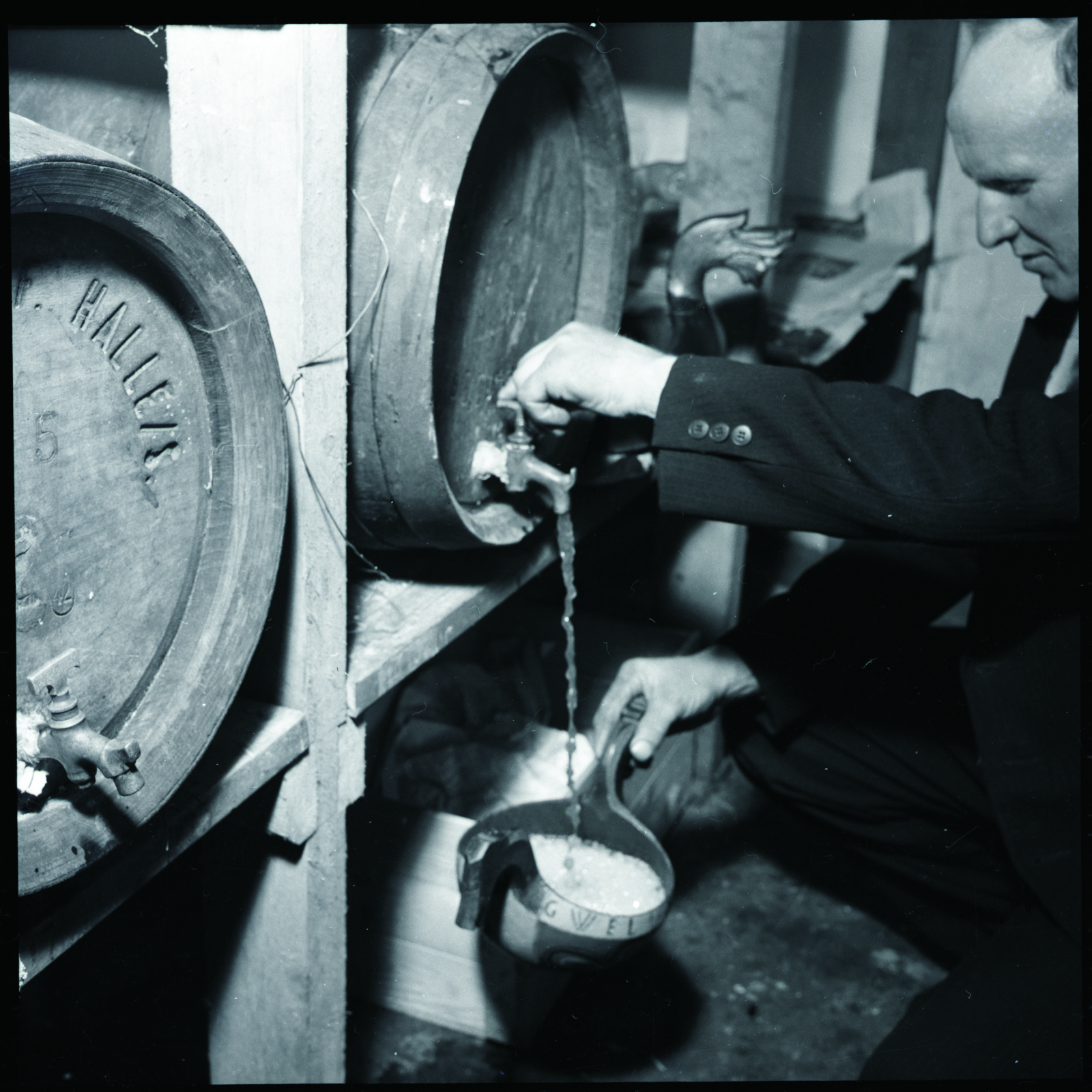
There is a wedding in Hardanger and local farmhouse ale is filled in a traditional drinking bowl. Photo:National Archives of Norway, 1954

Beer in Norway has a long history, stretching back more than a millennium. Until some 200 years ago, most farms where it was possible to grow grain south of the Arctic Circle brewed their own beer. From the early 20th century brewing was industrialized and home brewing was restricted. Significant consolidation in the brewing sector reduced the number of major breweries to just a handful. With the exception of the farmhouse ales, most beer styles brewed in Norway trace their ancestry to central Europe.

== Market ==
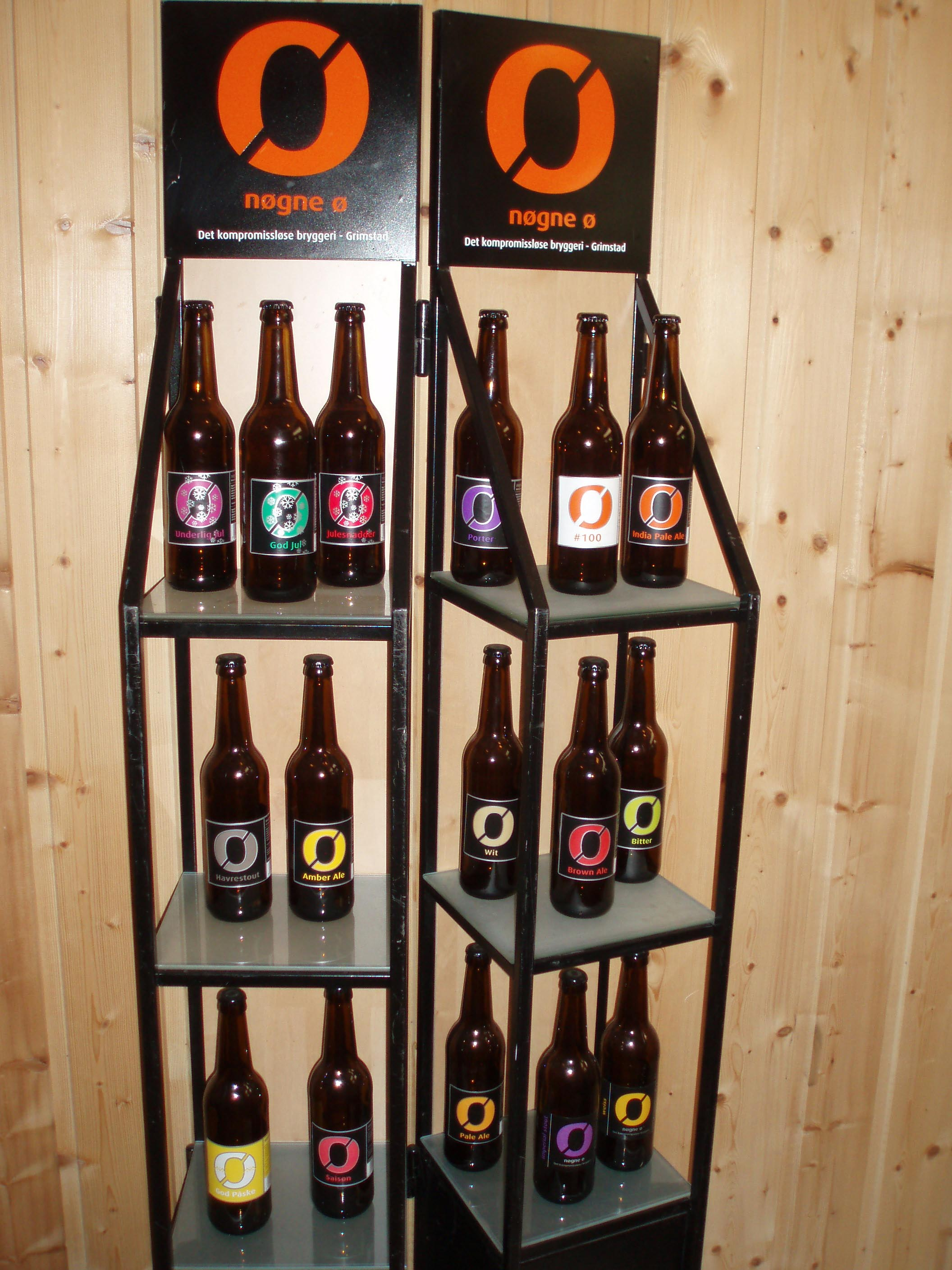
Beers from Nøgne Ø Brewery

The Norwegian beer market is dominated by two large brewers: The major Carlsberg-Ringnes based in Oslo and Copenhagen, Denmark, and the smaller Hansa Borg Bryggerier, based in Bergen and Sarpsborg. Each produce beer branded in a variety of traditional Norwegian beer brands, as well as foreign brands bottled on licence. This system is a result of the large-scale consolidation of Norwegian breweries that has taken place over the last 50 years.

Brewing has a long history in Norway, harking back to the pre-Christian era, when beer was a central element in all religious and social gatherings of any importance. The farmers brewed from their own grain, and most larger farms had a separate building used for drying both grain and malts. Home brewing in Norway is common, and divided in two separate traditions. On the one hand the, mostly city-based, modern home brewing of styles familiar from the rest of the world. On the other, in remote rural regions, farmhouse brewers brewing the same styles their parents and grandparents brewed. These are styles that don't exist elsewhere.

As with most countries in Europe and America, the most popular style of beer in Norway is pilsner-style pale lager. According to the Norwegian brewers' association, most beer brewed in Norway is pale lager. Until recently, this was the only style of beer to be had, except at Christmas time, when Christmas beers become available. These are dark malt beers traditionally brewed for the holiday season. Today, the craft beer market has continued to develop in Norway offering a number of different styles; including the popularization of kveik yeast for both traditional and modern beers.

Due to government restrictions, beers above 4.75% ABV are only available from licensed premises or from the state-run Vinmonopolet ("wine monopoly") liquor stores. This has resulted in some foreign breweries lowering the alcohol percentages in their beer in order to make them legal for supermarket retail.

Norway has a "pay to play" market meaning the breweries must pay to get their beers on tap in most pubs, restaurants and nightclubs. The brewery must provide the bar with all the systems required for pulling beer, including tanks, taps, and glasses. In place of the tap selection, bars often carry a number of bottled beers. However, these usually carry a much higher price tag. The only exception is when the bar themselves own their own draft system and equipment. This has created a slow growth of small local breweries and limited the consumers options to which beers they can access at their local bars and restaurants.

== Styles ==
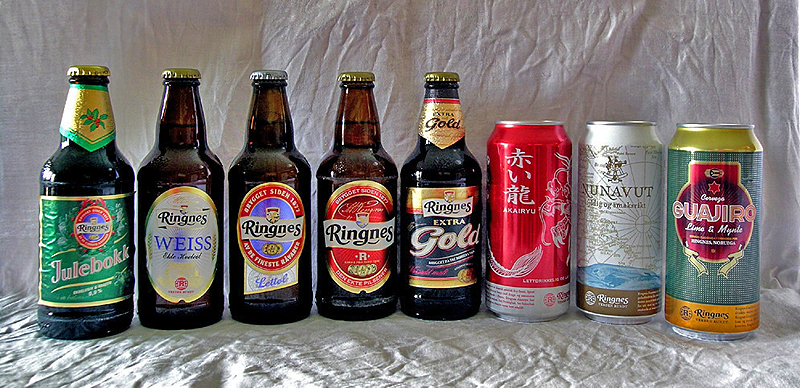
Carlsberg Norwegian market brand sample

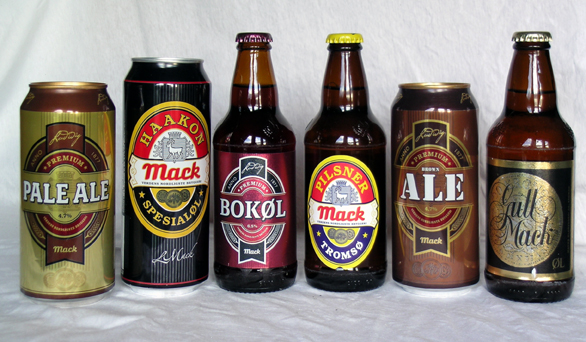
Mack market brand sample

Styles of beer that are typical of Norwegian commercial brewing are:

Pilsner - the pale lager style which originated in the Czech city of Plzeň. This is the dominant beer type with almost 92% of the market share. The weaker (below 4.75% abv.) types are the most common, but most breweries also brew stronger varieties (similar to the Bavarian Spezial beer style) for sale through the Vinmonopol.

Bayer - a dark lager with roots in Bavaria (Bayern). The Norwegian version is often slightly sweeter than German dark lagers. Once rivaling pilsner in popularity, its market share has dropped from 20% in 1950 to 0.2% in 2004. It was the most popular industrial-brewed beer before the Second World War, but it lost its popularity due to the German occupation.

Juleøl - a dark, malted beer exclusively available at Christmas time. Traditionally this was a strong ale which was brewed at home. In modern times each brewery produces their own variety of Christmas beer, mostly a lager. Most breweries brew both weaker varieties (for sale in supermarkets) and more traditional, stronger varieties.

Bokkøl - a strong, dark style of lager, typically 6-7% ABV, with a sweet, complex flavor. It originates from Germany, where it is known as Bock bier.

In addition, Norway has a strong tradition of farmhouse brewing, which has given rise to several styles, known under the common name of "maltøl" (and more recently sometimes "gårdsøl"). Only a few commercial examples of these exist.

Heimabrygg - From the Hardanger, Voss, Sogn region. Usually dark and very strong (8-12%), mostly brewed from barley malts, with juniper and often kveik yeast. The wort is boiled, often for several hours.

Kornøl - From the Nordfjord and Sunnmøre regions. Usually pale, hazy, and 6-8%. Mostly brewed from barley malts, with juniper and kveik yeast. Traditionally the wort was not boiled, but more in recent decades some brewers have begun boiling.

Stjørdalsøl - From the Stjørdal region. Usually deep dark red and slightly hazy. Brewed from home-made heavily alder smoked barley malts. Usually fermented with bread yeast. Traditionally it was brewed with both hops and juniper, but the use of both, particularly juniper, has declined over the last few decades.

== Legislation ==
In Norway, beer is classified into four categories by ABV (alcohol by volume), labeled from A to D. The class both determine the tax level, age restrictions, where, and when it can be sold.

- Class A beer has an ABV of less than 0.7%, and is for all intents and purposes alcohol-free beer. It is not taxed more than general foodstuffs, and can be sold anywhere, any time, and be bought by anyone.
- Class B beer has an ABV between 0.7% and 2.75%, and is considered "lettøl" (light beer). It is lightly taxed, and can be sold anywhere, anytime, with an age limit of 18 years.
- Class C beer has an ABV between 2.75% and 3.75%. This category is not in common use.
- Class D beer has an ABV between 3.75% and 4.75%, and is considered standard strength. Taxation is significant, age limit is 18 years, and sales are subject to local regulation. In most parts of Norway, class D beer can be purchased from common supermarkets, but only before 20:00 on weekdays and 18:00 on Saturdays. In some parts of Norway it can only be purchased through licensed beer stores.
- Beer over 4,75% is considered sterkøl (strong beer) and is only sold through the government-controlled liquor store chain Vinmonopolet. It is taxed according to ABV level as with wines and spirits, and carries an 18-year age limit.

== Notable breweries ==
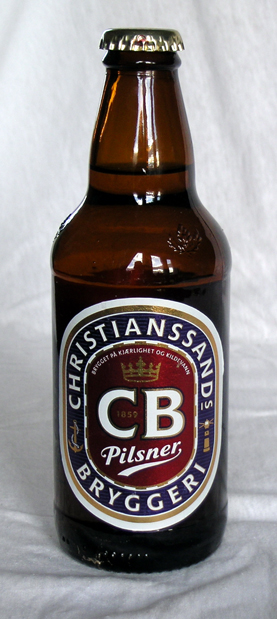
CB Pilsner brand (Hansa-Borg)

- Ringnes Bryggeri in Oslo, owned by the Danish brewery Carlsberg.
- Hansa Brewery in Bergen, owned by Hansa Borg Bryggerier.
- Aass Bryggeri in Drammen.
- Borg Bryggerier in Sarpsborg, owned by Hansa-Borg.
- Christianssands Bryggeri (CB) in Kristiansand, owned by Hansa-Borg.
- E. C. Dahls Bryggeri in Trondheim, owned by Ringnes.
- Grans Bryggeri in Sandefjord.
- Mack Bryggeri in Nordkjosbotn.

=== Craft breweries ===
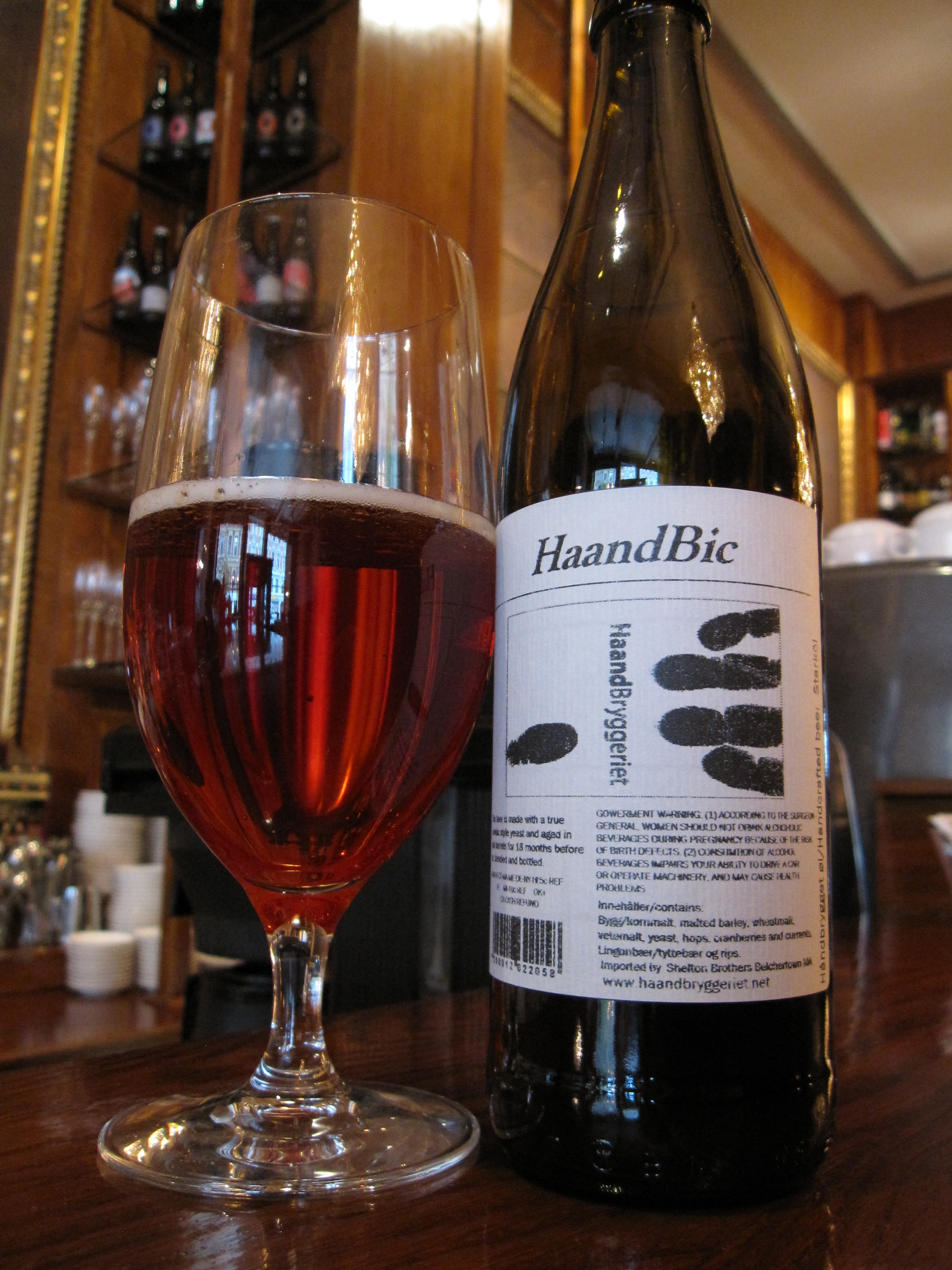
Haandbryggeriet Sour Beer

- Nøgne Ø Brewery in Grimstad, and Christianssands Bryggeri in Kristiansand.
- Austmann Bryggeri in Trondheim.
- Haandbryggeriet Brewery in Drammen.
- Kinn Bryggeri in Florø.
- Lervig Aktiebryggeri in Stavanger.
- Sagene Bryggeri in Oslo.
- Svalbard Bryggeri in Longyearbyen.
- Ægir Bryggeri in Flåm.

== Microbreweries and brew pubs ==
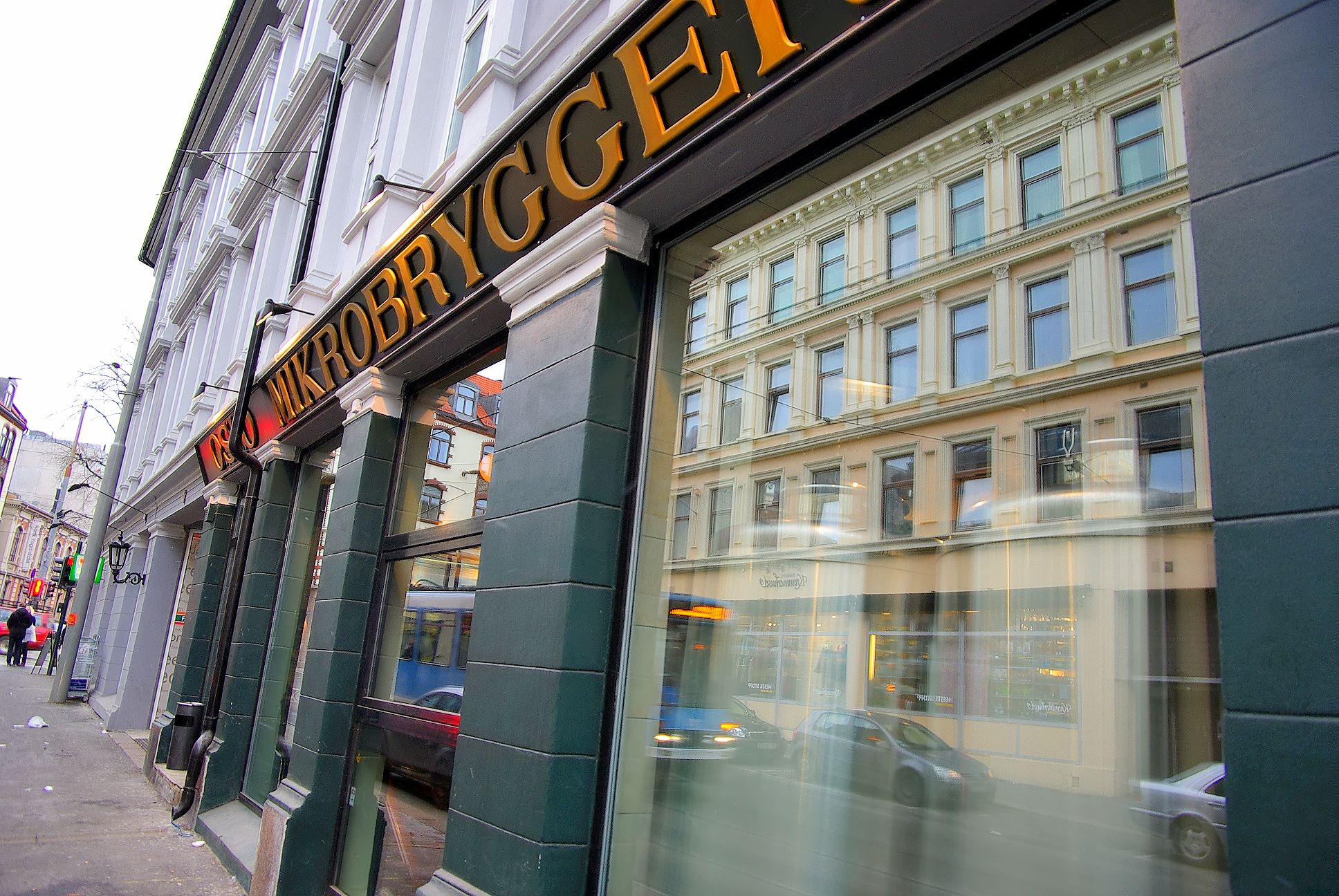
Oslo Mikrobryggeri is a microbrewery and pub in central Oslo

Norway started late with microbreweries. There are over a hundred microbreweries in Norway, especially in the major cities. Brew pubs sell beers from their own microbreweries.

== Craft beer ==
There are an increasing number of microbreweries producing variations of craft beer. Some craft beers have an alcohol content more than 4.7%, and must be sold in Norway only through Vinmonopolet.

Norwegian craft beers are for the most part based on foreign styles, but in recent years beers based on the local farmhouse brewing tradition have come onto the market. Although the volume of craft beer is significantly lower than beer from the larger other parts of the brewery industry, about 25% of the employees of the Norwegian brewery industry works with craft beer brewing.

An example of the revival of old brewing is that many current Norwegian brewers brew traditional and modern beer types using the Norwegian yeast kveik.

== See also ==
- Beer and breweries by region
- Liste over norske bryggerier (Norwegian list article of breweries in Norway)

== Literature ==
- Mortensen, Hylje and Johnsen, Vidar: Norsk øl. Tun forlag 2009. (in Norwegian) ISBN 978-82-529-3286-7
- Jørgensen, Gustav: Skummende lidenskap - fem stabeiser og deres øl. Bibere forlag 2013 (in Norwegian) ISBN 9788299942201
- Almås Kvig, Jørn Idar: Ølboka. Front Forlag 2014 (in Norwegian) ISBN 978-82-826-0329-4
- Smith-Gahrsen, Gahr; Hatland, Hugo Ivan and Ekeland, Skjalg: Den norske ølrevolusjonen. Kagge Forlag 2014 (in Norwegian) ISBN 9788248915249
- Solem, Knut Albert: Norsk øl- og bryggeriguide. Vega Forlag, Oslo, 2016 (in Norwegian) ISBN 978-82-8211-459-2
- Almås Kvig, Jørn Idar: Den norske ølboka - en guide til norske øl og bryggerier. Goliat Forlag AS, 2016 (in Norwegian) ISBN 9788293430155
- Almås Kvig, Jørn Idar: Sommerøl - en guide til sommerens øl. Goliat Forlag AS, 2016 (in Norwegian) ISBN 9788293430025
- Almås Kvig, Jørn Idar: Den store ølboka - en guide til skandinavisk øl og bryggerier, Goliat Forlag AS, 2017 (in Norwegian) ISBN 9788293430544
