= Smoked beer =

Smoked malt beer

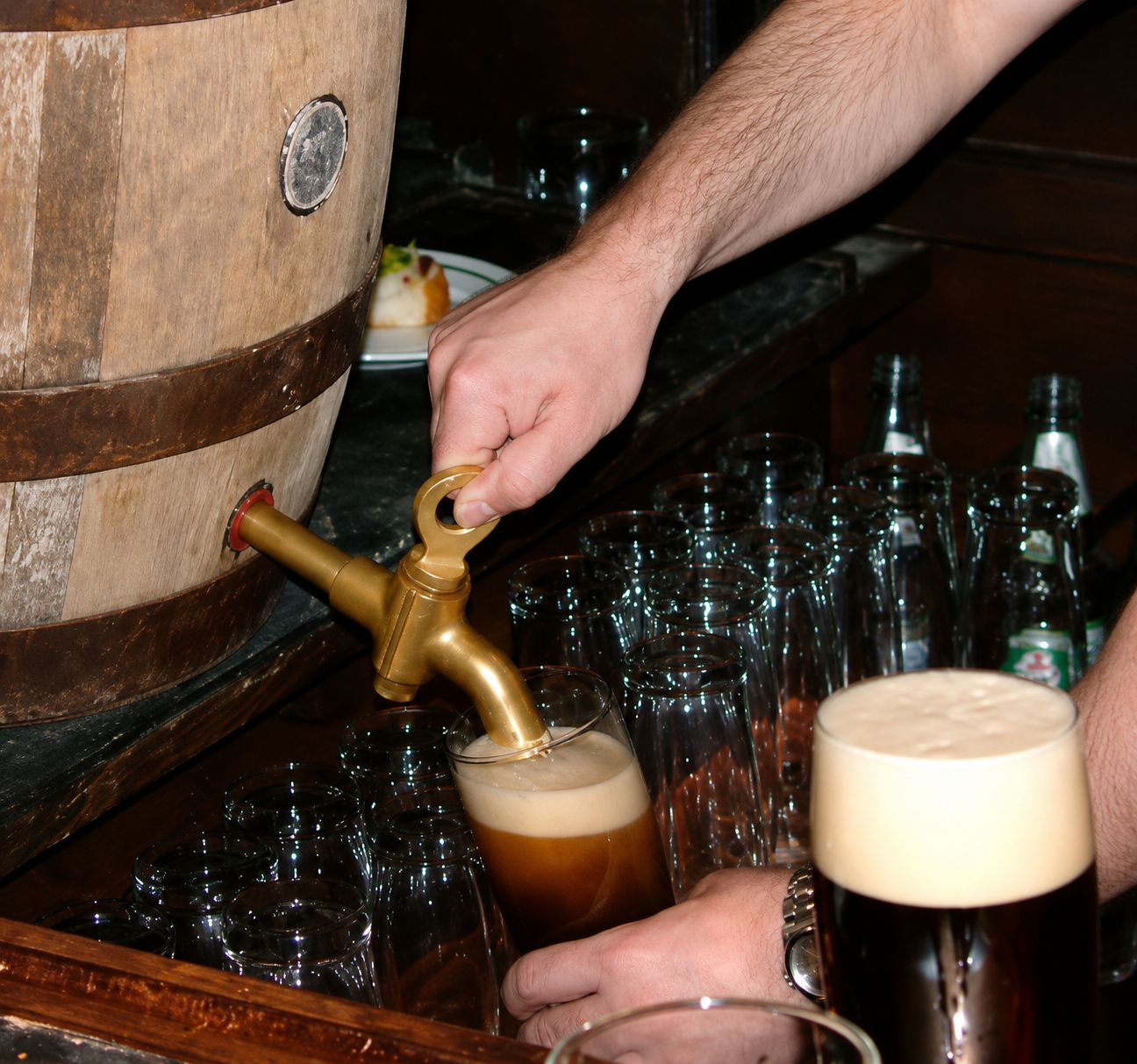
Schlenkerla Rauchbier from the cask, Bamberg

Smoked beer (German: Rauchbier) is a type of beer with a distinctive smoke flavour imparted by using malted barley dried over an open flame.

== History ==
Drying malt over an open flame in a smoke kiln may impart a smoky character to the malt. This character may carry over to beers brewed with the smoked malt. Before the modern era, drying malted barley in direct sunlight was used in addition to drying over flames. Even though hot air kiln drying of malt, using indirect heat, did not enter into widespread usage until the industrial era, the method was known as early as the first century BC. Also, there have been various methods over the years of preparing cereal grains for brewing, including making beer from bread, so smoked beer was not universal.

Beginning in the 18th century, hot air kiln drying of malt became progressively more common and, by the mid-19th century, had become the near-universal method for drying malted grain. Since the hot air kiln method prevents any smoke from coming into contact with wet malt, a smoky flavour is not imparted to the grain, nor to the subsequent beer. As a result, smoke flavour in beer became less and less common, and eventually disappeared almost entirely from the brewing world.

== Bamberg Rauchbier ==
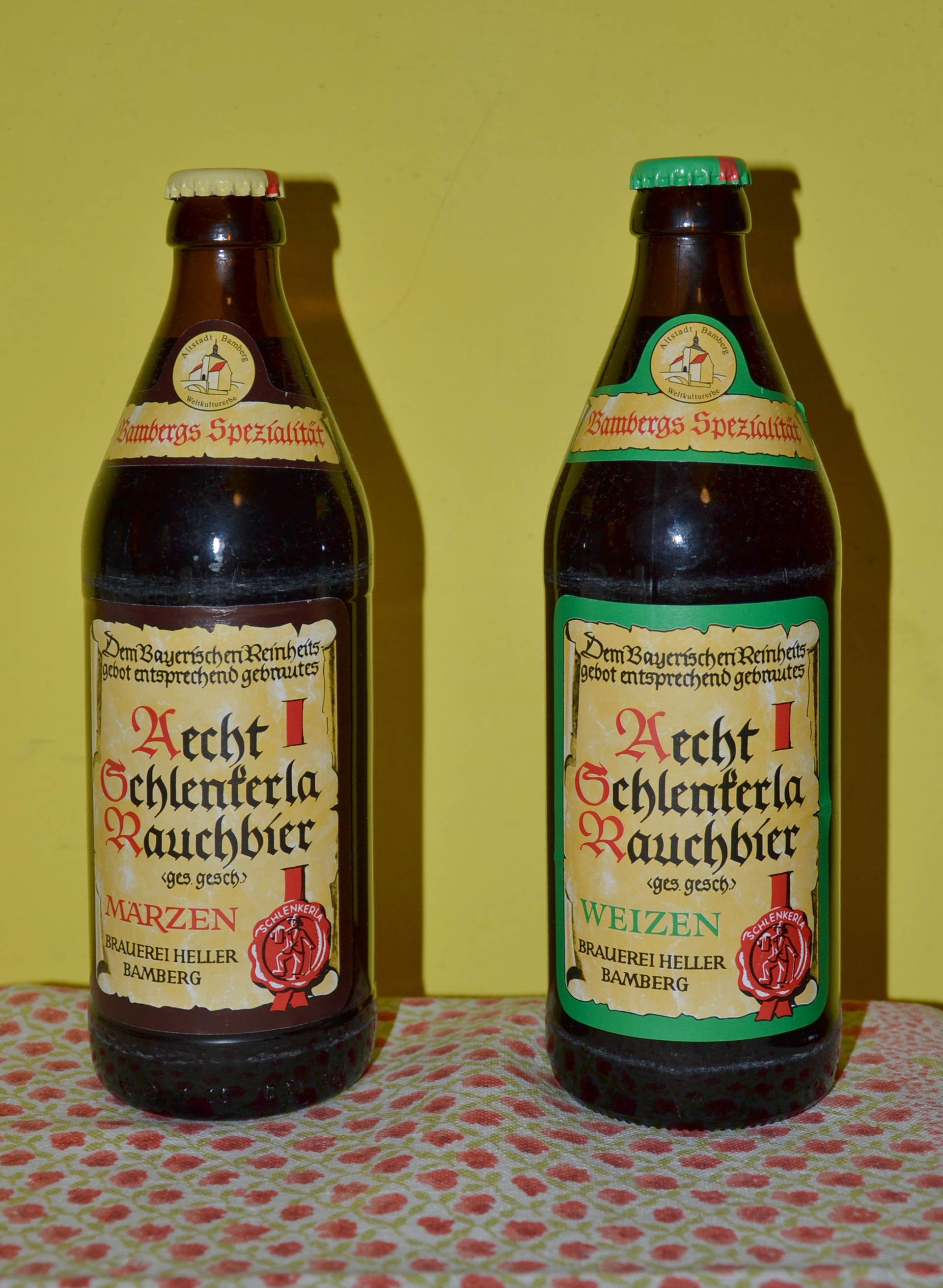
Bamberg smoked beers

Certain breweries maintained the smoked beer tradition by continuing to use malt which had been dried over open flames. The malt is dried over fires made from beechwood logs. The malt and fermenting beer are stored under the pub and brewery in a part of the catacombs of Bamberg, a maze of tunnels under the city built from the 11th century onward, which have a very stable moisture and temperature. In former times, ice was used to cool the fermenting beer tank room, the Lagerkeller. This ice was locally harvested above ground in the winter, although when the winter was too mild, ice was imported from as far away as Finland or Sweden. The beer is then filtered to clarify it and remove yeast remnants, and put into oaken vats. Two brewpubs in Bamberg, Germany, Schlenkerla and Spezial, have continued this type of smoked beer production for more than a century. Several varieties of Rauchbier ("smoked beer" in German) are produced by these companies. Both are still in operation today, alongside seven other breweries in the same town. Since the rauchbier tradition was continuously preserved in Bamberg, the beer style is now marketed as Bamberg Rauchbier.

Due to the popularity of craft beer in recent years, smoke-flavoured industrially-produced malts became available, and so the style has been attempted worldwide, including in its heartland of Franconia and Bamberg. Schlenkerla and Spezial, however, use a traditional, elaborate way of smoke malting. In 2017 Slow Food included these two Rauchbiere in their Ark of Taste.

The Brewers Association distinguishes three variations of Bamberg-style Rauchbier: Helles, Märzen, and Bock. Each is brewed according to the underlying style, but with smoked malts replacing some or all of the mash bill.

== Grodziskie ==
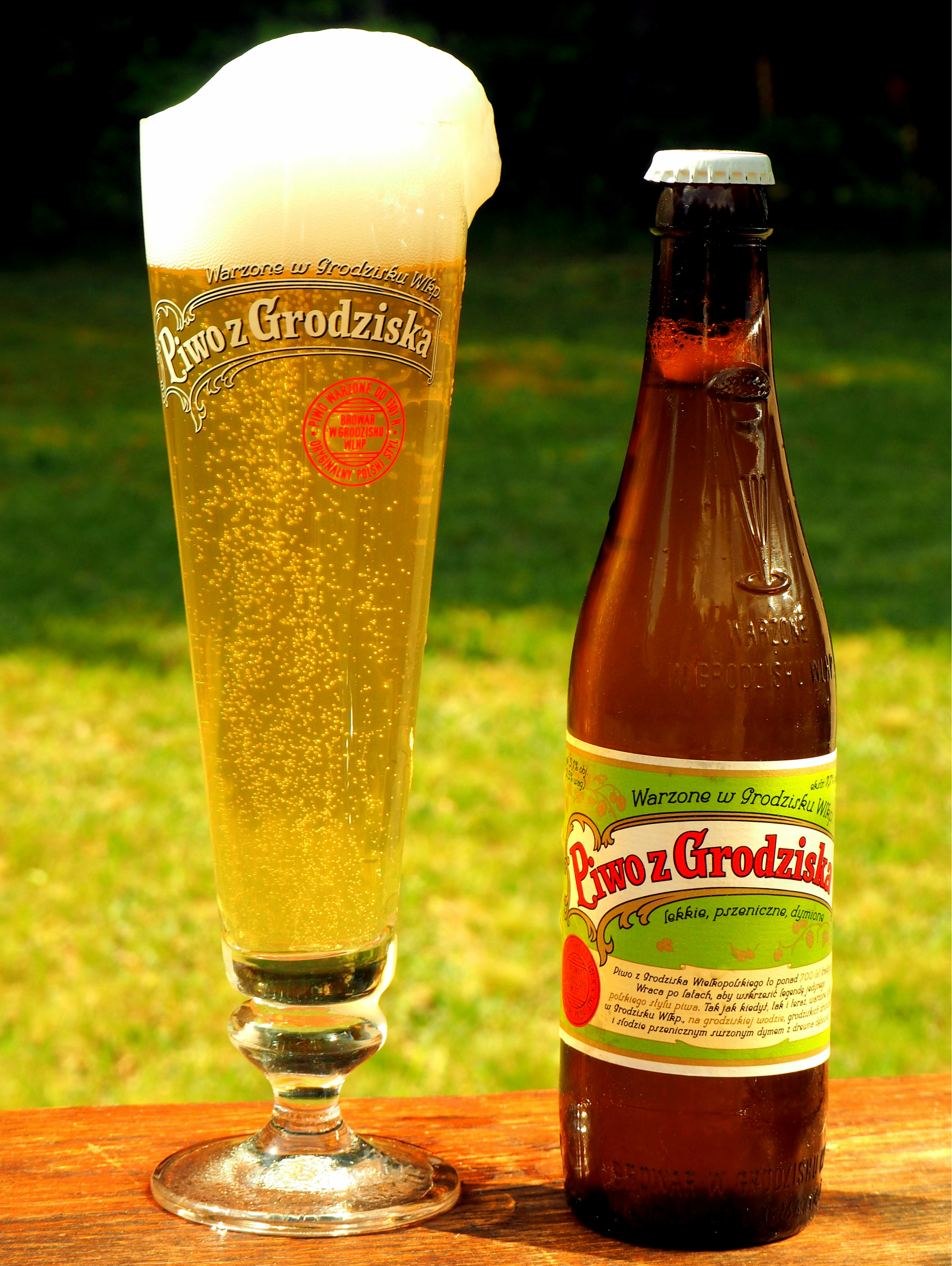
Grodziskie beer

Grodziskie, or Grätzer, is a smoked beer from Poland, made from wheat and highly carbonated, which saw a period of no production in the late 1990s.

Grodziskie is 2.7–3.7% alcohol by volume, with little to no hop flavour or aroma, and medium-low to medium bitterness. The typical colour is straw to gold.

== Smoked beers outside Germany and Poland ==
- In Australia, the Feral Brewing Company and Nail Brewing, both in Western Australia, make a smoked porter. In addition Gulf Brewery, in South Australia, make a Smoke Stack rauchbier.
- In Belgium, the Dupont Brewery produces Triomfbier Vooruit, a saison produced with smoked malt.
- In Brazil, Eisenbahn produces a smoked beer called Eisenbahn Rauchbier, using malts imported from Bamberg.
- In Bulgaria, Britos produces "Опушена" with "malted barley smoked over an open flame".
- In Canada, Les Trois Mousquetaires makes a smoked beer, and Half Pints Brewing Company the seasonal Smoktoberfest. Also, Church-Key brewing of Campbellford, Ontario produces a peat smoked Scotch ale called Holy Smoke. Cameron's brewing in Oakville, Ontario produces Bamburg Castle smoked ale. Moosehead Breweries Small Batch label now produces a smoked lager using magnum hops. Trailway Brewing Co. in Fredericton has been making a Beechwood smoked Märzen called Lagerfeuer which is German for campfire.
- In Chile, Cervecería La Montaña produces Yuta, a smoked Munich dunkel (5.6% abv) with traditional German ingredients, although it does not follow the classic base beer styles from Bamberg's Rauchbiere.
- In Italy, Birrificio Lambrate make two smoked stout beers, the draught or bottled Ghisa (5% ABV) and the bottled Imperial Ghisa (8.5%).
- In Lithuania, Dundulis brewery produces a smoked beer called Juodvarnių.
- In the Netherlands, Emelisse produces a traditional German-style smoked beer, as well as a smoked porter and a peated Russian imperial stout. Brouwerij De Molen has several different smoked beers, such as Bloed, Zweet & Tranen and Rook & Vuur. Othmar also produces a traditional smoked beer, named Rauchbier.
- In Norway, Haandbryggeriet produces a smoked, juniper-flavoured beer called Norwegian Wood.
- In the United Kingdom, Meantime Brewery produced Winter Time, a smoked old ale, and Kelham Island Brewery in Sheffield made Brooklyn Smoked Porter in association with Brooklyn Brewery. Adnams bottles its Smoked Ruby (4.7% ABV) using cherry wood and has brewed a similar, limited edition, 1659 Smoked Ruby Ale. Beavertown brews a smoked porter called Smog Rocket.
- In the United States, the Alaskan Brewing Company, Great Basin Brewing Company, New Glarus Brewing Company, Revolution Brewing, Surly Brewing Company, and Samuel Adams make and distribute smoked beers influenced by the Rauchbier of Bamberg.
- In Ireland, Black Donkey Brewing seasonally brews "Bog Fire", a wild ale, using a portion of locally turf (peat) smoked malt, and fermented with a wild local yeast. The 2023 release had additionally been aged in ex-Irish-whiskey barrels for three years.
- In Iceland, Ölvisholt produces a smoked imperial stout since the year 2009 called Lava (9,4%).

== See also ==
- Grätzer
- List of beer styles
- List of smoked foods
