= Christianssands Bryggeri =

Norwegian brewery

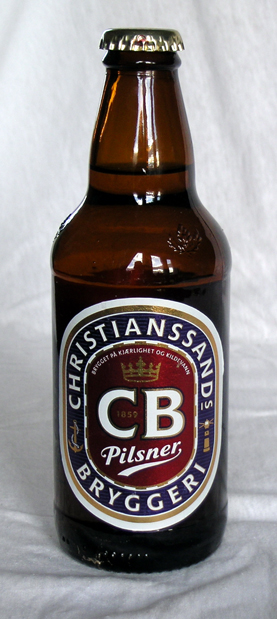
CB's traditional Pilsener.

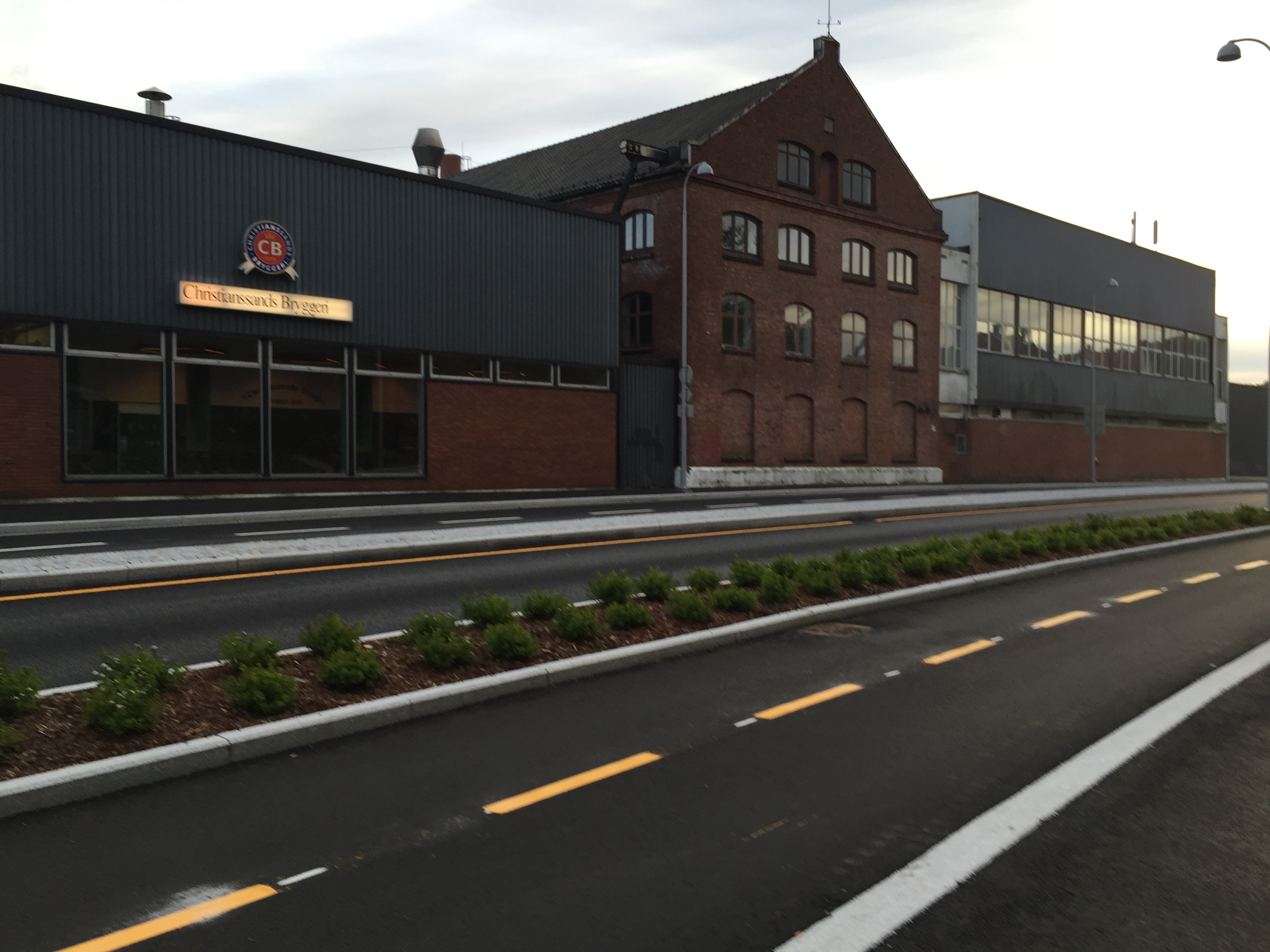
Christianssands Bryggeri

Christianssands Bryggeri (or CB, Kristiansand's Brewery) was a Norwegian brewery centred in Kristiansand. Together with Hansa Bryggeri in Bergen and Borg Bryggerier in Sarpsborg it makes up Hansa Borg Bryggerier AS, which is the second largest group of breweries in Norway, next to Ringnes (which is owned by Carlsberg). It was closed in 2022, production moved to Sarpsborg CB was created in 1856 by consul Ole Jacob Mørch. In 1859 he had to sell the brewery, together with the rest of his enterprises, as a consequence of hard times following the Crimean War. The brewery was sold to consul Jørgen Christiansen, who finished building the brewery and started production in the autumn of 1859. Kristiansand had about 11,000 inhabitants at this time and the brewery became a successful business.

The Christiansen family led the enterprise for five generations until 1964. After this the shares were sold to Tou Brewery in Stavanger. Since then CB has had several owners: a group of investors called Sørlandvekst, the Swedish brewery Spendrups, and since 1999 Hansa Borg Bryggerier AS.

All CB products are brewed with Artesian water from the source of Christian IV. Allegedly this source was found in 1932, in an extraordinarily dry summer, when the company's plumber used a divining rod. On 32 meters' depth he found crystal-clear and 100% pure water, which holds a stable temperature of 9–10 degrees Celsius, both in summer and in winter.

The beer has a fan-club, called "CB-ølets venner" (friends of the CB beer), with more than 10,000 life-term members. The brewery is also known for its julebrus, or Christmas soda, which has a golden brown colour, and a taste reminiscent of Champagne.
