= AASS =

AASS or Aass may refer to:

- Alpha-aminoadipic semialdehyde synthase
- American Anti-Slavery Society, abolitionist society in existence from 1833 to 1870
- Aass Brewery, Norway's oldest active brewery
- Th. Valentin Aass (1887–1961), Norwegian sailor and civil servant
- Acta Sanctorum, a multi-volume work of critical hagiography

== See also ==
- Aas (disambiguation)
