= Kinn =

Kinn or KINN may refer to:

== Places ==
=== Norway ===
- Kinn Municipality, a municipality in Vestland county (established on 1 Jan 2020)
- Kinn Municipality (1838–1964), a former municipality in the old Sogn og Fjordane county
- Kinn (island), an island in Kinn Municipality in Vestland county
- Kinn Church, a church in Kinn Municipality in Vestland county
- Kinn Church (Innlandet), a church in Nordre Land Municipality in Innlandet county

== People ==
- Eugene Kinn Choy, Chinese-American architect
- Gustav Kinn (1895–1978), Swedish long-distance runner
- Maurice Kinn (1924–2000), British music journalist and publisher
- Thomas Kinn (born 1999), Norwegian professional footballer
- Kinn Hamilton McIntosh, English novelist known as Catherine Aird

== Other ==
- KINN, an American radio station
- Kinn Bryggeri, a brewery in the town of Florø, Norway
- HNoMS Kinn, formerly the German submarine U-1202
