= Schlenkerla =

Pub in Bamberg, Germany

HellerBräu Trum KG
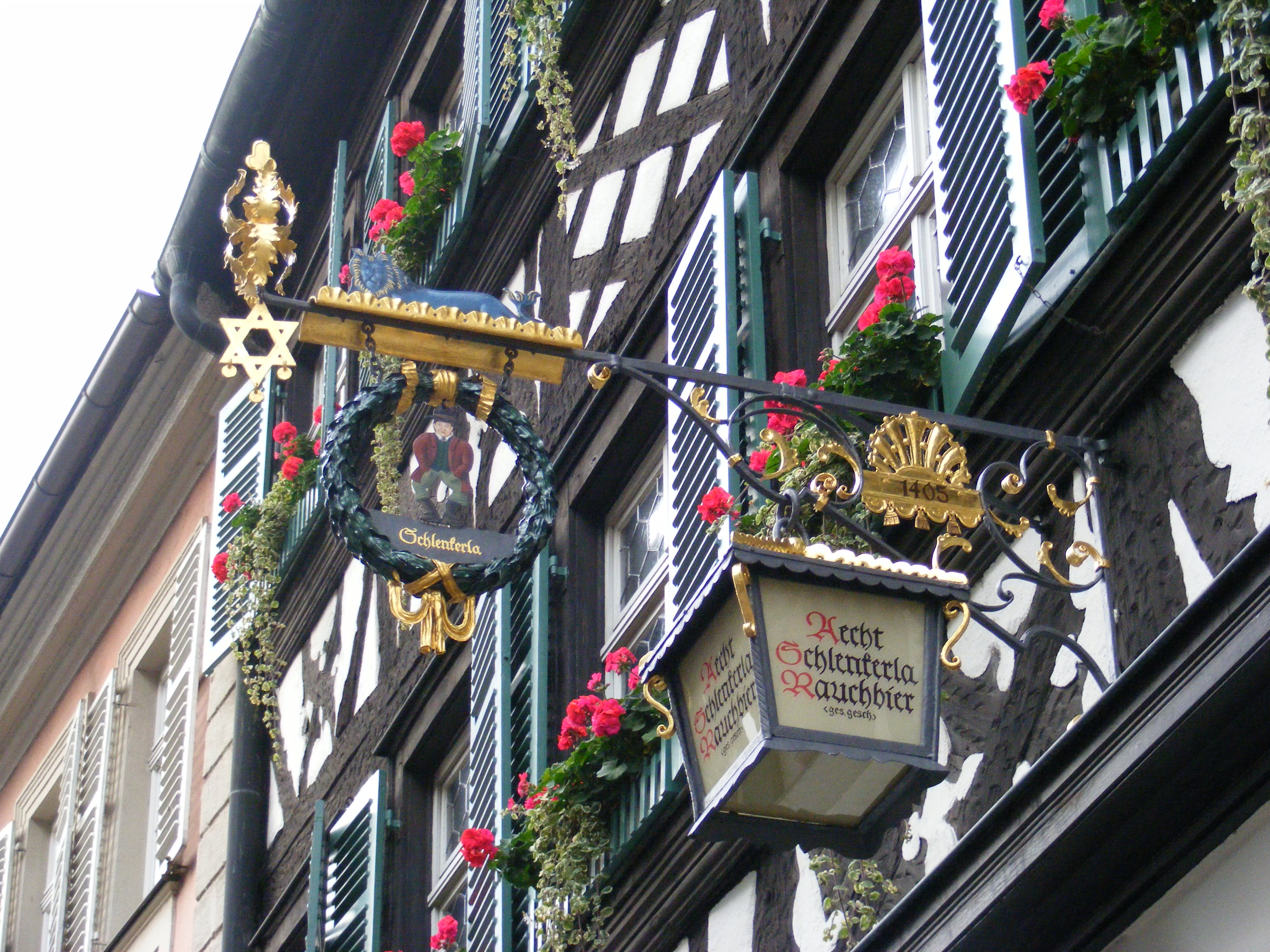
- Interactive map of HellerBräu Trum KG
- Location: Bamberg, Germany
- Coordinates: 49°53′30″N 10°53′05″E
- Opened: 1405
- Website: www.schlenkerla.de

Active beers
Name	Type
Aecht Schlenkerla Rauchbier	Rauchbier
Aecht Schlenkerla Rauchbier Märzen	Märzen Rauchbier
Helles Schlenkerla Lager	Lager Rauchbier
Schlenkerla Rauchweizen	Weizen Rauchbier

Seasonal beers
Name	Type
Aecht Schlenkerla Eiche	Christmas Doppelbock
Aecht Schlenkerla Fastenbier	Unfiltered Rauchbier
Aecht Schlenkerla Kräusen
Aecht Schlenkerla Rauchbier Urbock	Bock-Rauchbier

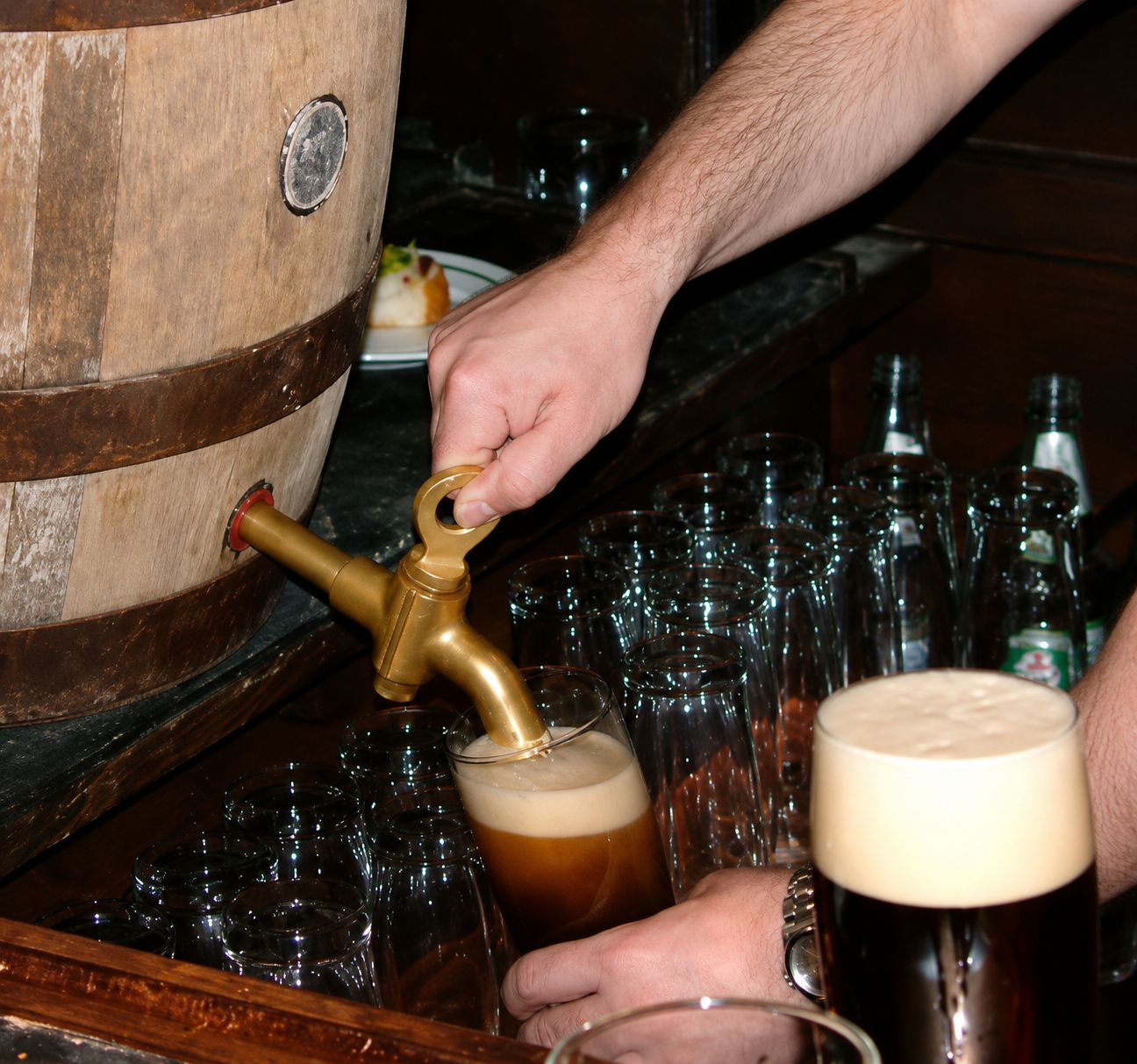
Schlenkerla Rauchbier being tapped straight from the cask (2003)

Schlenkerla is a historic brewpub in Bamberg, Franconia, Germany, renowned for its smoked Aecht Schlenkerla Rauchbier.

== Beers ==
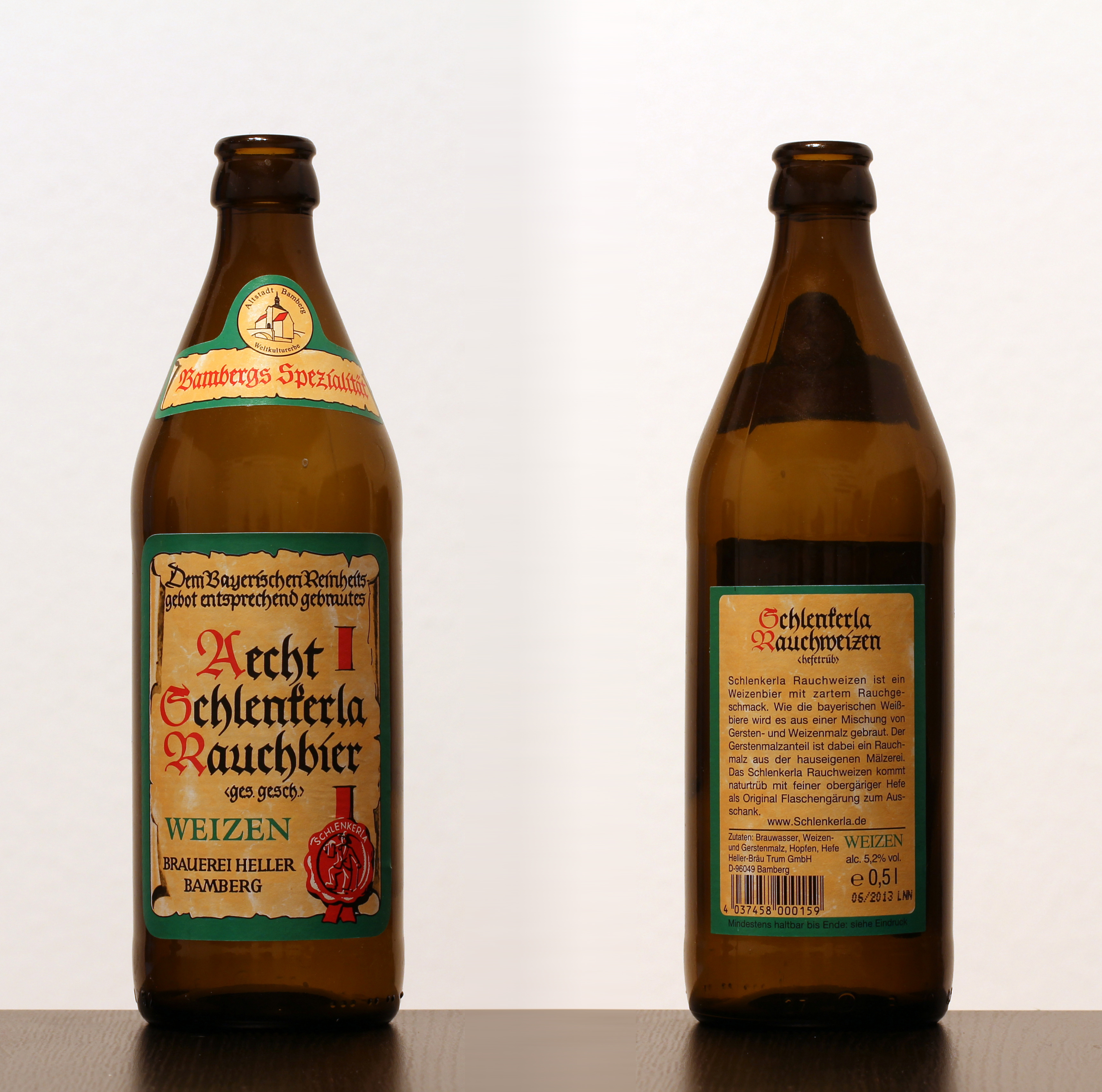
Aecht Schlenkerla Rauchbier Weizen

Aecht Schlenkerla is recognized for making traditional Rauchbier (smoked beer) including urbock, märzen, weizen, oak doppelbock, lentbeer (Fastenbier), a Helles Marzen blend (Krausen), Helles (filtered and unfiltered) and Hansla (low alcohol). The brewery releases vintages of the Doppelbock and Urbock that have been aged in rock cellars. A schnapps made from Rauchbier is also available in Schlenkerla's pub and restaurant.

The brewery's restaurant has been ranked among the top places in the world to have a beer by All About Beer magazine.

== The pub ==
The brewery has been in operation since 1405, when it was a pub known as Zum Blauen Löwen ("At the Blue Lion"). Schlenkerla tavern features a Gothic ceiling known as the Dominikanerklause. It is located in the old town section of Bamberg, a UNESCO World Heritage site tucked away in the Franconia section of northern Bavaria. Each year the brewery celebrates "Smokebeer Preservation Day" on July 23. On that day in 1635 the first smoke free malt drying machine was patented. Soon most beers became smoke-free and Rauchbier became rare. Only a small number of Bamberg breweries continued the use of traditional fire kiln malt drying, preserving the style. The style is now made by a limited number of breweries around the world and is recognized at the Great American Beer Festival with a Smoke Beer category with six subcategories.

== Name ==
Schlenkerla roughly translates as "Dangling". Schlenkern is a German verb meaning to swing or to dangle (literally "to slink"). The -la suffix is typical of the East Franconian dialect. The name reportedly comes from a brewer with a hobbling gait whose image can be seen on the Aecht Schlenkerla Rauchbier bottle. The brewery's legal name is HellerBräu Trum KG, after the Trum family that has owned and run it for six generations.

== See also ==
- List of smoked foods
