= Austmann Bryggeri =

Norwegian brewery

Austmann Bryggeri is a Norwegian craft brewery that is located at Sluppen in Trondheim. The brewery was founded by Thomas Sjue, Vinko Lien Sindelar and Anders Cooper in 2013. The three of them raised capital to build the original brewery by re-financing the homes of two of their mothers and one aunt. The original 9 hectoliter brewery was first opened at Høvringen in Trondheim. Built out of recycled dairy equipment they launched over 60 different kinds of beer in the first two years of production(later this has further increased many fold), of which an increasing share is exported. Austmann now has a core range available throughout Norway in most grocery stores and in bars and restaurants. Approximately 15% of the total volume is exported.

In January 2016, Thomas Sjue, Vinko Lien Sindelar and Anders Cooper partnered with Hansa Borg Bryggerier. Today the three of them own 50% of the shares in Austmann Bryggeri and Hansa Borg Bryggerier owns the other 50%.

A new brewery has been established at Sluppen in Trondheim where Austmann has also opened the Austmann Taproom.

Austmann Bryggeri has taken its name from the Old Norse word "Austmann", which is a name for Norwegians who departed westwards from the Norwegian coast in the 900s.
