= Fredrikstad Bryggeri =

Brewery in Fredrikstad, Norway (1877–2001)

- Formerly: Fredriksstad Bryggeri
- Company type: Brewery
- Industry: Beverage
- Founded: 12 June 1877
- Defunct: 2001
- Fate: Merged with Borg Bryggerier; brewery closed
- Headquarters: Fredrikstad, Norway
- Key people: Carl Johan Kiønig (first managing director), Mads Wiel Stang (first chairman)
- Products: Beer, soft drinks (until 1980)

Fredrikstad Bryggeri, formerly Fredriksstad Bryggeri, was a brewery based in Fredrikstad, Norway, operating between 1877 and 2001.

It was established on 12 June 1877, mainly backed by the city's timber merchant capital. Carl Johan Kiønig was the first managing director, serving until 1921, and Mads Wiel Stang the first chairman.

In 1980, Fredrikstad Bryggeri bought out its competitor in Fredrikstad, Brynildsen, where soft drink production ceased. Fredrikstad Bryggeri's competitor in the neighboring city Sarpsborg, Borg Bryggerier, was also a party in the acquisition, and there were talks about merging the remaining breweries. In 1989 Fredrikstad Bryggeri was merged with Borg. The brewery itself continued to produce beer until it too was closed in 2001. The brand Fredrikstad Bryggeri was still used for a pilsener beer and a Christmas beer, but would be produced at Borg in Sarpsborg.
