= Sagene Bryggeri =

Brewery in Oslo, Norway

Coordinates: 59°55′52″N 10°45′24″E

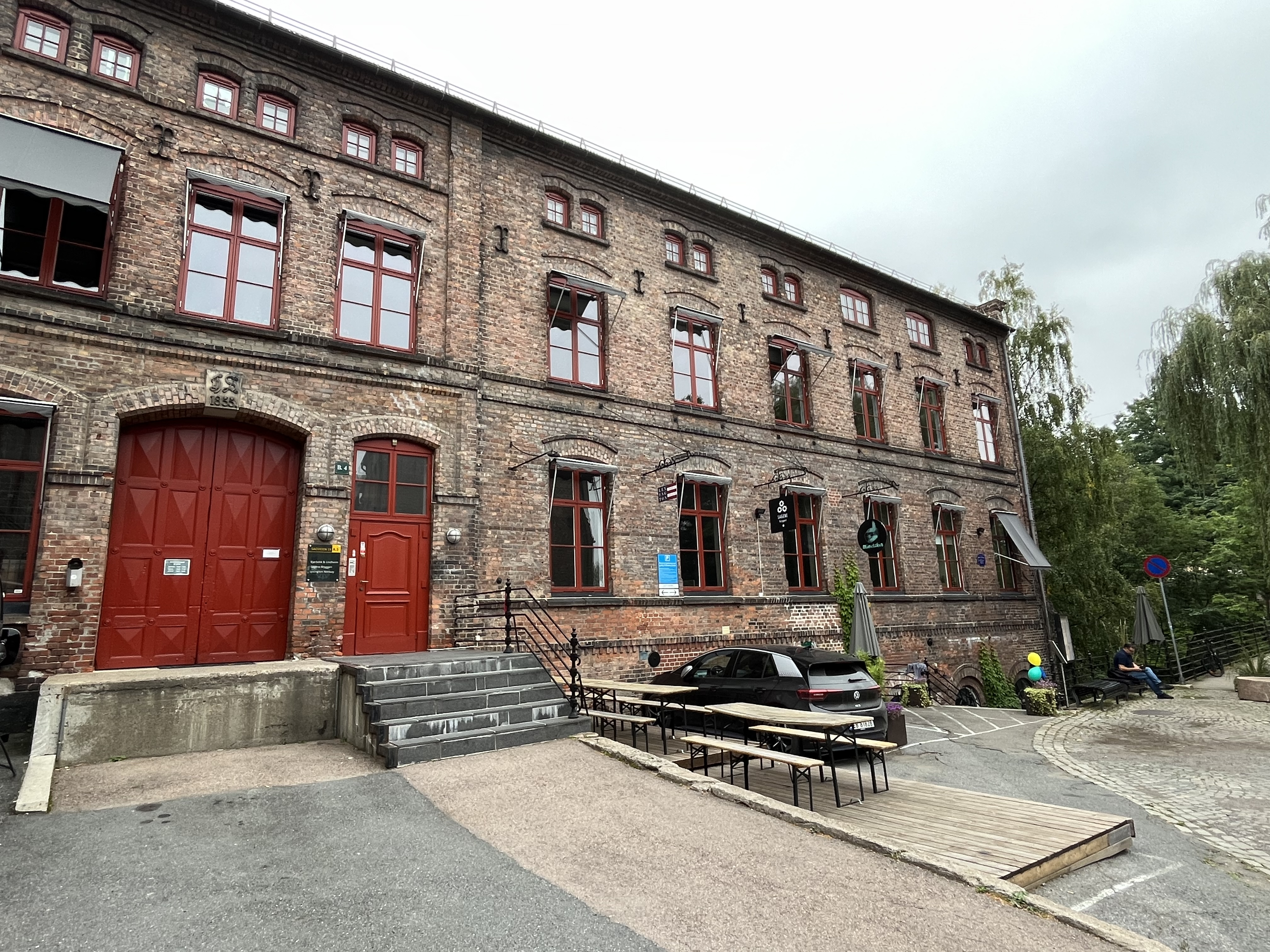
The building

Sagene Bryggeri is a microbrewery at Sagene in Oslo, Norway. The brewery was established in 2013, in central Oslo on the banks of Akerselva. The brewery is located in venerable premises in the former Hjula Veveri, that once housed weavers that created woven fabrics for the population of Oslo.

Arendals Bryggeri creates the beer recipes for distribution to the Norwegian grocery market. Because Sagene Bryggeri wants a wide distribution of its products all over Norway, they have entered into a collaboration with the Rema 1000 store chain, as well as the Vinmonopolet, bars and restaurants. The beer is bottled on both bottles and beverage cans.

== Beers ==
Some products:

- Pilsner
- Bayer (Bavarian style Lager Beer)
- Fatøl (draft beer)
- 6 different Christmas beers (seasonal)
- Wit
- IPA
- Pale ale
