= Svalbard Bryggeri =

Microbrewery in Svalbard, Norway

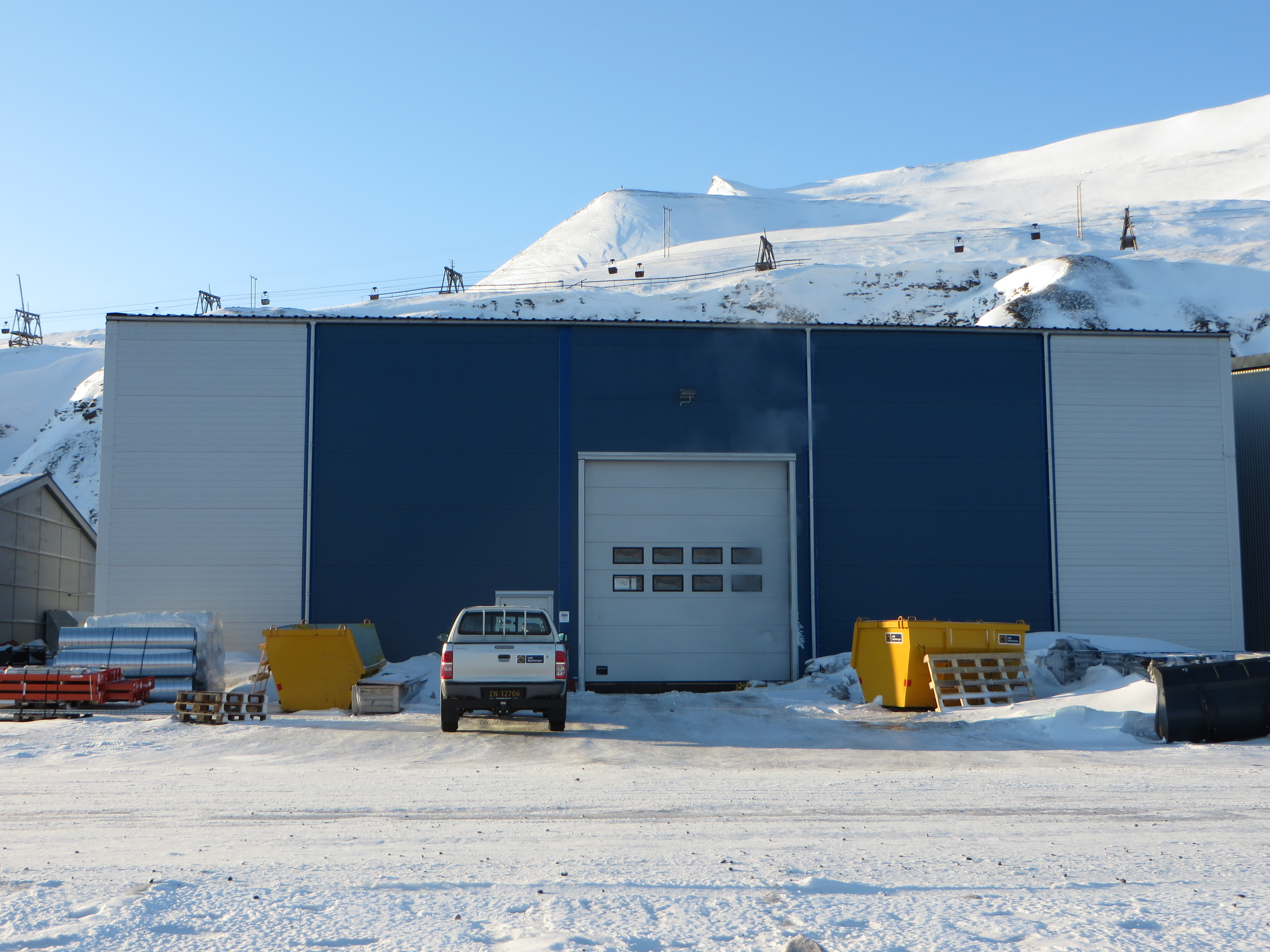
- Location: 78°13′37.4″N 15°36′32″E; Longyearbyen, Svalbard; Norway
- Opened: 2015
- Owned by: Robert Johansen
- Website: www.svalbardbryggeri.no

Svalbard Bryggeri is a microbrewery in Longyearbyen at the island of Spitsbergen, the archipelago of Svalbard, Norway. Svalbard Bryggeri at 78° North is the northernmost commercial brewery in the world.

Establishing a brewery on the Svalbard archipelago required a change of Norwegian law, which prohibited commercial production of alcoholic beverages there. This meant that production was only started as late as 2015, after the law was changed by the Storting and an Italian supplier of equipment delivered and installed them.

The brew is characterized by that 16% of the water used for brewing are thawed ice from the 2,000 year old Bogerbreen glacier. Beverage cans from Svalbard brewery are distributed throughout the mainland Norway and an increasing share is exported. The brewery also offers beer tastings for visitors to Longyearbyen.

== Products ==
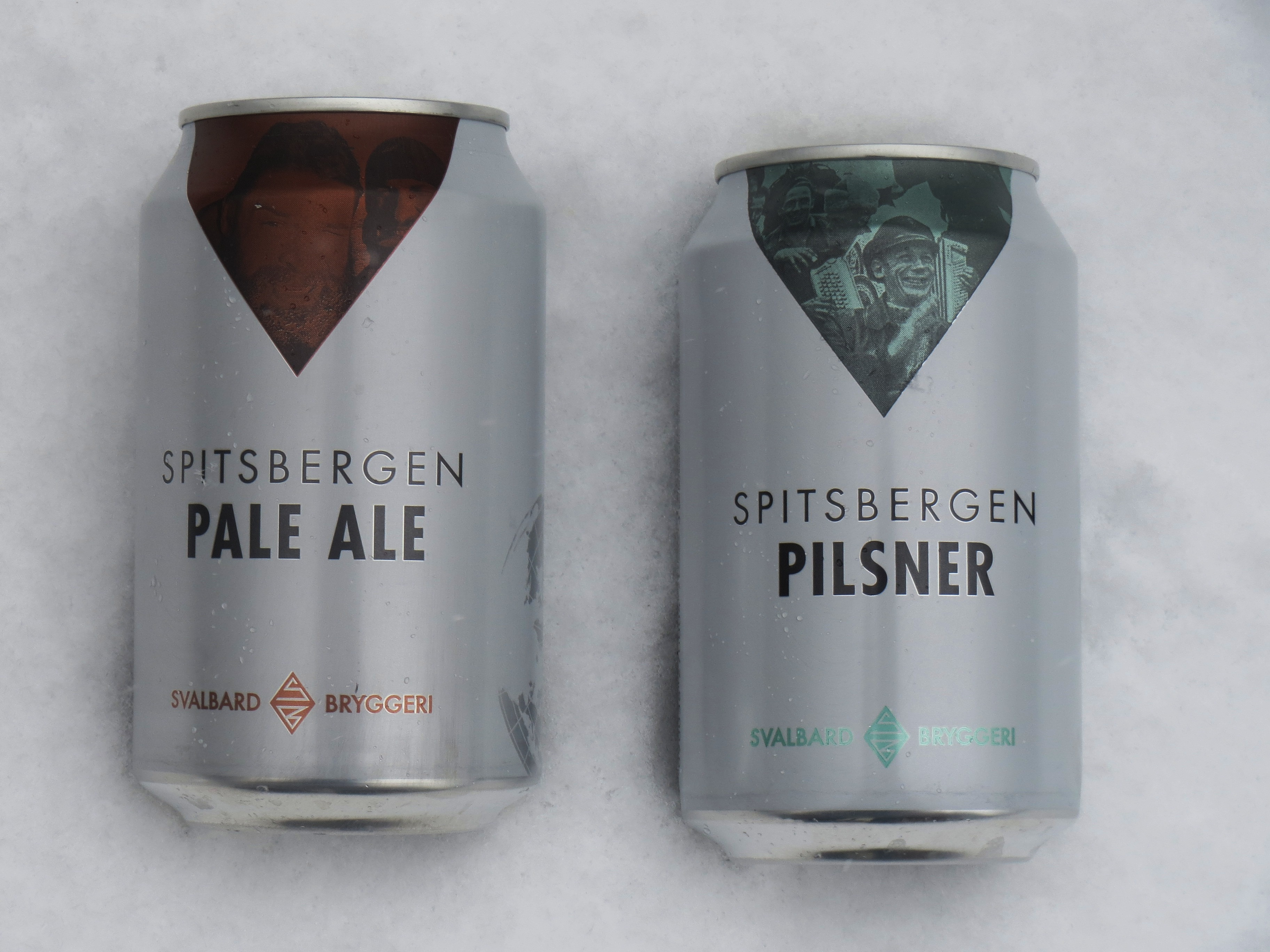
The brewery's Pale Ale and Pilsner

- Spitsbergen IPA
- Spitsbergen Pale ale
- Spitsbergen Pilsner
- Spitsbergen Stout
- Spitsbergen Weißbier
- Spitsbergen Rav Lager
- Spitsbergen Blonde
