= Kveik =

Norwegian family of strains of brewing yeast

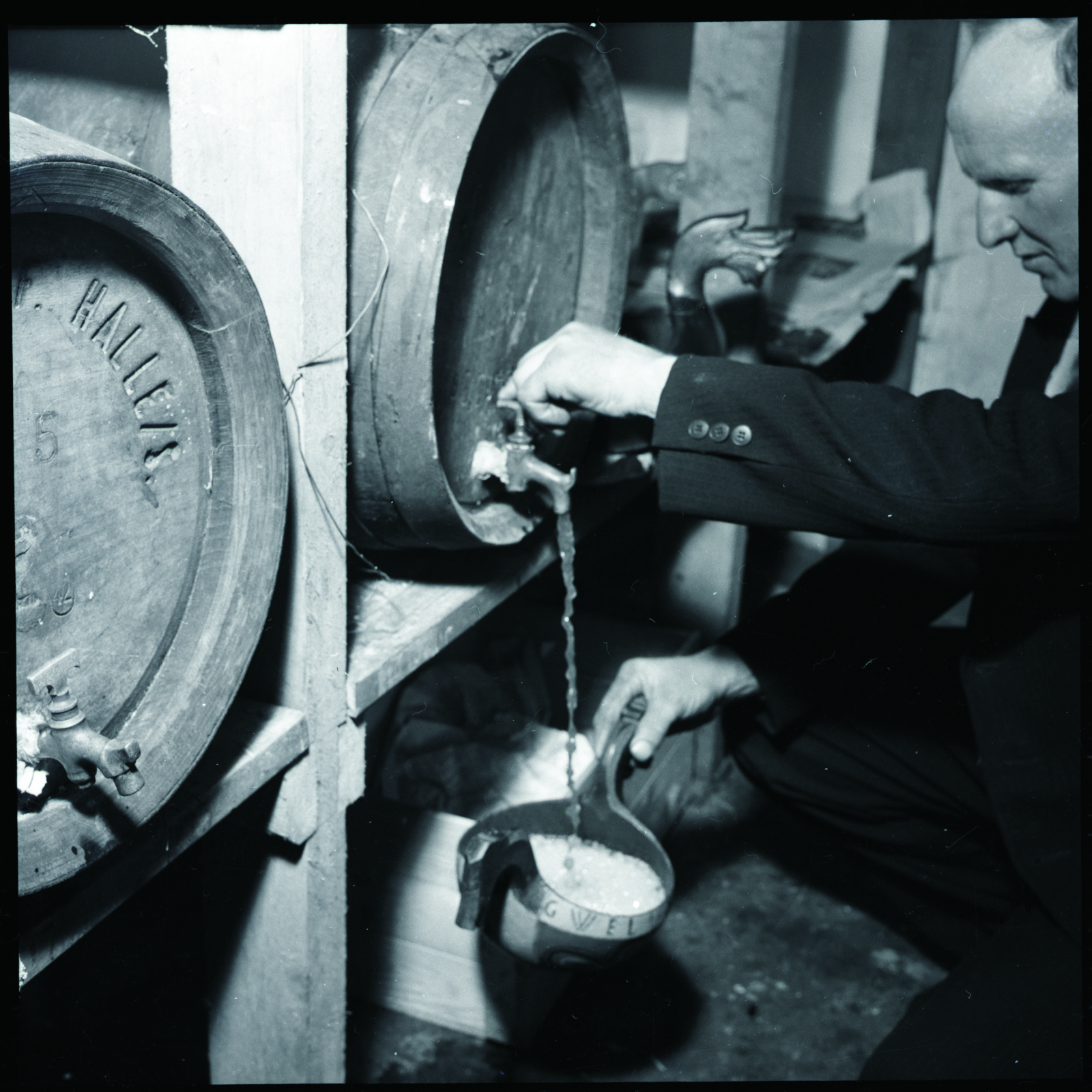
Norwegian farmhouse beer in Hardanger, 1954

Kveik is a collective term for a family of strains of brewing yeast that has been used in Norwegian farmhouse brewing for generations.

== History ==
In the past all Norwegian farmers brewed beer from their own grain. The yeast was kept by the farmers themselves between brews. If a farmer had a brew go sour, or found that the yeast in any way had gone bad or died, they were supplied with new, healthy yeast from a neighboring farm. As farming was modernized and beer became commercially available, most farmhouse brewing died out and the yeast cultures with it. Many places where the brewing tradition survived brewers started to use bread yeast from the local store instead of the old yeast from the farm. The existence of kveik today is a result of a continuous tradition, sometimes only by a handful of traditional brewers in western Norway, that has kept the original kveik strains alive along with local traditions and techniques.

== Origin ==
On the west coast of Norway, from Hardanger in the south to Sunnmøre in the north, there are still some yeast cultures that have survived and are in use to this day. Known cultures are listed in a publicly maintained registry, together with other farmhouse yeast cultures.

These yeast cultures have often been handed down from father to son along with the knowledge of malting grain and brewing. All the strains that have been collected and analyzed in a laboratory have turned out to belong to the species Saccharomyces cerevisiae (common brewing yeast). They are also more closely related to each other genetically than to the yeast strains from other parts of the world. Thus, the surviving yeast on the west coast of Norway makes up a subcategory on the phylogenetic tree of brewing yeast, and it is yeasts belonging to this family which are referred to as kveik.

No kveik has as yet been found outside of western Norway.

== Genetics ==
Genetic analysis shows that kveik belongs to the large category of brewing yeast called "Beer 1", which includes many of the known yeast strains from Germany, Belgium, Great Britain, and the USA. Kveik seems to be a hybrid of a progenitor from this known family with an unknown yeast, most likely a wild yeast.

== Properties ==
Although kveik is a domesticated brewer's yeast it differs from most modern brewer's yeast in several ways:

- It can ferment at much higher temperatures without causing off-flavors. Ordinary brewer's yeast will usually produce off-flavors above 25C (77F), but kveik can go as high as 43C (109F) without ill effects.
- It completes fermentation of the beer faster than other yeasts, and the beer can be drunk earlier with less time to mature.
- Less yeast must be pitched than with typical brewer's yeast.
- It produces other aromas, often reminiscent of tropical fruits. Chemically it produces more fatty esters than ordinary yeast.

== Etymology ==
Kveik is the most common dialect word for yeast in the parts of Norway where these strains originate. Many traditional brewers refer to their own yeast as 'kveik' whilst the commercially available yeast is called simply 'yeast'. The word 'kveik' in the meaning of 'yeast' stems from the old Norse word 'kvikk' (Eng: vigorous and fast) in the meaning of 'healthy, lively'. The English word 'quick' comes from the same root.

== International spread ==
In recent years kveik has spread from the traditional brewers on the west coast of Norway to modern home brewers and some commercial breweries in Norway, and even the rest of the world. Kveik is now sold commercially by laboratories in the USA, Canada, Ireland, Britain, and Poland. Commercial brews are being made and sold using the kveik yeast strains globally, and the interest for these particular yeast strains has increased immensely. Beer festivals dedicated to beer brewed with kveik have been organized in the USA.
