= Haandbryggeriet =

Norwegian brewery

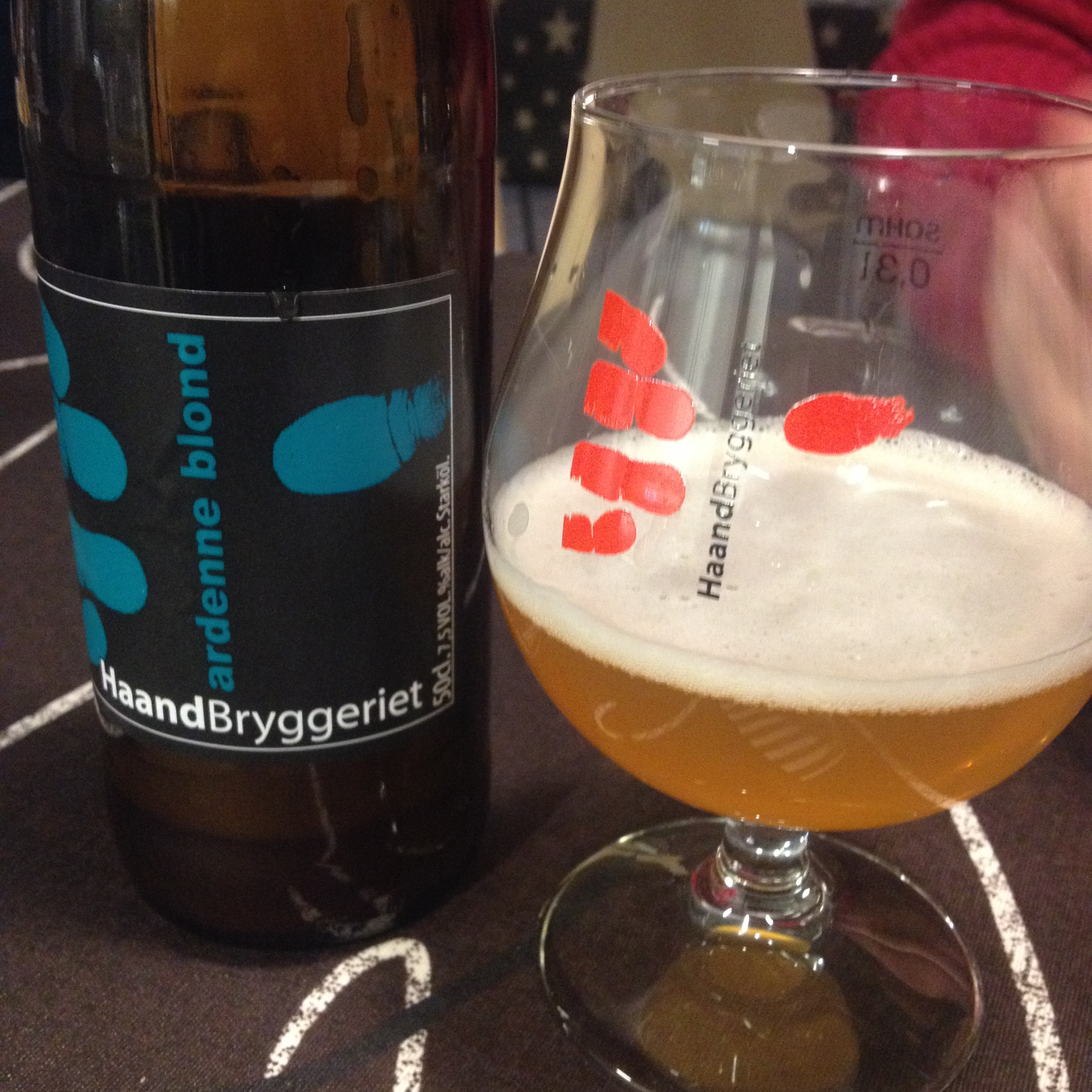
- Industry: Alcoholic beverage
- Founded: 2005
- Headquarters: Drammen, Norway
- Products: Craft beer
- Production output: 350,000 L (2012)
- Number of employees: 20 (2026)
- Website: www.haandbryggeriet.net

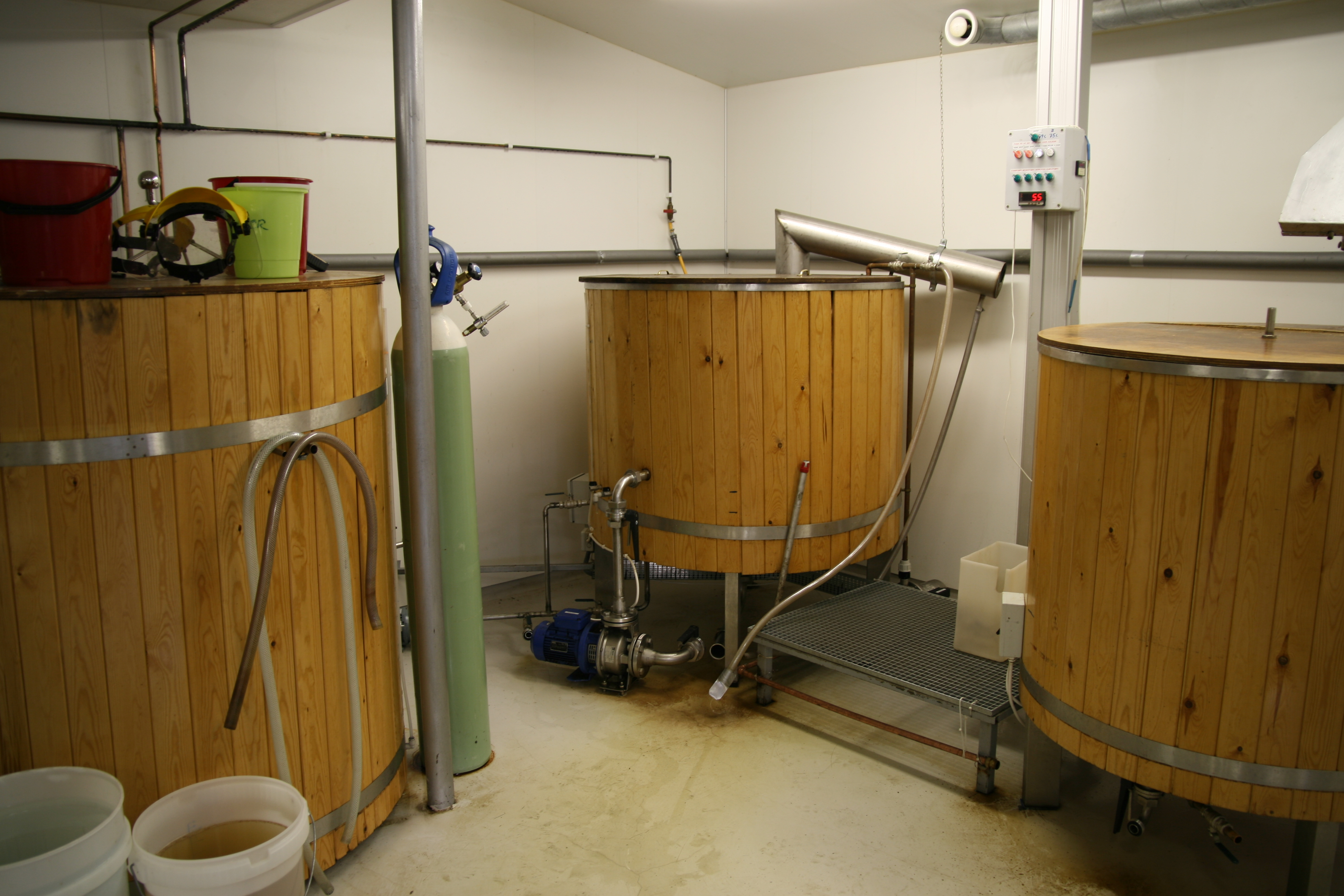
The mash tun, circa 2008

Haandbryggeriet is a Norwegian brewery founded in 2005 by Jens Maudal, Rune Eriksen, Arne Eide and Egil Hilde. The brewery was situated at the site of an old textile factory in Drammen, then in a railroad yard, and now resides in an old industrial building. Their brewing equipment was bought used in England and has a capacity of about 900 liters per batch. Production in 2006 was near 40,000 liters. In 2012, production was expected to be approximately 350,000 liters, using an 800 liter brewing equipment. In 2013, they upgraded yet again, to a 5,000 liter brewing tank.

Haandbryggeriet offer a number of beers, most of which are available domestically from the Vinmonopolet and grocery stores. They also export much of their beer, especially to the United States.

The beer they brew is not filtered, pasteurized or artificially carbonated, qualifying them as real ales.

Haandbryggeriet has also begun importing specialty beers from highly regarded microbreweries abroad, including Brouwerij De Molen, De Dolle Brouwers, Jolly Pumpkin and Southern Tier.

== See also ==
- Beer in Norway
- Barrel-aged beer
- Sour beer
