= Aass Brewery =

Norwegian brewery

Coordinates: 59°44′29″N 10°12′40″E

Aass Brewery (Norwegian: Aass Bryggeri) is Norway's oldest brewery still active. Founded in 1834 in Drammen, Norway, the brewery's primary products are beer and aquavit. The company also produces a wide range of soft drinks. Aass was also co-owner of the Norwegian soda pop brand A/S Solo.

== History ==
Originally a company dealing in timber, groceries, baking and brewing, the brewery was bought by farmer's son Poul Lauritz Aass in the 1860s. The brewery is still owned by the Aass family, which makes it one of Norway's few remaining independent breweries.

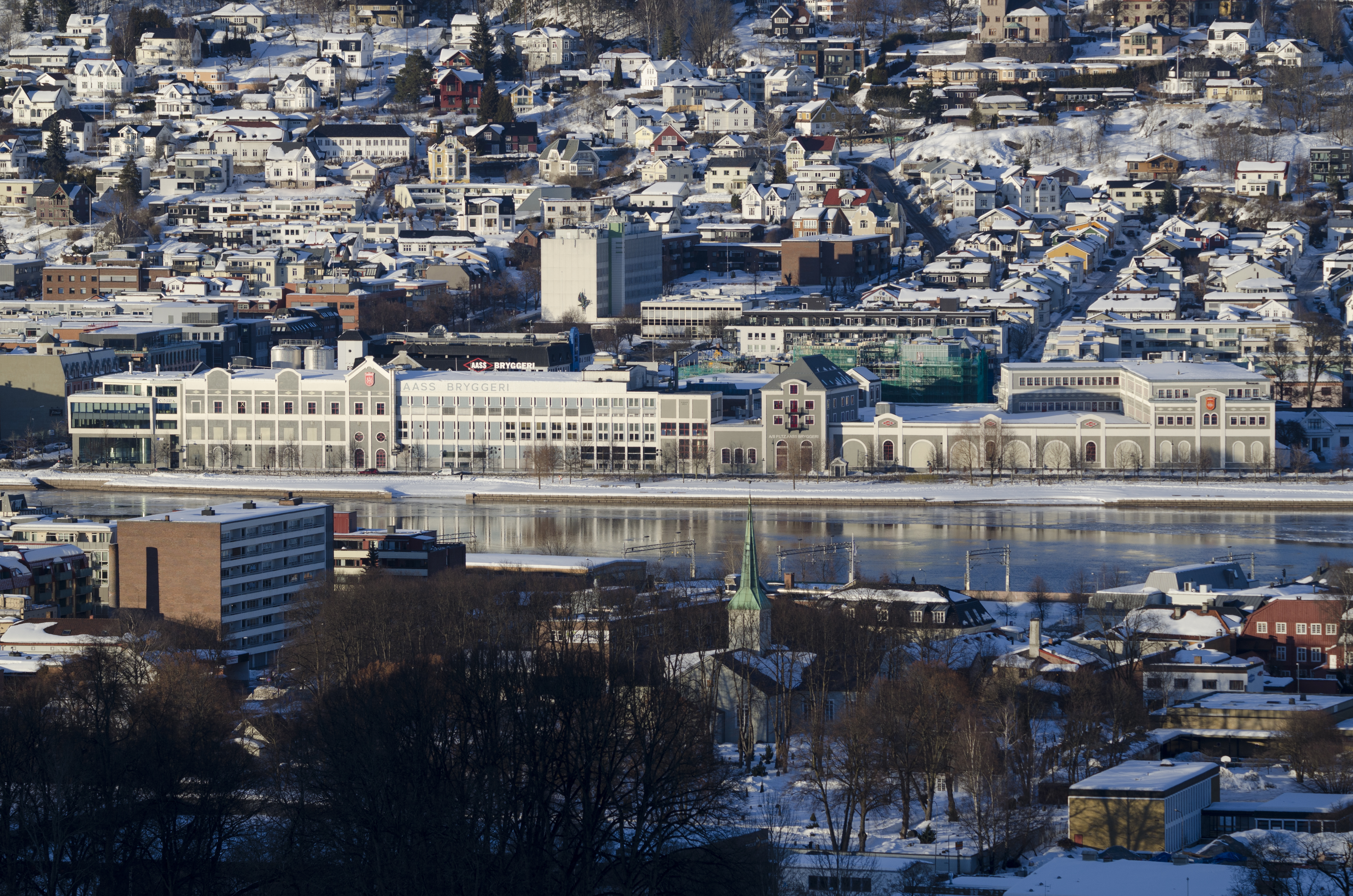
Aass Brewery in Drammen

Drammensølets venner (the Friends of the Beer from Drammen) is an association that supports the brewery, arranging various events and publishing a newsletter about 4 times a year. It is the world's 2nd largest such association, currently boasting about 35,000 members.

== Beers ==
Juleøl (strong seasonal Christmas beer), Pilsner, Fatøl, Classic (amber), Pale Ale, Bock Beer, Gull and a dark Munich-style lager called Aass Bayer. And many more.
