= Kinn Bryggeri =

Norwegian brewery

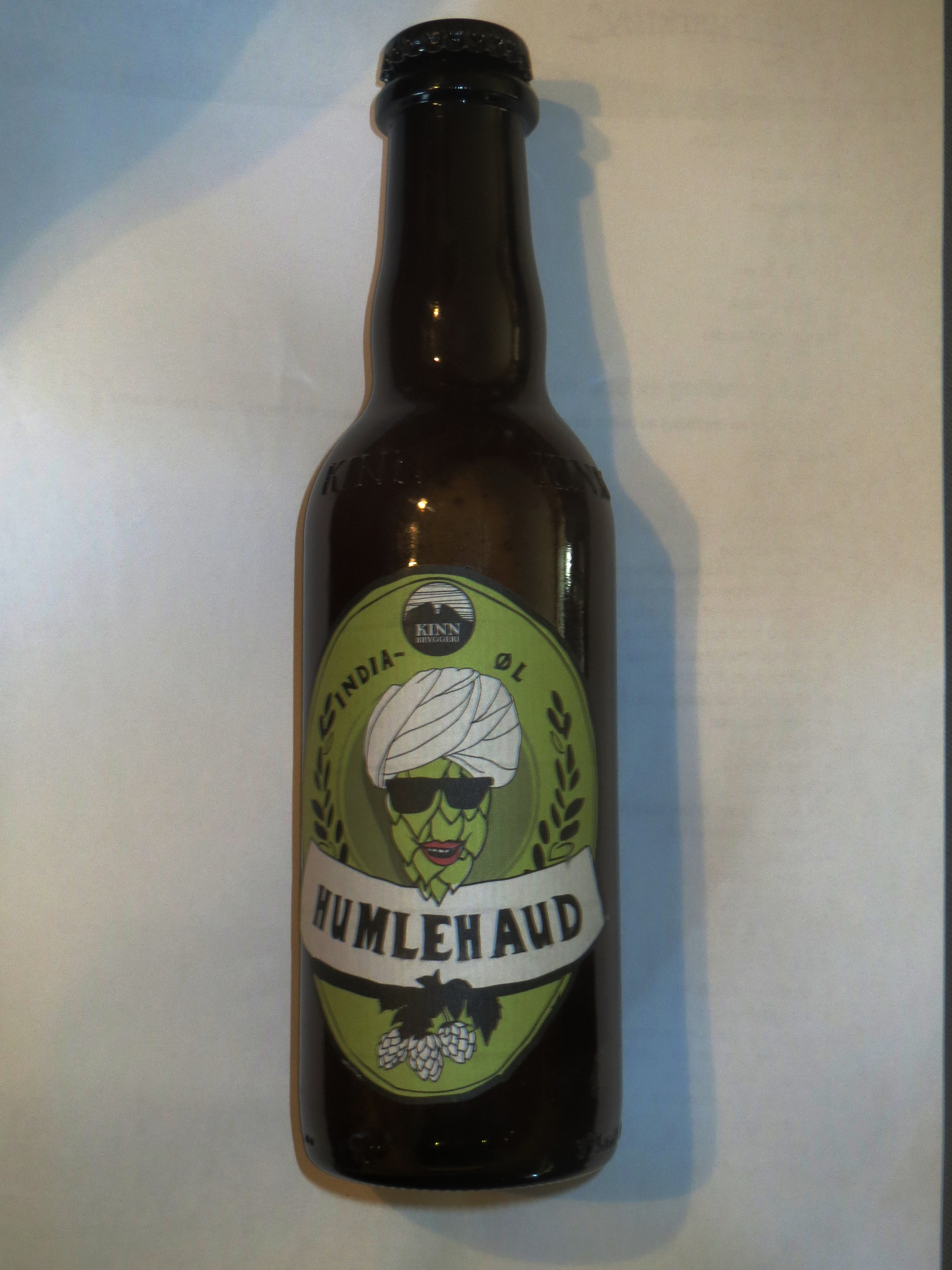
Homlehaud, an India Pale Ale of Kinn Bryggeri

Kinn Bryggeri AS is a microbrewery in the town of Florø in Vestland county, Norway. It was established in 2009.

At Kinn Bryggeri, craft beers are brewed. A large number of different beers are produced, mostly in English and Belgian style. The beer is based on the clean water from Sagafjella. Old craftsmanship, such as open fermentation and bottle molding are important. None of the beers are pasteurized or filtered, and everything is produced at the two brewery locations in Florø. Kinn beer is distributed throughout Norway, as well as an increasing share that is exported to a variety of other countries.
