= Hansa Brewery =

Local brewery of Bergen, Norway

Hansa Bryggeri (Hansa Brewery) is the local brewery of Bergen, Norway.

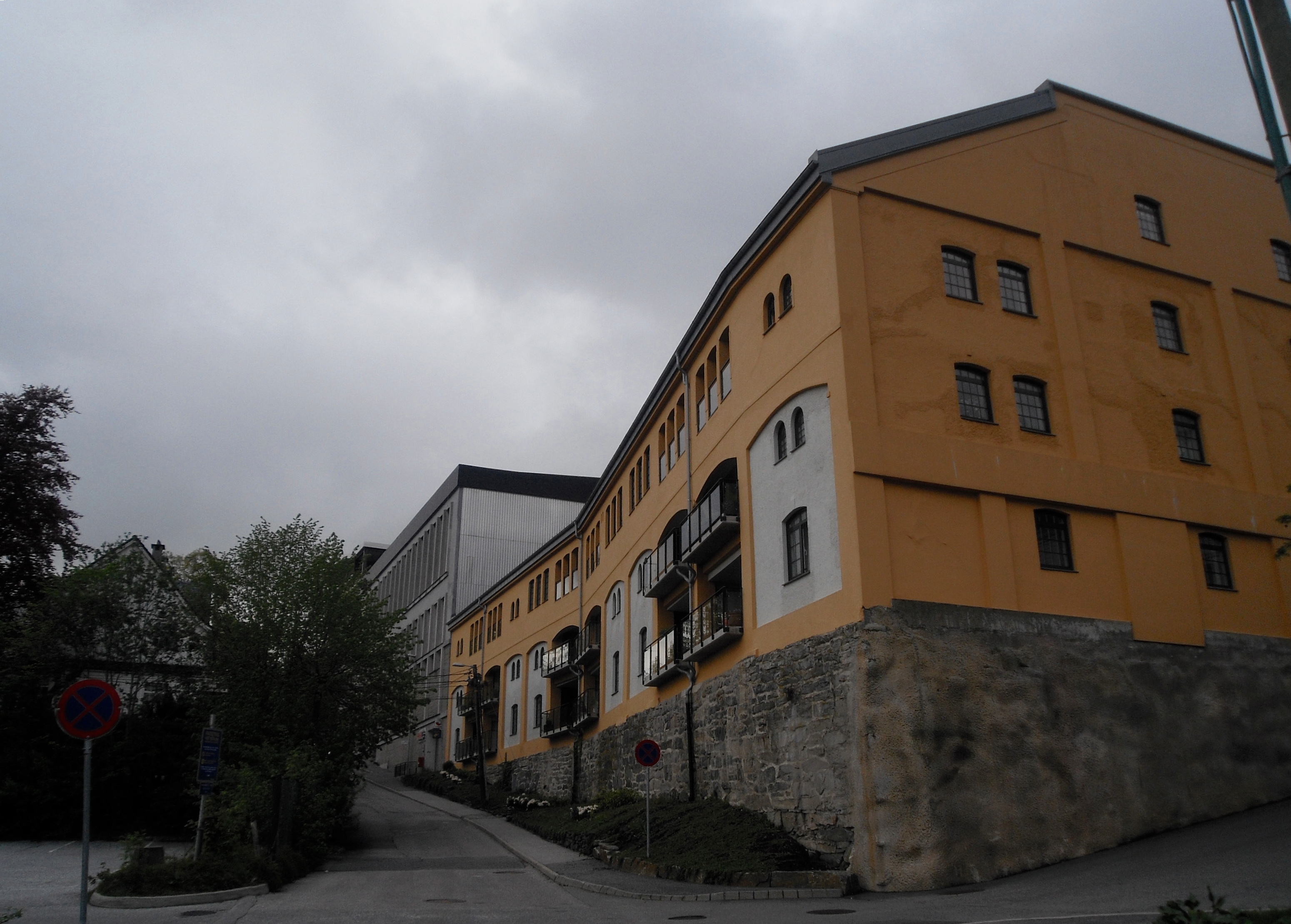
Hansa Brewery in Kalfaret, Bergen, Norway

It was established in 1891 by Waldemar Stoud Platou when he acquired the minor local brewery Det Sembske Bryggeri. The name "Hansa" is meant to reflect Bergen's history as one of the Hansa trading cities.

The brewery was originally situated in a part of Bergen called Kalfaret, at the foot of mount Fløyen, but relocated to an industrial area outside the city during the 1980s.

Hansa Bryggeri merged with the Østfold-based Borg Bryggerier (Borg Breweries) in 1997, which resulted in the creation of the company Hansa Borg Bryggerier.
