= Borg Bryggerier =

Brewery in Sarpsborg, Norway

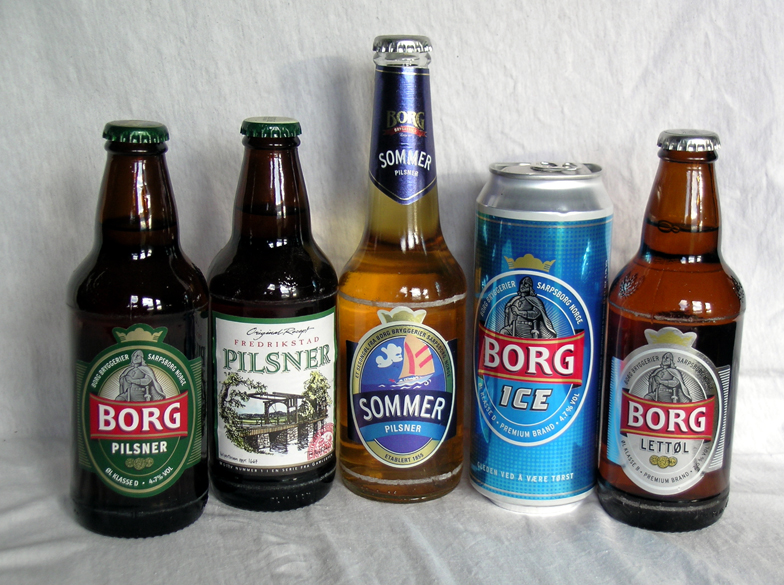
Beers from Borg Bryggeri

Borg Bryggerier was formerly an independent brewery based in the city of Sarpsborg, Norway.

Borg Bryggerier was founded in 1855 under the name Lande Gaard og Bryggeri by merchant Hans Hafslund. In 1905, the Egenæss family acquired the brewery. It has been owned by members of the Egenæss family since then. Following the acquisition of the Halden Bryggeri during the 1960s, and the merger with Fredrikstad Bryggeri in 1989, Borg became the undisputed largest brewery in Østfold.

In 1997, Borg was merged with the Bergen-based Hansa Bryggeri, which created the company Hansa Borg Bryggerier, of which the Egenæss family owns 60% of the shareholdings.
