= Hansa Borg Bryggerier =

Norwegian brewery

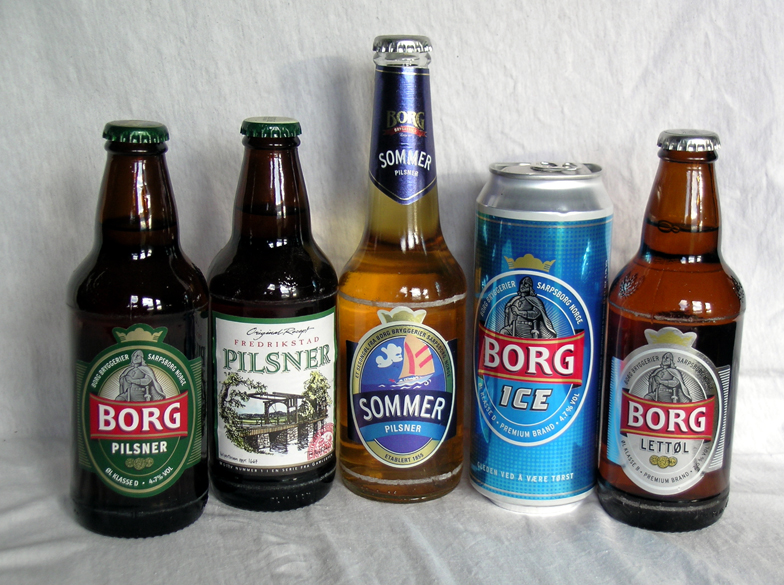
- Various beers from Hansa Borg Bryggerier
- Founded: 14 October 1996
- Headquarters: Norway
- Number of employees: 300

Hansa Borg Bryggerier is a Norwegian brewery and distribution company which markets beer, bottled water and soft drinks.

== History ==
Hansa Borg Bryggerier AS was founded in 1997, after a merger between Hansa Bryggeri and Borg Bryggerier. The company is controlled by the Egenæss family (75% ownership), who owned Borg since 1905 until the merger in 1997. Other principal owners are the Swedish-based Spendrups Bryggeri AB and Danish-based Royal Unibrew.

The brewery is Norway's second largest manufacturing and marketing of beer and mineral water. It operates three regional breweries plants located in Bergen, Sarpsborg, Kristiansand and Olden, Norway. Beer brands include Hansa, Waldemars, Borg and CB, as well as Heineken and Clausthaler under license. In 1999, Hansa Borg acquired Christianssands Bryggeri (CB). This gave Hansa Borg nationwide distribution of all its three main brands of beer, as well as controlling the local markets in Hordaland, Østfold, and Southern Norway. In 2005, Hansa Borg acquired Olden Brevatn, a company that produces drinking water from a glacier in Oldedalen.

In 2024 they attempted to get into Norway's diet soda trend by becoming an official distributor of Faxe Kondi, but they only sold the diet versions and not the regular versions despite competition from imports of the regular versions at the Normal store chain, and they also incorrectly marketed the diet version as the "original" version, the result being that their distribution flopped.
