= List of drinks =

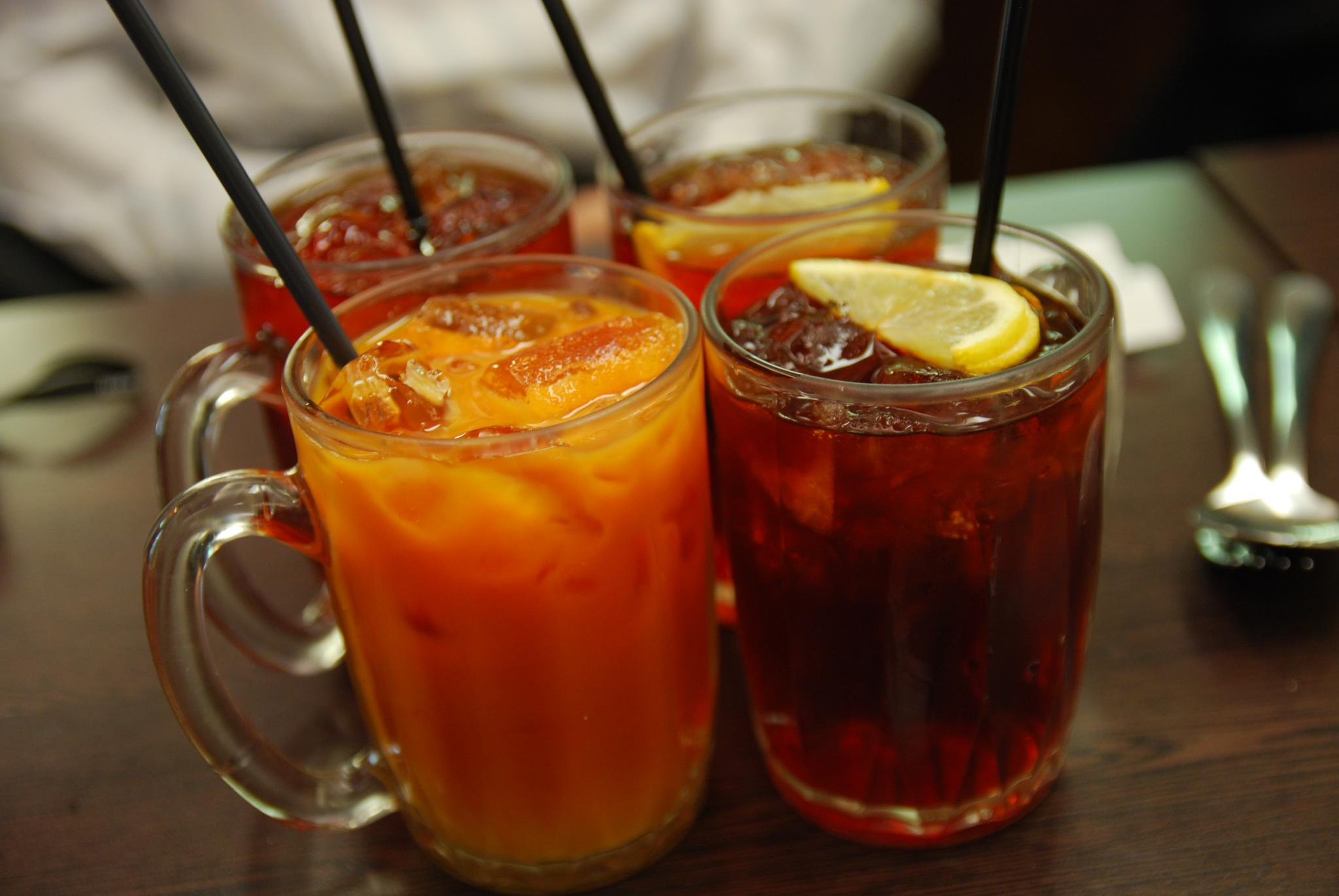
Ice milk and lemon tea

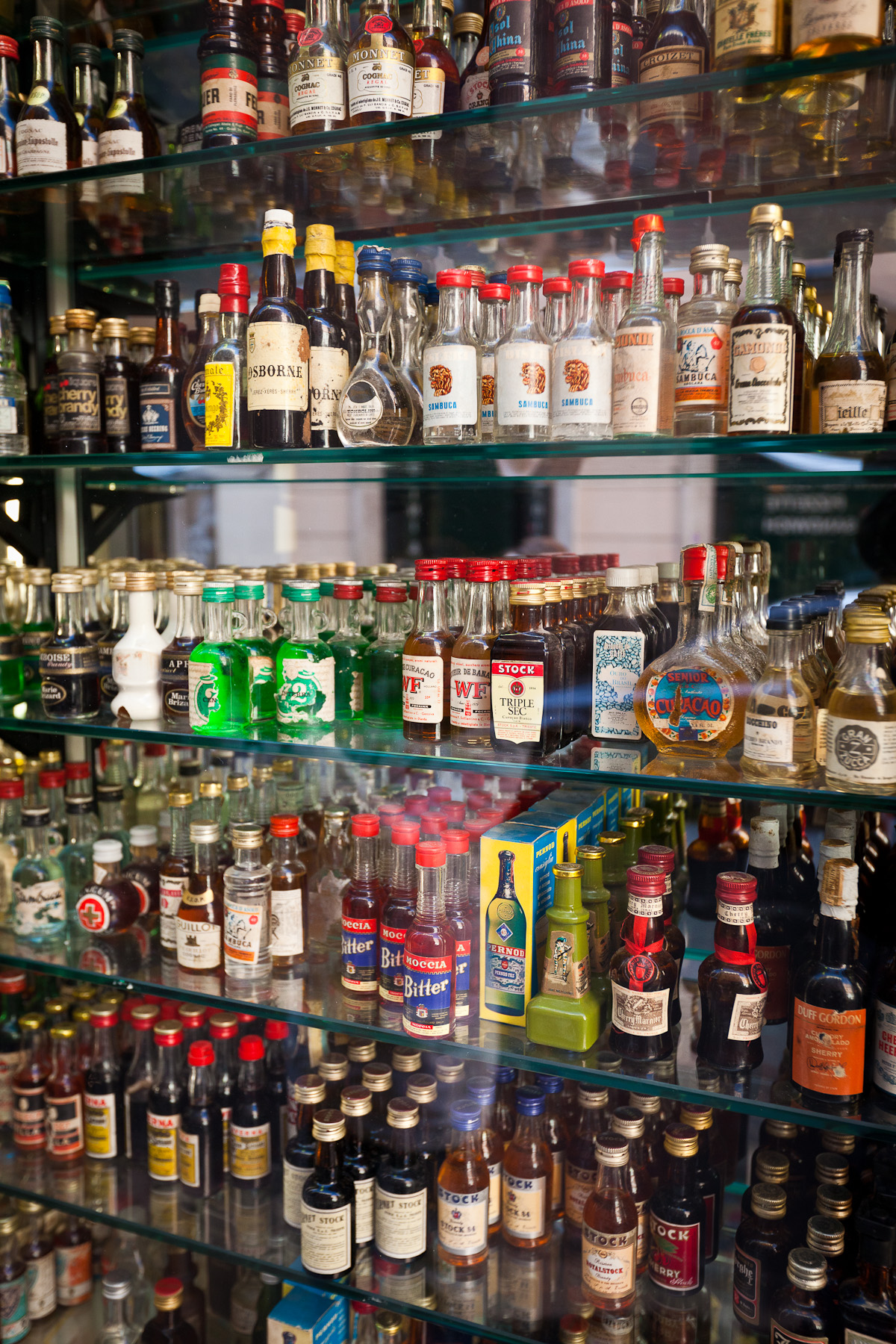
Various distilled drinks

Drinks are liquids that can be consumed, with drinking water being the base ingredient for many of them. In addition to basic needs, drinks form part of the culture of human society. In a commercial setting, drinks other than water may be termed beverages.

== Alcoholic drinks ==
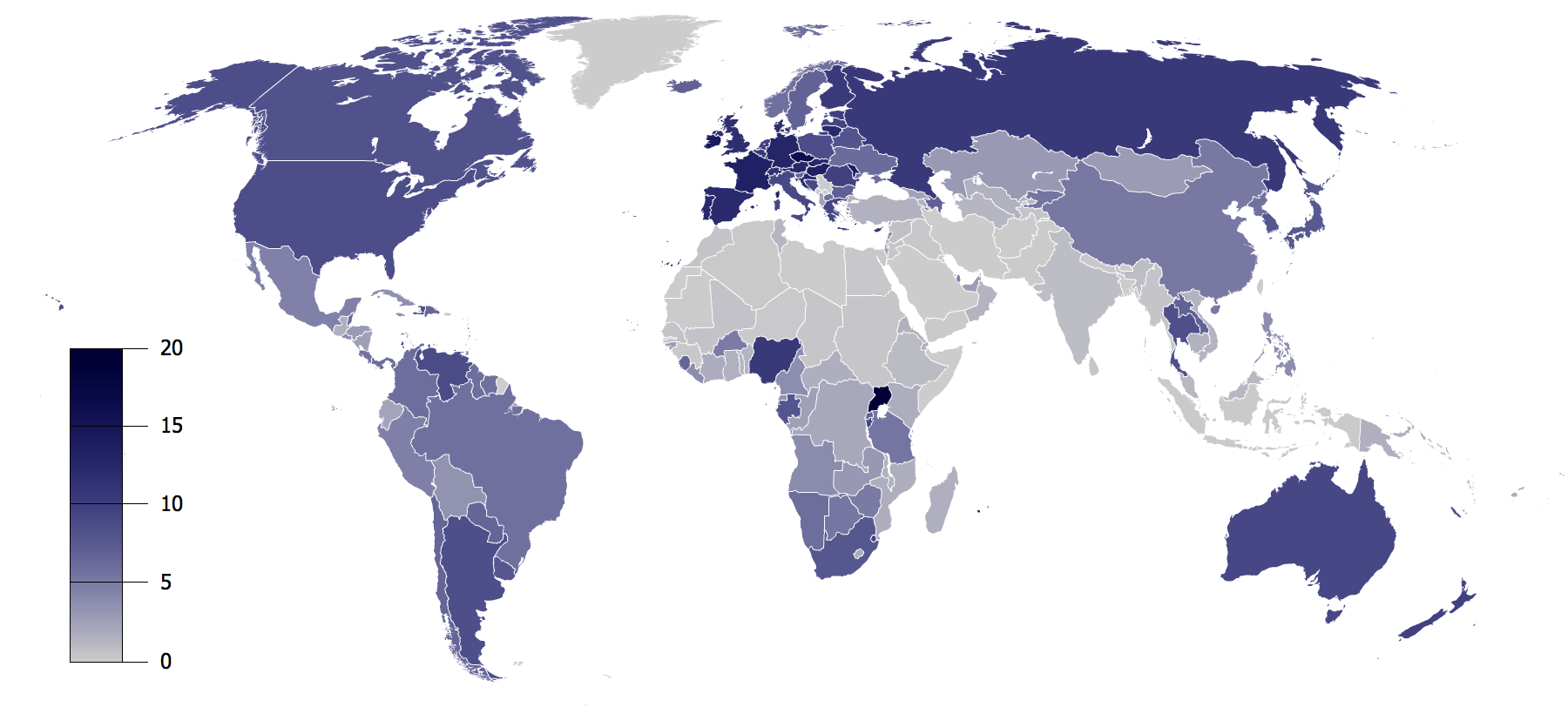
2004 data of alcohol consumption per capita (age 15 or older), per year, by country, in liters of pure alcohol

Alcoholic drink – An alcoholic beverage is a drink containing ethanol, commonly known as alcohol, although in chemistry the definition of an alcohol includes many other compounds. Alcoholic drinks, such as wine, beer, and liquor have been part of human culture and development for 9,000 years. Many brands of alcoholic drinks are produced worldwide.

=== Beer ===
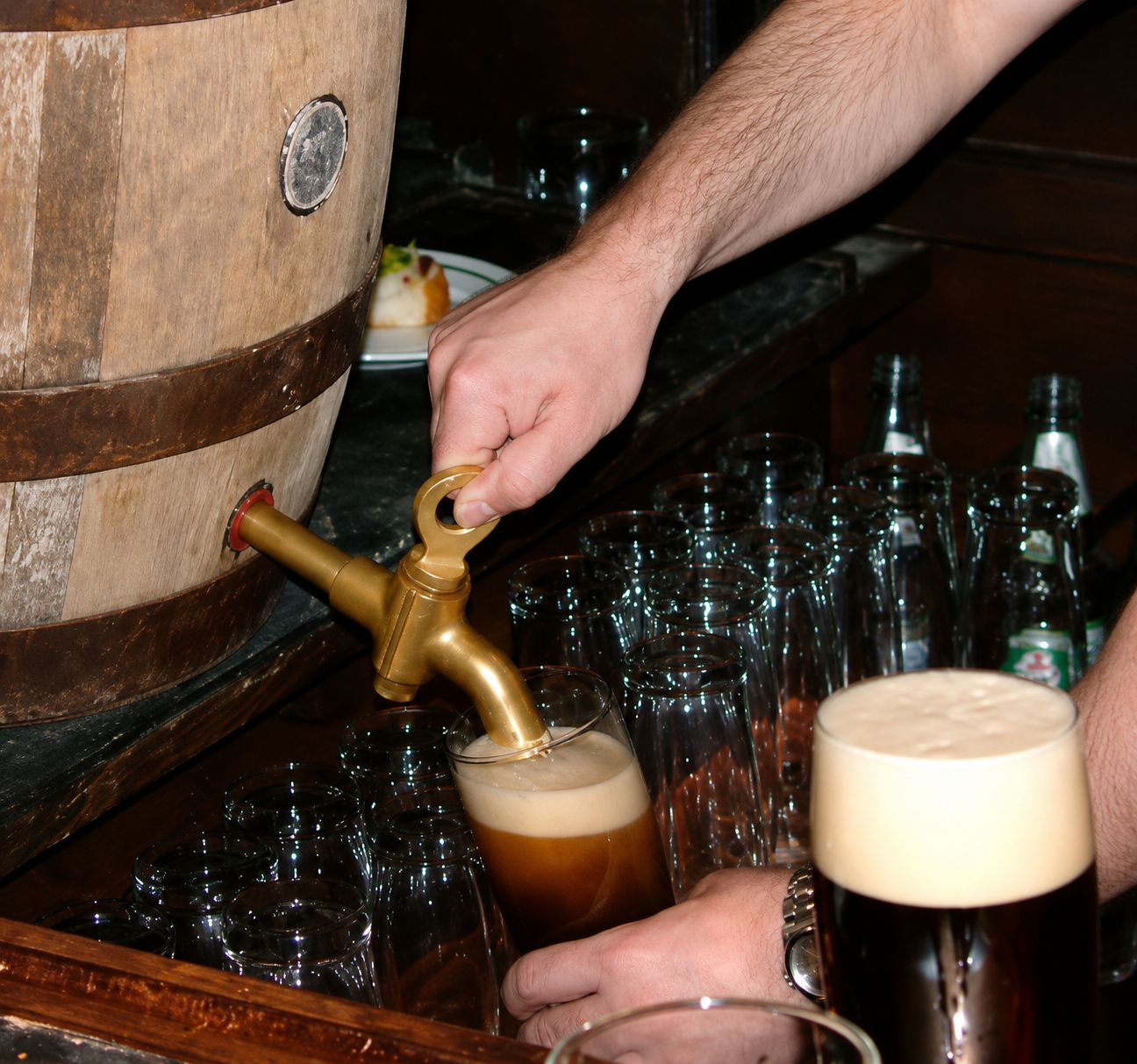
Beer being poured from a cask

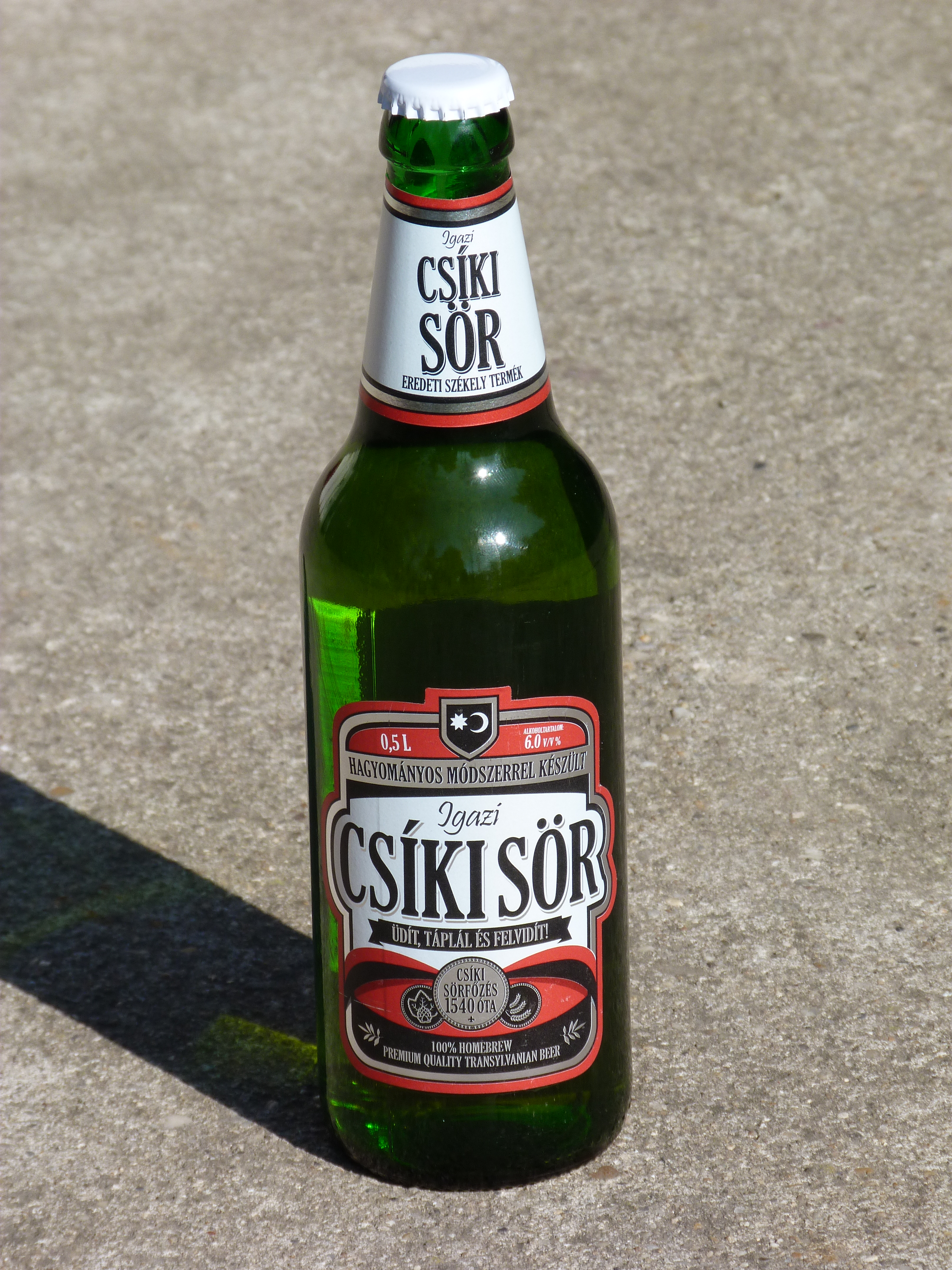
Bottled beer

Beer is produced by the saccharification of starch and fermentation of the resulting sugar. The starch and saccharification enzymes are often derived from malted cereal grains, most commonly malted barley and malted wheat. Most beer is flavoured with hops, which add bitterness and act as a natural preservative, though other flavourings such as herbs or fruit may occasionally be included. The preparation of beer is called brewing.

- Beer and breweries by region
- List of beer styles
- List of microbreweries

==== By country ====
- Beer and breweries by region
- Beer classification in Sweden and Finland
- List of beer organisations
- List of countries by beer consumption per capita
- Beer in Armenia
- Beer in Australia
  - List of breweries in Australia
- Beer in Austria
- Beer in Belgium
- Beer in Canada
  - List of breweries in Canada
- Beer in Azerbaijan
- Beer in Belarus
- Beer in Bosnia and Herzegovina
- Beer in Brazil
- Beer in Bulgaria
- Beer in Cape Verde
- Beer in Chile
- Beer in China
- Beer in Colombia
- Beer in Croatia
- Beer in Denmark
- Beer in England
- Beer in Finland
- Beer in France
- Beer in Germany
- Beer in Greece
- Beer in Hong Kong
- Beer in Hungary
- Beer in Iceland
- Beer in India
- Beer in Iran
- Beer in Ireland
- Beer in Israel
- Beer in Italy
- Beer in Japan
- Beer in Kazakhstan
- Beer in Kenya
- Beer in Mexico
- Beer in Morocco
- Beer in New Zealand
- Beer in North Korea
- Beer in Norway
- Beer in Poland
- Beer in Portugal
- Beer in Romania
- Beer in Russia
- Beer in Scotland
- Beer in Serbia
- Beer in Singapore
- Beer in Slovakia
- Beer in Slovenia
- Beer in South Africa
- Beer in South Korea
- Beer in Sweden
- Beer in Syria
- Beer in Taiwan
- Beer in Thailand
- Beer in the Caribbean
- Beer in the Czech Republic
- Beer in the Netherlands
- Beer in the Philippines
- Beer in the United Kingdom
- Beer in Tibet
- Beer in Turkey
- Beer in Ukraine
- Beer in Vietnam
- Beer in Wales
- Beer in the United States
  - List of breweries in the United States

=== Cider ===
Cider

Cider – cider is a fermented alcoholic drink made from apple juice. Cider alcohol content varies from 1.2% ABV to 8.5% or more in traditional English ciders. In some regions, cider may be called "apple wine".

- List of cider brands

=== Distilled (liquor) ===
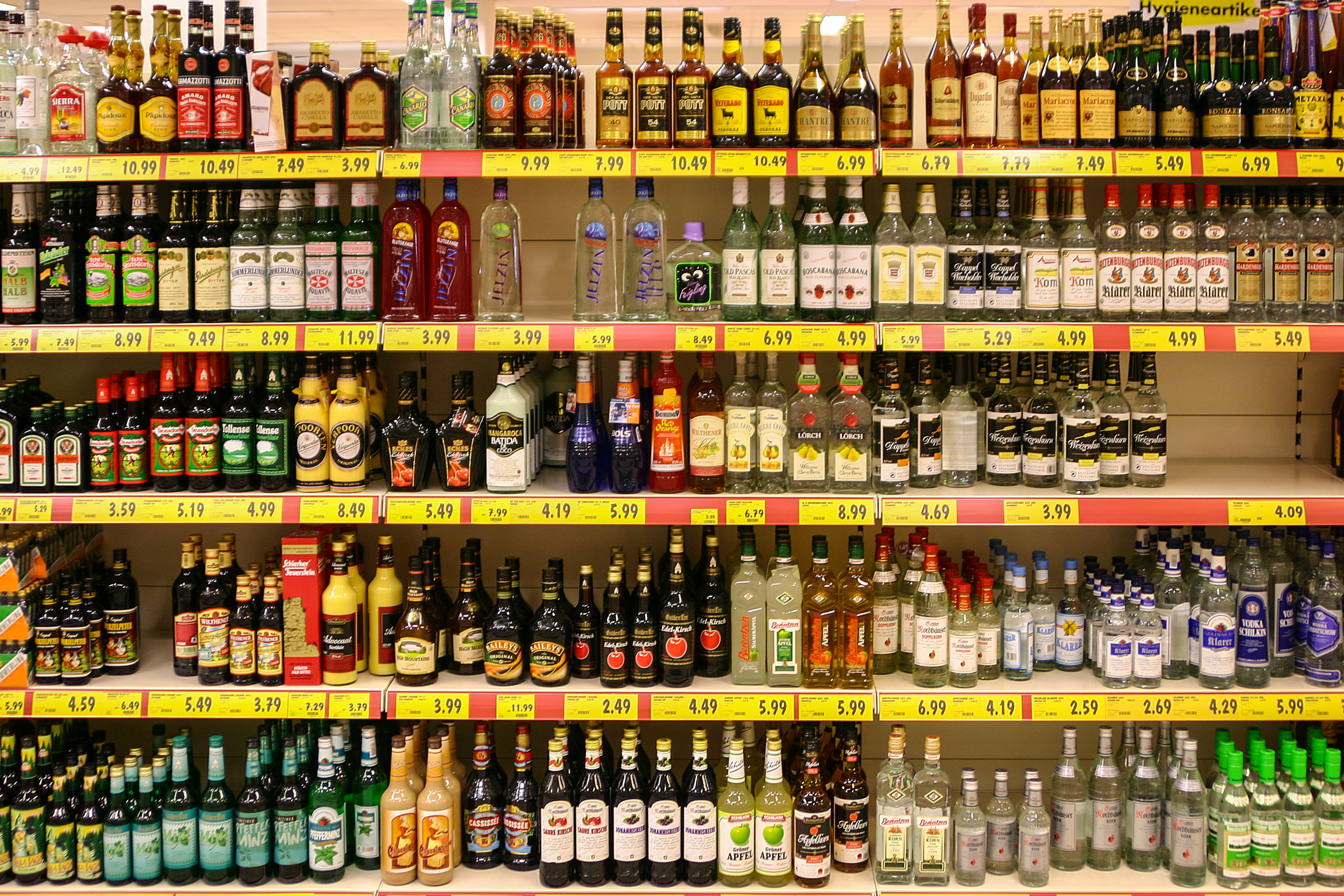
A display of spirits in a supermarket

Distilled drinks – also known as liquor and spirits, a distilled drink is an alcoholic drink produced by distillation of a mixture produced from alcoholic fermentation, such as wine. This process purifies it and removes diluting components like water, for the purpose of increasing its proportion of alcohol content (commonly known as alcohol by volume, ABV). As distilled drinks contain more alcohol they are considered "harder" – in North America, the term hard liquor is used to distinguish distilled drinks from undistilled ones, which are implicitly weaker.

- List of gin brands
- List of liqueurs
  - List of national liquors
- List of rum brands
- List of tequilas
- List of vodkas
- List of whisky brands

==== Cocktails ====
Cocktails – a cocktail refers to any kind of alcoholic mixed drink that contains two or more ingredients. As generally understood today, a cocktail requires at least one alcoholic component—typically a distilled spirit, although beer and wine are permissible—and one sweet component; it may also contain a souring or bittering ingredient.

- List of cocktails
  - List of IBA official cocktails
  - List of cocktails with wine, sparkling wine, or port
  - List of martini variations
- Beer cocktail
- Cocktails with cachaça
- Highball
- List of flaming beverages
- List of martini variations
- Well drink
- Wine cocktail

=== Hard soda ===
Hard soda also known as Alcopop is a type of alcoholic drink that is manufactured in the style of a soft drink.

=== Wine ===
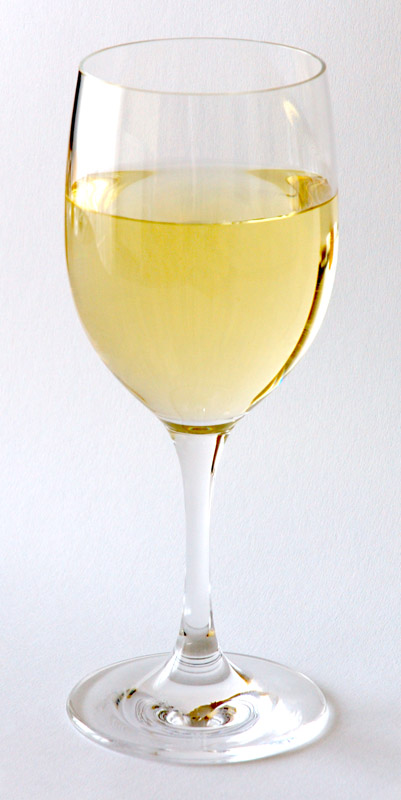
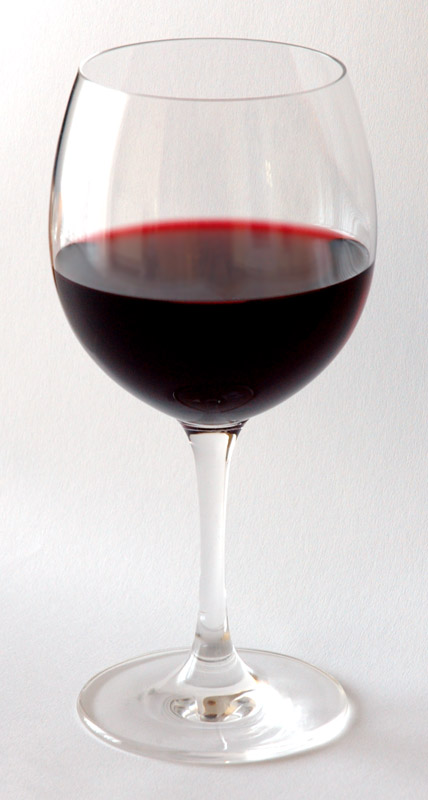
Wine glasses with white wine and red wine

Wine is an alcoholic drink made from fermented grapes or other fruits. The natural chemical balance of grapes lets them ferment without the addition of sugars, acids, enzymes, water, or other nutrients. Yeast consumes the sugars in the grapes and converts them into alcohol and carbon dioxide. Different varieties of grapes and strains of yeasts produce different styles of wine. The well-known variations result from the very complex interactions between the biochemical development of the fruit, reactions involved in fermentation, terroir and subsequent appellation, along with human intervention in the overall process.

- Glossary of wine terms
- Wine cocktail
- Outline of wine
- Wine tasting descriptors
- List of wine professionals
- List of grape varieties

==== By country ====
- List of Appellation d'Origine Contrôlée wines (France)
- List of Italian DOC wines
- List of Italian DOCG wines
- List of Italian IGT wines
- List of VDQS wines (France)
- List of wine-producing regions
- Wine in China

== Non-alcoholic drinks ==
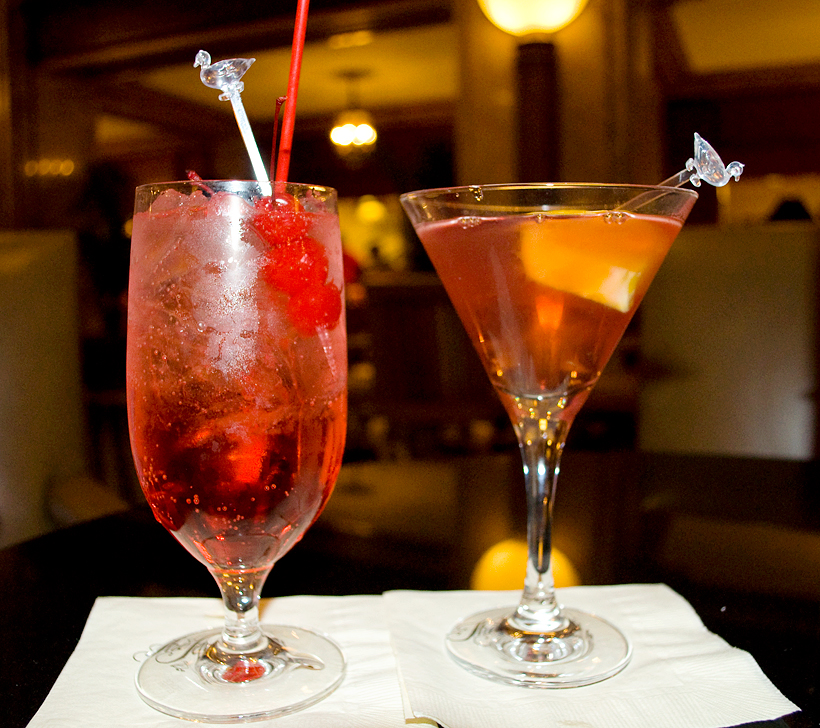
Mixed drinks: a non-alcoholic Shirley Temple (left) and alcoholic Cosmopolitan (right)

Mixed drinks – a mixed drink is a drink in which two or more ingredients are mixed. Some mixed drinks contain liquor while others are non-alcoholic.

This section contains Non-alcoholic drinks that do not contain other psychoactive substances as well (for example, coffee). Some of the drinks in this sections is also found in the alcoholic section (for example mixed drinks).

The term non-alcoholic drinks often signifies drinks that would normally contain alcohol, such as beer and wine but are made with less than .5 percent alcohol by volume. The category includes drinks that have undergone an alcohol removal process such as non-alcoholic beers and de-alcoholized wines.

=== List of traditional non-alcoholic drinks ===
- Aam panna
- Aguas frescas
- Aguapanela
- Almdudler
- Apfelschorle
- Apple juice
- Atole
- Ayran
- Baesuk
- Bela Pana
- Bandrek
- Bandung
- Barley water
- Birch sap
- Blåbärssoppa
- Black tea
- Cendol
- Chalap
- Champurrado
- Champús
- Chass
- Chicha morada
- Chocolate milk
- Cholado
- Cola
- Chai
- Egg cream
- Egg nog
- Elderflower cordial
- Es bir
- Falooda
- Sugar cane juice
- Ginger ale
- Ginger beer
- Ginger tea
- Green tea
- Horchata
- Hwachae
- Jaljeera
- Jindallae hwachae
- Kefir
- Kala Khatta Jamun
- Kombucha
- Kvass
- Lassi
- Licuado
- Matcha
- Mattha
- Mazamorra
- Milk
- Milkshake
- Milo
- Mocochinchi
- Malta Goya
- Mosambi juice
- Mote con huesillo
- Nectar
- Orange drink
- Orange soft drink
- Peanut punch
- Punch
- Roasted barley tea
- Root beer
- Sarsaparilla
- Sharbat
- Shikanjvi
- Smoothie
- Subak hwachae
- Sujeonggwa
- Switchel
- Tereré
- Thadal
- Water
- Yuja hwachae

=== Plant-based ===
==== Barley ====
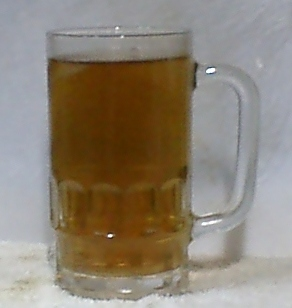
A glass mug of mugicha, a type of roasted barley tea

Barley is a member of the grass family, is a major cereal grain. It was one of the first cultivated grains and is now grown widely. Barley is used in various drinks and as a source of fermentable material for beer and certain distilled drinks. In a 2007 ranking of cereal crops in the world, barley was fourth both in terms of quantity produced (136 million tons) and in area of cultivation (566,000 square kilometres or 219,000 square miles).

- List of barley-based drinks

==== Cereal coffee ====
Cereal coffee examples:

- Buckwheat tea
- Barley tea
- Brown rice tea
- Sorghum

==== Hemp-infused drinks ====
- Hemp beer
- Hemp milk

==== Herbal tea ====
- List of herbal teas

==== Maize ====
Maize drinks

- List of maize dishes

==== Malt based ====
Malt drinks

- Milo

==== Rice ====
Rice drinks

- List of rice drinks

=== Soft drinks ===
Soft drinks – a soft drink is a drink that typically contains water (often, but not always, carbonated water), usually a sweetener and usually a flavoring agent. The sweetener may be sugar, high-fructose corn syrup, fruit juice, sugar substitutes (in the case of diet drinks) or some combination of these. Soft drinks may also contain caffeine, colorings, preservatives and other ingredients.

- Craft soda
- List of brand name soft drink products
- List of soft drink flavors
- List of soft drink producers
- List of soft drinks by country
- Lemon drinks
- List of lemonade topics
- List of national drinks

== Caffeine-containing drinks ==
Caffeinated drinks
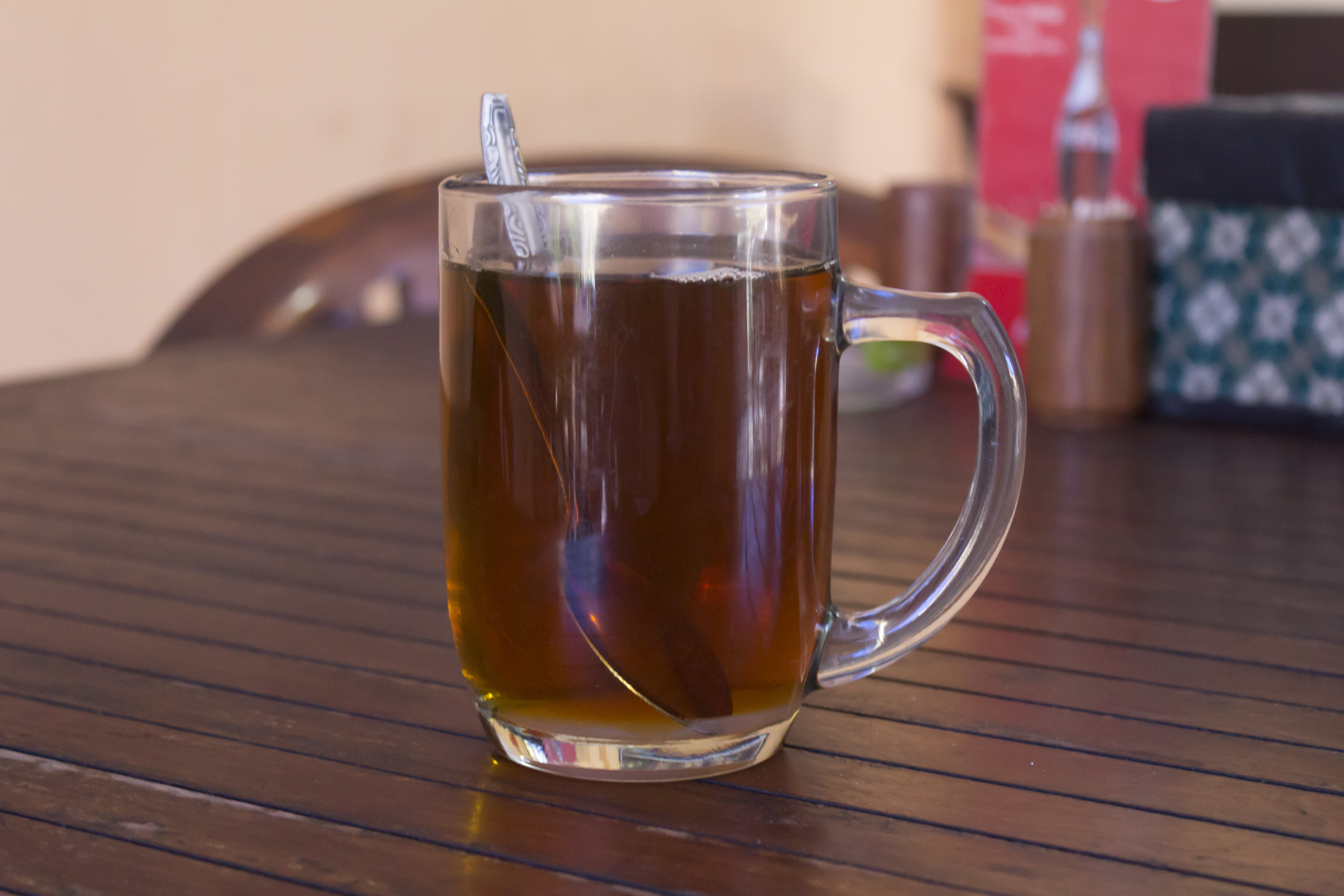
Tea is the second‑most‑consumed drink in the world, after water.

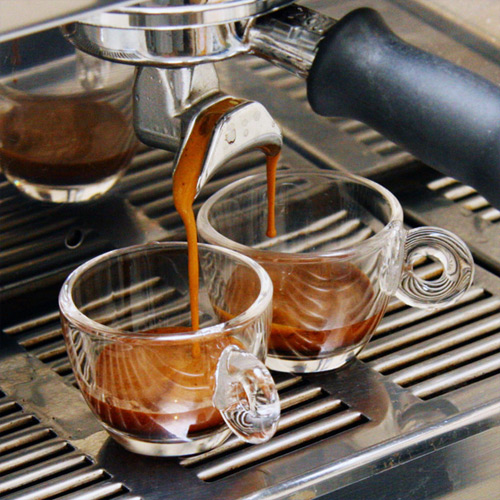
Espresso brewing, with a dark reddish-brown foam, called crema

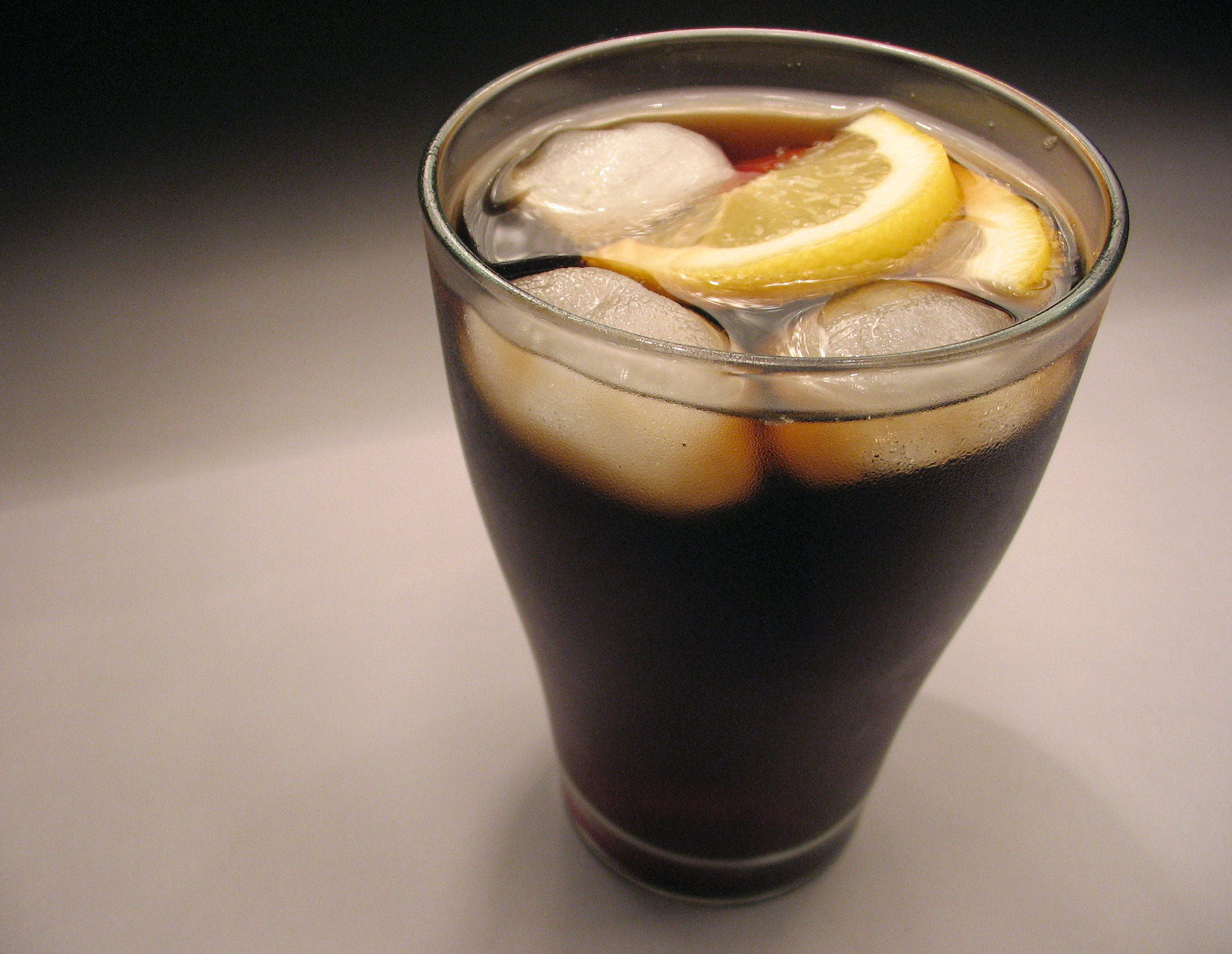
A glass of cola served with ice cubes and lemon

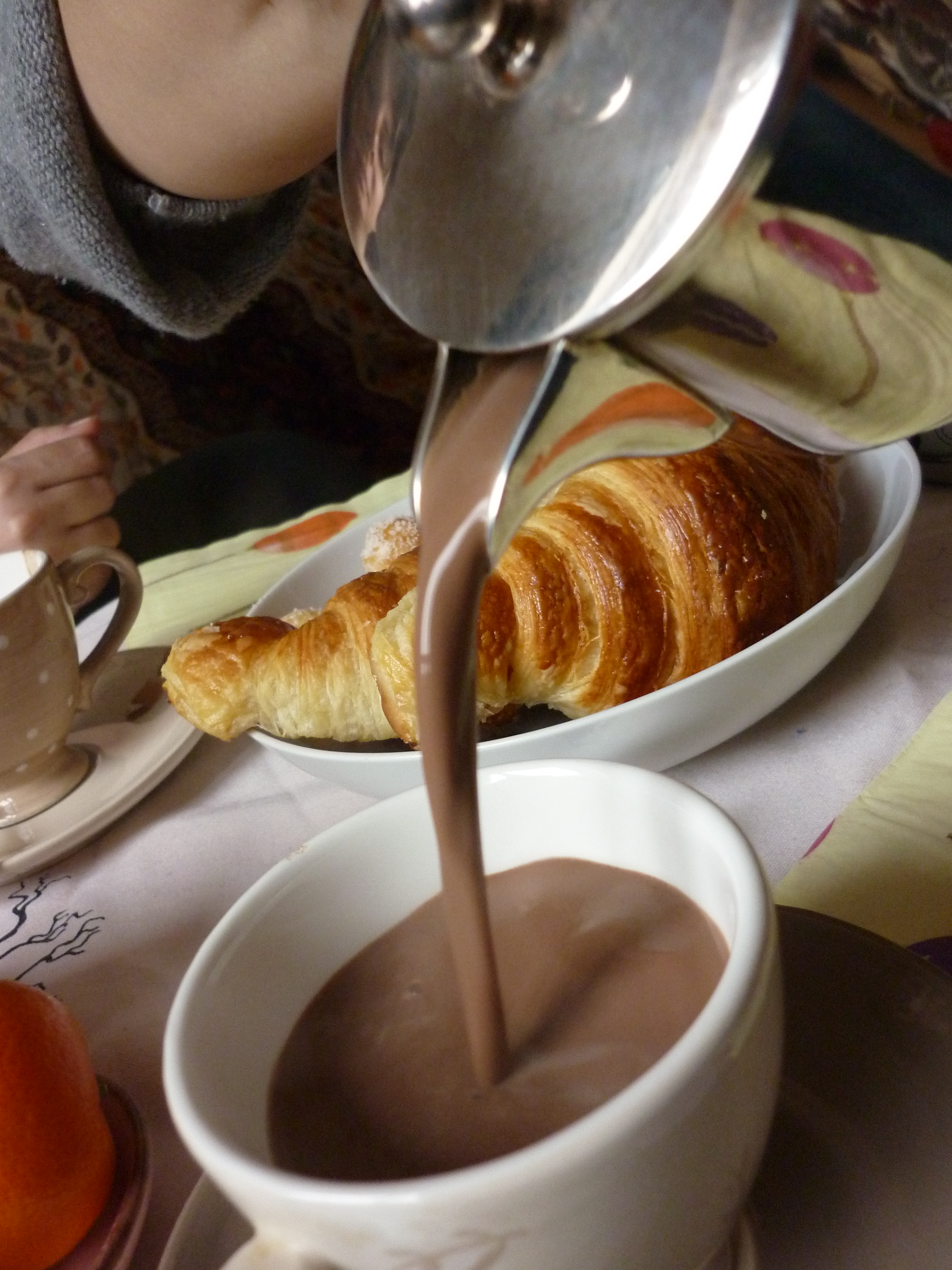
Hot chocolate served with a croissant

Caffeinated drinks – a caffeinated drink is a drink which contains caffeine, a stimulant which is legal and popular in most developed countries.

- List of coffee drinks

Notable drinks:

- Cola
- Coffee
- Energy Drink
- Tea
- Mate

=== Chocolate ===
Chocolate contains small amounts of caffeine. Chocolate is a processed, typically sweetened food produced from the seed of the tropical Theobroma cacao tree. Its earliest documented use is by the Olmecs of south central Mexico around 1100 BC. The majority of Mesoamerican people made chocolate drinks, including the Mayans and Aztecs,

- List of chocolate drinks

== Other psychoactive drinks ==
- Coca tea
- GABA tea
- Kava
- Kratom
- Labrador tea

=== Cannabis-infused drinks ===
- Bhang
- Cannabis tea
- Maltos-Cannabis
- Pabst Blue Ribbon THC-infused seltzer
- Tincture of cannabis

=== Polysubstance drinks ===
Polysubstance drinks:

- Ayahuasca
- Lean
- Polysubstance alcoholic drinks:
  - Caffeinated alcoholic drinks (list)
  - Coca wine
  - Nicotini
  - Tinctures

== Miscellaneous ==
=== Hot drinks ===
- List of hot drinks

=== By temperature ===
- Cold drinks
- Hot drinks

=== Brands and companies ===
Drink brands and companies exist worldwide. The drink industry refers to the industry that produces drinks. Drink production can vary greatly depending on the type of drink being produced. Innovations in the drinks industry, catalyzed by requests for non-alcoholic drinks, include: drinks plants, drinks processing, and drinks packing. Ready to drink packaged drinks are those sold in a prepared form, ready for consumption.

=== By country ===
- List of Bolivian drinks
- List of Brazilian drinks
- List of Chinese teas
- List of Indian beverages
- List of Indonesian beverages
- List of Italian DOC wines
- List of Italian DOCG wines
- List of Italian IGT wines
- List of Korean beverages
- List of U.S. state beverages

=== Historical ===
- Historical drinks

== See also ==
Portals

Portal:Food

Portal:Drink

Portal:Beer

Food
Drink
Beer

Portal:Wine

Portal:Liquor

Portal:Coffee

Wine
Liquor
Coffee

Portal:Agriculture and agronomy

Agriculture and agronomy

- Drinking water
- List of breakfast drinks
- List of drinking games
- List of energy drinks
- List of fictional drinks
- List of food and beverage museums
- Lists of foods
- List of lemon dishes and beverages
- List of lemonade topics
- List of microorganisms used in food and beverage preparation
- List of national drinks
- List of Korean beverages
- List of U.S. state beverages
- Temperance bar
