= List of countries by beer consumption per capita =

beer consumption per person

This is a list of countries ordered by annual per capita consumption of beer. Information not provided for some countries is not given in the available sources. The table initially ranks each country or territory by highest consumption per capita.

== Table ==
Most country links in the table connect to articles titled "Beer in (country or territory)".

Country	Consumption per capita (litres per year)	Total national consumption (Note: Combination of per capita rates with respective populations at time of study. Data taken verbatim from the Kirin report.) (million litres per year)	Year	Sources
Czech Republic	126.0	1,375	2024	
Austria	107.8	949	2019	
Romania	100.3	1,956	2019	
Germany	99.0	8,160	2019	
Poland	97.7	3,713	2019	
Namibia	95.5	248	2019	
Ireland	92.9	446	2019	
Spain	88.8	4,119	2019	
Croatia	85.5	351	2019	
Latvia	81.4	155	2019	
Estonia	80.5	105	2019	
Slovenia	80.0	168	2019	
Netherlands	79.3	1,357	2019	
Bulgaria	78.7	551	2019	
Panama	78.3	329	2019	
Slovakia	76.1	418	2019	
Australia	75.1	1,885	2019	
Lithuania	74.4	216	2019	
Hungary	73.7	715	2019	
United States	72.7	23,920	2019	
Finland	72.0	403	2019	
Mexico	70.5	9,324	2019	
United Kingdom	70.3	4,712	2019	
Bosnia and Herzegovina	68.6	240	2019	
Gabon	67.0	141	2019	
Belgium	65.9	765	2019	
New Zealand	61.0	293	2019	
South Africa	60.1	3,447	2018	
Denmark	59.8	347	2019	
Cambodia	59.2	976	2019	
Brazil	58.4	12,401	2019	
Russia	57.7	8,306	2019	
Switzerland	55.1	474	2019	
Portugal	54.9	565	2019	
DR Congo	54.8	302	2019	
Canada	53.5	1,994	2019	
Puerto Rico	54.8	203	2018	
Serbia	54.7	481	2018	
Cyprus	47.0		2021	
South Korea	39.4	2,022	2019	
Vietnam	45.1	2,600	2020/21	
Japan	38.4	4,869	2019	
Laos	41.4		2015	
France	33		2016	
Italy	31		2016	
China	29	43,266	2018	
Thailand	27		2015	
Taiwan	23.2		2015	
Hong Kong	21.2	159	2018	
Singapore	20.9		2015	
Israel	17.4		2013	
Turkey	10.9		2020	
Kenya	12			
Myanmar	11.3		2015	
Uzbekistan	11			
Papua New Guinea	10.9		2015	
Lebanon	8.5		2016	
Tanzania	8			
Uganda	6			
Malaysia	5.8		2015	
Sri Lanka	2	50		
India	2		2015	
Indonesia	0.7		2015	

== See also ==
- List of countries by alcohol consumption
