= List of beer and breweries by region =

This is a list of articles and categories dealing with beer and breweries by region: the breweries and beers in various regions. Beer is the world's most widely consumed alcoholic drink, and is the third-most popular drink overall, after water and tea. It is thought by some to be the oldest fermented drink. A brewery is a dedicated building for the making of beer, though beer can be made at home, and has been for much of beer's history. A company that makes beer is called either a brewery or a brewing company. The diversity of size in breweries is matched by the diversity of processes, degrees of automation, and kinds of beer produced in breweries. A brewery is typically divided into distinct sections, with each section reserved for one part of the brewing process.

== List ==
Region	Article	Category	Breweries	Beer brands
Africa	Beer in Africa	Beer in Africa		
Albania	Beer in Albania	Beer in Albania		Beer brands of Albania
Argentina	Beer in Argentina	Beer in Argentina		
Armenia	Beer in Armenia	Beer in Armenia	Breweries in Armenia	Beer brands of Armenia
Asia	Beer in Asia	Beer in Asia		
Australia	Beer in Australia	Beer in Australia	Breweries in Australia	Australian beer brands
Austria	Beer in Austria	Beer in Austria	Breweries in Austria	Beer brands of Austria
Azerbaijan	Beer in Azerbaijan			
Bangladesh	Beer in Bangladesh			
Belarus	Beer in Belarus	Beer in Belarus		
Belgium	Beer in Belgium	Beer in Belgium	Breweries of Belgium	Belgian beer brands
Bolivia		Beer in Bolivia		
Bosnia and Herzegovina	Beer in Bosnia and Herzegovina	Beer in Bosnia and Herzegovina		
Brazil	Beer in Brazil	Beer in Brazil	Breweries in Brazil	Beer brands of Brazil
Bulgaria	Beer in Bulgaria	Beer in Bulgaria	Breweries in Bulgaria	Beer brands of Bulgaria
Cambodia		Beer in Cambodia		
Canada	Beer in Canada	Beer in Canada	Breweries in Canada	Canadian beer brands
Cape Verde	Beer in Cape Verde			
Caribbean	Beer in the Caribbean	Beer in the Caribbean		
Central America	Beer in Central America	Beer in Central America		
Chile	Beer in Chile	Beer in Chile	Breweries in Chile	
China	Beer in China	Beer in China	Breweries in China	Chinese beer brands
Colombia	Beer in Colombia	Beer in Colombia		
Costa Rica	Beer in Costa Rica	Beer in Costa Rica		
Croatia	Beer in Croatia	Beer in Croatia	Breweries in Croatia	Beer brands of Croatia
Cyprus	Beer in Cyprus	Beer in Cyprus		
Czech Republic	Beer in Czech Republic	Beer in the Czech Republic	Breweries in the Czech Republic	Beer brands of the Czech Republic
Denmark	Beer in Denmark	Beer in Denmark	Breweries in Denmark	Beer brands of Denmark
Egypt	Beer in Egypt			
England	Beer in England	Beer in England	Breweries in England	Beer brands of England
Estonia	Beer in Estonia	Beer in Estonia	Breweries in Estonia	Beer brands of Estonia
Ethiopia	Beer in Ethiopia	Beer in Ethiopia		
Europe		Beer in Europe	Breweries of Europe	
Fiji	Beer in Fiji	Beer in Fiji	Breweries in Fiji	Beer brands in Fiji
Finland	Beer in Finland	Beer in Finland	Breweries in Finland	Beer brands of Finland
France	Beer in France	Beer in France	Breweries of France	Beer brands of France
Germany	Beer in Germany	Beer in Germany	Breweries in Germany	Beer brands of Germany
Greece	Beer in Greece	Beer in Greece	Breweries in Greece	Beer brands of Greece
Hungary	Beer in Hungary	Beer in Hungary	Breweries in Hungary	Beer brands of Hungary
Iceland	Beer in Iceland	Beer in Iceland		
India	Beer in India	Beer in India	Breweries in India	Indian beer brands
Indonesia	Beer in Indonesia	Beer in Indonesia		
Iran	Beer in Iran			
Ireland	Beer in Ireland	Beer in Ireland	Breweries in Ireland	Beer brands of Ireland
Israel	Beer in Israel	Beer in Israel	Breweries in Israel	
Italy	Beer in Italy	Beer in Italy	Breweries in Italy	Beer brands of Italy
Japan	Beer in Japan	Beer in Japan	Breweries in Japan	Beer brands of Japan
Jordan	Beer in Jordan			
Kazakhstan	Beer in Kazakhstan			
Kenya	Beer in Kenya	Beer in Kenya		
Korea	Beer in Korea	Beer in Korea		
Laos		Beer in Laos		
Latvia		Beer in Latvia	Breweries in Latvia	Beer brands of Latvia
Lebanon	Beer in Lebanon			
Lithuania	Beer in Lithuania	Beer in Lithuania	Breweries in Lithuania	Beer brands of Lithuania
Luxembourg	Beer in Luxembourg	Beer in Luxembourg	Breweries in Luxembourg	Beer brands of Luxembourg
Malaysia	Beer in Malaysia			
Malta		Beer in Malta		
Middle East		Beer in the Middle East		
Mexico	Beer in Mexico	Beer in Mexico	Breweries in Mexico	Beer brands of Mexico
Montenegro		Beer in Montenegro		
Morocco	Beer in Morocco			
Myanmar	Beer in Myanmar			
Nigeria		Beer in Nigeria	Breweries in Nigeria	
Netherlands	Beer in the Netherlands	Beer in the Netherlands	Breweries in the Netherlands	Beer brands of Netherlands
New Zealand	Beer in New Zealand	Beer in New Zealand	Breweries of New Zealand	
North America		Beer in North America		
North Korea	Beer in North Korea	Beer in North Korea		
Northern Ireland	Beer in Northern Ireland	Beer in Northern Ireland	Breweries in Northern Ireland	
Norway	Beer in Norway	Beer in Norway	Breweries in Norway	Beer brands of Norway
Oceania		Beer in Oceania		
Palestine	Beer in Palestine	Beer in Palestine		
Panama	Beer in Panama			
Peru		Beer in Peru		
Philippines	Beer in the Philippines	Beer in the Philippines	Breweries of the Philippines	
Poland	Beer in Poland	Beer in Poland	Breweries of Poland	Beer brands of Poland
Portugal	Beer in Portugal	Beer in Portugal	Breweries in Portugal	Beer brands of Portugal
Romania	Beer in Romania	Beer in Romania	Breweries in Romania	Beer brands of Romania
Russia	Beer in Russia	Beer in Russia		
Scotland	Beer in Scotland	Beer in Scotland	Breweries in Scotland	Beer brands of Scotland
Serbia	Beer in Serbia	Beer in Serbia	Breweries of Serbia	Beer brands of Serbia
Singapore	Beer in Singapore	Beer in Singapore		
Slovakia	Beer in Slovakia	Beer in Slovakia	Breweries in Slovakia	Beer brands of Slovakia
Slovenia	Beer in Slovenia	Beer in Slovenia	Breweries in Slovenia	Beer brands of Slovenia
South Africa	Beer in South Africa	Beer in South Africa	Breweries of South Africa	
South America		Beer in South America		
South Korea	Beer in South Korea	Beer in South Korea		
Spain		Beer in Spain	Breweries in Spain	Beer brands of Spain
Sri Lanka	Beer in Sri Lanka	Beer in Sri Lanka		
Sweden	Beer in Sweden	Beer in Sweden	Breweries in Sweden	Beer brands of Sweden
Switzerland	Beer in Switzerland	Beer in Switzerland	Breweries in Switzerland	Beer brands of Switzerland
Syria	Beer in Syria			
Taiwan	Beer in Taiwan	Beer in Taiwan		
Tanzania	Beer in Tanzania	Beer in Tanzania		
Thailand	Beer in Thailand	Beer in Thailand		
Tibet	Beer in Tibet			
Turkey	Beer in Turkey	Beer in Turkey		
Ukraine	Beer in Ukraine	Beer in Ukraine	Breweries in Ukraine	Beer brands of Ukraine
United Kingdom	Beer in the United Kingdom	Beer in the United Kingdom	Breweries in the United Kingdom	Beer brands of the United Kingdom
United States	Beer in the United States	Beer in the United States	Breweries in the United States	American beer brands
Venezuela	Beer in Venezuela	Beer in Venezuela		
Vietnam	Beer in Vietnam	Beer in Vietnam		
Wales	Beer in Wales	Beer in Wales	Breweries in Wales	

== Africa ==
=== Botswana ===
- Kgalagadi Breweries Limited

== Asia ==
=== Armenia ===
Beer has been brewed by Armenians since ancient times. One of the first confirmed written evidences of ancient beer production is Xenophon's reference to "wine made from barley" in one of the ancient Armenia villages, as described in his 5th century B.C. work Anabasis: "There were stores within of wheat and barley and vegetables, and wine made from barley in great big bowls; the grains of barley malt lay floating in the drink up to the lip of the vessel, and reeds lay in them, some longer, some shorter, without joints; when you were thirsty you must take one of these into your mouth, and suck. The drink without admixture of water was very strong, and of a delicious flavour to certain palates, but the taste must be acquired."

Currently there are six local brewing companies throughout the country producing a variety of beer types:

- Beer of Yerevan Brewery in Yerevan: around 15 types of beer are served by the brewery, mainly under the brand Kilikia (named after a historic Armenian kingdom at the Mediterranean coast) as well as some other brands.
- Gyumri Beer Brewery in Gyumri: the company produces a variety of lager beer under 3 brands: Gyumri, Aleksandrapol and Ararat.
- Kotayk Brewery in Abovyan: a variety of lager beer under the brand Kotayk (named after the Armenian Kotayk Province), as well as Erebuni and Urartu.
- Lihnitis Sevan Brewery in Sevan: the company produces the Kellers beer.
- Hayasy Group in Voskevaz village, Aragatsotn Province: currently producing under the brand Hayasy.
- Dilijan Brewery in Dilijan: producing under the brand Dilijan.

In addition to brewing factories, the country is also home to 8 microbreweries/brewpubs, that produce and serve draught/unfiltered beer in Armenia.

=== Myanmar ===
The dominant brewery in Myanmar, with an approximately 80% share of the market, is Myanmar Brewery, which is 45% owned by Union of Myanmar Economic Holdings Limited. Myanmar Brewery's beers include Myanmar Beer, Double Strong Beer, Andaman Gold (Red) and Andaman Gold (Blue). In 2015 Myanmar Brewery entered into a joint venture with Kirin Brewery to produce and distribute its beers in the country. In 2013 the Carlsberg Group signed an agreement with Myanmar Golden Star, establishing Myanmar Carlsberg Company Ltd. Myanmar Carlsberg Company opened a $75 million brewery in May 2015 which now produces Carlsberg and Turborg locally, together with a new beer, Yoma. In July 2015 Heineken International opened a $60 million brewery in Yangon, in a joint venture with a local company, Alliance Brewery Company. The brewery produces Tiger, Heineken, ABC stout and a new rice beer, Regal Seven.

=== North Korea ===
North Korea has at least ten major breweries and many microbreweries that supply a wide range of beer products. The top brand is the light lager Taedonggang which is internationally known for its quality.

The country's problems with goods distribution and power output has forced North Korean brewers to innovate. To minimize distribution, many restaurants and hotels maintain their own microbreweries. Because unreliable power supply makes it difficult to refrigerate beer, North Koreans have developed their own steam beer, an originally American beer style brewed in higher than normal temperatures, that is widely available.

Although the Korean liquor soju is preferred, beer comes second when it comes to consumption. Since the 1980s, beer has been within reach of ordinary North Koreans, though it is still rationed. Tourists, on the other hand, enjoy inexpensive beer without such limitations.

== Europe ==
Europe's largest single brewery and single malting facility in terms of installed capacity currently are the Obolon CJSC's production facility in Kyiv, Ukraine, and malting facility in Chemerivtsi, Khmelnytskyi Oblast, Ukraine, respectively

=== Albania ===
The best known beer in Albania is Birra Tirana. Also well-known beer brands are Birra Korça, Birra Kaon, Birra Puka and Birra Stela.

=== Latvia ===
Beer is a historic tradition in Latvia and is known to have been made before the Northern Crusades in the 13th century. Today, the most popular brand in Latvia is Aldaris (based in Riga).

=== Lithuania ===
This Baltic state has a major beer scene in the northern part of the country, centred around the towns of Pasvalys, Pakruojis, Kupiškis and Biržai. The farmhouse brews of the region are highly distinctive, using local ingredients and techniques from pre-Soviet times.

The biggest commercial breweries are located in towns Utena (Utenos alus'), Panevėžys (Kalnapilis), Klaipėda (Švyturys), Kaunas (Ragutis) and Vilnius (Tauras).

=== North Macedonia ===
The best-known beer in North Macedonia is Skopsko. There are also Silver Moon, Zlaten Dab, Bitolsko, Gorsko etc.

=== Norway ===
In addition to the major breweries that mostly brew pilsner beer, there are a number of microbreweries brewing a variety of other types of beer.

=== Slovakia ===
The most famous brands in Slovakia are Šariš, Smädný mních (Thirsty Monk) and Zlatý Bažant (Golden pheasant).

There are 15 breweries in Slovakia:

- Pivovar Bytča (K. K. Company) - Martiner, Popper, Palatín
- Pivovar Corgoň (Heineken Slovensko a.s.) - Corgoň, Maurus, Stup
- Pivovar a sladovňa Gemer a.s. (Heineken Slovensko a.s.) - Gemer, Zuzana
- Pivovar Horden (Esperia a.s.) - Horden
- Pivovar Hurbanovo (Heineken Slovensko a.s.) - Zlatý Bažant, Heineken
- Pivovar Ilava (K. K. Company) - Richtár, Vartáš
- Pivovar Martiner (Heineken Slovensko a.s.) - Martiner, Martinský zdroj
- Minipivovar M.K. Unipol Trnava
- Steiger (Eduard Rada s.r.o.) - Steiger, Sitňan, Hell, Kachelmann
- Pivovar Stein a.s. - Stein, Pressburger, Premium Pils, Dominik
- Minipivovar Svätý Jur

=== Spain ===
Some known Spanish beers are Mahou-San Miguel (known as Mahou before the acquisition by San Miguel company), Estrella Damm, Alhambra, Estrella Galicia, Estrella Levante, Cruzcampo, Reina, Dorada and La Zaragozana (Ambar).

== North America ==
=== Mexico ===
Beer in Mexico has a long history. Mesoamerican cultures knew of fermented alcoholic drinks, including a corn beer. Only two corporations, Grupo Modelo (owned by Anheuser-Busch InBev) and FEMSA (owned by Heineken International) control the majority of the Mexican beer market. Beer is a major export for the country, with most going to the United States, but is available in over 150 countries.

== South America ==
=== Argentina ===
The predominant brewery in Argentina is AB InBev with a 65% of the market, with brands such as Quilmes, Brahma, Budweiser, Corona and Stella Artois. The second largest brewery is Compañía de las Cervecerías Unidas with a 33% share, which produces Heineken, Schneider, Imperial and Isenbeck. The best selling brands are Brahma, Quilmes, Schneider and Imperial.

=== Colombia ===
With almost 90% of the Colombia market, Bavaria is the most popular Colombian beer.

=== Peru ===
The consumption per capita in Peru is 22 liters per year.

Three local producers are: Sab Miller, with the local brands: Cusqueña, Cristal, Pilsen, Arequipeña and the Honduran but local-made Barena; AmBev, with the Brazilian, but also local made, Brahma; Ajeper, with the all new Franca. This is a Peruvian company.

Also, there is a selection of imported beers such as Erdinger and Flensburger from Germany, Strong Suffolk and Abbot from the UK, Corona from Mexico, Heineken from the Netherlands, Sapporo from Japan, Stella Artois (the Belgian brand, but made in Argentina), Quilmes also from Argentina, etc.

There are also small local producers of standard beer and many producers of the ancient beer named Chicha, normally made of a local corn named Jora in the traditional "Chicherías".

== Beer consumption per capita ==
Beer consumption per capita by country (2009). Measurements are shown in litres.

== See also ==
- List of countries by alcohol consumption
- List of microbreweries
- List of national drinks
- Alcohol belts of Europe – Beer belt
