= Beer in Venezuela =

Beer is a widely consumed beverage in Venezuela. The country produces several local beers and beer-related products, which are a significant part of Venezuelan social and cultural life. According to The Wall Street Journal, Polar beer was shut down in April 2016 as the Venezuelan government restriction shortened the supply of malted barley necessary to produce beer.

== History ==
Beer production in Venezuela started in 1843 with Cerveza Tovar. Many years later in 1925 Cerveza Zulia opens its first industrial plant and quickly became the most popular beer. Before that date, beers were imported from Brazil (particularly Brahma) and Europe (Heineken and others).

In 1941, Cervecería Polar, C.A. introduced the Cerveza Polar, a Pilsener type beer. The company went on to introduce several other brands of beer of various strengths, as well as a non-alcoholic malt beverage called Maltin Polar, marketed at children and with a flavour similar to root beer. More recent years have seen the introduction of light beers such as Polar Light and Solera Light, and a low-alcohol beer called Polar Zero (0.1% ABV).

== Economy ==
There is not a very high competition in the beer industry because most beers present in Venezuela are already too popular with the public and most of the competition is between Polar and Regional beers, with people preferring one brand even limiting themselves to drink beer from the other as some kind for honor, though Polar beers are more popular than Regional beers and with the Zulia beer entering the market again with some success. Beer consumption per capita in Venezuela, is the highest in Latin America with 90 liters in 2007; and 95,45 liters in 2009. According to a study conducted in 2016 amongst people aged 15 and older, Venezuelan alcohol consumption is split up in 69% of beer, 29% of spirits and 2% of other alcoholic beverages.

== See also ==
- Beer and breweries by region
- Beer
- Venezuela
