= Beer in Azerbaijan =

Beer in Azerbaijan is typified by lighter lagers. Of the domestically produced beers, the most widely distributed is Xirdalan named after the city of Xırdalan in Azerbaijan, formerly brewed by Baki-Castel (BGI) but bought by the Carlsberg Group n 2008. In February 2017 the company was renamed to Carlsberg Azerbaijan. As a sponsor of Baku's Eurovision Song Contest, Xirdalan issued special commemorative Eurovision cans and bottles in 2012. Other widespread, locally produced brands include Novxanı, NZS, Afsana and Annenfeld. Beer popularity continues to grow in Azerbaijan as of 2018 and there are plans to fully localize malt processing for beer production, with a new malt processing plant being planned to be launched in 2024. Unlike almost all CIS countries, the beer bottles in Azerbaijan are marked with an excise duty sticker.

== See also ==
- Azerbaijani cuisine
- Azerbaijani wine
- Beer and breweries by region
