= Beer in Tibet =

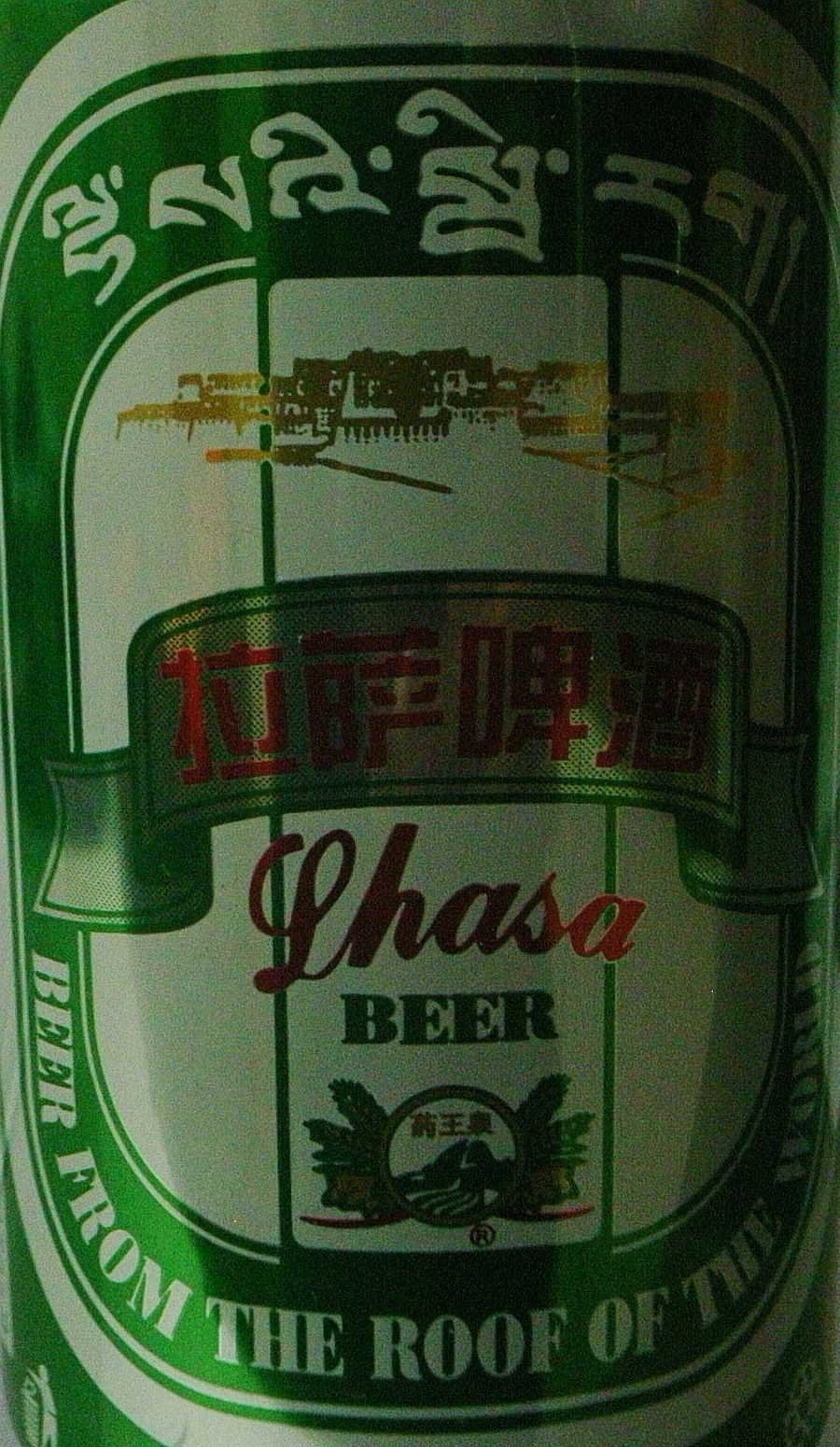
Lhasa Beer, the only Tibetan beer on the world market

The production of beer in Tibet is a relatively recent phenomenon in Tibetan cuisine. The Chinese established the Lhasa Brewery Company in 1988, which is located in Lhasa.

== History ==
The first historical record of beer in Tibet are Chinese, concerning a 638 peace agreement between Tang China and the new Tibetan kingdom of Songtsen Gampo include the technological transfers of silk, paper, watermill and beer production. Tang Taizong did not respect the agreement on these technical transfer, but his son, Tang Gaozong, did.

However, somewhat contradicting the fact that alcohol is contrary to the beliefs of Tibetan Buddhism, is the fact that for centuries, chhaang, a local brew of barley sold by glass at street stalls in Lhasa and across towns in Tibet has been consumed by many Tibetans and monks.

In July 2023, the Tibet Shengbang Holding Co., Ltd. with an annual output of 300,000 tons of beer construction project was held in Lhasa Economic and Technological Development Zone, and the project has entered into the substantive construction stage.

== See also ==
- Beer and breweries by region
- Chhaang, a traditional Tibetan and Nepalese beer
- List of Tibetan dishes

== Sources ==
- Twitchett, Denis C.; Fairbank (Hrsg.), John K. (1979). The Cambridge History of China : Sui and T'ang China, 589–906, vol. 3. Cambridge: Cambridge University Press. p. 900. ISBN 0-521-21446-7.
