= Beer in Argentina =

The annual consumption of beer in Argentina is about 33 litres per person.

== German Argentines ==
There had been German immigrants in Argentina, since before 1871, but a change of immigration policies along the Volga and the imposition of military service caused a mass exodus of ethnic Germans to Catholic Argentina. In the 1881 census they were the fourth largest ethnic group in the country. There was money to be made from land purchase and parcelling, and the families were expecting home comforts. All the early breweries had owners with ethnic German names.

== Breweries in Argentina ==
The predominant brewery in Argentina is AB InBev with a 65% of the market, with brands such as Quilmes, Brahma, Budweiser, Corona and Stella Artois. The second largest brewery is Compañía de las Cervecerías Unidas with a 33% share, which produces Heineken, Schneider, Imperial and Isenbeck. The best selling brands are Brahma, Quilmes, Schneider and Imperial.

=== Cerverceria Bieckert ===
This was the first beer to be brewed in Argentina. Emilio Bieckert (1837-1913) was of Alsatian origin, the border region between Germany and France, both countries with a strong beer tradition. Photographic evidence shows he was selling Bock beer, a strong beer developed by the monasteries in Bavaria, and Pilsner a lighter beer of Czech origin. Pilsner needs low temperatures to ferment correctly. A few years earlier Bieckert had opened the first ice manufacturing plant in the country.

Compañía de las Cervecerías Unidas bought the brewery in 2008.

=== Cervecería y Maltería Quilmes ===
Quilmes is an Argentine brewery founded in 1888 in Quilmes, Buenos Aires Province, by Otto Bemberg, a German immigrant in the early 1880s. By the 1920s it was the iconic Argentinian beer. Quilmes was the largest beer maker in Argentina in 1993.

In 2002, Brazilian company Ambev bought 37.5% of Quilmes. Later, Ambev became part of InBev and eventually Anheuser-Busch InBev.

=== Craft breweries ===
There has been a considerable boom in microbrewing in Argentina since the start of the 21st century. As of 2019, there were 4,000 microbreweries in Argentina. Some of the most notable Argentine craft breweries have their roots in the wave of German and Swiss immigration to the southern provinces of Río Negro and Neuquén in the late 19th and early 20th centuries. The city of Bariloche is a particular hotspot for craft brewing.

- Cervecería Manush – Bariloche
- Kunstmann – Bariloche
- Berlina – Bariloche
- Cervecería Bachmann – Bariloche
- Cervecería Blest – Bariloche
- Brauer Cervecería – Neuquén
- Cervecería Owe – Neuquén
- Buller Brewing Company – Buenos Aires
- Breoghan Cervecería – Buenos Aires
- Antares – Mar del Plata
- Aldea – Ciudad Autónoma de Buenos Aires

== Gallery ==
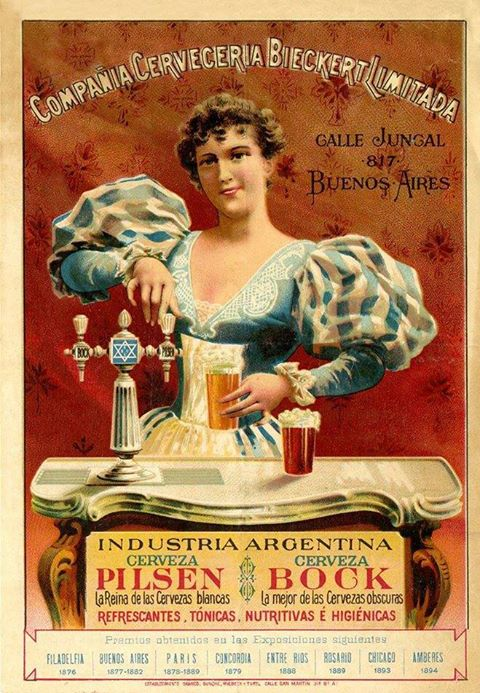
Bieckert aviso

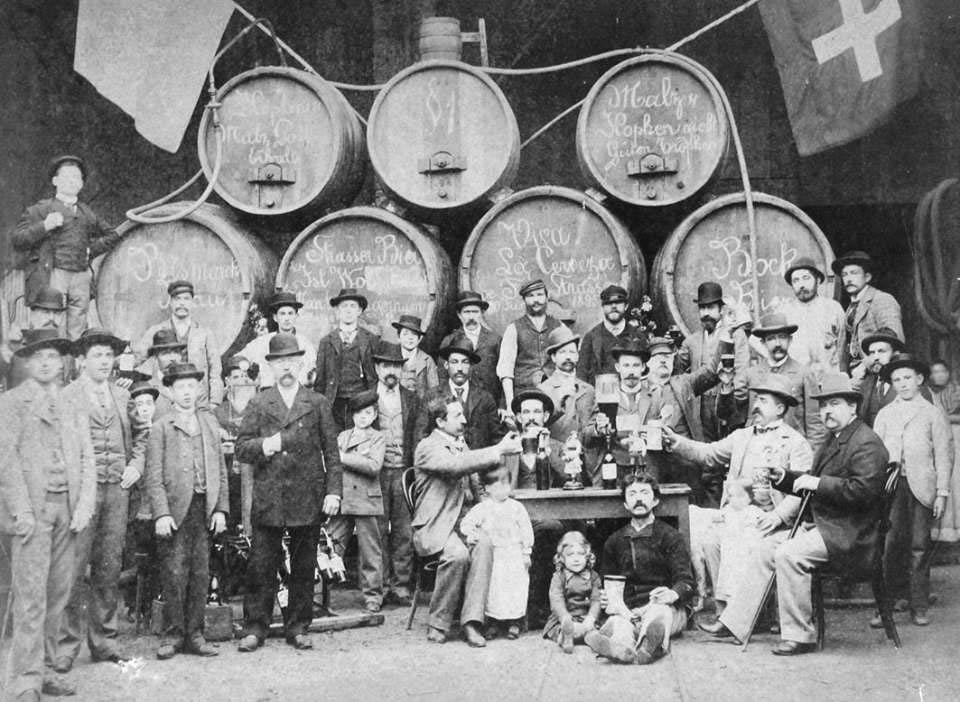
Cerveceria Strasser Rosario 1885

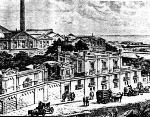
The first commercial brewery in Argentina was started by Baron Bieckert in Villa Adelina

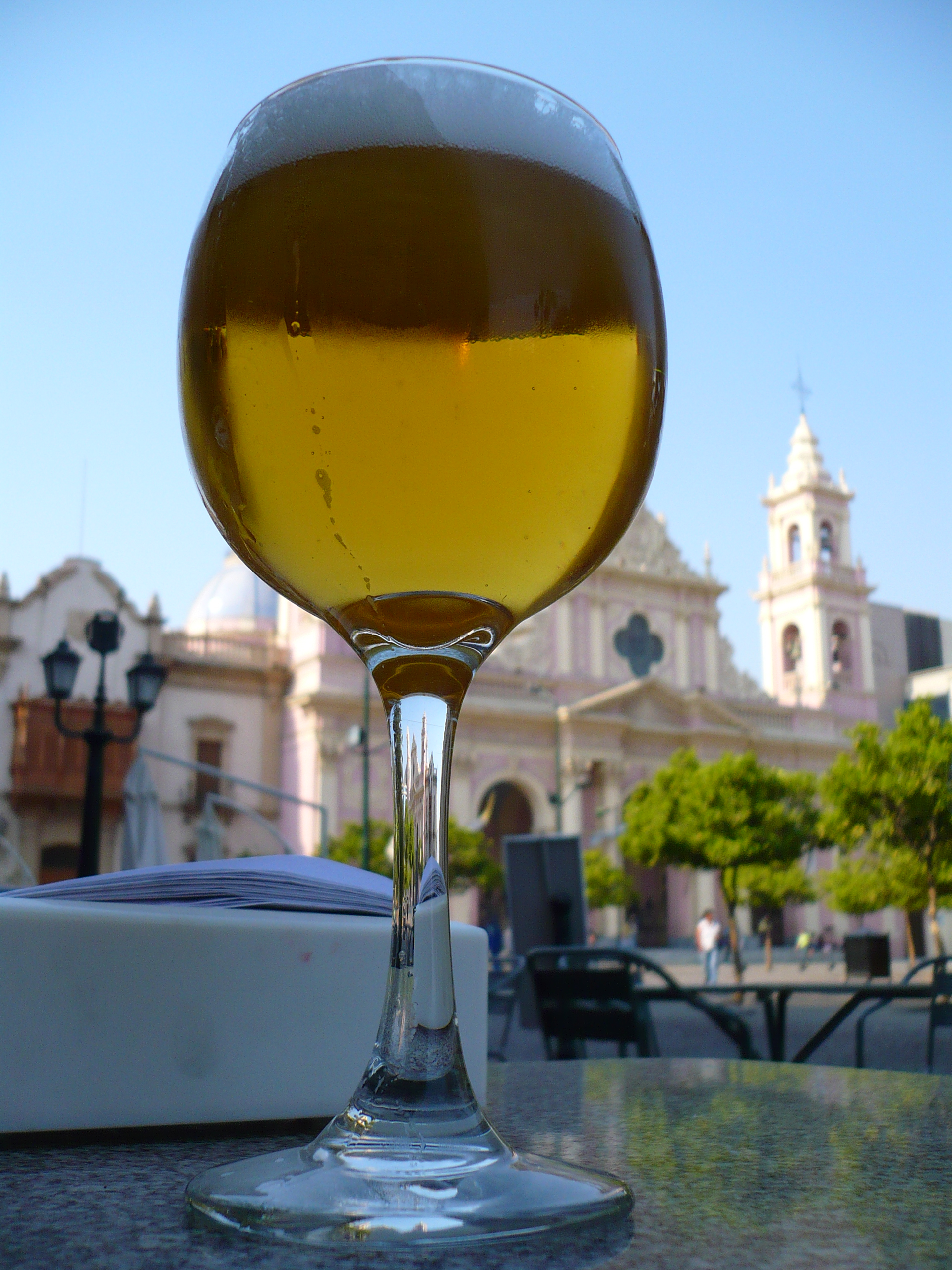
A beer in Salta – an Argentine city in the Andean foothills
