= Beer in Belarus =

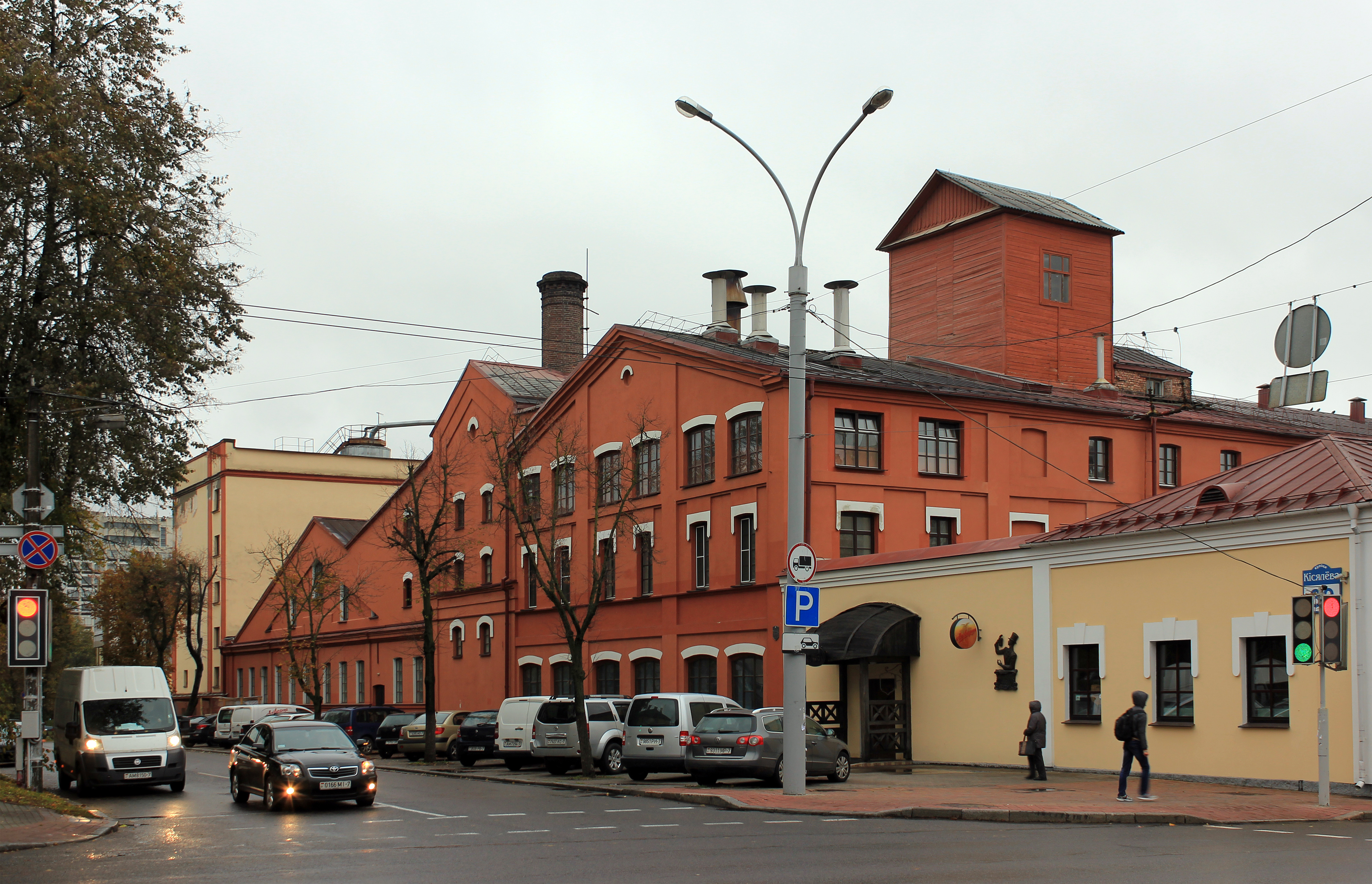
Alivaria Brewery, Minsk

In 2020, beer production in Belarus was 43.01 million decalitres (about 4.30 million hl), a 6% decline from 2019.

A local peculiarity of the Belarusian beer market is a large share of beer in PET and considerable amount of imported production (about 20% of the market). The largest producer is the state-owned company Krinitsa, which holds about 30% of the Belarusian beer market, down from a 38% share of national beer production in 2008. Other beer companies with strong market shares include Alivaria (Carlsberg Group), Syabar and Rechitsapivo (Heineken International), Lidskoe Pivo (Olvi) and the state-owned company Brestskoe Pivo.

The only producer of brewing malt in the country is Belsolod.

== Major beers in Belarus ==
- Alivaryia (Carlsberg Group)
- Bobrov (Heineken International)
- Brovar (Carlsberg Group)
- Desyatka (Carlsberg Group)
- Dvinsky Brovar
- Lidskae (Olvi)
- Rechitskoe (Heineken International)
- Tema (Olvi)

== See also ==
- Beer and breweries by region
