= Beer in Colombia =

Beer in Colombia is a sizeable industry ranging from small local micro-brews to large scale productions of popular brands. It is estimated that Colombia has more than 15 large national brands (the most popular listed below); but dozens of small/local microbrewery boutique beers are growing beyond regional demand.

== List of Colombian beers ==
=== BBC Bogotá Beer Company ===
- Candelaria clásica
- Monserrate Roja
- Chapinero Porter
- Usaquén Stout
- Chía Weiss

=== Cervecería Bavaria ===
- Águila
- Águila light
- Águila Cero (non alcoholic)
- Aguila Imperial (seasonal)
- Pilsen
- Poker
- Poker Ligera
- Redd's
- Casa Suárez
- Costeña
- Costeñita
- Club Colombia Dorada (blonde), Roja (red), Negra (black)
- Cola & Pola (refajo)

– Source:

=== Cerveza 3 Cordilleras ===
- Rose
- Blanca (American Wheat)
- 6.47
- Mestiza (American Pale Ale)
- Negra (Stout)
- Mulata (Amber Ale)

– Source:

=== Cerveza Ancla ===
- Cerveza Ancla Super Premium, is a Lager/Pilsner style beer, brewed under "Reinheitsgebot" the German beer purity law.

– Source:

=== Cerveza Casa Suárez ===
- Rubia

– Source:

=== Cerveza Colón ===
- Colón Negra
- Colón Rubia
- Colón Roja
- Colón Light

– Source:

=== Cerveza San Tomás ===
- San Tomás
- Hefe Weizen
- Märzen
- Dubbel
- Bock

– Source:

=== Lino Brewing Company S.A.S. ===
- COLPA - Colombian Pale Ale
- COLAA - Colombian Amber Ale
- COLS - Colombian Stout

=== Menestral Brewing Co. ===
- Caficultor - English Porter
- Carpintero - American Brown Ale
- Herrero - Red Ale
- Compositor - Golden Ale
- Silletero - India Red Ale
- Meisterkünstler - Hefeweizen
- Moulin Rouge - Fruit Beer
- 味の神 (Aji no Kami) - Japanese Lager

see more.

== See also ==
- Beer and breweries by region
