= Beer in Malaysia =

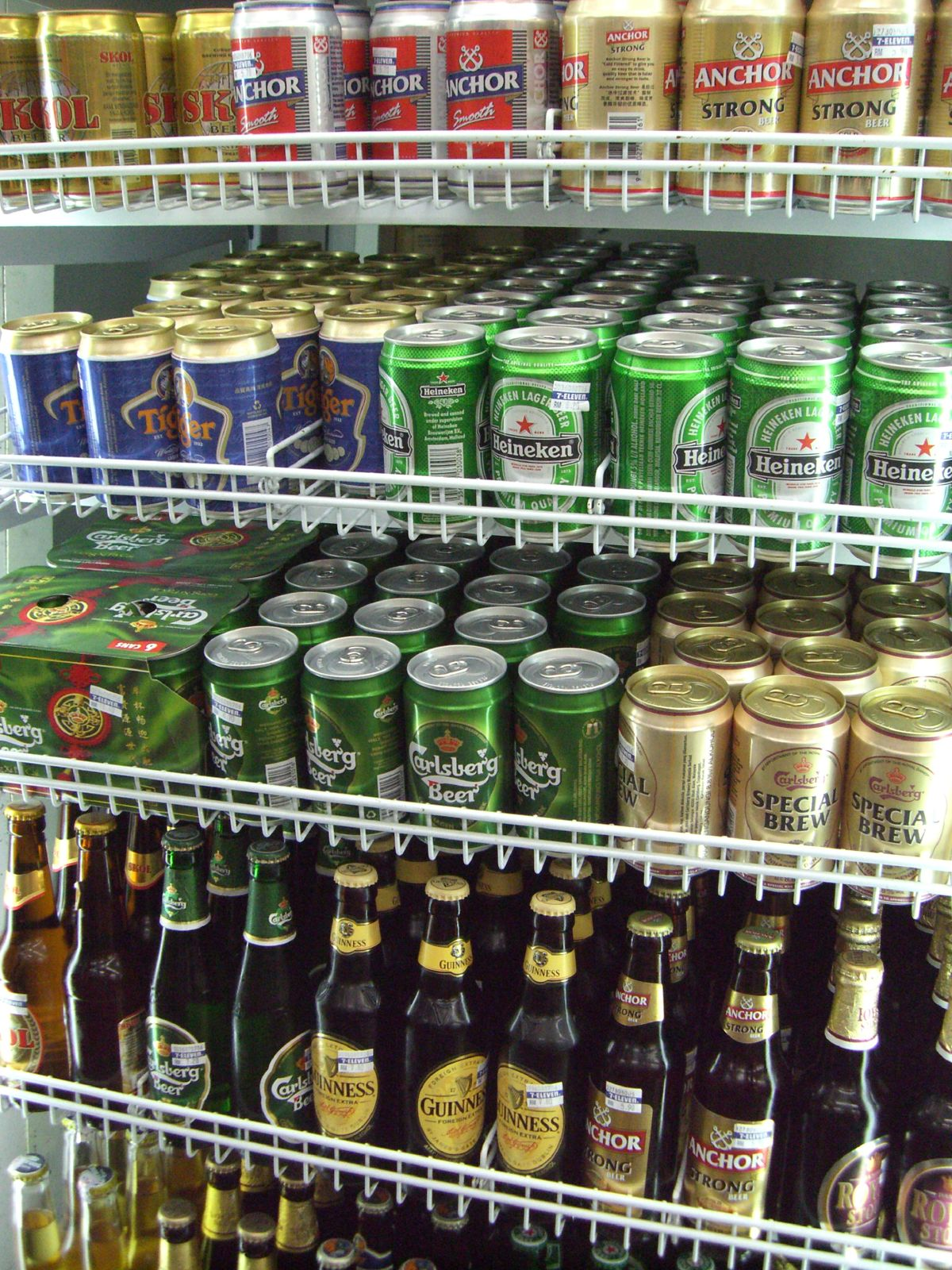
Canned and bottle beer in 7-Eleven market in Malaysia.

Beer production in Malaysia has been commonplace since 1933 with the introduction of Anchor Beer.

Years later, two leading breweries, Guinness and Malayan Breweries, merged to form a new company known as Guinness Anchor Berhad. Previously, the distribution of beer in Malaysia is mainly distributed by Malayan Breweries Limited which is centred in neighbouring Singapore. Carlsberg established its second brewery outside Kuala Lumpur in 1970.

Anchor beer was originally owned by the Archipelago Brewing Company before being acquired by Malayan Breweries Ltd in 1941. Malayan Breweries later merged with Guinness to form Guinness Anchor Berhad in 1989, which was eventually renamed Heineken Malaysia Berhad in 2016.

By 2007, one local brewery began to establish their presence in the country although the demands for commercial beers are much higher than a new local brand. Most beers in the Malaysian markets are imported from neighbouring countries such as Singapore, Thailand, Indonesia, Philippines and Vietnam. In 2022, Malaysia had its very own craft beer brand known as PaperKite. PaperKite is also the first Malaysian craft beer brand to win the World Beer Awards in 2023.

== Regulation ==
As Malaysia is a Muslim majority country like its neighbours of Brunei and Indonesia, Muslim consumers are prohibited from buying and drinking alcohol related drinks including beer. Any Muslims caught drinking alcohol in public places especially in West Malaysia will be caned and fined.

However, no canings have been conducted since 2010 as the punishment has been replaced with a three-week community service at a children's home.

== See also ==
- Alcohol in Malaysia
- Beer and breweries by region
