= Beer in Syria =

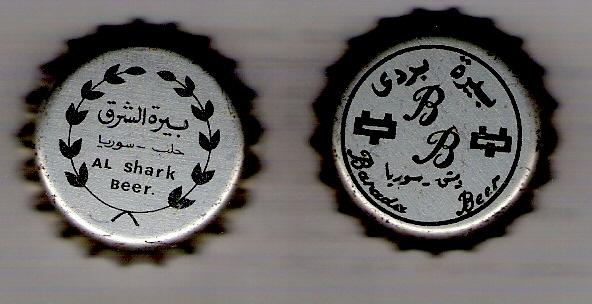
Bottle caps of Al-Shark (Al-Sharq) and Barada beer, manufactured in Shumen, Bulgaria in 1988

The earliest evidence of beer in Syria came from the Ebla tablets, discovered in 1974 in Ebla and presumed to go back to 2500 BC, reveal that the city produced a variety of beers, including one that appears to have been named after the city "Ebla".

In modern Syria, the production and distribution of beer was controlled by the government, and most widely sold to tourists through the army's Military Social Establishment supermarket chain and through mini markets in city centres. Production of the country's two local brands, al-Shark (from Aleppo) and Barada (from Damascus) was halted in 2011 due to the outbreak of civil war. A brewery known as Afamia was opened in 2010 in Adra near Damascus. By the end of 2017, the Arados brewery was opened in the town of Safita in Tartus Governorate.

Beers imported from Lebanon are not very common, although brands such as Almaza, Tuborg, Beirut and Efes are popular.

== Beer brands and brewing companies ==
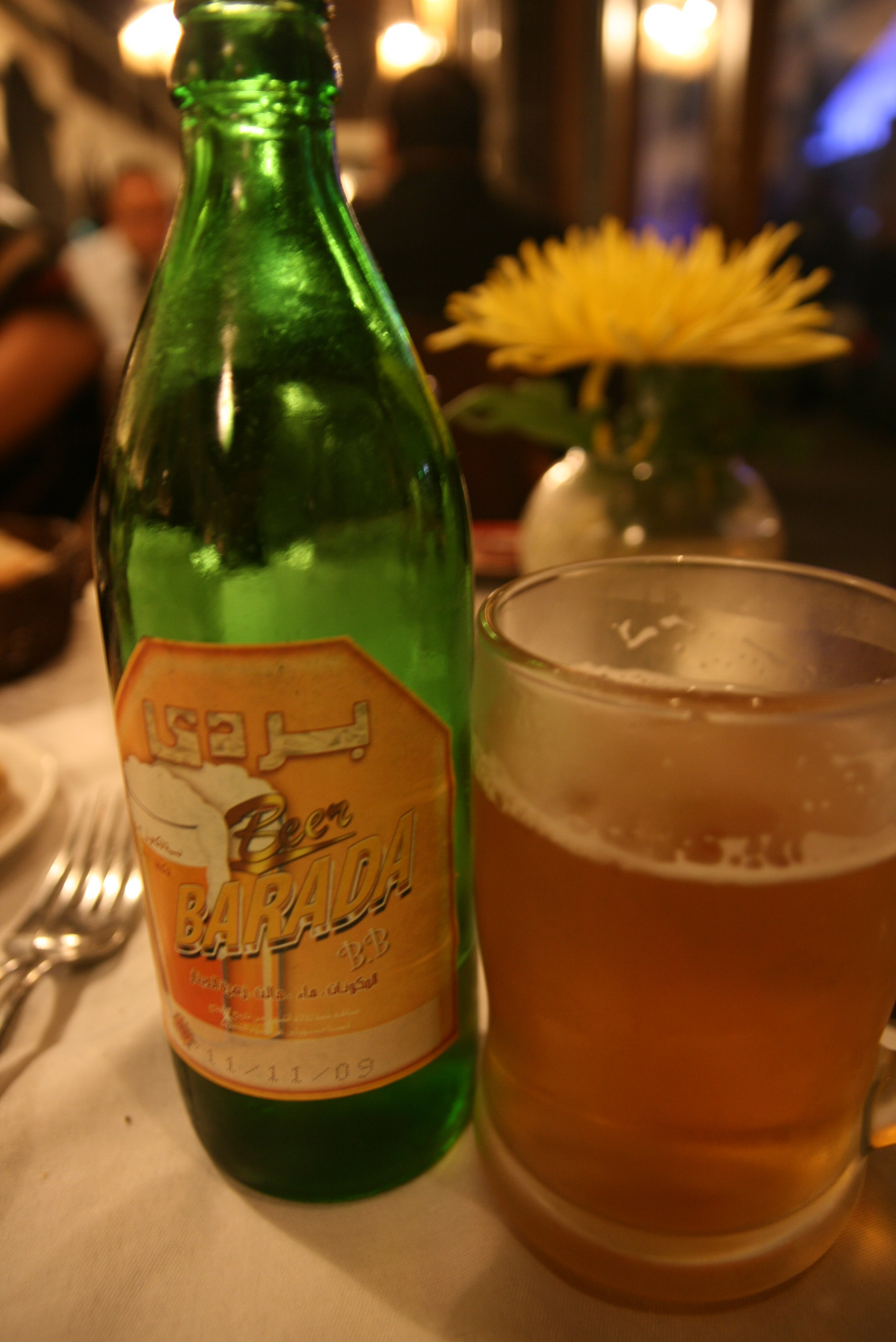
Barada beer

- Al-Shark Beer, (or al-Chark) was a product of the state-owned Al-Shark Company for Food Stuff Products in Aleppo. It was founded in 1954 and fully owned by the government of Syria. It was a pale lager beer, slightly higher in alcohol (3.7%) and with a higher rating than Barada beer, and it had a medium malt body.
- Barada Beer, was a product of the state-owned Barada Beer Company in Damascus. It was founded in 1977 and fully owned by the government of Syria. It was a pale lager beer with the quality of bottling being highly variable and frequently poor. It had 3.4% alcohol, a yellowish hazy color and a light body. Government produced Barada was notorious for its poor quality and stale taste.
- Arados Beer, launched in 2017 by the Arados brewing factory in Safita, Tartus Governorate, with the help of experts from the Czech Republic. It is the latest company for beer production in Syria, with an investment of US$16 million, and with plans to produce 15 million liters per year. Arados brewery of Safita represents the first mass-produced domestic beer since production of al-Shark and Barada ceased, following the outbreak of the civil war in Syria.

== See also ==
- Beer and breweries by region
