= Beer in Kazakhstan =

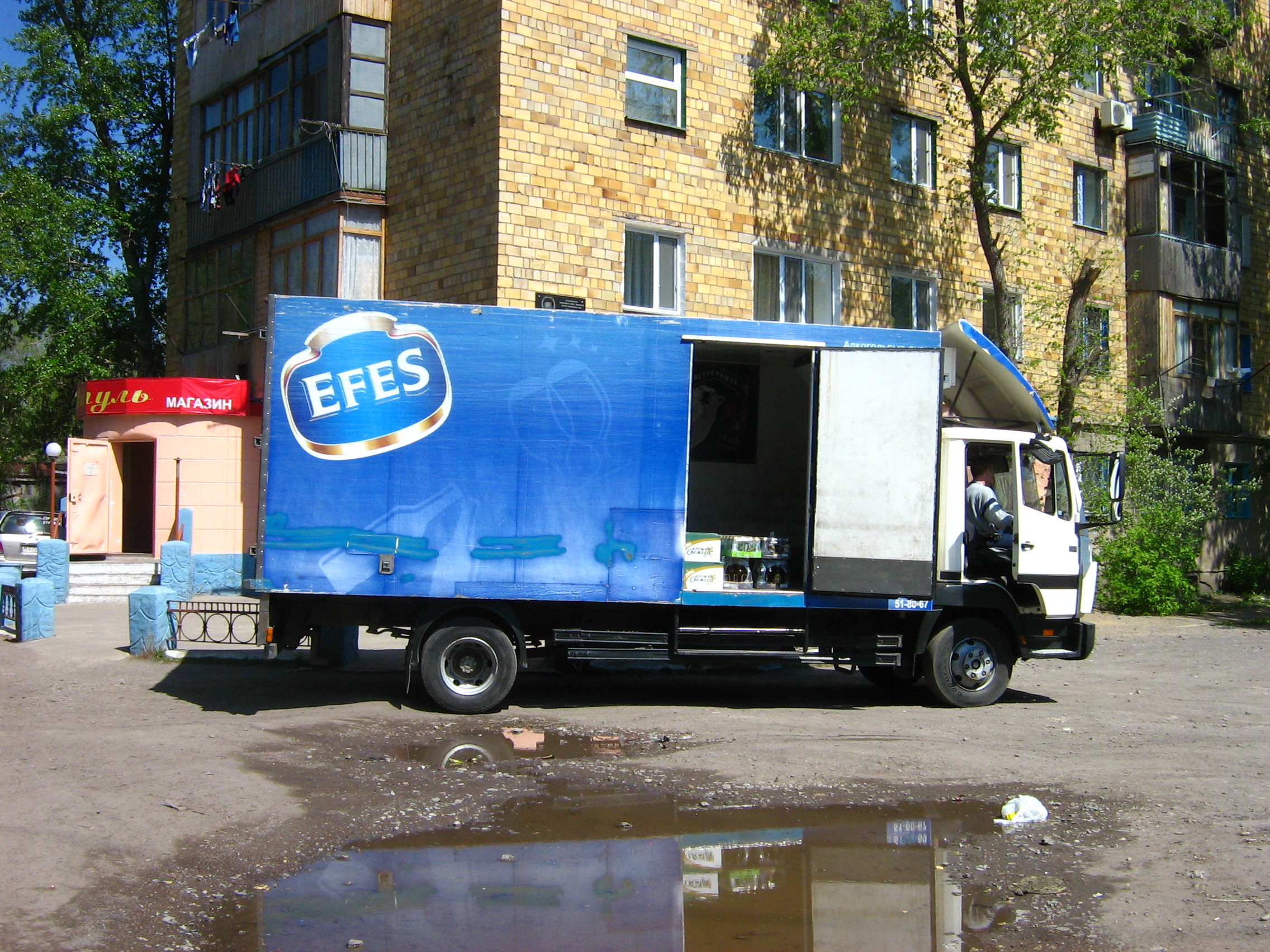
A truck delivering beer from the Efes Brewery in Karaganda, Kazakhstan

Beer in Kazakhstan is dominated by local and Russian beer brands. Large breweries are owned by international groups Efes Beverage Group (in cities Karaganda and Almaty) and Carlsberg Group (Almaty city) as well as by a private company Shymkentpivo (Shymkent city). In 2008, beer production in Kazakhstan fell by 12% to 3.60 mln hl, whereas the official import grew by 1% to 1.30 mln hl.

In 2008, each third bottle of beer sold in Kazakhstan was delivered from Russia. The main importer is Baltika Breweries for which Kazakhstan is still the major foreign business.

== Major Kazakh beers ==
Karagandinskoye - Efes-Karaganda, Efes Beverage Group, Kazakhstan

Derbes - Derbes company, Carlsberg Group, Kazakhstan

Shymkentskoye - Shymkentpivo Ltd., Kazakhstan

== See also ==
- Beer and breweries by region
