= Beer in Cape Verde =

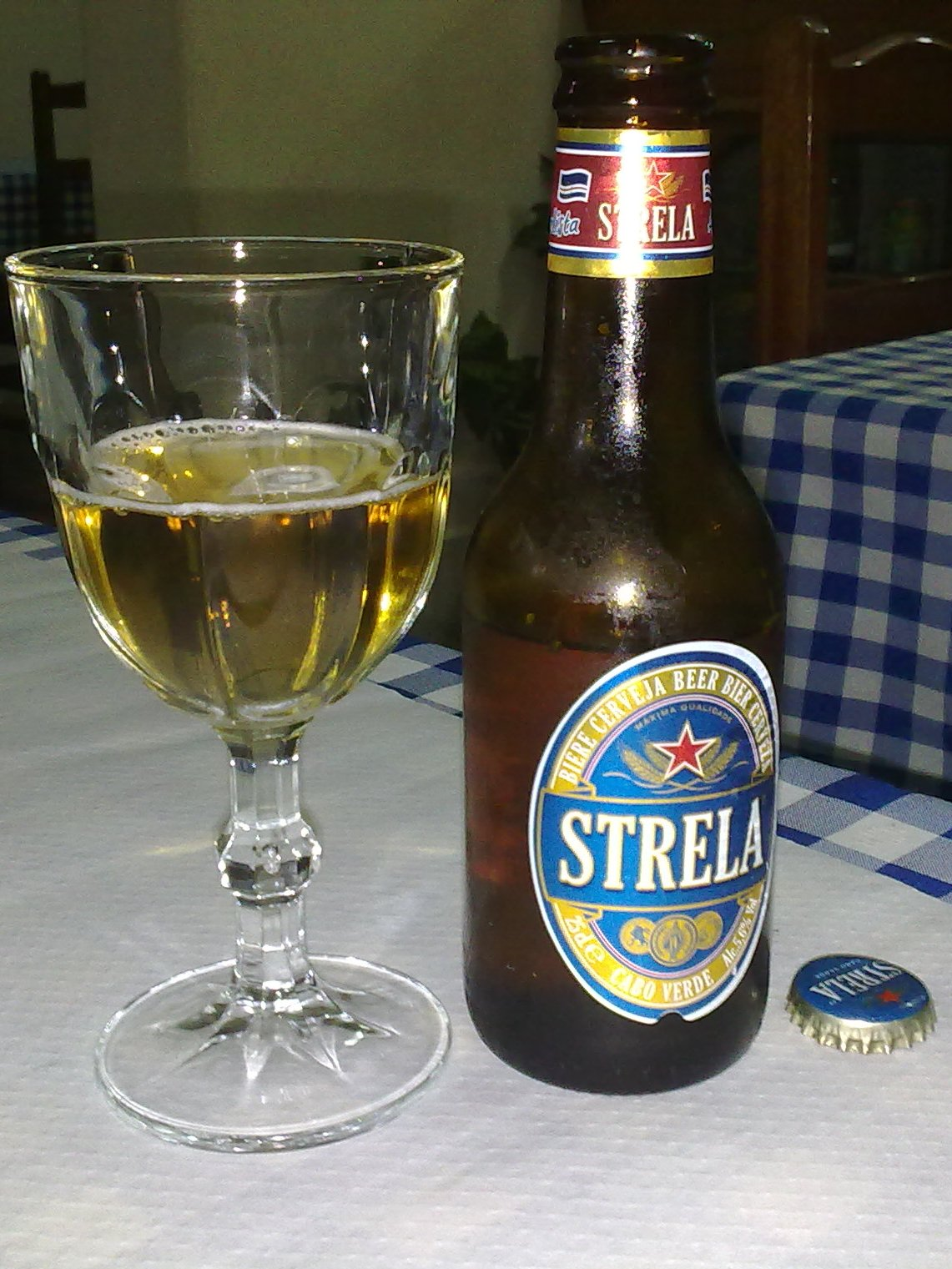
Strela beer

Beer in Cape Verde is dominated by a popular beer called Strela which is a Pale lager brewed by CERIS in the capital Praia on the island of Santiago. The beer is exported to Gambia, Guinea and Portugal.

== See also ==
- Beer and breweries by region
- Beer in Africa
