= Stup =

Stup may refer to:

- Stup, Serbia, a village near Sjenica
- Stup, Ilidža, a section of Ilidža, Bosnia and Herzegovina
- Stup Interchange, a road junction near Ilidža
- J. Anita Stup (born 1945), American politician
- Sarah Stup (born 1983), American writer and advocate
