= Beer in Portugal =

Beer in Portugal has a long history, going as far back as the time of the ancient Roman province of Lusitania, where beer was commonly made and drunk. Portugal is among the 11 largest beer producers in Europe, and is the 7th largest European exporter of the product.

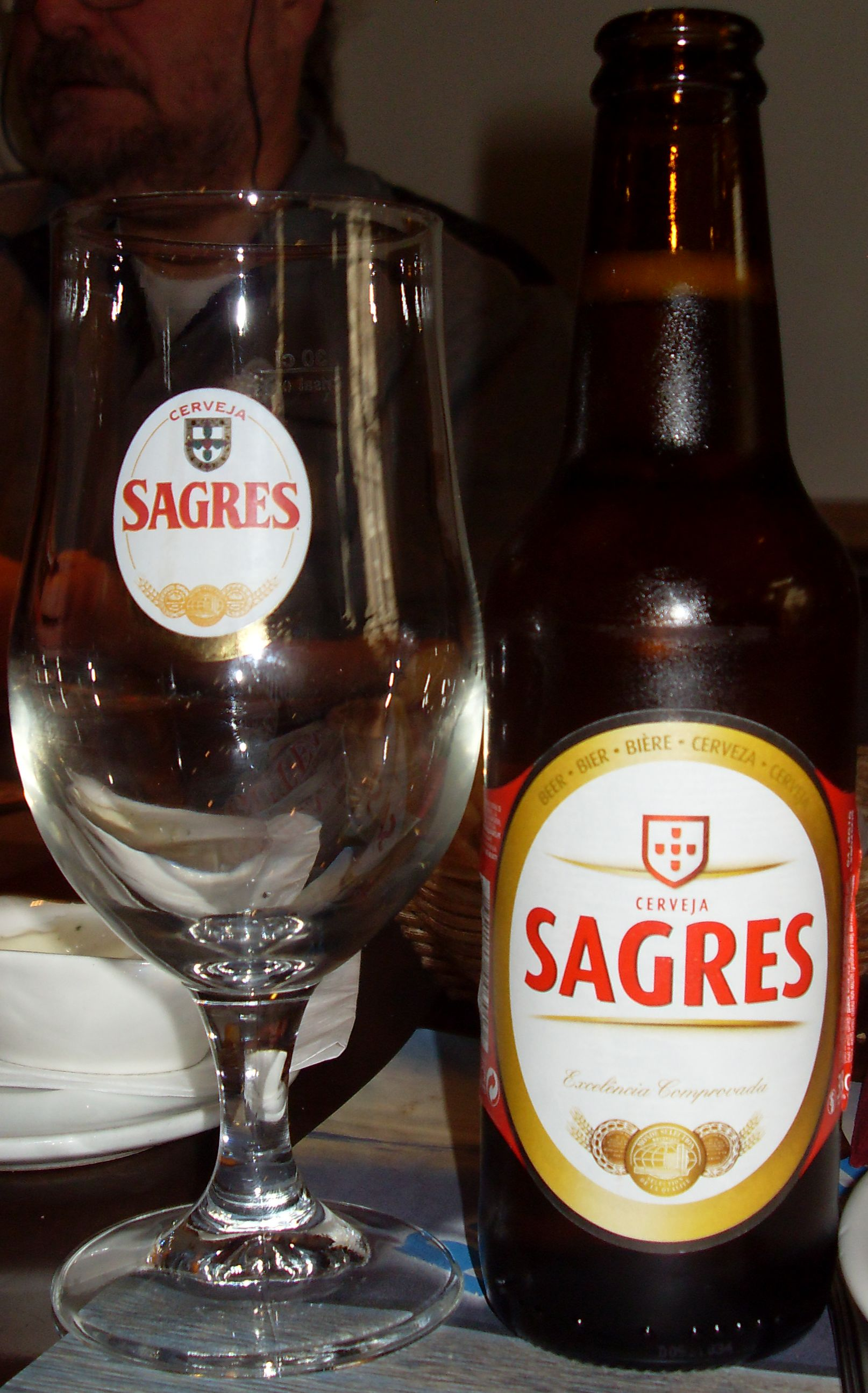
Sagres beer

The word for beer in Portuguese is cerveja, coming from the Latin word cerevisia. Modern Portuguese breweries were started in Portugal in the 19th century. Portugal's Estado Novo regime, headed by António Salazar, protected the national industry from foreign control, including the beer sector, during his time in power. Brewing in Portugal was long dominated by two companies — Sociedade Central de Cervejas, S.A. and Unicer - Bebidas de Portugal, S.A. They were created from the remains of well-established Portuguese brewers after the 1974 military coup, when the industry was nationalised. Both were privatised in the 1990s. Between them, they control more than 90% of the Portuguese beer market.

In 2003, Portugal had seven major breweries, employing approximately 1,848 people.

There are also around one hundred small breweries in the country, dedicated to the production of craft beer.

== Native beers ==
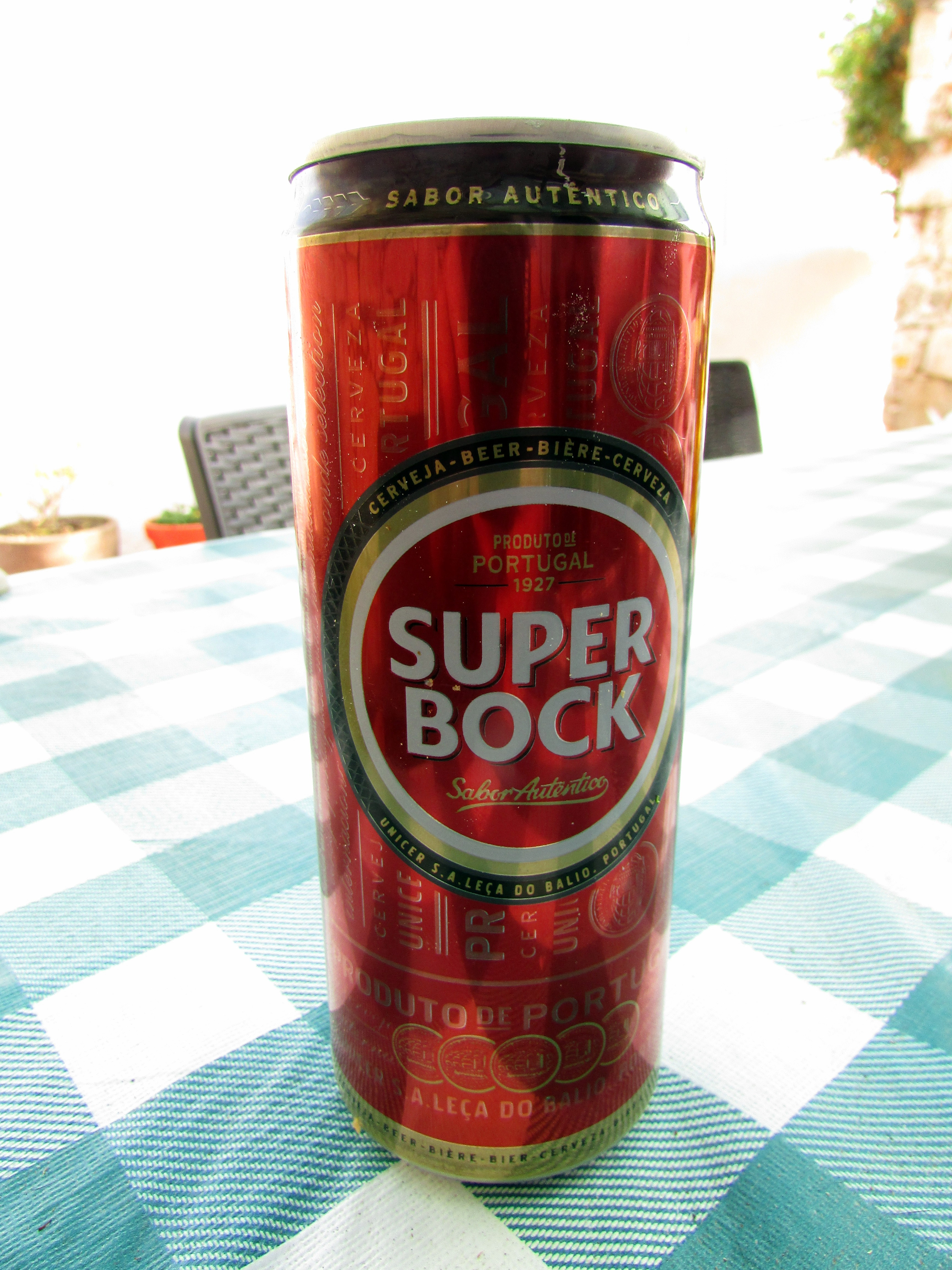
Super Bock beer

- Beasty Beers (craft beer)
- Cergal
- Cintra
- Coral
- Coruja (Super Bock)
- Cristal
- Dois Corvos (craft beer)
- Especial
- Maldita (craft beer)
- Nortada (Estrela Galicia)
- Sagres
- Senescal (craft beer)
- Super Bock
- Tagus
- Trindade
- Zarco

== Breweries ==
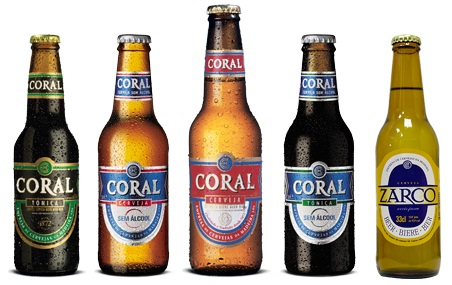
Coral & Zarco beers from Madeira Brewery

- Central de Cervejas (Sagres, Cergal, Trindade)
- Empresa de Cervejas da Madeira (Coral, Zarco)
- Fábrica de Cervejas e Refrigerantes João Melo Abreu (Especial)
- Faustino Microcervejeira (Maldita)
- Font Salem (Tagus, Cintra, Prima)
- Senescal Brewery
- Super Bock Group (Super Bock, Cristal, Coruja)

== See also ==
- Beer and breweries by region
