= Beer in Slovakia =

Two glasses of 10% Šariš Slovak beer

Beer in Slovakia (Slovak: pivo) has been produced and consumed at least since the 15th century. Together with the neighbouring Czech Republic, with whom it has a shared and intertwined history, Slovakia has a number of breweries and a rich beer culture.

Brews in Slovakia usually range between 3.8 and 5.0% alcohol content, and are traditionally classified by their density, or specific gravity using the Plato scale. This is the amount of dissolved solids before fermentation and tells roughly how much fermentable material (usually malted barley) was used and hints at what the alcohol content might be. Common measurements of 10° or 12° would be equivalent to 1040 or 1048 in the English "original gravity" scale. A common misconception is that this is a measure of the colour of the beer.

Since the fall of communism, most large commercial breweries were privatized and subsequently bought by foreign multinational companies. Today most are owned by either Heineken or SABMiller.

== History ==
Modern historians agree that the consumption of beer in Slovakia started with the pre-Slavic inhabitants and was later continued by the arriving Slavic tribes. The fermentation of beer during this early period was simple and commonly done within the household. Later, during the Middle Ages, the brewing of beer became a privilege that was granted mostly to townspeople, who were mostly members of the local City Council.

=== Middle Ages ===
In the 14th and 15th centuries, beer production was significantly extended. The most important brewing centres were mainly mining towns (Kremnica, Banská Bystrica, Banská Štiavnica), towns in the Spiš region (Kežmarok, Levoča), Bardejov, Prešov, Košice and the area south-west of present-day Slovakia (Trenčín, Trnava, Bratislava). Especially its famous beer is brewed in Bardejov. According to legend, the Hungarian king Matthias Corvinus used this beer for his wedding parties.

During this period, there existed a brewery in almost every medieval town including the oldest existing brewery in Vyhne Slovak. This was followed by the development of medieval craft guilds and the first brewing guild was founded in 1450 in Bardejov.

In 1473, alleged clandestine Knights from the order of the Knights Templar build a brewery of their own in the Banská Bystrica region. This turned out to be a good choice of location, as the region was a centre for the mining industry and over the years the brewery would find success selling to the miners that dominated the work force of the area. Miners in the area often refer to beer as liquid bread and they often drank it while they worked.

=== Industrial Revolution ===
The situation changed dramatically in the early 19th century, when beer production in the vast majority of towns and villages were destroyed, mainly due to the "beer tax" of 1850. Later during the 19th century, the brewing industry slowly began to recover with the help of new knowledge and technology. The arrival and implementation of the Watt steam engine along with artificial cooling (Carl von Linde), as well as the work of Louis Pasteur saw significant developments in the production of beer.

In the second half of the 19th century These new technologies gave rise to new breweries. Some examples were in Košice (1857), Michalovce (1867), Bratislava (Stein, 1873), Spišská Belá (1877), Martin (1893) and Nitra (1896). Their production was initially not significant given the low demand and competition from Hungarian breweries, which covered most of the demand in Slovakia. At the beginning of the 20th century Slovakia has almost 40 breweries with industrial production. Mostly, however, it was small to medium plants. The two strongest were Bratislava and Košice Bavernebel Stein. In comparison, however, the average annual production of the Burgher's Brewery in Plzeň was five times greater than the production of all the Slovak breweries combined.

=== Modern times ===
During the years of the Czechoslovak Republic from 1918 and onwards, the Slovak brewing industry lagged far behind that in the Czech lands. After World War II the new communist regime nationalized altogether 12 breweries, which was subsequently merged into three national companies. In 1953 this number rose to eight. Constantly increasing beer consumption created favourable conditions for the continued growth of brewing. Old enterprises were either renovated (Bratislava, Martin, Košice, Michalovce, Poprad, Nitra, Bytča) or cancelled altogether (Hlohovec, Levoča, Burgher Brewery Bratislava, Banská Bystrica). Gradually, the construction of new breweries began – Topoľčany (1964), Rimavská Sobota (1966), Veľký Šariš (1967), Hurbanovo (1969), Banská Bystrica (1971) and Trnava (1974). Hurbanovský brewery's capacity was 1.2 million hectoliters, which was the most in Slovakia. Even before the brewery in Hurbanovo built a new malt house, it had a record production of 66 thousand tons of malt annually.

The five largest breweries in Slovakia are members of the group which was nationalized after World War II, however closures amongst the independents have left Slovakia with only 4 breweries founded before 1950. There are currently 18 active industrial breweries in Slovakia. Microbreweries however, are becoming increasingly popular.

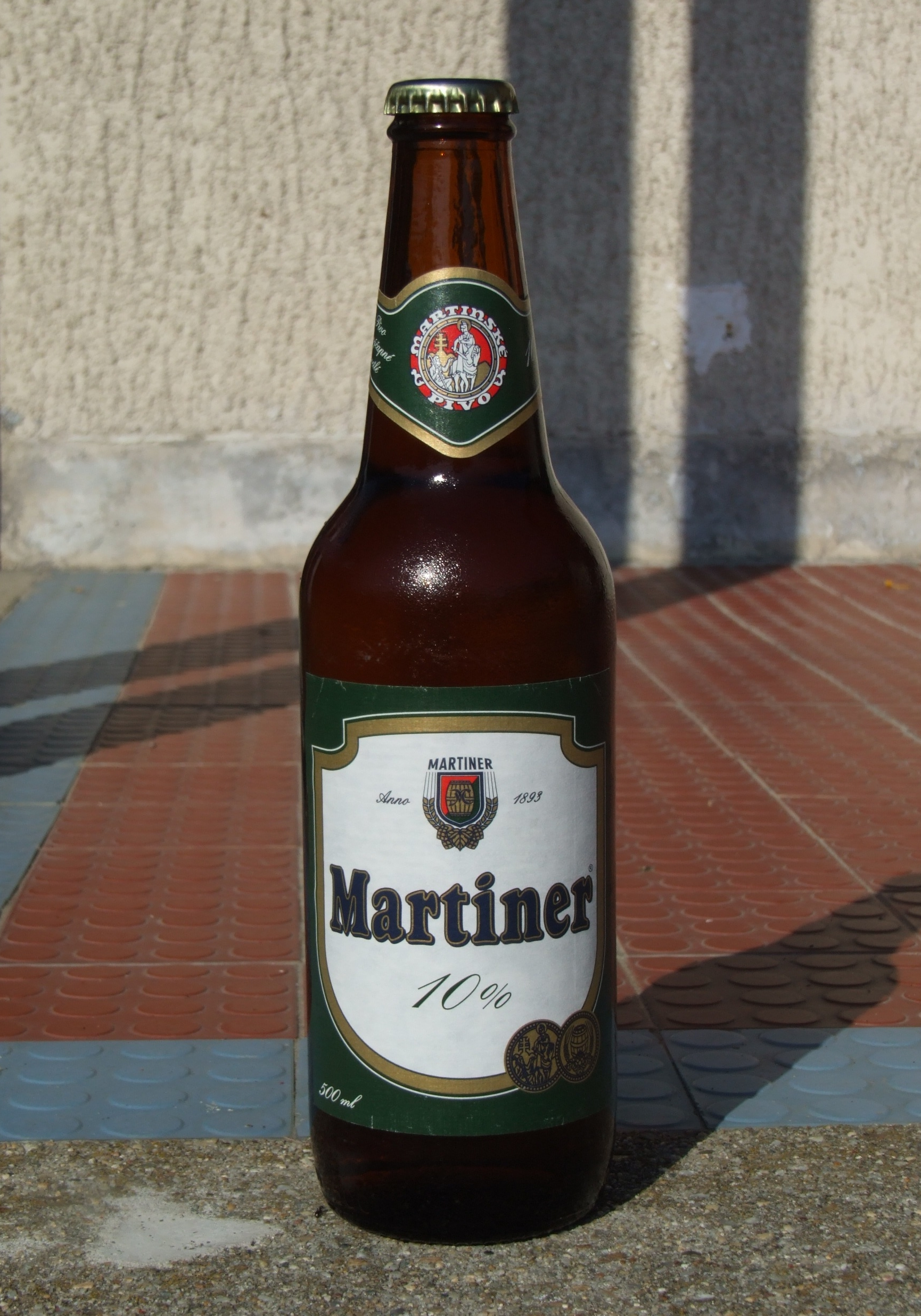
Martiner beer

== Breweries and brands ==
=== Brewery Hurbanovo ===
The Zlatý Bažant Brewery was founded in 1967, in Hurbanovo. Production began in 1969. In 1971 it became the first company in Eastern Europe to package their beer in cans. In 1995, Heineken bought the company and started to move production of other Slovak beers in its portfolio to Hurbanovo. Relocation of regional and long-standing beers away from their place of origin led to some enduring resentment against Heineken. Today Hurbanovo has one of the largest malting operations in Europe with much of it being exported across the world.

Brands

- Zlatý Bažant
- Kelt
- Corgoň
- Martiner
- Gemer

=== Šariš brewery ===
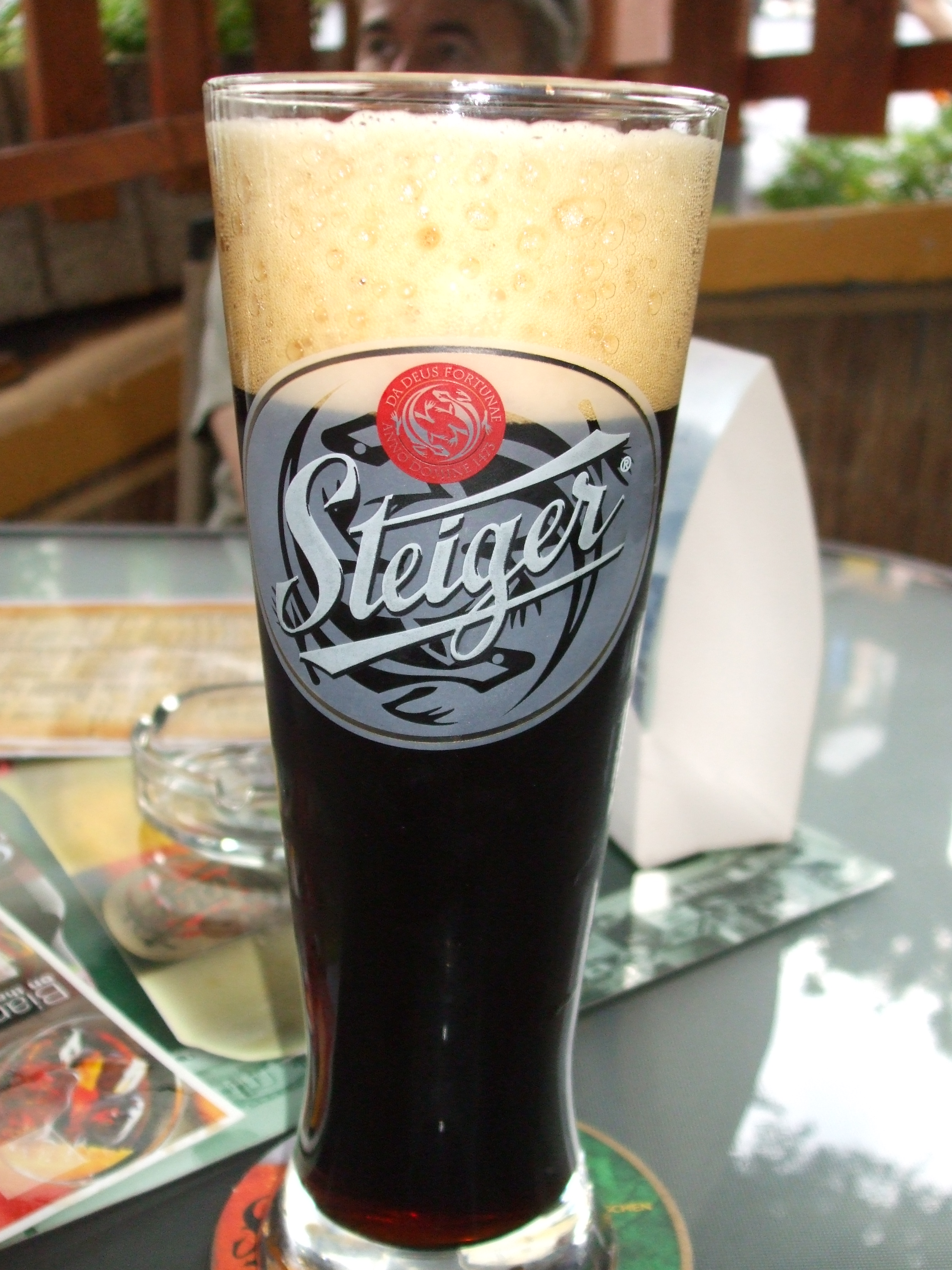
Steiger dark beer

In 1964, the Šariš brewery was built and it quickly became the largest brewery and the largest exporter of beer in Slovakia. As business boomed, Šariš expanded. They started producing and selling soft drinks and even had their own race car. By 1983, they were producing one million hectoliters of beer per year. They continued to be Slovakia's largest brewery, which drew attention from SABMiller (the brewing company behind MGD, Pilsner Urquell, Fosters, and many other successful breweries).

In 1997 SABMiller purchased the company. Ten years later they were merged with Topvar, another successful Slovak brewery. They continue producing the beers that made them so popular, using the same recipes. Reflecting the brewery's location in the eastern town of Veľký Šariš, the company has promoted its beers around the Eastern Slovakian culture, using the eastern Slovak dialect in commercials, as well as using its main slogan "Srdcom Východniar" (Slovak: Easterner by heart).

Brands

- Topvar
- Šariš
- Smädný Mních

=== Steiger brewery ===
Since 1473, the brewery has undergone many rebuilds and changed owners several times. Production went up and down, depending on the times. During times of war, sales would increase, however, during the German occupation in World War II Jaroslav Raiman, the director of operations was killed and many of the workers were arrested. This put a halt on production until December 1944 when the brewery slowly started making beer again. During the communist era, more people drank beer and business peaked. In 1958 they sold 280–300,000 hectoliters. It wasn't until 2004 that the brewery became what it is today. The name Steiger Pivovar was adopted in April 2006 and it became the companies main brand of beer. In 2007, Stein brewery moved its production from Bratislava, the country's capital, to the Steiger brewery. Steiger Brewery currently represents only 6–10% of the beer sales in Slovakia.

A glass of 12% Erb Weissbier

Brands

- Steiger
- Stein
- Kachelmann
- Sitňan
- HELL 11% Svetle

=== ERB brewery ===
The mining town of Banská Štiavnica had eight to ten breweries during the late Middle Ages. These, being run by the owners of the local mines, meant the salaries paid to the miners went straight back to the owners. Centuries later in 2010, a local mining engineer, Eduard Rada opened ERB (Eduard Rada Breweries) Brewery. Surrounded by his immediate family in senior management, he began to brew his own way. The beers of ERB was Lager 10% and 12%, ERB Special Dark 13% and ERB Weizen 12%, have been produced at the brewery since its opening. Later, ERB Smoked Lager 12% was added, which has become a forerunner for the ERB Limited Edition.

In 2013 ERB rejected repeated offers to export beer to Japan, Norway, Australia and Austria. Owner Eduard Rada wants ERB beer to be linked to the country of Slovakia: "So tourists can say, I was in a country where they brew great beer.“

Types

- ERB PALE LAGER 10%
- ERB PALE LAGER 12%
- ERB BLACK BEER 13%
- ERB WHEAT BEER
- ERB BRAXATORIS
- NON ALCOHOLIC ERB
- ERB VINTAGE BEER

=== Urpiner Brewery ===
The tradition of brewing in the city of Banská Bystrica dates to 1501 with the arrival of new German and Jewish settlers in the city. In 1524 the city gains official privilege to brew beer from King Louis II of Hungary. By the 17th century, around 80 small breweries had been established

The modern brewery was established in the year 1971 with later restructuring into Banskobystrický pivovar, a.s. in the year 2007

Types

- URPÍN 89
- Urpiner Dark Nealko
- Urpiner IPL 13°
- Urpiner Classic 10°
- Urpiner Dark 11°
- Urpiner Premium 12°
- Urpiner Extra chmelený 14°
- Urpiner Exclusive 16°
- Urpiner Nealko
- Urpiner Radler
- Urpiner Radler Nealko
- Kaprál 10°
- Kaprál 11°
