= Beer in Slovenia =

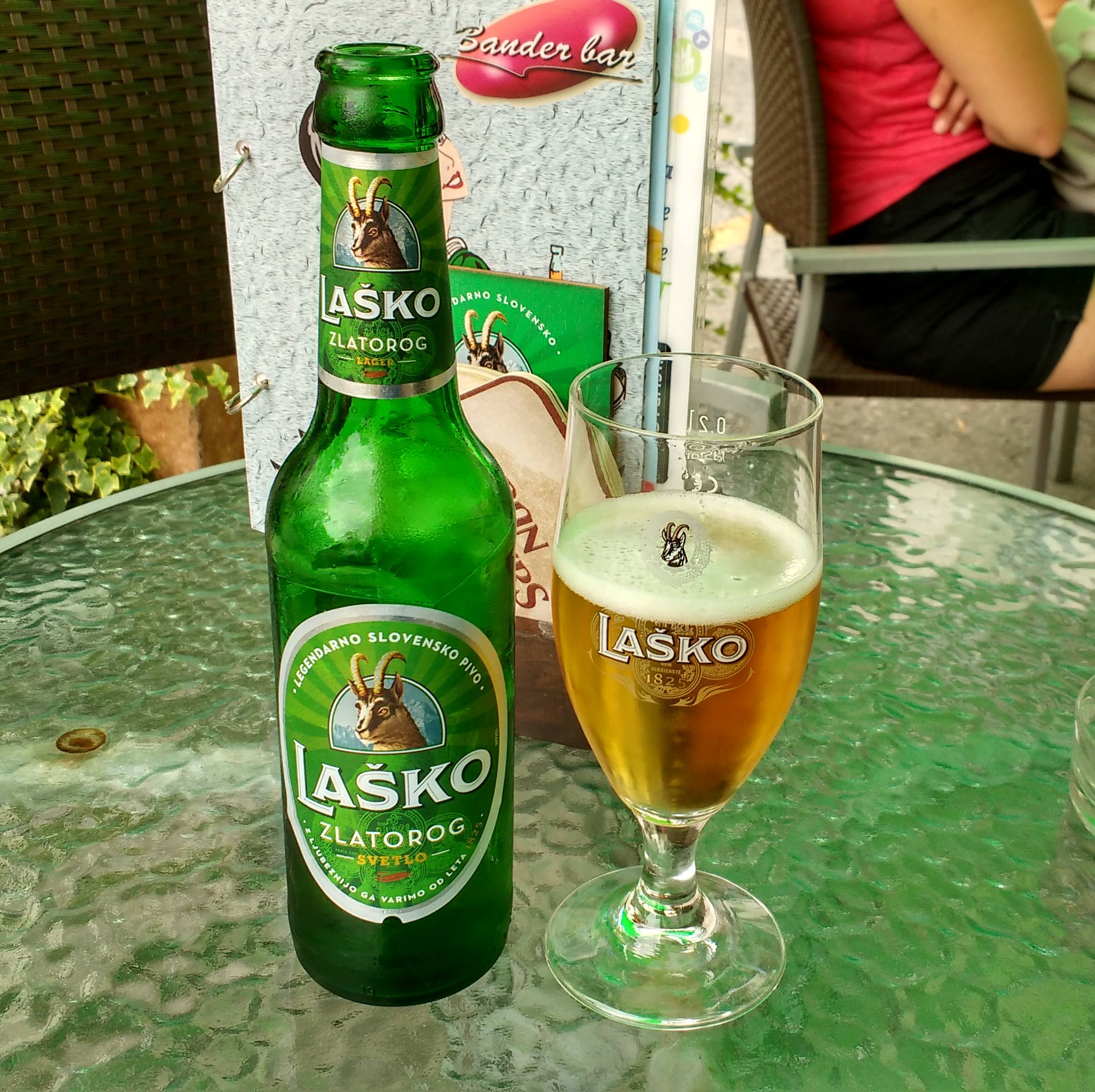
Laško Zlatorog

Beer in Slovenia is dominated by the pale lager market. The most commonly known brands of Slovenian beer, now united under the same parent company, are Laško and Union, although a number of smaller breweries exist.

== History ==
There were several minor breweries in Slovenia before the 19th century. The first lager brewery, the Laško Brewery, was established in 1825 in Laško.

== Beers ==
Today, two major beers dominate the market and both breweries are currently owned by Laško Brewery (Pivovarna Laško) after buying Union brewery with the Interbrew. Both breweries offer a variety of beers, but the most popular are plain lagers, Union beer and Laško/Zlatorog beer. The main beer is lager, drunk in over 95% of the cases.

Since both are lagers, the beers are similar. Laško is a bit more bitter. Union is the beer of the capital city, Ljubljana and Laško is mostly drunk elsewhere. Estimates give Laško beer a 60% market share.

Together with the two main breweries, there are around 127 breweries in the country.

== See also ==
- Beer and breweries by region
