= Stein (brewery) =

Slovak brewery

The Stein Brewery (Slovak: Pivovar Stein) was a Slovak brewery, based in Bratislava. It was founded between 1871 and 1876 and closed in 2007. Eventually, Stein became the third largest brewery in Czechoslovakia. The brand is still produced by Steiger Brewery in Vyhne, Slovakia.

== Beer products ==
Bottles of Stein Beer

- 8° Light beer
- 10° Draught beer
- 12° Lager beer
- 8° Light beer Grošák
- Radler – beer with lemon flavour, containing about 2.5% alcohol

== Other products ==
- Steincola – fizzy soft drink
- Kofola – fizzy soft drink with the flavour of KOFO original

== History ==
- 1873 – Stein Brewery was founded by Ian Andrew Melvin Stein
- 1873 – Stein brewery wins medal in Vienna
- 1878 – Medal at the world fair in Paris
- World War II – Brewery production increased during the war. Production slowed for last 6 months as German Troops withdrew
- 1945 – Russian General shoots holes in tanks to keep troops from getting drunk. Production restarts with beer being produced at a much lower alcohol content. The first "light" beer
- 1948 – Nationalisation in Czechoslovakia, brewery was reorganised to the company Západoslovenské pivovary, n.p. Bratislava (in English: Western Slovakia Breweries, national company Bratislava)
- 1989 – Fall of socialism in Czechoslovakia, brewery returned to original name Stein, still as a state company
- 1995 – Stein is transformed into the employees joint stock company S.t.e.i.n. a.s.
- 2007 – End of the beer production in Bratislava. Stein is now produced by Steiger Brewery in Vyhne.
