= Beer in Kenya =

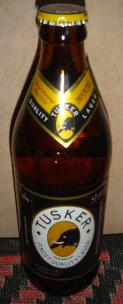
A bottle of Tusker in 2008

Beer in Kenya started with Charles and George Hurst founded Kenya Breweries Limited in 1922 producing Tusker Lager. The name Tusker came about in memory of George who was trampled to death by a rogue male elephant in 1923.

White Cap Lager is a pale lager and depicts the snow-capped peak of Mount Kenya. It is noted to be favorite of former president Mwai Kibaki.

White Cap and Tusker Lager are both products of East African Breweries Limited brewed in Ruaraka from locally sourced barley.

Keroche Breweries founded in 1997 and based in Naivasha brews Summit Malt. Big Five Breweries and Sierra Premium are based in Nairobi and specialize in craft brewing.

== See also ==
- Beer in Africa
- Beer and breweries by region
- East African Breweries
