= Beer in Myanmar =

Beer in Myanmar has a long history of homebrewing, with traditional brews made from rice, millet, or corn, often flavored with fruits, spices, or medicinal herbs. Commercial brewing of beer in Myanmar commenced in 1886 and until 2015 was dominated by a single producer, Myanmar Brewery Ltd.

== Commercial breweries ==
In 1886, the British Raj converted a cannon factory in Mandalay, established in 1859 by Crown Prince Kanaung, into a brewery. Edward Dyer was the first brewer and the brewery was known as the Dyer Meakin (Burma) Brewery. During the Japanese occupation of the country, the Takasago Beer Company ran the brewery, renaming it to the Takasago Brewery, which later was converted into a miso and soy-sauce factory when raw materials for beer production came into short supply.

In 1954, the brewery was nationalised and renamed the State Brewery. During the early 1960s, the ownership and brewery's name changed numerous times; the Mandalay Brewing and Distillery, the Burma Beverage Ltd and the Industrial Development Corporation. In 1965 the company fell under the control of the Food Management Division of the Ministry of Industry and its name changed to the People's Brewery and Distillery, however by the early 1990s it was bankrupt. In 1993, a joint venture was formed between a Singapore-based company, Yaung Chi Oo Trading, and the State Peace and Development Council (SPDC). The joint venture came to an abrupt end in November 1998 when the brewery and its operations were again nationalised. The Mandalay Brewery is currently owned by Myanmar Brewery Ltd.

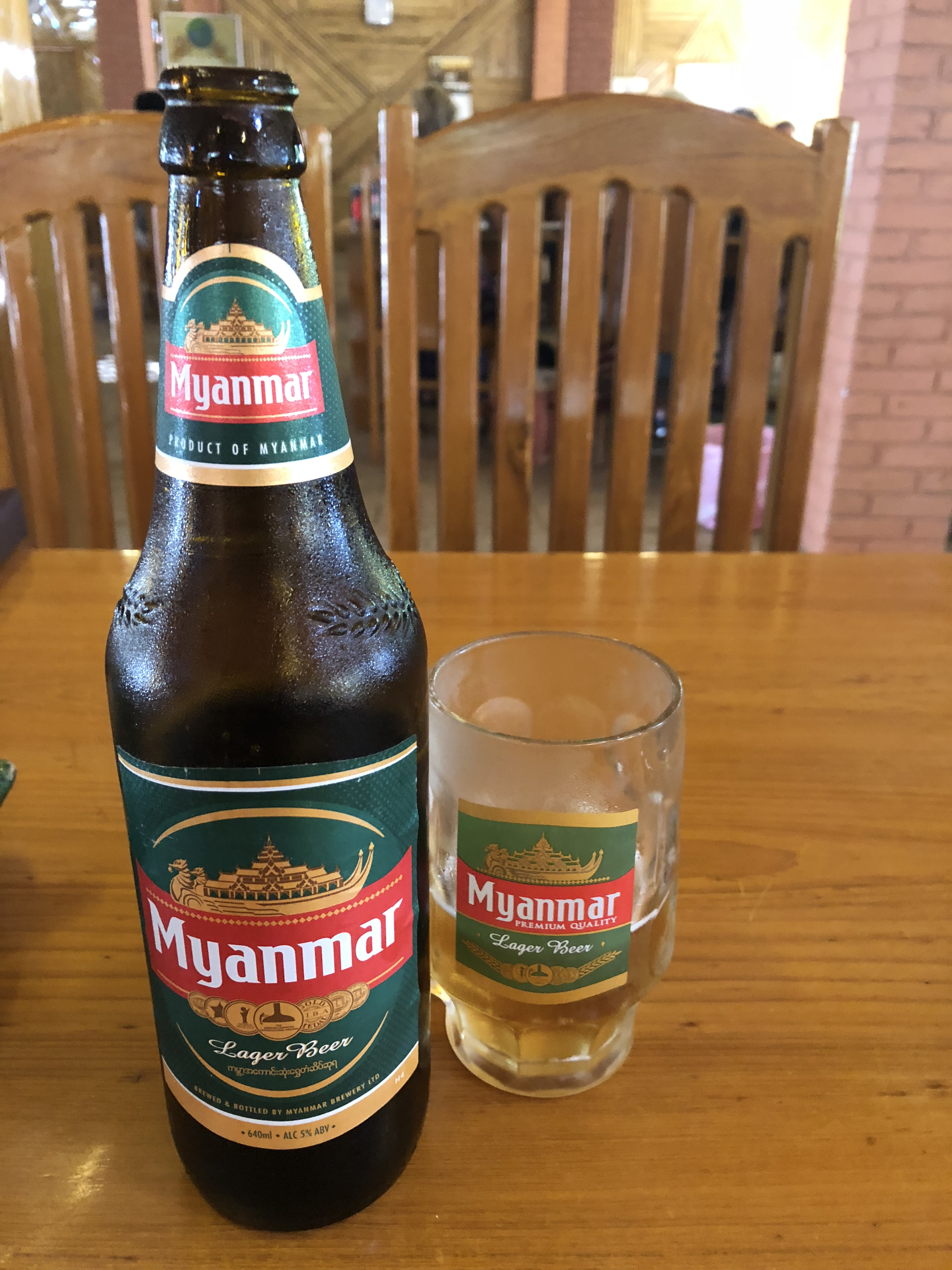
Myanmar Lager Beer

On 29 March 1995, the first new commercial brewery in Myanmar, Myanmar Brewery Ltd, was formed as a joint venture between Union of Myanmar Economic Holdings Limited (UMEHL) and Asia Pacific Breweries (APB), (a joint venture between Singaporean drinks producer, Fraser and Neave and Dutch brewer, Heineken), with a total invested capital of US$30 million. The company's brewery located on a 13.6 ha (34 acres) site in the Pyinmabin Industrial Complex, Mingaladon, Yangon commenced operations in September 1996. The brewery had an initial capacity of 140,000 hectolitres and produced Tiger Beer and Myanmar Beer.

In 1997 APB transferred its 55% stake in the company to Fraser & Neave, amid international condemnation of the human rights abuses by the country's military government at that time.

Dagon Beverages Company Ltd, a joint venture between Myanmar Economic Corporation, Bermuda's Brew Invest and Myanmar Golden Star (MGS), was established in 1998 producing Dagon Lager Beer. The joint venture introduced Dagon Extra Strong Beer in 2005, Dagon Super Beer in 2014, and Dagon Light Lager Beer in 2016.

In February 2013, the Carlsberg Group secured one of four foreign beer brewing licences. The Danish company formed a joint venture with Myanmar Golden Star (MGS), establishing Myanmar Carlsberg Company Ltd and began construction of a US$75 million brewery in Bago in October. On 7 May 2015, the brewery commenced operations, brewing Carlsberg, Tuborg and a Myanmar-specific brand called Yoma.

In July 2015, Heineken International established APB Alliance Brewery Company Limited, a joint venture with Alliance Brewery Company. The company's US$60 million 330,000 hectolitre brewery, in Hmawbi, produces Tiger, Heineken, ABC and a new local brand, Regal Seven.

In August 2015, Myanmar Brewery ceased producing and selling Tiger and ABC, as it gave up its rights to the brands when it split from Fraser and Neave, with the Kirin Company purchasing Fraser and Neave's holding in the company.

== Microbreweries ==
In January 2017, Myanmar opened its first craft beer microbrewery, Burbrit, a contraction of Burma and Britain, in recognition of the British influence on the nation's brewing history.
