= Waliców Street =

Street in Warsaw, Poland

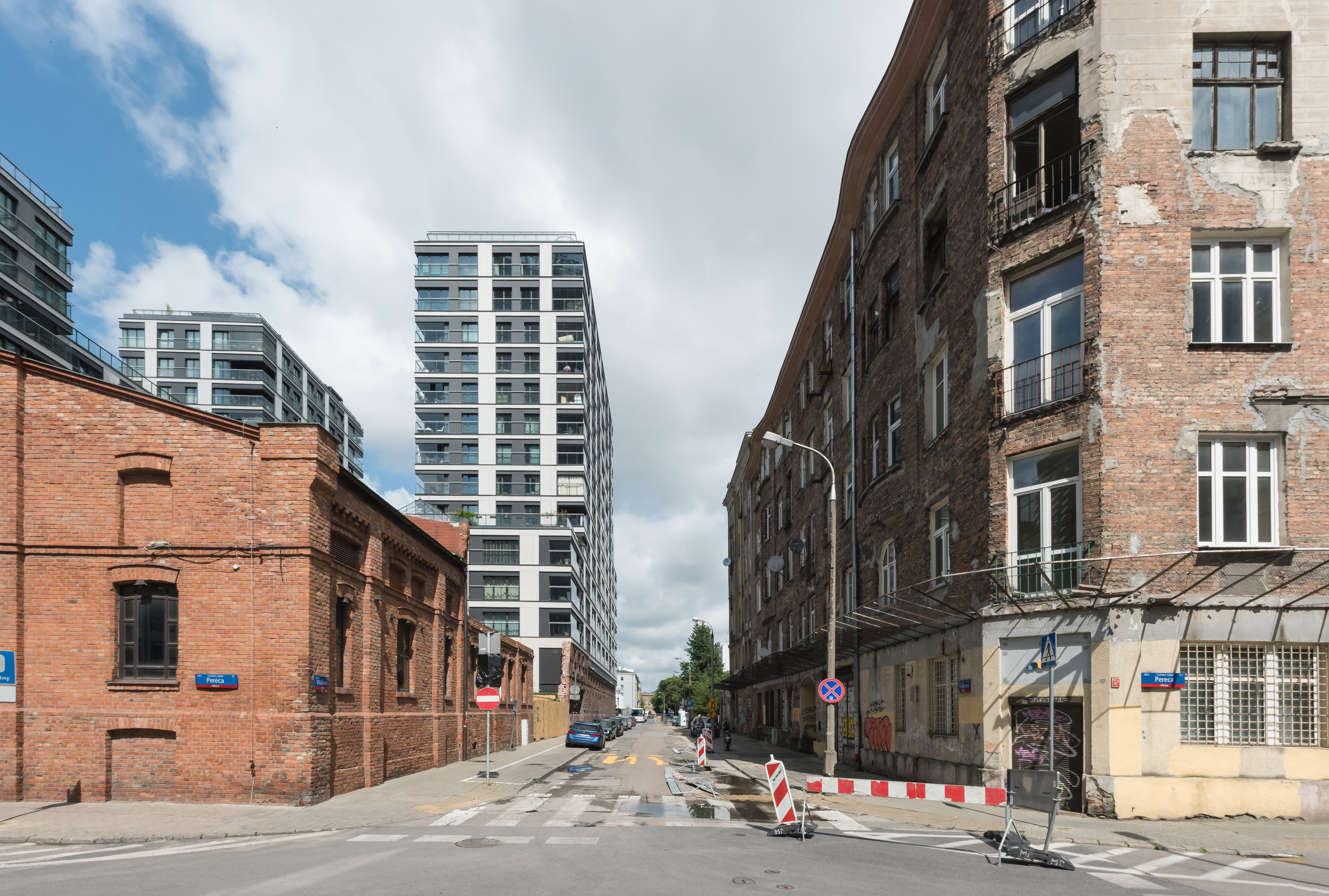
- Waliców Street at Isaac Leib Peretz Street
- Part of: Mirów
- Location: Warsaw, Poland
- Coordinates: 52°14′8.2″N 20°59′31.6″E
- From: Isaac Leib Peretz Street
- Major junctions: Grzybowska Street (160 m); Krochmalna Street (340 m)
- To: Chłodna Street (460 m)

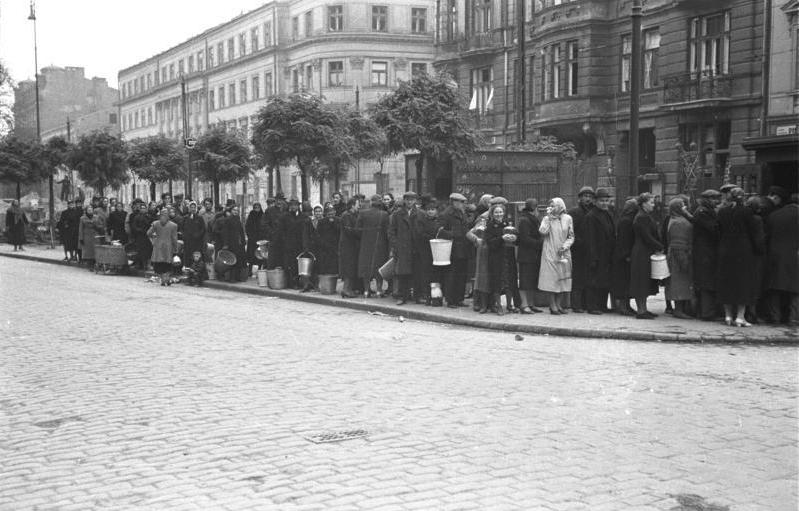
A queue for water on Chłodna Street, with the school at 34 Waliców Street in the background (September or October 1939)

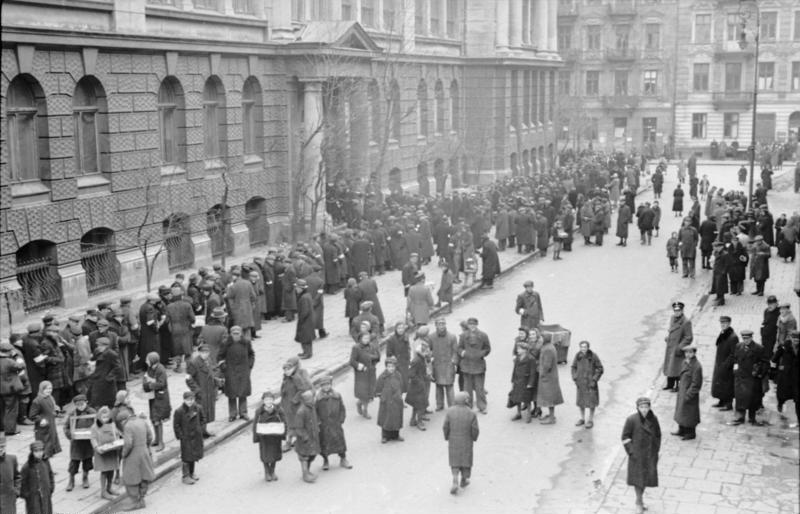
Crowd in front of the former Merchants' Association Commercial School at the corner of Prosta Street and Waliców Street (May 1941)

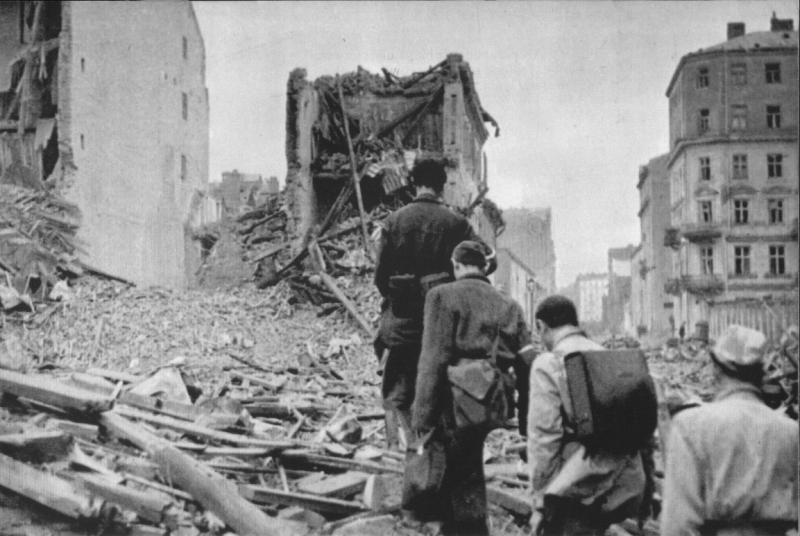
Patrol of the Agaton Platoon of the Pięść Battalion in the ruins of the destroyed school at 11/13 Chłodna Street, corner of 34 Waliców Street, moving toward Waliców Street. On the right, 23 Waliców Street; the tall tenement behind Krochmalna Street is 21 Waliców Street

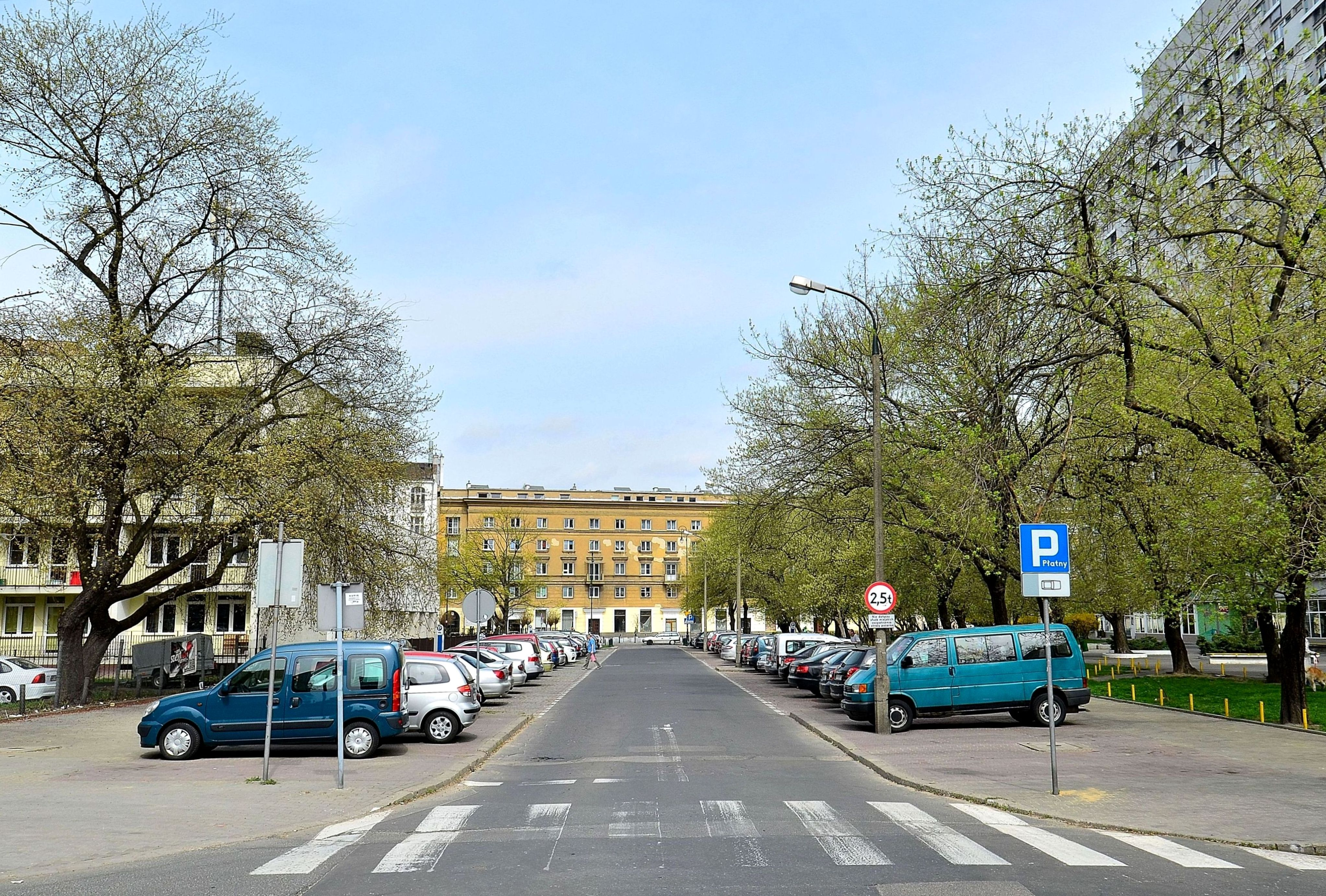
Waliców Street at the corner of Krochmalna Street, view toward Chłodna Street

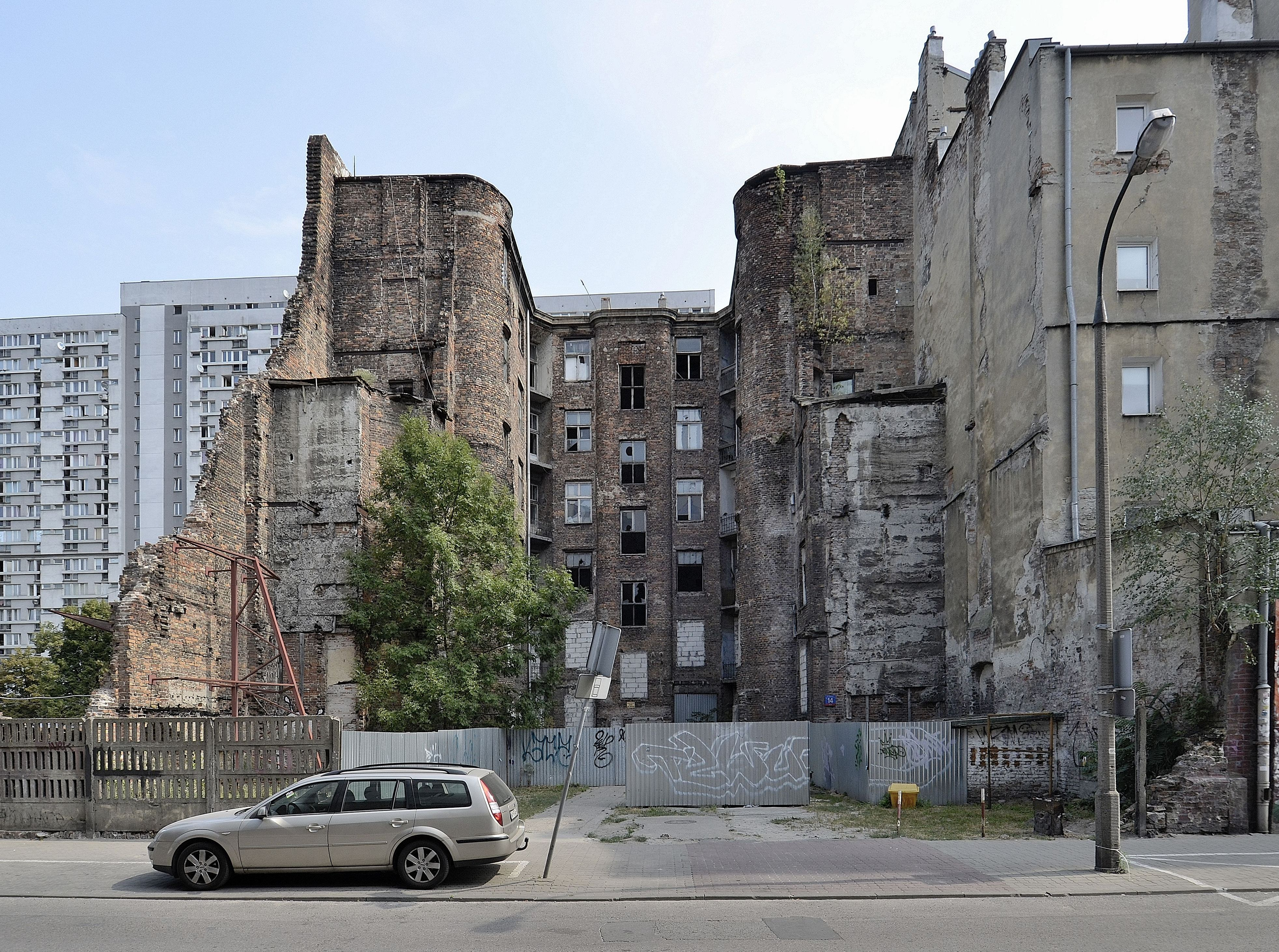
Tenement at 14 Waliców Street, home of Menachem Kipnis and Władysław Szlengel

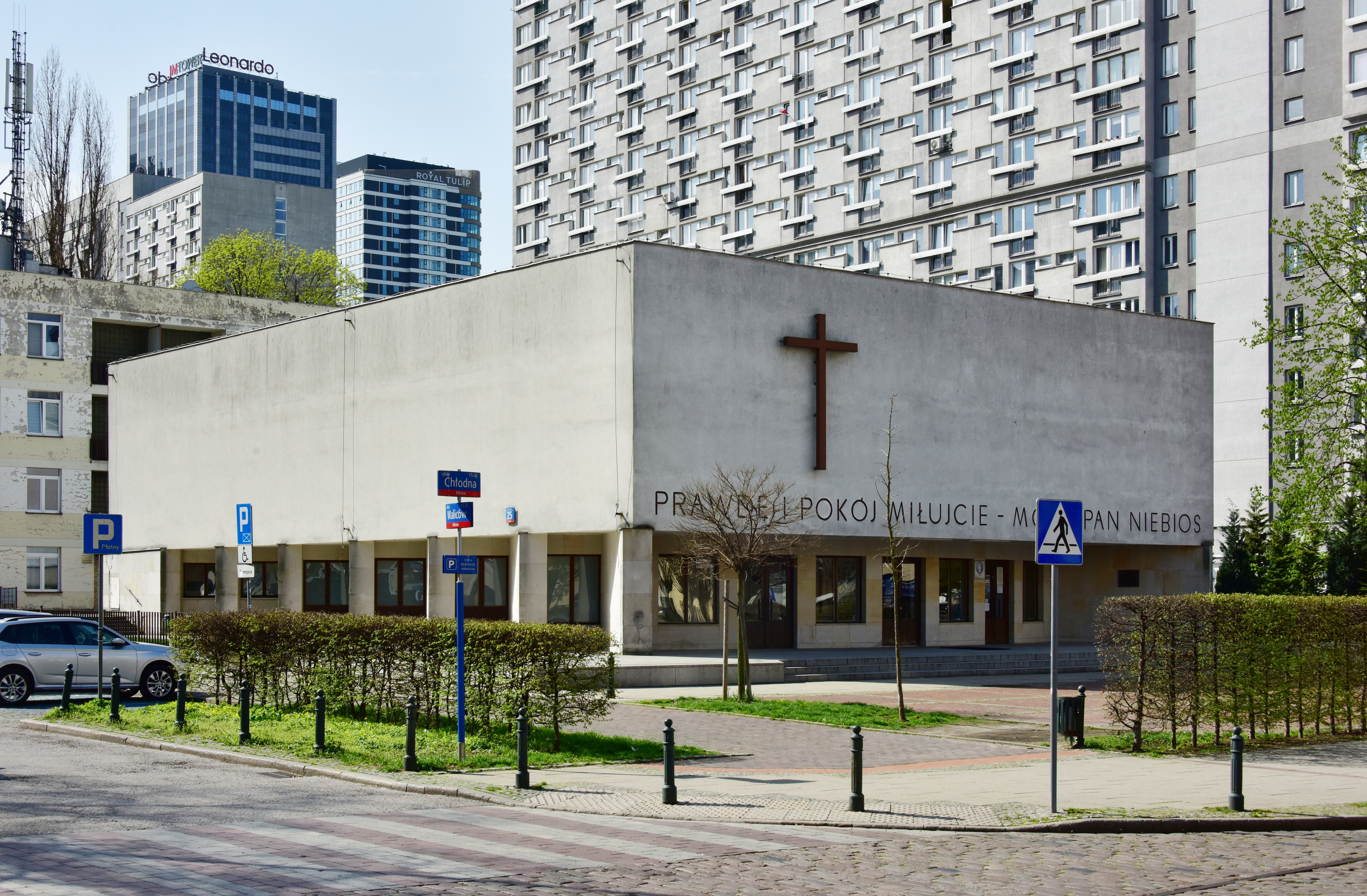
Baptist Chapel at 25 Waliców Street

Waliców Street is a street in the Wola district of Warsaw, Poland. It extends from Isaac Leib Peretz Street, intersecting Grzybowska Street and Krochmalna Street, and ends at Chłodna Street.

At the turn of the 19th and 20th centuries, the street was extended to Prosta Street. However, following the wartime destruction in 1945, it was shortened again.

== Name ==
The street's name, officially designated in 1770, derives from the Waliców estate established by Rawa Voivode Bazyli Walicki.

== History ==
The Waliców estate, incorrectly referred to as a jurydyka, was established in the second half of the 18th century when Bazyli Walicki leased part of the Warsaw starostwo in 1763. The rectangular plot had its shorter side along the so-called Wola road (soon named Chłodna Street). In 1767, surveyor Deutsch divided the area into 30 parcels, with a central street named Waliców running perpendicular to Chłodna Street, intersected by Krochmalna, Grzybowska, and Ceglana (now Isaac Leib Peretz) streets. Street names were officially approved in 1770, and parcels were numbered in 1784. Administratively and judicially, the settlement was subordinate to Grzybów and was incorporated into Warsaw between 1791 and 1794.

By 1763, two breweries operated on Waliców Street: one owned by Anna Raubach and another by Henryk Grodke. Over the next 20 years, the area was fully parceled and developed an industrial-agricultural character, with 10 breweries and a brickworks nearby. In 1805, the C. Ulrich Horticultural Works were established at Ceglana Street, gradually relocated to Górce from 1878. Most entrepreneurs were of German origin, often signing documents in blackletter. Residents included brewery workers, small craftsmen, milk vendors, and laborers. In 1822, a recreational hall named Wrocławska, later Srebrna, was established at the corner with Krochmalna Street.

In 1854, a large brewery owned by Herman Jung was established on a plot between Żelazna, Grzybowska, Waliców, and Ceglana streets, expanding an existing brewery from 1824 owned by Jan Bogumił Kazimirus. After Herman Jung's death, the Waliców brewery was closed, and in 1919, his son Seweryn's enterprise joined Haberbusch i Schiele. From 1890, the property was owned by Bank Handlowy, which leased buildings to various companies, including A. Domański's lemonade and soda water factory from 1897.

Between 1905 and 1906, a modern building for the Merchants' Association Commercial School, designed by Edward Goldberg, was constructed at the corner of Prosta and Waliców streets. Notable for its electric lighting and indoor plumbing, it was advanced for its time and location.

In November 1940, most of Waliców Street, except for approximately 100 meters from Chłodna Street and 50 meters of the western side from Ceglana Street, was included in the Warsaw Ghetto. The section near Ceglana Street was excluded to allow access to Domański's factory, which operated until 1944. In December 1941, the eastern side between Chłodna and Krochmalna streets was removed from the ghetto, while the western side up to Chłodna Street was included. In August 1942, during Grossaktion Warsaw, the area south of Chłodna Street was reassigned to the non-Jewish side, except for the Toebbens workshop, which included a section of Waliców Street between Prosta and Ceglana streets.

During the early days of the Warsaw Uprising, the area was controlled by units under Gustaw Billewicz, codenamed Sosna. After his withdrawal to Old Town on 6 August, the Chrobry II Group took over. Following the breakthrough by Heinz Reinefarth's forces along Chłodna and Elektoralna streets to Iron Gate Square and further through Saxon Garden to Kierbedź Bridge on 6–7 August, only the southern part of the street remained in insurgent hands. Heavy fighting occurred between Grzybowska and Krochmalna streets, which changed hands multiple times, but the initial section from Ceglana Street remained under Polish control until the capitulation on 3 October.

After World War II, most buildings were destroyed, and even partially surviving structures were demolished, with some lasting until the 1960s. The Merchants' Association Commercial School building was fully demolished in 1961. Surviving pre-war structures include tenements at 10, 12, 14, and 17 Waliców Street and a fragment of the Jung brewery wall at 11 Waliców Street, later incorporated into the Aurum office building's façade and, after its demolition, into the ground floor of a new building.

In 2020, during the construction of the Mennica Legacy Tower office complex, Waliców Street was extended to Prosta Street.

== Notable buildings ==
- 11 Waliców Street: A preserved fragment of the Jung brewery wall, which served as a Warsaw Ghetto boundary from 1940 to 1942. The remaining structures were taken over by the Mint of Poland in the late 1980s for redevelopment. Efforts by the Cultural Heritage Guardians of Warsaw prevented demolition, leading to the factory building at the corner of Isaac Leib Peretz and Waliców streets and the factory hall wall on Waliców Street being listed in the Registry of Cultural Property. Between 1999 and 2000, the remnants were integrated into a seven-story office building designed by R. Urbańczyk, L. Czapliński, and T. Wekk. In June 2016, the superstructure was demolished, and a new apartment building by the Mint of Poland was erected, incorporating the historic wall. A bronze plaque, installed in May 2000 (replacing an earlier metal one), marks the ghetto wall's location.
- 10, 12, and 14 Waliców Street: Tenements from between 1910 and 1914, listed in the Registry of Cultural Property in 2018.
- 25 Waliców Street: The Baptist Chapel, dedicated on 9 September 1961.

== Notable residents ==
- At 14 Waliców Street, residents included Menachem Kipnis, a journalist, Jewish music expert, and social activist who died in 1942, and Władysław Szlengel, a Warsaw Ghetto poet killed during the Warsaw Ghetto Uprising in a bunker at Świętojerska Street.
- At 6 Waliców Street lived Helena Szereszewska, author of the memoir Krzyż i mezuza about life in the ghetto.

== Additional information ==
- After the fall of the Warsaw Uprising, many Robinson Crusoes of Warsaw hid in the ruins and cellars. From 7 October 1944 to 18 January 1945, a group of 10 people survived in specially prepared deep underground rooms beneath the Merchants' Association Commercial School, so low they could not stand upright.
- At the corner of Waliców and Grzybowska streets stood the Wołowski family house, the only remnant of the childhood home of 19th-century Polish pianist Maria Szymanowska. The house burned down in 1944, but traces of its roof and floor levels remain visible on the wall of the tenement at 46 Grzybowska Street.
