= Kvass =

Fermented low-alcoholic beverage

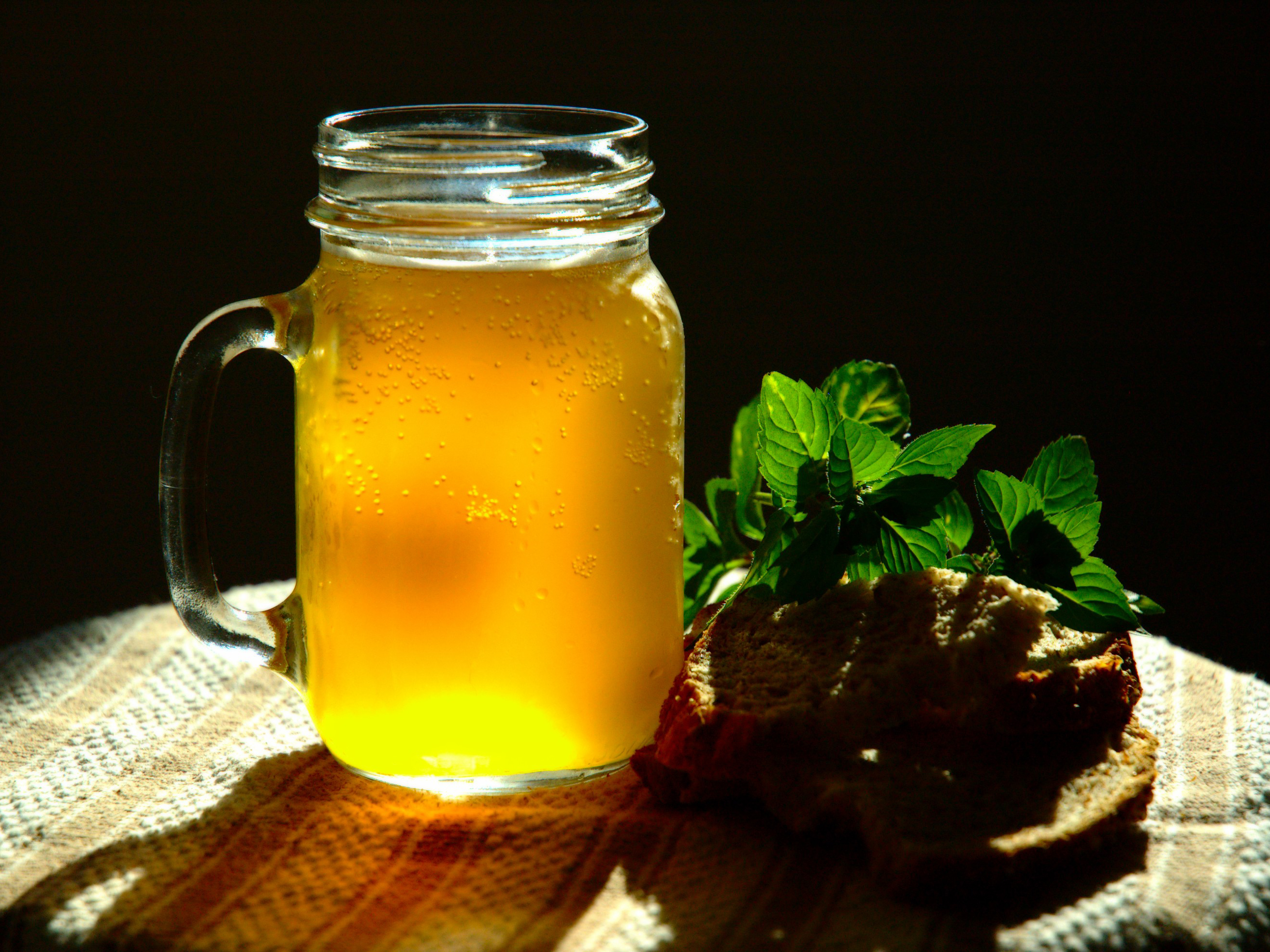
- A mug of mint kvass and its ingredients
- Alternative names: Kvas, kwas, gira, burakhi, kali
- Type: Fermented low-alcohol beverage
- Course: Beverage
- Region or state: Northeastern Europe; Central and Eastern Europe; Caucasus; Xinjiang, China; Heilongjiang, China
- Associated cuisine: Slavic (Belarusian, Polish, Russian, and Ukrainian), Estonian, Latvian, Lithuanian, Georgian and Uyghur cuisine
- Serving temperature: Cold or room temperature
- Main ingredients: Rye bread or rye flour and rye malt, as well as water and yeast
- Ingredients generally used: Berries, fruits, herbs, honey
- Variations: Beetroot kvass, white kvass
- Food energy (per serving): 30–100 kcal (130–420 kJ) (approximately)
Nutritional value
(per serving)
- Protein: <0.15 g
- Fat: <0.10 g
- Carbohydrate: 5.90 g

Kvass is a fermented, cereal-based, low-alcohol beverage of cloudy appearance and a sweet and sour taste.

Kvass originates from northeastern Europe, where grain production was considered insufficient for beer to become a daily drink. The first written mention of kvass is found in Primary Chronicle, describing the celebration of Vladimir the Great's baptism in 988.

Traditionally, kvass is made by soaking a mash of rye bread or rye flour and malt in hot water, then fermenting it for about 12 hours at room temperature with sugar and bread yeast or baker's yeast. In industrial methods, producers make kvass from wort concentrate combined with various grain mixtures. It is a drink known in Belarus, Estonia, Latvia, Lithuania, Moldova, Armenia, Georgia, Poland, Russia, and Ukraine. Kvass (or similar beverages) are also popular in parts of China, Finland, Kazakhstan, and Uzbekistan.

== Terminology ==
The word kvass is ultimately from Proto-Indo-European base *kwh₂et- ('to become sour'). In English it was first mentioned in a text around 1553 as quass. Nowadays, the name of the drink is almost the same in most languages: in Polish: kwas chlebowy (lit. 'bread kvass', to differentiate it from kwas, 'acid', originally from kwaśny, 'sour'); Belarusian: квас, kvas; Russian: квас, kvas; Ukrainian: квас/хлібний квас/сирівець, kvas/khlibny kvas/syrivets; Latvian: kvass; Romanian: cvas; Armenian: Կվաս; Hungarian: kvasz; Serbian: квас/kvas; Chinese: 格瓦斯/克瓦斯, géwǎsī/kèwǎsī; Eastern Finnish: vaasa. Non-cognates include Estonian: kali, Finnish: kalja, Georgian: ბურახი, burakhi; Latvian: dzersis (lit. 'beverage'), Latgalian: dzyra (lit. 'beverage', similar Lithuanian: gira, lit. 'beverage', similar to Latvian: dzira), Swedish: bröddricka (lit. 'bread drink').

== Production ==
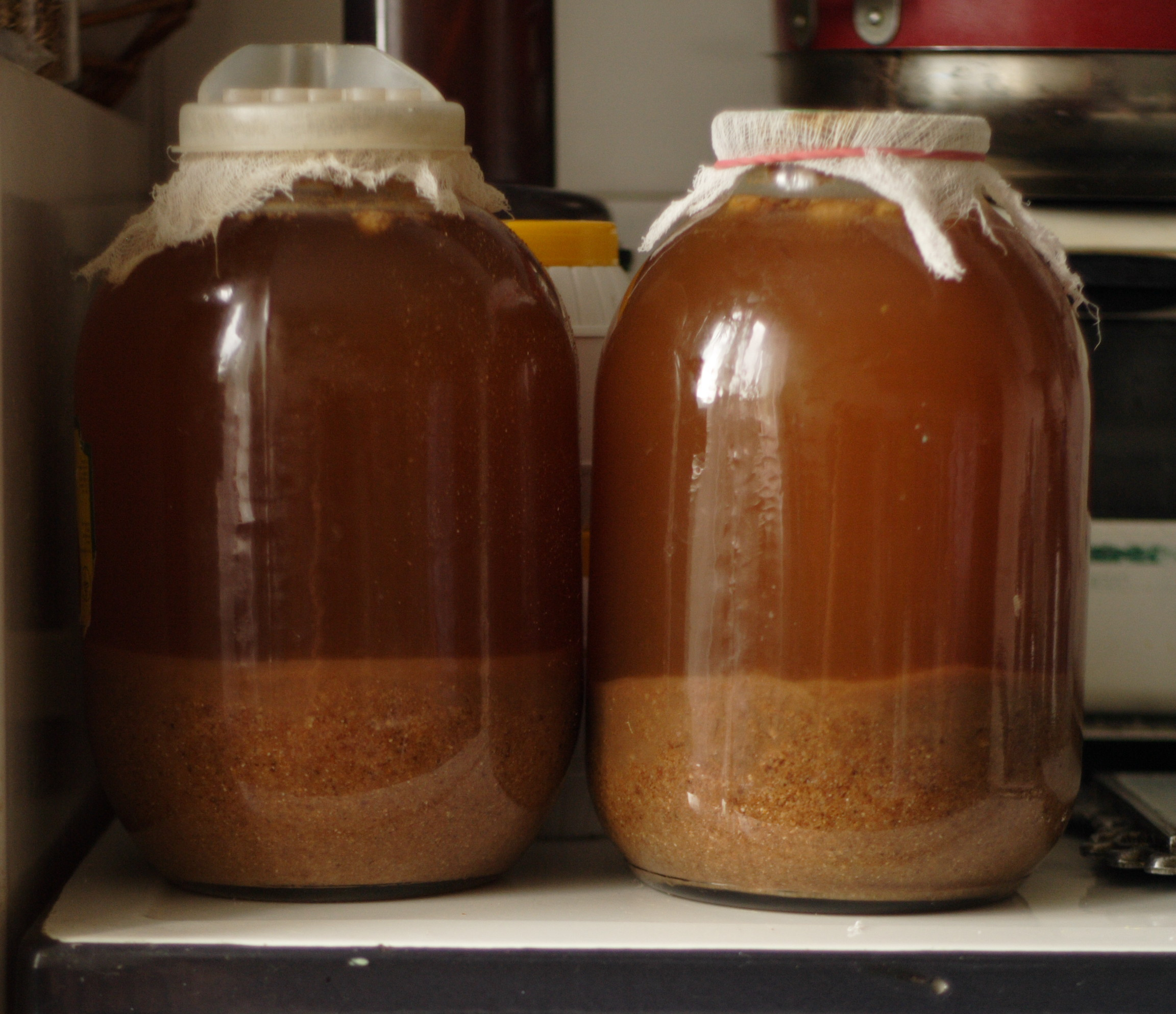
Home fermentation of kvass in glass jars

Traditionally, people use either dried rye bread or a mix of rye flour and rye malt. They soak the dried rye bread in hot water and incubate it at room temperature for 12 hours, then add bread yeast and sugar to the extract and ferment for 12 hours at 20 °C (293 K; 68 °F). Alternatively, rye flour is boiled, mixed with rye malt, sugar, and baker's yeast, and then fermented for 12 hours at 20 °C (293 K; 68 °F).

The simplest industrial method produces kvass from a wort concentrate. The concentrate is warmed and mixed with a water-and-sugar solution to create wort with a 5–7% sugar concentration, then pasteurized to stabilize it. After that, the wort is pumped into a fermentation tank, where baker's yeast and lactic acid bacteria culture is added, and the solution is fermented for 12–24 hours at 12 to 30 °C (285 to 303 K; 54 to 86 °F). Only around 1% of the extract is fermented out into ethanol, carbon dioxide, and lactic acid. Afterward, the kvass is cooled to 6 °C (279 K; 43 °F), clarified by filtration or centrifugation, and adjusted for sugar content if necessary.

Initially, it was filled in large containers from which the kvass was sold on streets, but now, the vast majority of industrially produced kvass is filled and sold in 1–3-litre plastic bottles and has a shelf life of 4–6 weeks.

Kvass is usually 0.5–1.0% alcohol by weight, but may sometimes be as high as 2.0%.

== History ==
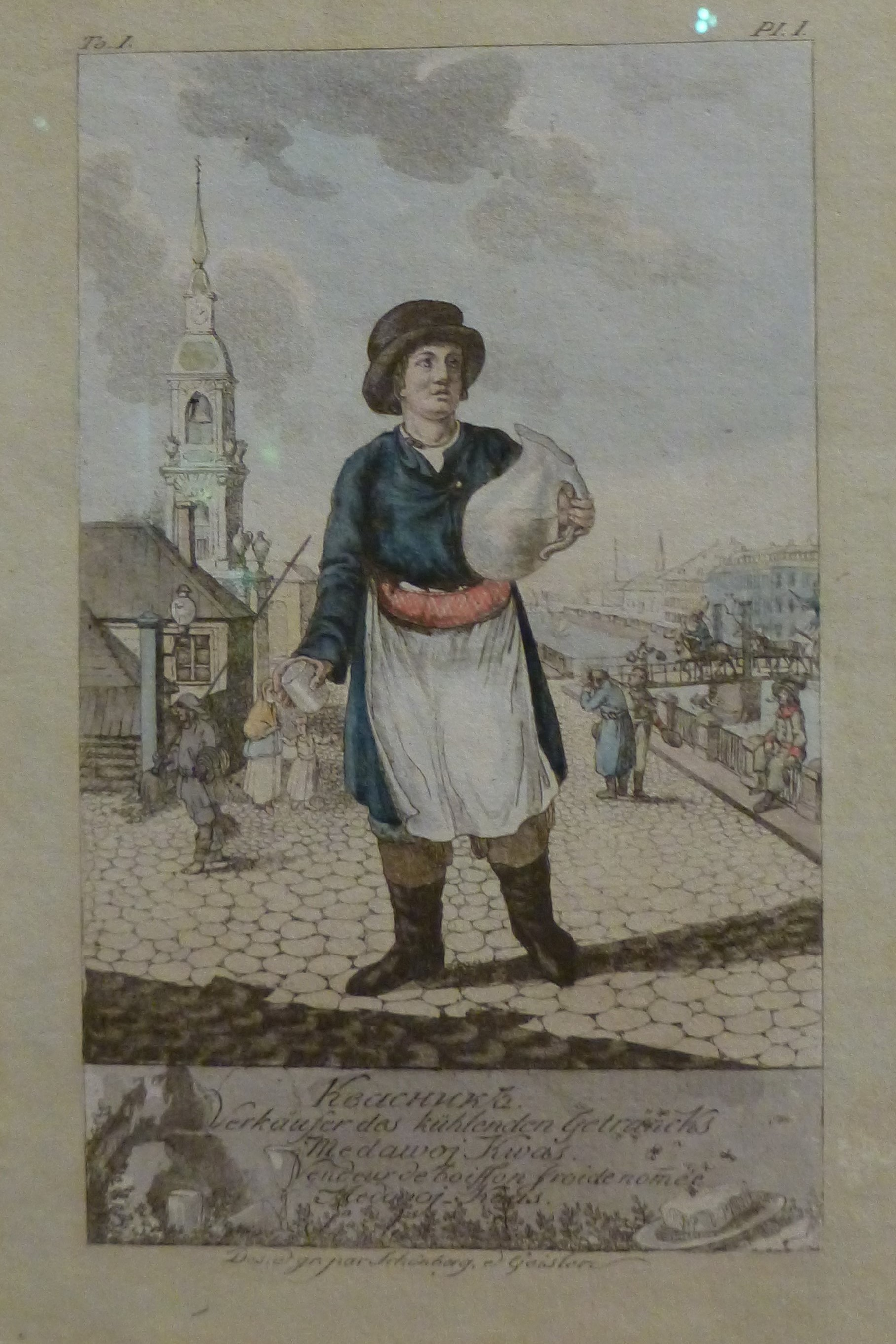
A kvass vendor (kvasnik) in Russian Empire in the late 18th century

The exact origins of kvass are unclear, and whether it was invented by Slavic people or any other Eastern European ethnicity is unknown, although some Polish sources claim that kvass was invented by Slavs. Kvass has existed in the northeastern part of Europe, where grain production is thought to have been insufficient for beer to become a daily drink. It has been known among the Early Slavs since the 10th century. Possibly invented in the Kievan Rus' and known there since at least the 10th century, kvass has become one of the symbols of East Slavic cuisine. The first written mention of kvass is found in the Primary Chronicle, describing the celebration of Vladimir the Great's baptism in 988, when kvass along with mead and food was given out to the citizens of Kiev. Kvass-making remained a daily household activity well into the 19th century.

In the second half of the 19th century, with military engagement, increasing industrialization, and large-scale projects, such as the construction of the Trans-Siberian Railway, creating a growing need to supply large numbers of people with foodstuffs for extended periods of time, kvass became commercialized; more than 150 kvass varieties, such as apple, pear, mint, lemon, chicory, raspberry, and cherry, were recorded. As commercial kvass producers began selling it in barrels on the streets, domestic kvass-making started to decline. For example, in the year ended 30 June 1912, there were 17 factories in the Governorate of Livonia, producing a total of 437,255 gallons of kvass.

In the 1890s, scientists conducted the first studies on kvass production in Kyiv, and in the 1960s, chemists in Moscow further developed commercial mass-production technology for kvass.

== By country ==
=== Belarus ===
Kvass trailer in Grodno, Belarus (2019)

Belarus has several breweries producing kvass: Alivaria Brewery, Babrujski Brovar, and Krinitsa. It also has a variety of kvass tasting and entertainment festivals. The largest show takes place in the city of Lida.

=== Estonia ===
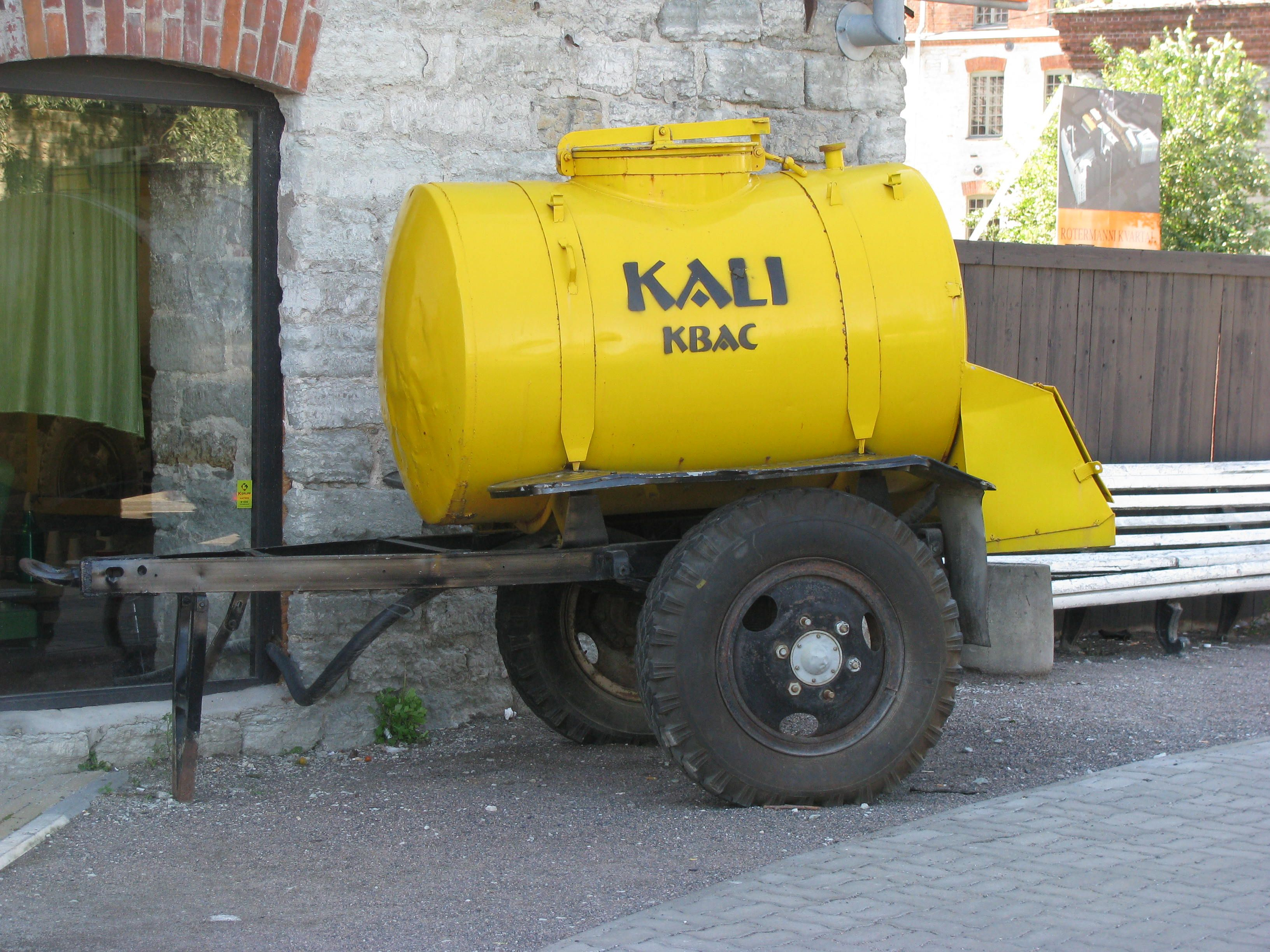
A street kvass barrel used by a vendor

In Estonia, kvass is known as kali. Initially, people made it from either brewer's spent grain or wort left to ferment in a closed container, but later they used special kvass bread (kaljaleib) or industrially produced malt concentrate. Nowadays, kali generally is industrially produced with the use of pasteurization, the addition of preservatives, and artificial carbonation.

=== Finland ===
In Finland, a fermented drink made from a mixture of rye flour and rye malt was ubiquitous in parts of Eastern Finland and was heated in the oven. It was called kalja (which can also be used to refer to small beer) or vaasa (in Eastern Finnish), while nowadays the drink is often known as kotikalja (lit. 'home kalja') and is available in many work canteens, gas stations, and lower-end restaurants.

Traditionally, households made kalja once a week from a mixture of malted and unmalted rye grains. People also sometimes used other grains, such as oats or barley; occasionally, they added leftover potatoes or pieces of bread. They mixed everything with water in a metal cauldron or clay pot and kept it warm in the oven or by the stove for at least six hours, letting the mixture darken and sweeten. Sometimes, they filtered the grain solids out through lautering. In Eastern Finland, they formed the mixture into large loaves and briefly baked them until the crust turned brown. They mixed the porridge or pieces of malt bread with water in a wooden cask and fermented it for one or two days with a previous batch, a sourdough starter, spontaneously, or, more recently, commercial baker's yeast. In the early 20th century, as sugar became more readily available, it began replacing the malting process, and modern kalja is made from dark rye malt, sugar, and baker's yeast.

=== Latvia ===
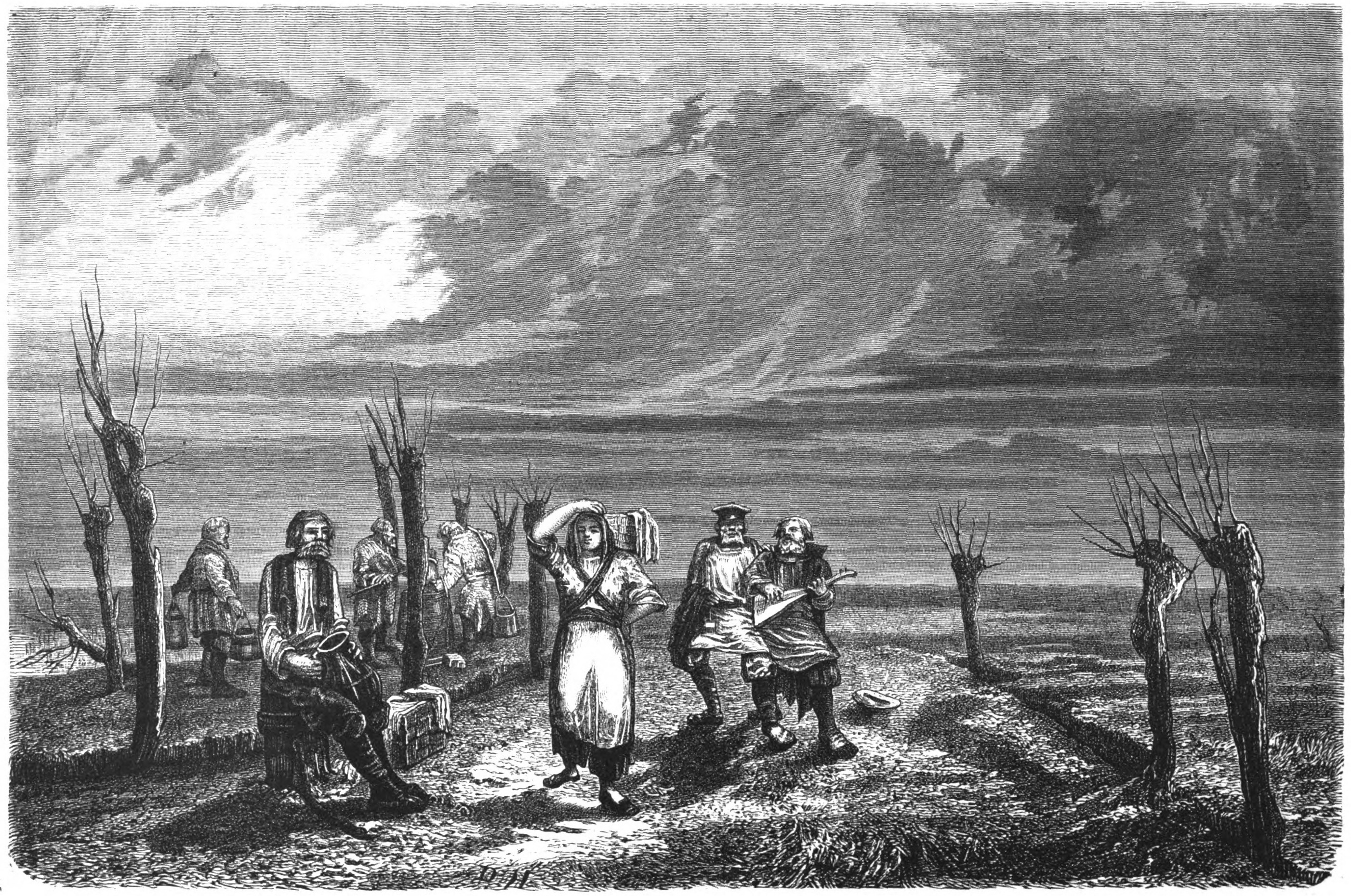
A 19th century engraving by Dessin de d'Henriet depicting kvass vendors in Livonia

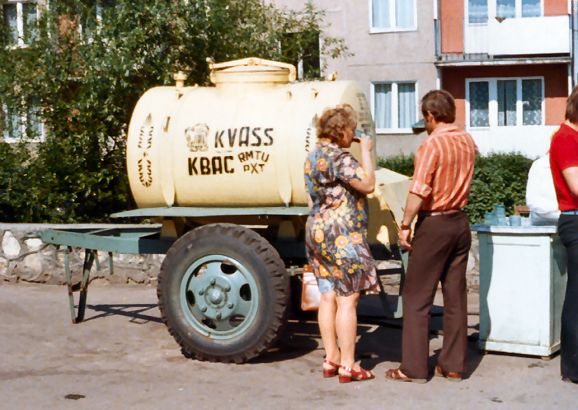
A kvass street vendor in Rīga (1977)

In Latvian, kvass was also called dzersis. After the dissolution of the Soviet Union in 1991, the street vendors disappeared from the streets of Latvia due to new health laws that banned its sale on the street. Economic disruptions forced many kvass factories to close. The Coca-Cola Company moved in and began quickly dominating the soft drink market. In 1998, the local soft drink industry adapted by selling bottled kvass and launching aggressive marketing campaigns. This sales surge was driven by the fact that kvass sold for about half the price of Coca-Cola. In just three years, kvass accounted for as much as 30% of Latvia's soft drink market, while Coca-Cola's market share fell from 65% to 44%. The Coca-Cola Company posted losses of about $ 1 million in Latvia in 1999 and 2000. Coca-Cola responded by purchasing kvass manufacturers and producing kvass at its own soft drink plants.

On 30 September 2010, the Saeima (parliament) adopted quality and classification requirements for kvass, defining it as "a beverage obtained by fermenting a mixture of kvass wort with a yeast of microorganism cultures to which sugar and other food sources and food additives are added or not added after the fermentation" with a maximum ABV of 1.2 percent, and differentiating it from an unfermented non-alcoholic mixture of grain product extract, water, flavourings, preservatives, and other ingredients, which is designated as a "kvass (malt) beverage".

In 2014, Latvian kvass producers won seven medals at the Russian Beverage exposition in Moscow, with Ilgezeem's Porter Tanheiser kvass winning two gold medals. In 2019, Iļģuciema kvass ranked second in the Most Loved Latvian Beverage Brand Top, and first in the subsequent 2020 top.

=== Lithuania ===
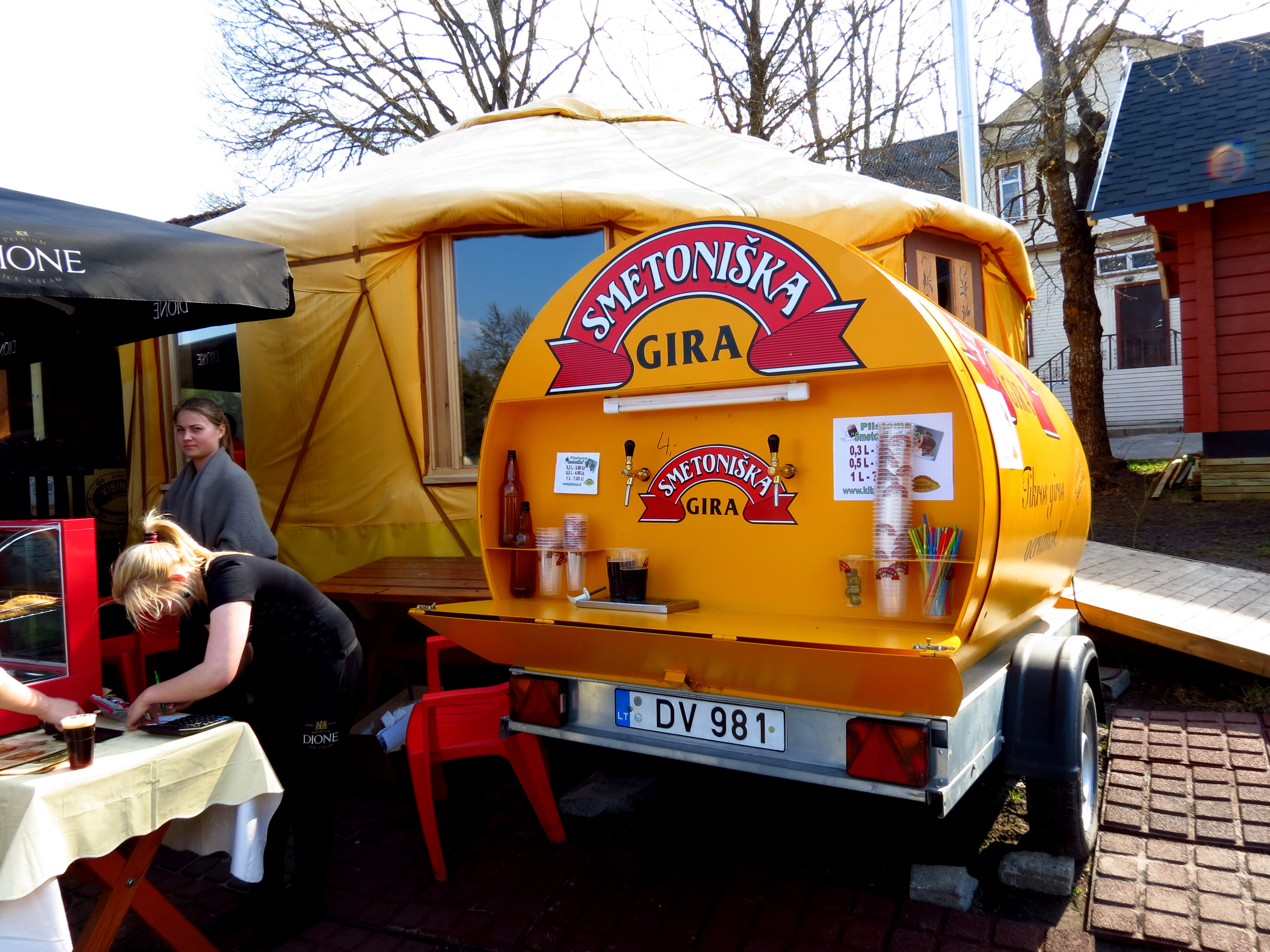
A Lithuanian kvass barrel

In Lithuania, kvass is known as gira and is widely available in bottles and drafts. The first written records of kvass and kvass recipes in Lithuania appeared in the 16th century. Many restaurants in Lithuania make their own kvass, which they sell on the premises. Some brands of mass-produced Lithuanian kvass are also sold in Poland. Strictly speaking, gira can be made from anything fermentable—such as caraway tea, beetroot juice, or berries—but it is made mainly from black bread, or barley or rye malt. In rural Lithuania, people traditionally made gira with ingredients like rye flour, bread, apples, or berries. The simplest version fermented dried bread or bread crusts with dried apples, then poured hot water over the mixture. Another method used sprouted, dried, and ground rye malt, which they mixed with hot water and yeast to ferment. In Žemaitija, people made gira by first brewing beer, then boiling the leftover malt with water, yeast, hops, and sugar. They also simmered juniper or rowan berries multiple times, changing the water between boils, and let it ferment for several days. In Aukštaitija, people sometimes used gira in soups.

=== Poland ===
Varieties of natural kwas chlebowy

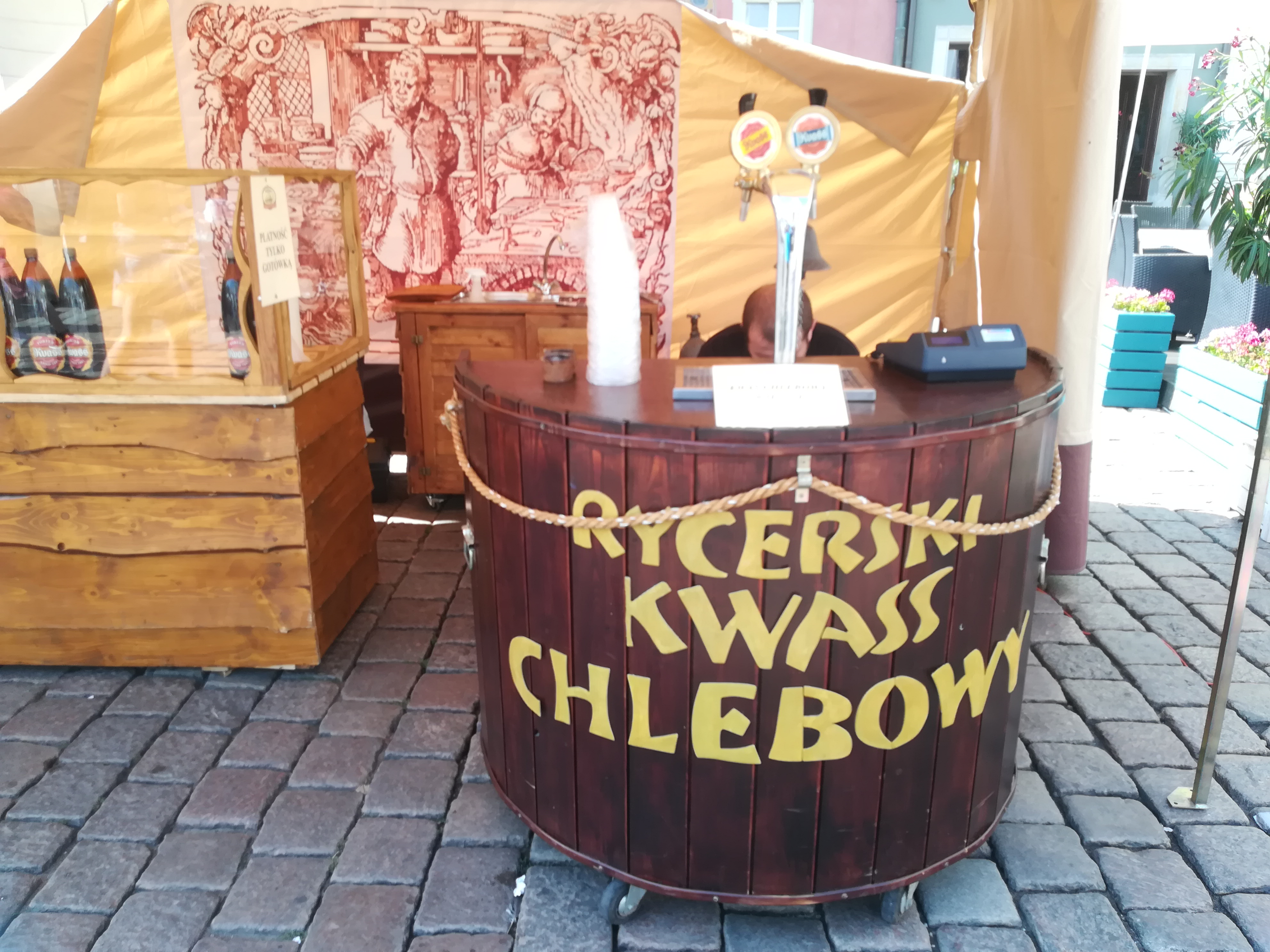
Kvass tap at a festival in Poznań

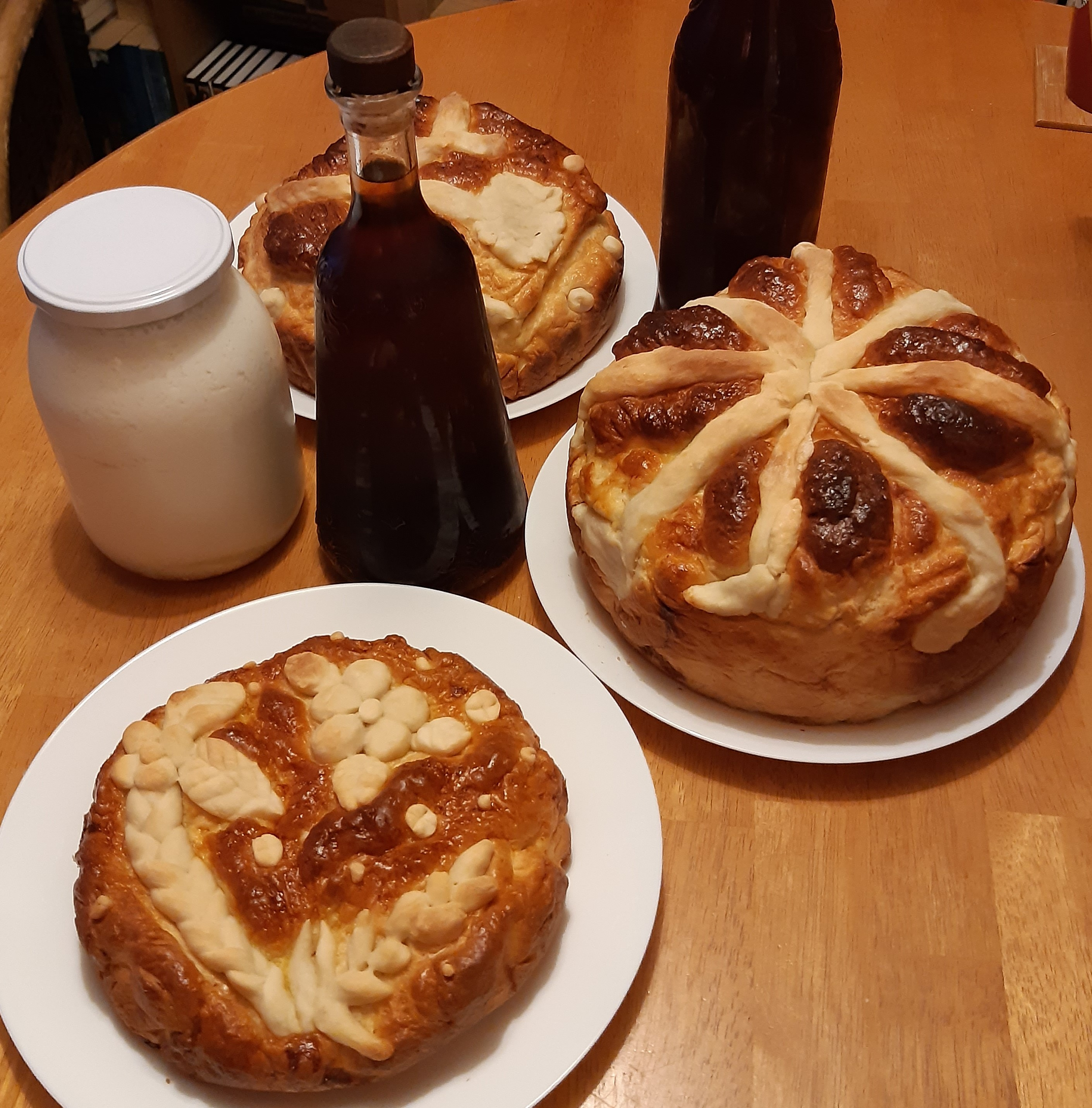
Polish kvass served alongside kefir, kolach and korovai

Kvass may have appeared in Poland as early as the 10th century, it quickly became a popular beverage thanks to its easy and cheap method of production as well as its thirst-quenching and digestion-aiding qualities. By the time of Jogaila's rule, kvass was universal. It was at first commonly drunk by peasants in the eastern parts of the country, but eventually the drink spread to the szlachta. One example of this is kwas chlebowy sapieżyński kodeński, an old type of Polish kvass that is still sold as a contemporary brand. Its origins trace back to the 1500s, when Jan Sapieha founded Kodeń on land granted by the Polish king. He then bought the mills and 24 surrounding villages from their previous landowners. The Polish szlachta then came to know kvass for its supposed healing qualities. Throughout the 19th century, kvass remained popular among Poles in Congress Poland under Imperial Russia and in Austrian Galicia, especially in rural areas. Up until the 19th century, recipes for local variants of kvass remained well-guarded secrets of families, religious orders, and monasteries.

Industrial-scale beverage production in Poland dates to the interwar period, when the Polish state regained independence as the Second Polish Republic. In interwar Poland, magnates of the Polish drinks market, such as the Varsovian brewery Haberbusch i Schiele and the Karpiński company, brewed and sold kvass in large quantities. Kvass remained particularly popular in eastern Poland. However, with the collapse of many prewar businesses and much of the Polish industry during World War II, kvass lost popularity in the aftermath of the war. It also gradually fell out of favor throughout the 20th century as mass-produced soft drinks and carbonated water entered the Polish market. In the early 21st century, kvass experienced a renaissance in Poland due to the heightened interest in healthy diets, natural products, and traditions.

Kvass is available in some supermarkets and grocery stores, where it is known in Polish as kwas chlebowy ([kvas xlɛbɔvɨ]). Commercial bottled versions are the most common variant, as some companies specialize in manufacturing a more modern version of the drink (some variants are manufactured in Poland, while others are imported from neighboring countries, with Lithuania and Ukraine as the most popular sources). However, old recipes for a traditional version of kvass exist. Some of them originate from eastern Poland; others from more central regions include adding honey for flavour. Although commercial kvass is much easier to find in Polish shops, Polish manufacturers of more natural and healthier variants of kvass have become increasingly popular both within and outside of the country's borders. A less healthy alternative of quick-to-make variants using kvass concentrate can also be purchased in shops. One colloquial Polish name for kwas chlebowy is wiejska oranżada ('rural orangeade'). In some Polish villages, such as Zaława and its surroundings, kvass was traditionally produced on every farm.

=== Russia ===
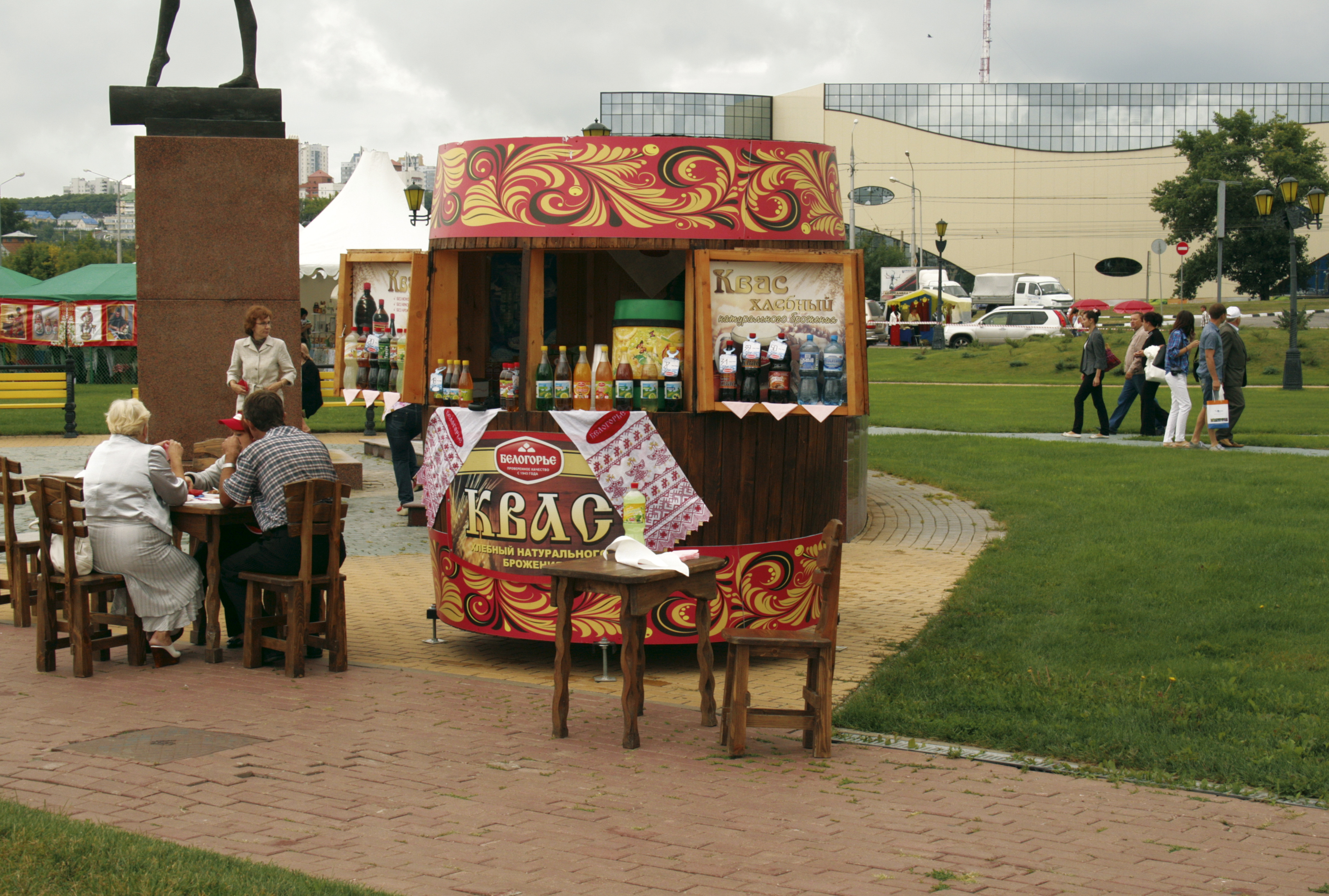
A kvass street vendor in Belgorod, Russia, 2013

Although the massive flood of western soft drinks after the fall of the USSR, such as Coca-Cola and Pepsi, substantially shrank the market share of kvass in Russia, in recent years it has regained its original popularity, often marketed as a national soft drink or "patriotic" alternative to the famous Coca-Cola drink. For example, the Russian company Nikola has promoted its kvass brand with an advertising campaign emphasizing "anti-cola-nisation." Moscow-based Business Analytica reported in 2008 that bottled kvass sales had tripled since 2005 and estimated that per capita kvass consumption in Russia would reach three liters in 2008. Between 2005 and 2007, cola's share of the Moscow soft drink market fell from 37% to 32%. Meanwhile, kvass's share more than doubled over the same period, reaching 16% in 2007. In response, Coca-Cola launched its own kvass brand in May 2008. This marked the first time a foreign company made a meaningful entry into Russia's kvass market. Pepsi has also signed an agreement with a Russian kvass manufacturer to act as a distribution agent. New storage and distribution technologies, along with heavy advertising, have driven this surge in popularity; since 2004, three new major brands have been introduced.

Market shares for Russia (2014)

Company	Brand name	Share [%]
Deka	Никола Nikola	39
Ochakovo	Очаковский Ochakovsky	18.9
PepsiCo	Русский дар Russky dar	11.6
Carlsberg Group	Хлебный край Khlebny kray	5.5
Coca-Cola, Inc.	Кружка и бочка Kruzhka i bochka	2.1
Other		22.9

=== Sweden ===
Swedes also made kvass, which was known as bröddricka (lit. 'bread drink'). However, it was likely limited to areas where rye bread was standard, rather than crispbread, which was more common in Western Sweden and didn't go stale. Bröddricka was still being made in Öland farms up until 1935.

=== China ===
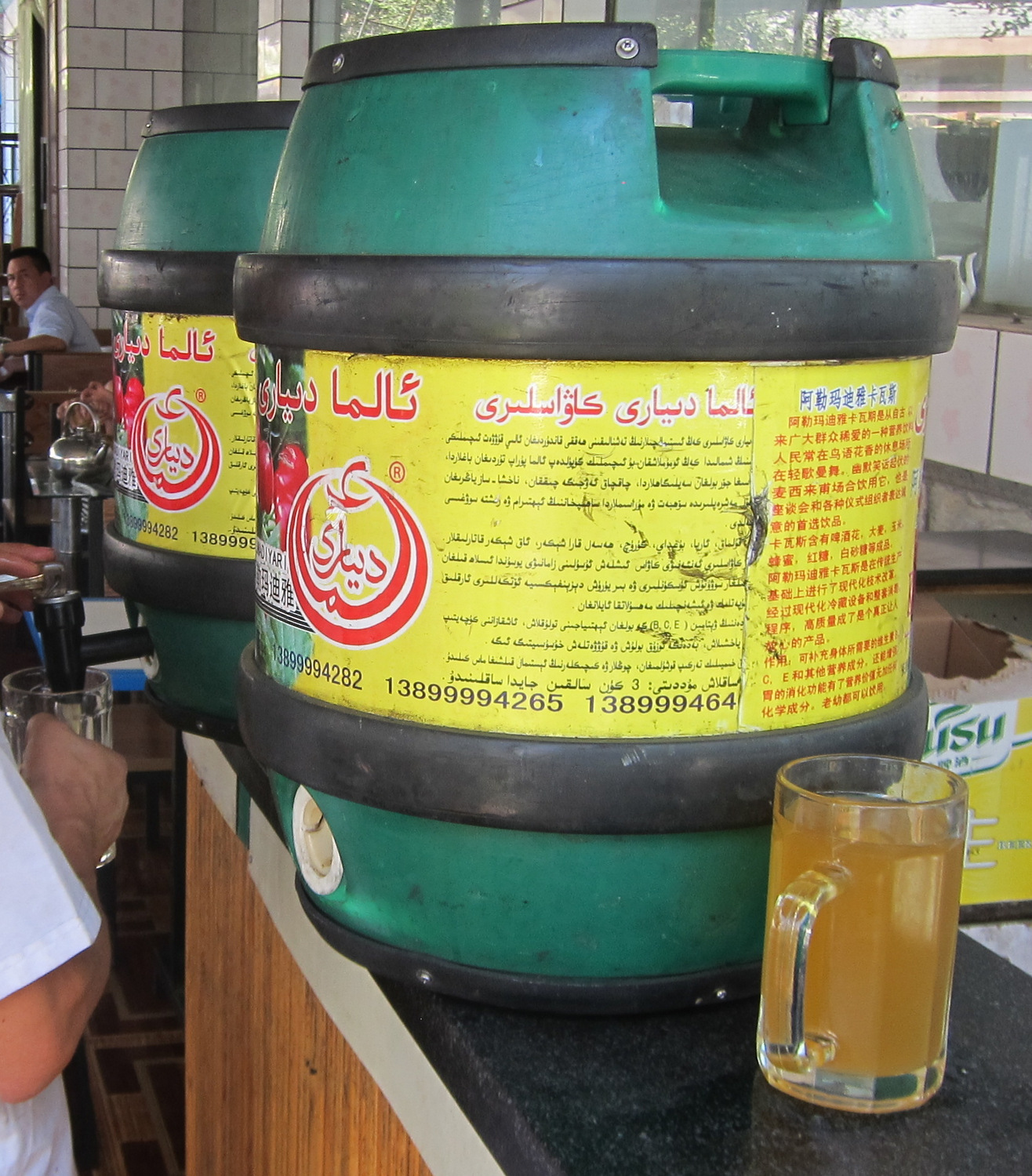
Kavas served in a restaurant in Ürümqi, Xinjiang

In the mid-19th century, people in Xinjiang introduced kvass, where it became known as kavas (Chinese: 格瓦斯; pinyin: géwǎsī) and eventually became one of the region's signature drinks. It is usually consumed cold together with barbecue. In 1900, Russian merchant Ivan Churin founded Harbin Churin Food (Chinese: 秋林; pinyin: Qiūlín) in Harbin, offering kvass and other specialities, and by 2009, the company was already producing 5,000 tons of kvass a year, making up 90% of the local market. In 2011, it moved its kvass factory to Tianjin, increasing its sales to 20,000 tons in the first year.

=== Elsewhere ===
Following the influx of immigrants in the UK due to the 2004 enlargement of the European Union, shops selling cuisine and beverages from Central and Eastern Europe were established, many of which stock imported (primarily pasteurized) kvass. As a result, since then a number of different flavors of non-pasteurized kvass, fermented using sourdough starter culture, have also become available in the UK in 2023. In recent years, kvass has also become more popular in Serbia.

== Nutritional composition ==
Naturally fermented kvass contains 5.9%±0.02 carbohydrates, of which 5.7%±0.02 are sugars (mostly fructose, glucose, and maltose), as well as 0.71±0.09, 1.28±0.12, and 18.14±0.48 mg/100 g of thiamine, riboflavin, and niacin respectively. In addition to that, 19 different aroma volatile compounds have also been identified in naturally fermented kvass, most notably 4-penten-2-ol (10.05×10^{7} PAU), which has a fruity odour; carvone (2.28×10^{7} PAU) originating from caraway fruits used as an ingredient in rye bread; and ethyl octanoate (1.03×10^{7} PAU), which has an odour of fruit and fat.

Traditional kvass made from rye wholemeal bread has been found to have, on average, twice the dietary fiber content, 60% more antioxidant activity (due to the addition of caramel and citric acid to the bread), and three times less reducing sugar content than industrially produced kvass.

Historically, alcohol by volume (ABV) in kvass varied with ingredients, microbial flora, temperature, and fermentation time, but today it is usually no higher than 1.5%. The wide availability and consumption of kvass, including by children of all ages, together with the lacking indication of ABV for kvass on the labels and in advertisements, has been named a possible contributor to chronic alcoholism in the former Soviet Union.

== Use ==
Beyond drinking, families also use kvass as the base for many dishes. Traditional cold summertime soups of Russian cuisine, such as okroshka, botvinya, and tyurya, are based on kvass.

== Cultural references ==
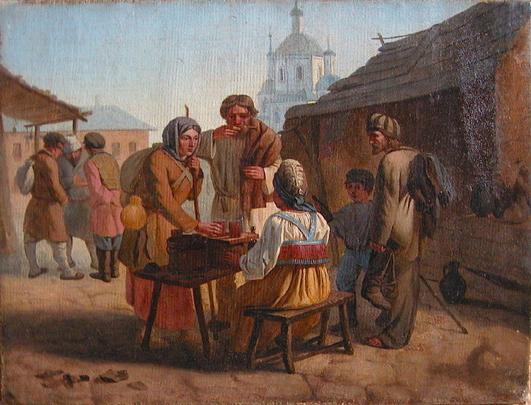
Vassiliy Kalistov, Street vending of kvass (1862), Chuvash State Art Museum, Russia

The name of Kvasir, a wise being in Norse mythology, is possibly related to kvass.

There is a Russian expression, Перебиваться с хлеба на квас (literally 'to clamber from bread to kvass'), which means 'to live from hand to mouth' or to 'scrape by' referring to the frugal practice amongst the poor peasants of making kvass from stale leftovers of rye bread. Another kvass-related term in Russian is "kvass patriotism" (квасной патриотизм) dating back to an 1823 letter by the Russian poet Pyotr Vyazemsky who defined it as "unqualified praise of everything that is your own".

In the Polish language, several traditional sayings reference kwas chlebowy. An old Polish folk rhyming song also exists. It traces kvass's history in the country, drunk by generations of Polish reapers as a thirst-quenching beverage during hard work in the harvest season, long before it became popular as a medicinal drink among the szlachta. The song goes as follows:

Original Polish lyrics

Od dawien dawna słynie napój zdrowy:
kwas chlebowy,
pajda chleba za pazuchę,
bukłak kwasu
i chłop gotów w pole.
W gorącą posuchę.

Translation:
English translation

A healthy drink has long been renowned:
bread kvass,
a chunk of bread below the armpit,
a goatskin of kvass
and the peasant is ready for the fields.
Into a hot drought.

In the Polish village of Zaława, a customary game known as wulkan ('volcano') is associated with the beverage. Fermentation of sugars makes kvass slightly carbonated; thus, when shaken or heated, it can cause the liquid to rise suddenly and rapidly out of an open vessel. Playing wulkan involves vigorously shaking a bottle of kvass shortly before handing it to someone else to drink; the sudden "shooting out" of the beverage onto the person opening the bottle entertains the youth of Zaława and is a well-known prank during regional festivities.

In Tolstoy's War and Peace, French soldiers who enter Moscow know about kvass, enjoy it, and call it "pig's lemonade". In Sholem Aleichem's Motl, Peysi the Cantor's Son, diluted kvass is the focus of one of Motl's older brother's get-rich-quick schemes.

== Non-bread varieties ==
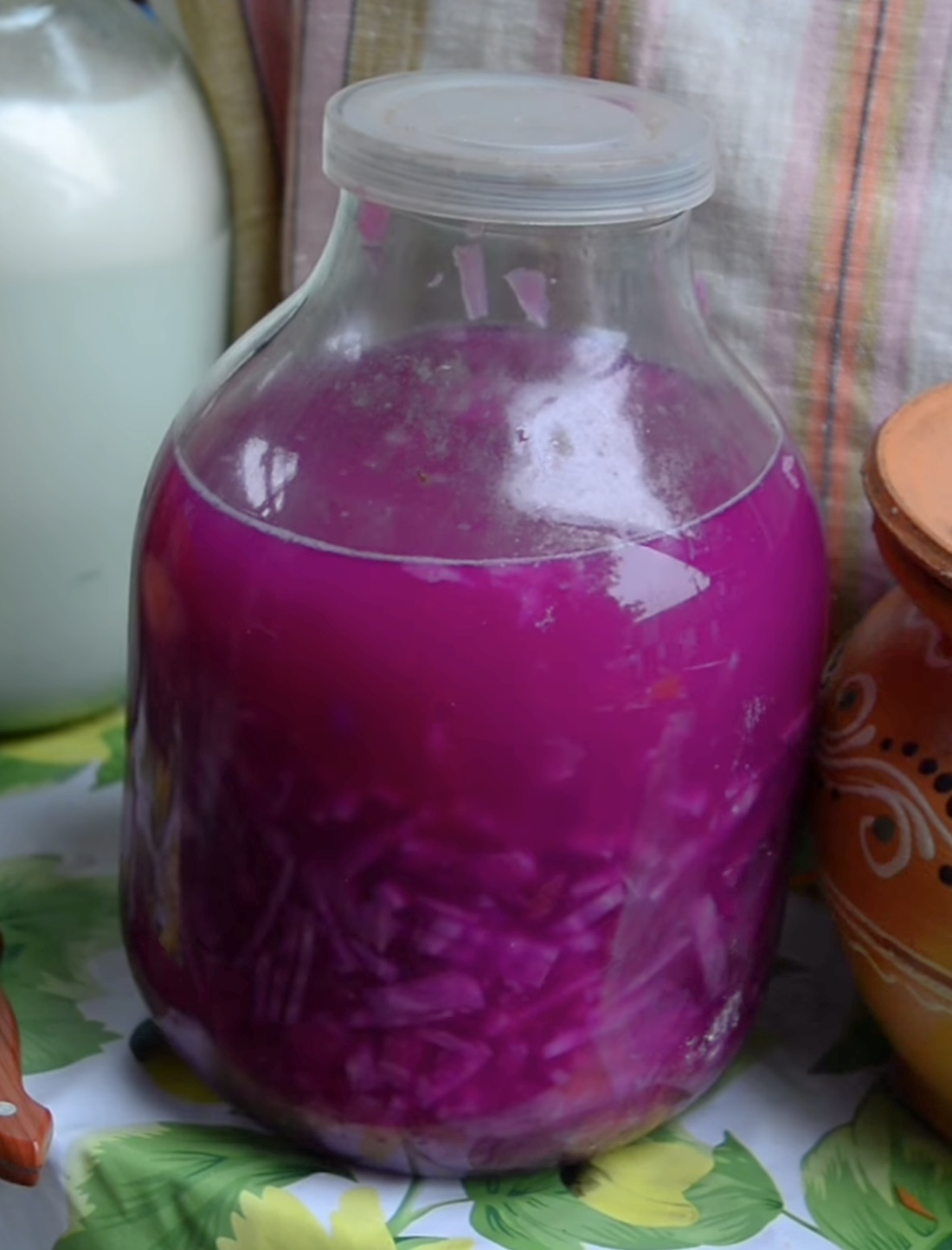
Beetroot kvas

A traditional Ukrainian drink was pear and apple kvas, made by soaking dried fruit in water for two months. This drink was popular at banquets and also kept people from drinking low-quality water. Another popular traditional specialty of Ukraine is beetroot kvas, which could be consumed as a drink or used as an ingredient of other dishes, most famously borshch. Some types of non-bread kvass have been produced to be sold in the United States including beet and ginger and sauerkraut varieties.

== See also ==
- Small beer
- Borș (bran)
- Boza
- Brottrunk
- Malta
- Podpiwek
- Pruno
- Rejuvelac
