= Ochakov (disambiguation) =

Ochakov or Ochakiv is a city in Ukraine.

Ochakov may also refer to:

- Ochakov (crater), a crater on Mars
- Russian cruiser Ochakov, a 1971 Kara-class cruiser of the Russian Navy
- Russian cruiser Ochakov (1902) known for the 1905 uprising under captain Pyotr Schmidt

== See also ==
- Ochakovo (disambiguation), a station of the Moscow Metro
