= Władysław Szlengel =

Polish poet, journalist, and stage actor (1912–1943)

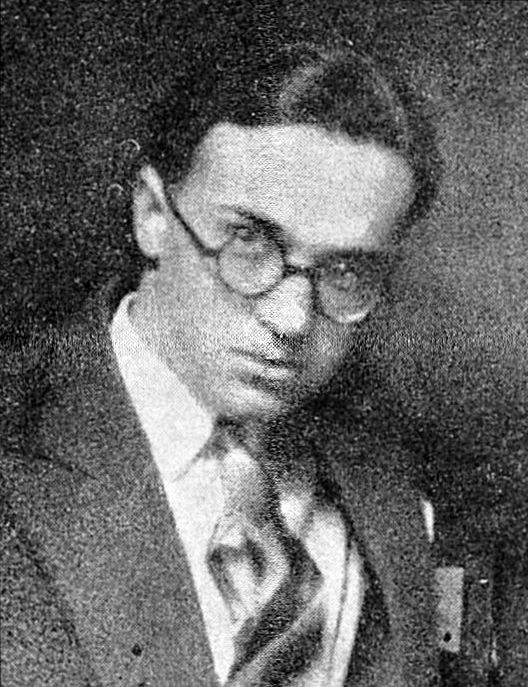
- Born: 1912; Warsaw
- Died: 8 May 1943 (aged 28–29); Warsaw
- Occupations: poet lyricist journalist

Władysław Szlengel (1912 – 8 May 1943) was a Polish poet, lyricist, journalist, and stage actor of Jewish descent.

== Life ==
Władysław Szlengel was the son of a Warsaw painter who made film posters. In 1930, Władysław Szlengel graduated from the Merchants' Assembly Trade School of the City of Warsaw.

During his school years, he first discovered his talent for rhyming. He published his texts in the student newspaper, but soon established relations with a number of dailies and weeklies.

Szlengel wrote only in Polish. By 1939, he was one of the most recognizable lyricists in Poland, and the author of several popular songs. He had also published satirical articles in the weekly Szpilki, and political articles in Robotnik and in the Lwów newspaper Sygnały.

He took part in the 1939 defence of Warsaw. Later, he moved with his wife to Białystok, at the time occupied by the Soviets. There, he worked as director of the local Miniature Theatre. In 1940, he returned to Warsaw. On 16 November 1940, Waliców Street, where he lived, was made part of the Warsaw Ghetto.

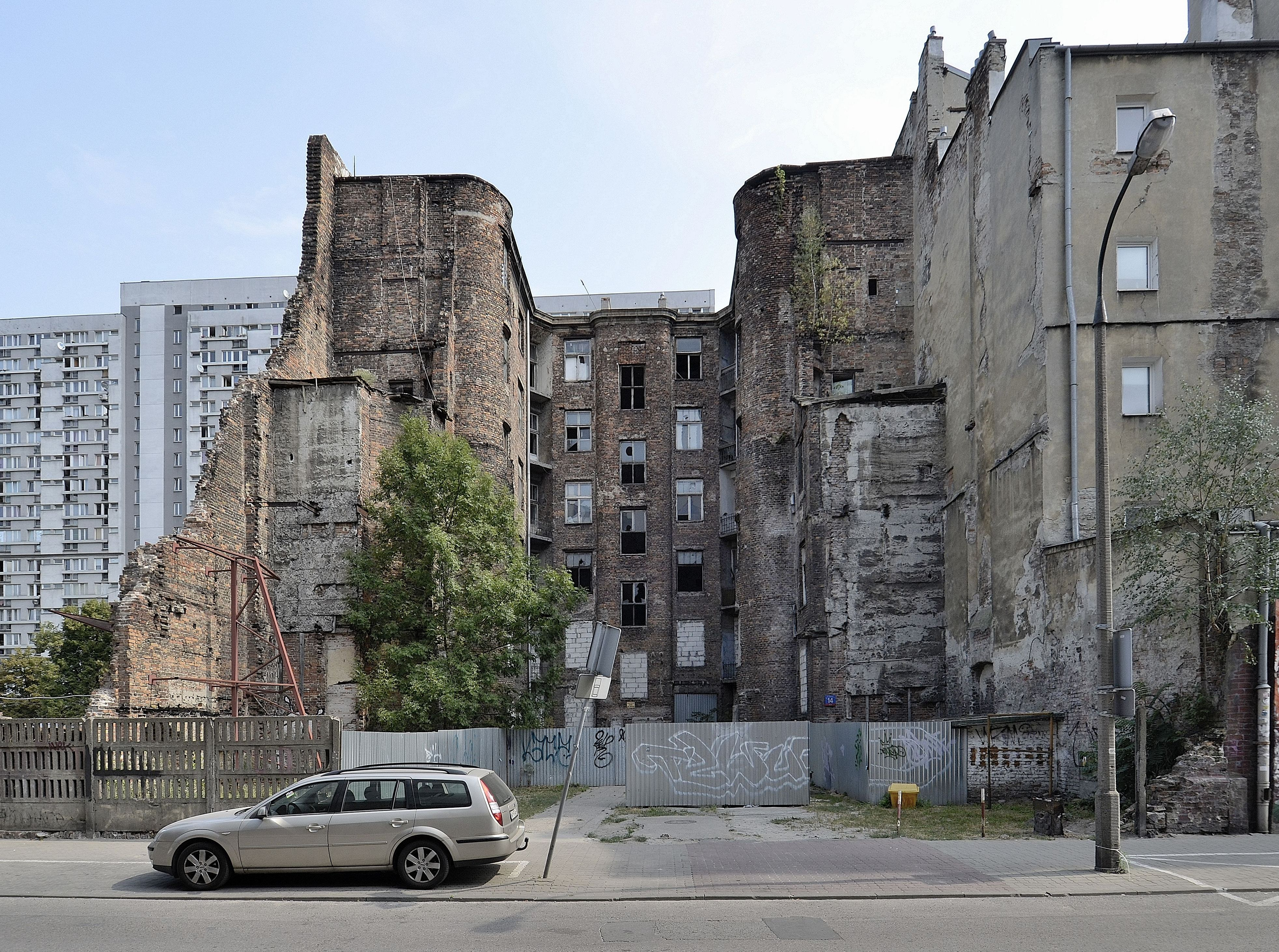
14 Waliców Street, Warsaw

He became an organizer of cultural life in the district of the Ghetto. In his poetry, Szlengel described the everyday experiences and suffering of the Jews, but didn't shy away from irony. Many of his poems document the Holocaust, including "Umschlagplatz" procedures, transports to Treblinka extermination camp, and circumstances of Janusz Korczak's death. During his confinement to the Ghetto, he sought in vain to find refuge on the "Aryan" side, and collaborated with Oyneg Shabbos.

He and his wife died during the Warsaw Ghetto Uprising, murdered by the Germans after being discovered in the bunker at Świętojerska Street 36, where they had a hiding place.

== See also ==
- List of Poles
