= Alivaria Brewery =

Brewery in Minsk, Belarus

Olivaria Brewery
- Location: (Belarus) Republic of Belarus; 220002 Minsk; Kiseleva str., 30
- Opened: 1864
- Employees: 580
- Website: www.alivaria.by

Active beers
Name	Type
Data 1864
On Ice
Extra (Russian: Экстра)
Non-alcoholic (Безалкогольное)
Troickoe (Троицкое)
Gold (Золотое)
Strong (Крепкое)
Ten (Десятка)
Brovar light (Бровар лёгкое)
Brovar classic (Бровар классическое)
Brovar strong (Бровар крепкое)
Alivaria porter (Аливария Портер)

Seasonal beers
Name	Type
Olivaria X-mas (Аливария рождественское)

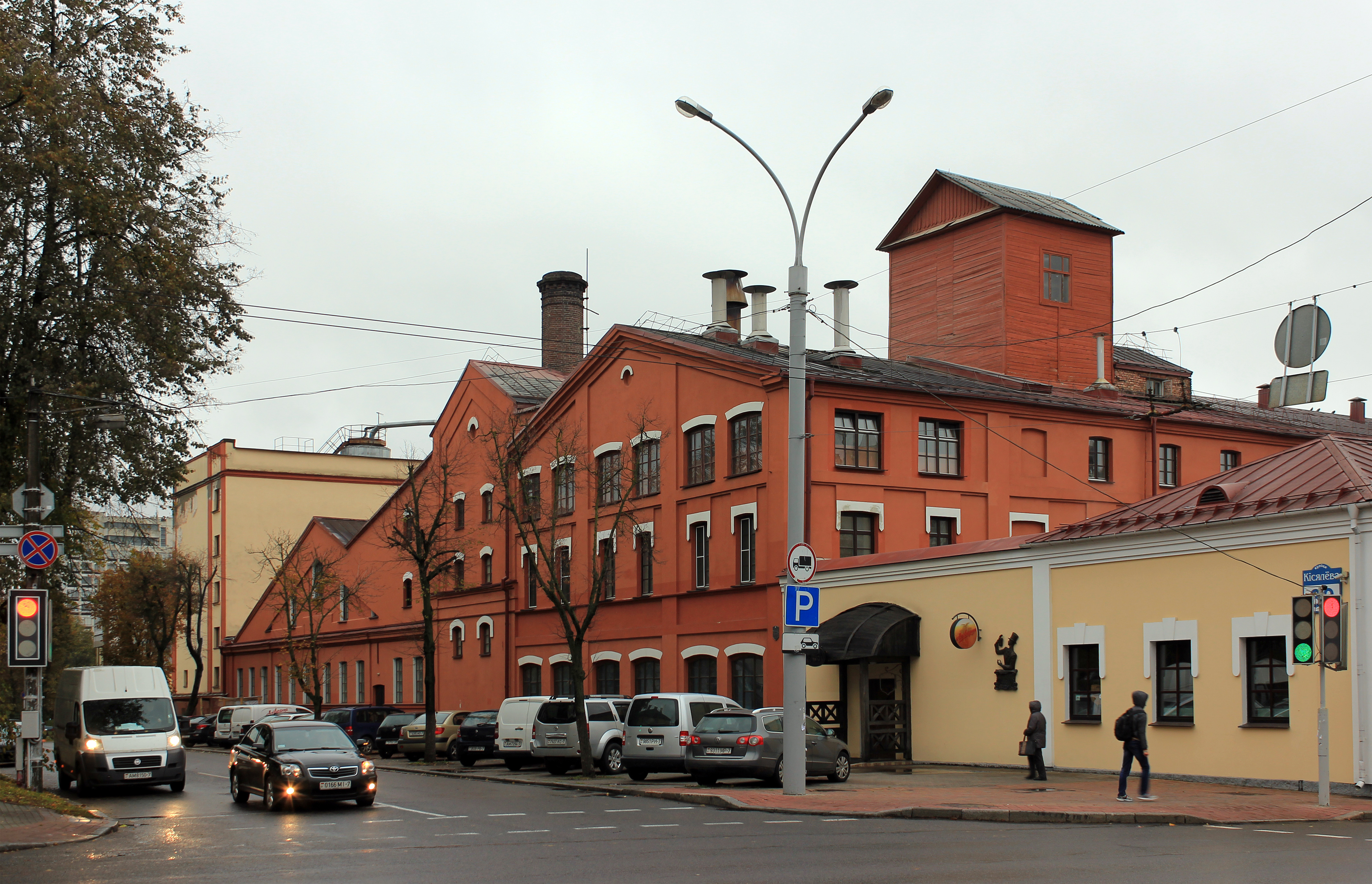
Olivaria Brewery buildings

Olivaria brewery (also known as Olivaria or Alivaria, Belarusian: ААТ Піўзавод Аліварыя) is one of the oldest breweries in Belarus, and is the oldest of presently existent breweries in the country. It was founded in 1864 in Minsk. The brewery has a 29% market share in the beer market in Belarus, and its primary product, Alivaria-brand beer has a market share of around 18%. Production increased by 43% in 2008, and in 2011, the brewery was in third place in the market share of beer in Belarus.

As of May 2015, Carlsberg Group holds 67.8% of shares in the brewery, and the European Bank for Reconstruction and Development holds 21% of shares. Remaining shares are owned by various individuals. European Bank for Reconstruction and Development financed the brewery to assist in its expansion and modernization.

== History ==
It began operations on January 29, 1864 in Minsk. The brewery was nationalized in 1917, but become a joint stock company in 1994.

== Varieties ==
Olivaria Brewery's primary product is Alivaria-brand beer, which has a market share of around 18% in Belarus. It also specialises in the production of kvass.

== See also ==
- Baltic Beverages Holding
