= Kvass barrel =

Mobile vessel for transportating kvass

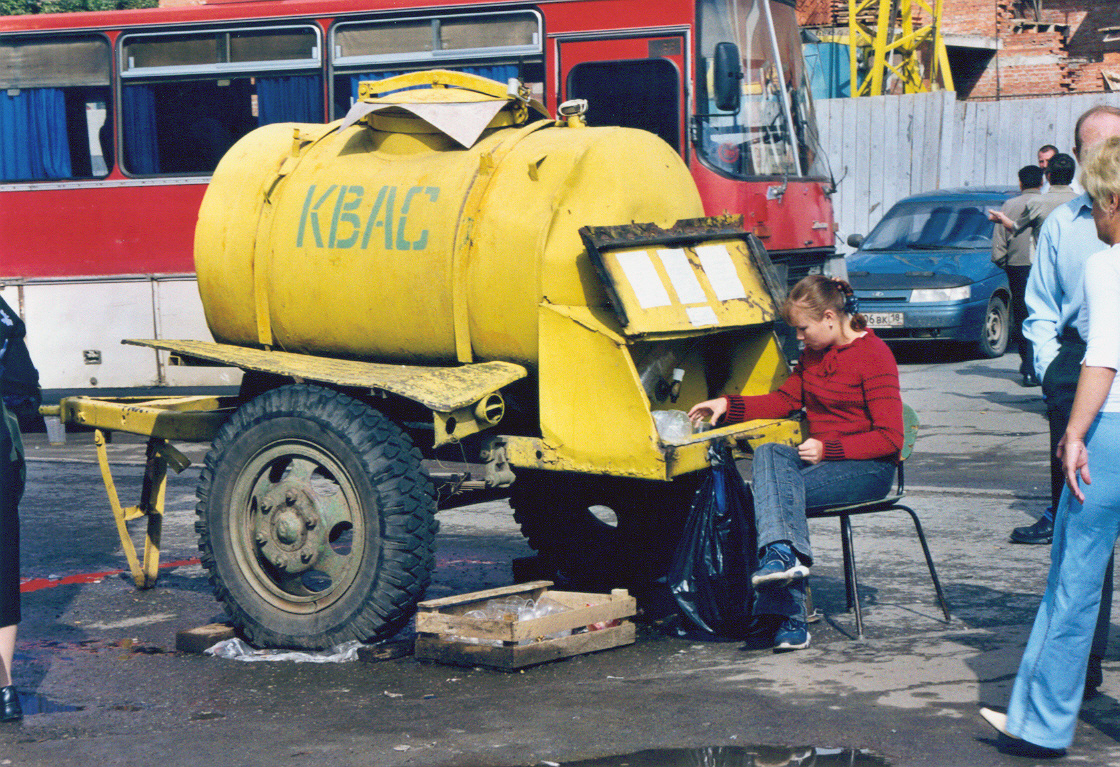
Kvass barrel in Izhevsk, Udmurtia, Russia

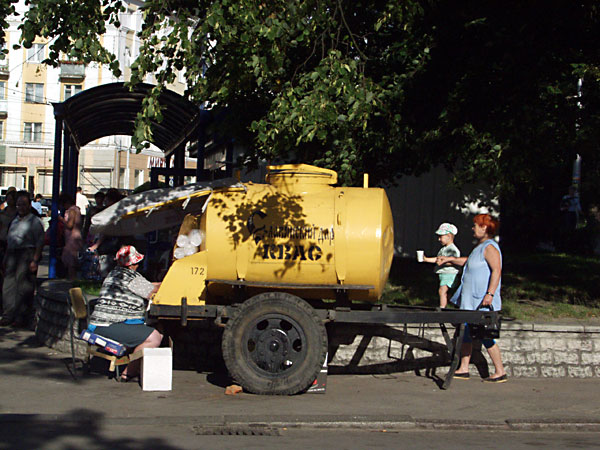
Kvass barrel in Kaliningrad, Russia

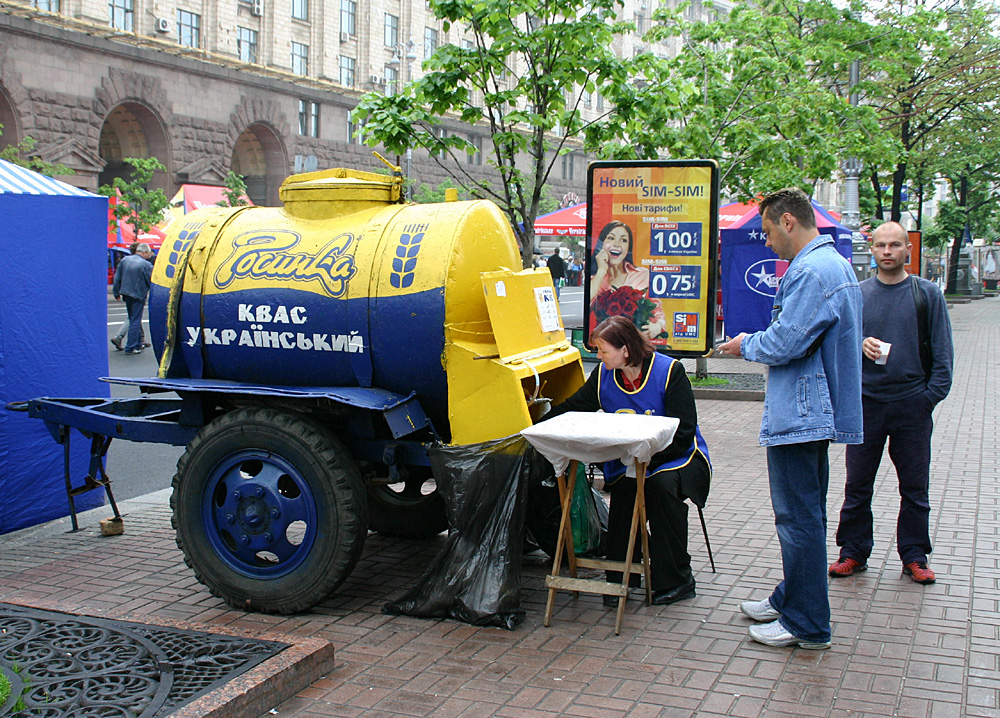
Selling of kvass from barrel in Kyiv, Ukraine

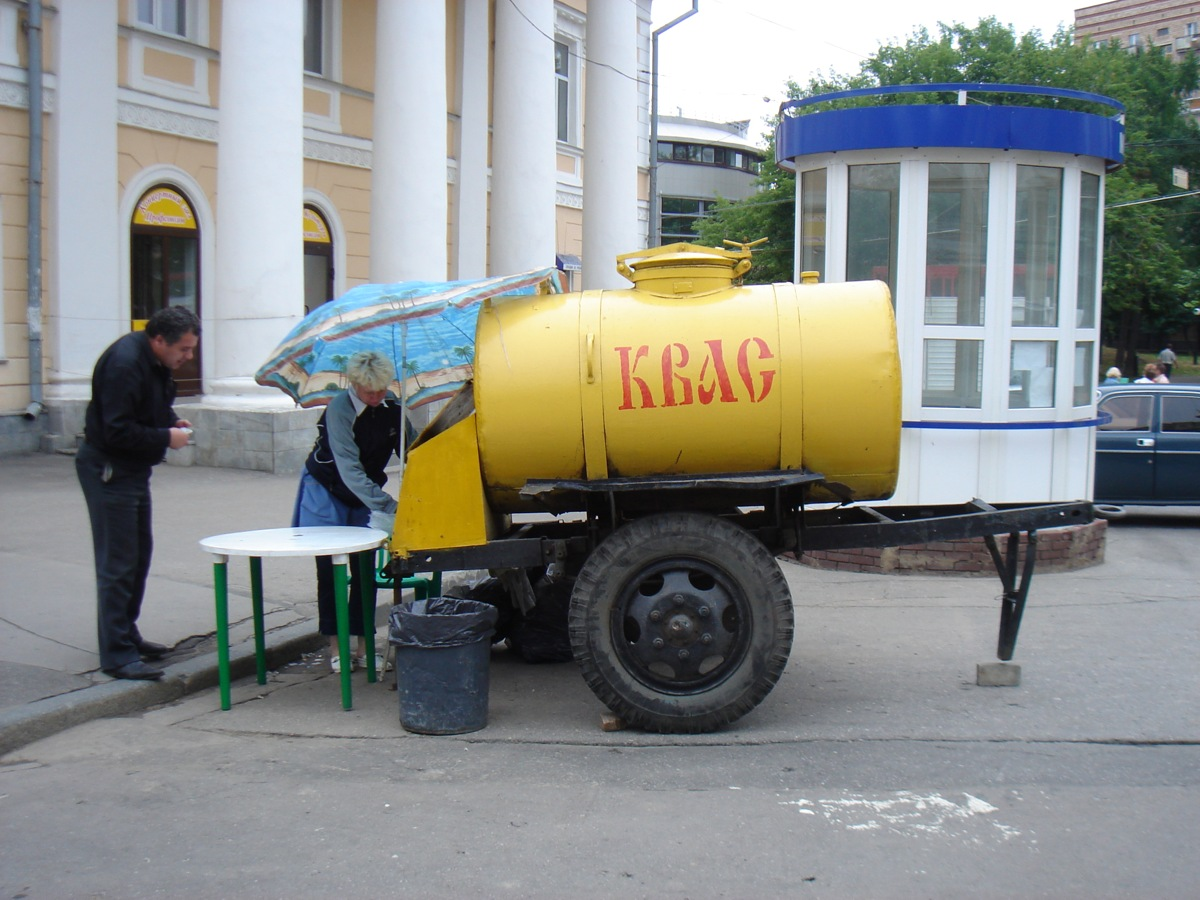
Selling of kvass in Nizhny Novgorod, Russia

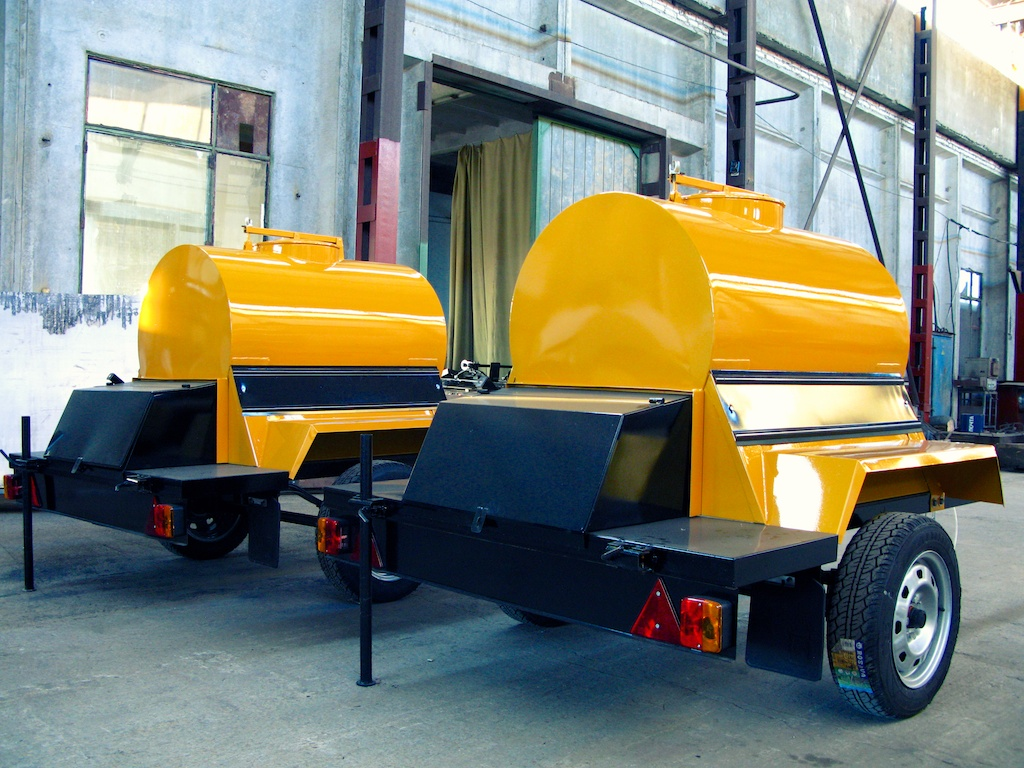
Kvass barrels at Mak-A Plant in Volgodonsk, Russia

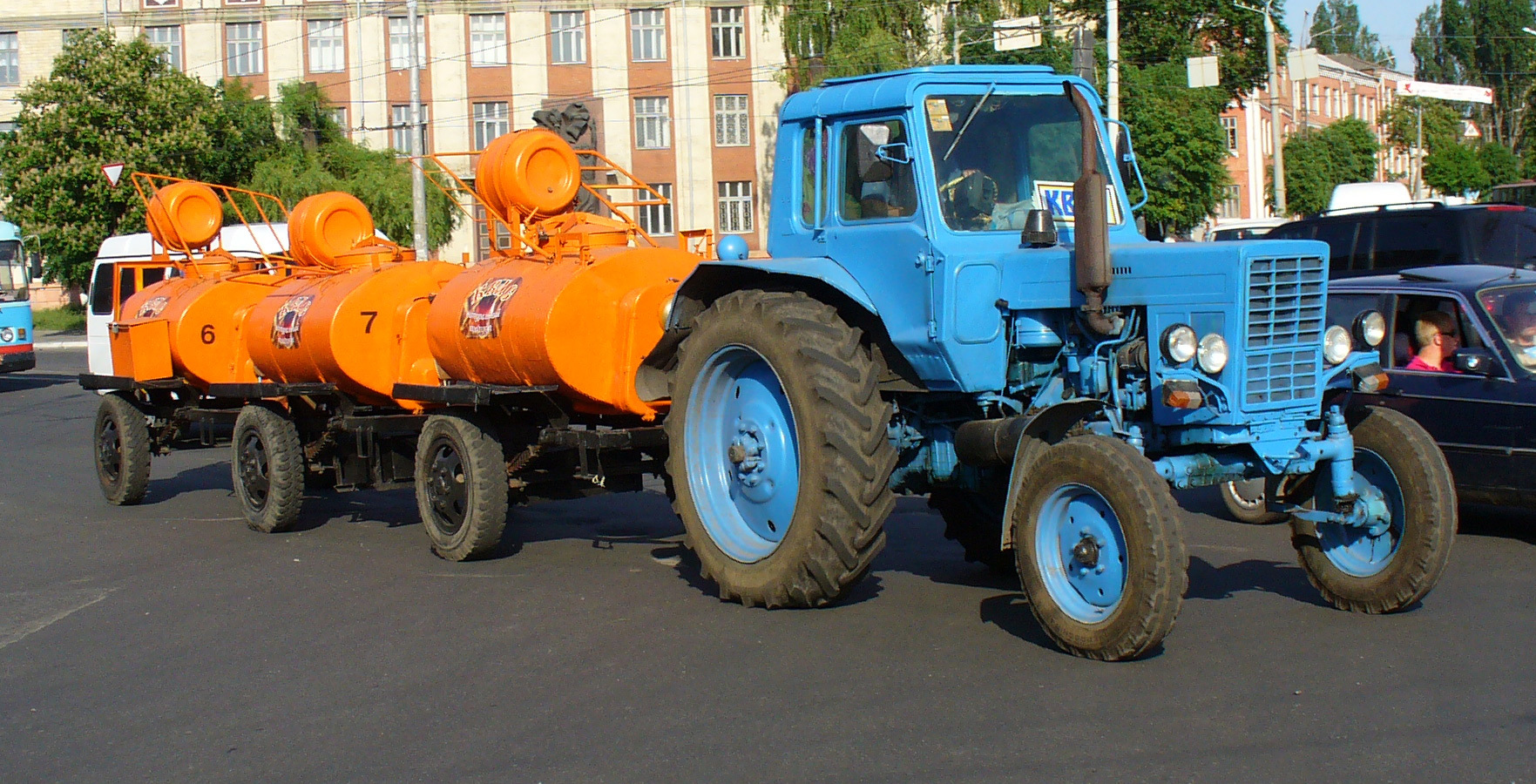
Tractor hauls barrels containing kvass in Vinnytsia, Ukraine

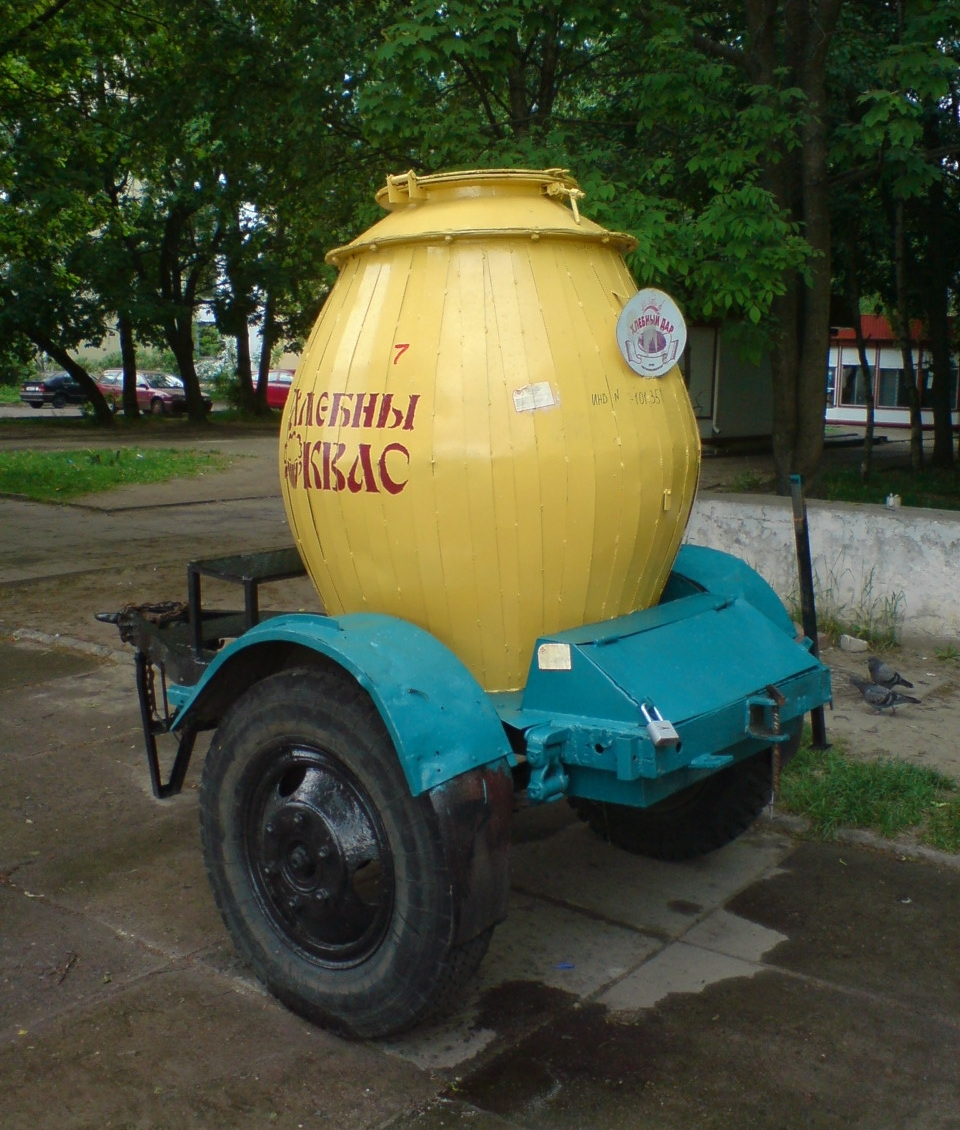
Kvass barrel in Mogilev, Belarus

Kvass barrels are specialized mobile vessels of large capacity designed for transportation of kvass and its retail sale. With the help of kvass barrels, proper preservation of kvass and its prompt delivery to consumers is ensured.

== Appearance ==
The main model of the kvass barrel is the ACPT-0.9 tanker trailer for transportation of kvass, the design of which was developed in the USSR, where it was produced since 1967 by the Novo-Troitsky Machine Building Plant, Karlovy Vary Mechanical Plant and Sokuluk Plant of Commercial Machine Building. Interestingly, the ACPT-0.9 tanker trailer for milk transportation has been manufactured since 1957. In the version of the early 1970s, in the front of the barrel (on the seller's side) in its upper part there was a water tank with a capacity of 30 liters. In addition, some characteristics of ACPT-0.9 tanks depended on the manufacturer, but generally changed slightly. The characteristics of tanks of this model, manufactured in modern Russian plants, also differ slightly from the Soviet ones (see below).

Kvass barrels are sealed containers made of food grade stainless steel or food grade aluminum (in the 1975 model year) and having at the bottom eyelets designed to attach it to a vehicle for transportation. The cart for transporting the fermented barrel has two wheels, a frame made of steel channels, and a coupling device with a towbar for coupling the cart with the vehicle. The barrel vessel itself is sealed and has a filler neck or drain tap for bottling and selling. Also in the lower part of the barrel there is a drain plug or ball valve designed to drain the remains of sourdough at the end of the work shift. To maintain the temperature conditions, kvass barrels are often covered with a special heat-insulating foam. For the convenience of selling kvass, in the filling part of the kvass barrel there is a device for bottling and quick washing of glasses and mugs and a device for supplying tap water to the washing device.

== Characteristics of the ACPT-0.9 ==
=== Soviet (1982, Sokuluk Plant "Torgmash") ===
Made of aluminum with thermal insulation, lined with steel

- Trailer chassis: TAPZ-755A
- Capacity, l: 900
- Inner diameter of filling-emptying pipe, mm: 45
- Neck diameter, mm: 498
- Overall dimensions, mm:
  - length: 3,370
  - width: 1,800
  - height: 2,200
- Gross weight, kg: 1,750
- Change of kvass temperature in Celsius in 10 hours at ambient temperature +-30 degrees Celsius: 2-4

=== Modern ===
- Trailer chassis: IAPZ-8019-01
- Capacity, l: 900
- Inner diameter of filling-emptying pipe, mm: 50
- Neck diameter, mm: 500
- Overall dimensions, mm:
  - length: 3,800
  - width: 2 150
  - height: 2,200
- Gross weight, kg: 2,560

During transportation, a serial connection of ACPT-0.9 is possible.

== See also ==
- Kvass
- Beer
- Barrel
