= Brottrunk =

Fermented grain beverage

Brottrunk (literally meaning "bread drink" in German) is a fermented grain beverage similar to bread kvass, made in Germany from bread. The bread is baked from biodynamically grown grains. This bread is then fermented in a proprietary month-long process. Then, without further processing, the liquid is bottled. First marketed in 1981 by master baker Wilhelm Kanne, this non-alcoholic probiotic beverage is distributed as Kanne Brottrunk in Germany and in several European countries.

Brottrunk contains live cultures (Lactobacillus reuteri), grain lactic acid, minerals and vitamins (though not in noteworthy amounts).

A number of limited clinical studies have been conducted in Germany that have also indicated the positive effect of brottrunk on the immune system, the skin, the digestive system and other health related issues.
