= Ochakovo =

Ochakovo may refer to:

- Ochakovo, a station on the Kalininsko-Solntsevskaya line of the Moscow Metro
- Ochakovo-Matveevskoe, an administrative district (raion) of Western Administrative Okrug, and one of the 125 raions of Moscow, Russia
- Ochakovo, a Russian beverage producer.
