= Zaława =

- Village
- Location within Poland
- Coordinates: 51°16′N 20°47′E
- Country: Poland
- Voivodeship: Masovian
- County: Szydłowiec
- Gmina: Chlewiska
- Population: 319

Zaława [zaˈwava] is a village in the administrative district of Gmina Chlewiska, within Szydłowiec County, Masovian Voivodeship, in east-central Poland.
