= Menachem Kipnis =

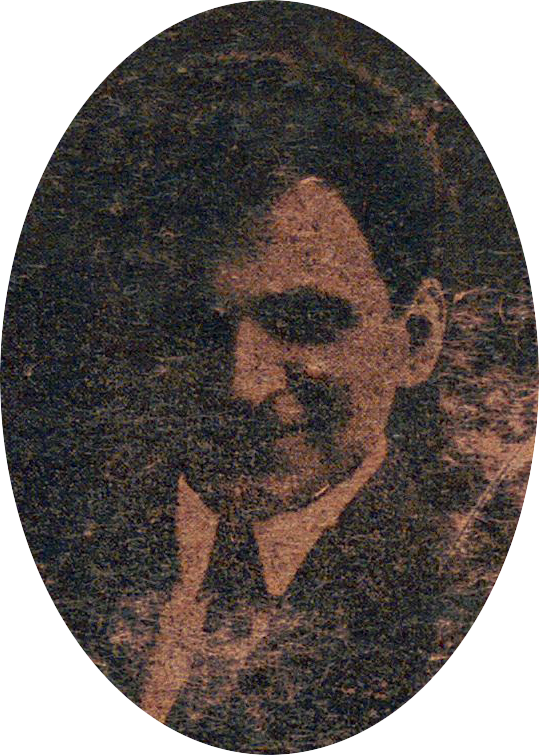
- Born: 1878; Ushomyr, Volhynia
- Died: 1942 (aged 63–64); Warsaw Ghetto
- Occupation: Writer, music critic, theatre critic

Menachem Kipnis (1878 – May 15, 1942) was a singer, critic, journalist, humorist, and photographer. He was also an ethnographer of Yiddish songs. As a tenor, Kipnis was a common performer of Yiddish songs.

He was born in Zhytomyr, Volhynian Governorate. Menachem Kipnis' father was an educated cantor. From the age of eight, Menachem Kipnis lived with his older brother, who was also a cantor and is the father of the writer Levin Kipnis. Menachem Kipnis received a traditional Jewish education and sang with his brother in the choir of the Chernobyl synagogue. In this he impressed with his beautiful alto voice.

Together with his wife Zimra Zeligfeld he toured with concerts of Yiddish folk songs in Poland, France, and Germany.

Kipnis was a major contributor to the lore of the Wise Men of Chelm. He published a column of Chelm stories in the Warsaw Yiddish daily Haynt, pretending to be a journalist reporting from Chelm. There was a (possibly apocryphal) story that the women of Chelm asked Kipnis to stop doing this because their daughters could not find bridegrooms: every time they hear from a shadkhn that the girl is from Chelm, they cannot stop laughing. He later published these tales in the book Khelemer mayses (Chelm Stories; Polish transcription: Chelemer Majses, 1930). In additional to the Chelm column, he published feuilletons and authoritative articles on Jewish music, as well as reviews of music and theater in Haynt and other Jewish press, sometimes under pen name "Pan Mecenas" (Mr. Attorney).

As a photographer, he captured the Jewish life in cities and shtetls of Poland.

He died from a stroke in Warsaw Ghetto in 1942. His wife was deported from the ghetto to Treblinka and perished there.

== Publications ==
- 1918: Zekhtsik folks-lider (Sixty Folk Songs)
- 1925: Akhtsik folks-lider (Eighty Folk Songs)
- 140 fołkslider, joined collection of 60 + 80 folksongs
- 1930: Khelemer majses (Chelm Stories), published by Sz. Cukier, Warsaw
- Jidisze klezmer in Pojln (Jewish Klezmer in Poland)
- Barimte jidisze muziker (Famous Jewish Musicians)
- Fun primitiwn folkslid biz der jidiszer simfoniszer muzik (From Primitive Folk Song to Jewish Symphonic Music)
- Za kulisami Warszawskiej Opery (1902-1918) (Behind the Scenes of the Warsaw Opera (1902-1918))
