= Ochakovo (company) =

Major Russian brewery and beverage company

- Company type: Joint-stock company
- Industry: Beverages
- Founded: 1978
- Headquarters: Moscow, Russian Federation
- Key people: Alexei Kochetov (president, majority stakeholder)
- Products: Beer, kvas, juice, cocktails, soda, mineral water, wine, medovukha, energy drinks, vodka
- Website: www.ochakovo.ru

Ochakovo is a Russian beverage company producing both alcoholic and non-alcoholic drinks. Focused mainly on the production of beer and kvas, Ochakovo ranks among the leaders in the latter category within the Russian Federation, being the second largest brand by market share in 2018. In addition to its own brands, Ochakovo produces drinks wholesale for Russian retailers such as X5 Retail Group.

== History ==
Ochakovo was originally founded in 1978 as the Russian: Московский пиво-безалкогольный комбинат, romanized: Moskovskiy pivo-belalkogolnyi kombinat, lit. 'Moscow beer and non-alcoholic [beverages] plant', a state-owned company, with a view to producing beverages for participants and spectators in the upcoming 1980 Moscow Olympics. In 1993 the plant was privatised, becoming a joint-stock company. While the firm maintains a respectable position within Russia, and has managed to open up foreign markets since the dissolution of the USSR, Ochakovo has slowly been losing market share in both the alcoholic and non-alcoholic beverage segments under pressure from multinational competitors such as Carlsberg, Coca-Cola and PepsiCo as well as from newer Russian firms such as Deka, going from holding a 39% of the market share for kvas production in 2009 to 18% in 2018.

In the aftermath of the 2022 Russian invasion of Ukraine, the company announced it was introducing a new line of soft drinks, allegedly intended as a substitute, or at least as competition, for Western brands that are expected to either withdraw from the Russian market or progressively reduce their production. In May 2022 Ochakovo launched Cool Cola (cola-flavoured), Fancy (orange-flavoured) and Street (lemon and lime-flavoured) as substitutes for Coca-Cola and Pepsi, Fanta and Mirinda, and Sprite and 7 Up, respectively. In June of the same year the company announced plans to launch apple cider production in the territory of Krasnodar Krai under the brand name Will's, with a view to replacing the main cider producers in the country, Heineken and Carlsberg, who announced their withdrawal from the Russian market.

== Museum of Traditional Beverages ==
The company also operates the Museum of Traditional Russian Beverages. Opened in 2005, the museum claims to be the only one of its kind in Russia, exhibiting kvas- and beer-making tools and equipment, different brewing procedures and offering a degustation of the company's products.

== Brands ==
Excluding production for retail chains, Ochakovo sells their products under the following brands, according to the company's website (in Russian):

Beer:

- Zhigulyovskoe
- 456
- L.E.P.
- Sekret Pivovara
- Yachmenny Kolos
- Khalzan (alcoholic and non-alcoholic)
- Steppenwolf
- Altstein
- Zlatovice
- Ledokol (strong beers)
- Ochakovo
- Pugach

Bottled water:

- Gorny khrustal'

Carbonated drinks:

- Reddot (Cola with no refined sugars)

Cocktails:

- BlackMix
- Mokhito
- Ochakovo
- RedRay

Energy drinks:

- Fitoenerdzhi (kvas with guarana)
- Powran

Hard seltzers:

- Street

Juice:

- Sochnaya komanda
- Goodini
- Akh! (traditional Russian flavours such as tarkhun)
- Mokhito
- Street
- CoolCola
- Fancy

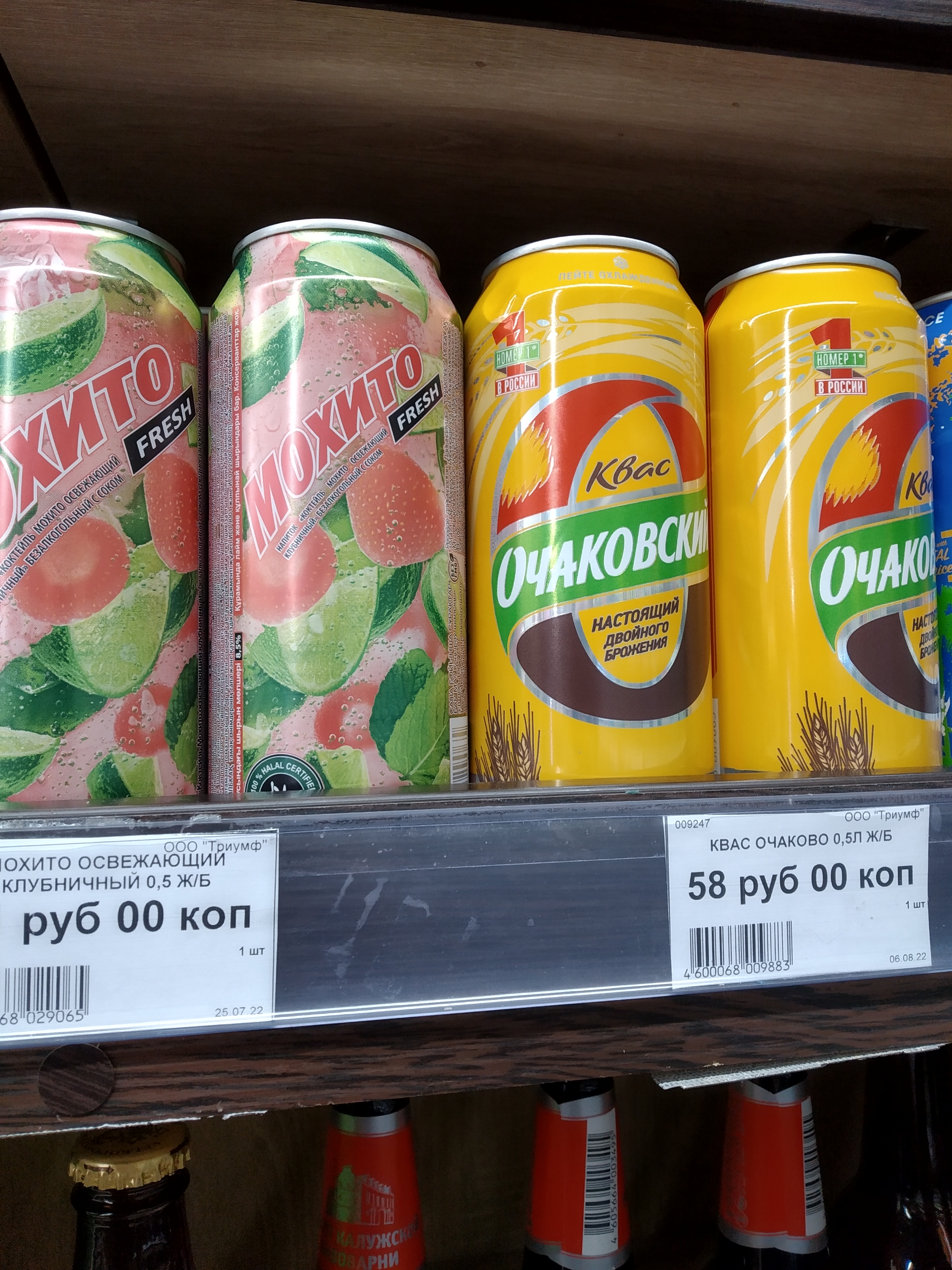
Cans of Ochakovsky kvas and Mokhito alcohol free cocktails at a store in Moscow region.

Kvas:

- Kvasyonok (alcohol-free kvas for children)
- Ochakovsky
- Semeyny sekret

Medovukha:

- Medovukha polusladkaya
- Medovukha traditsionnaya

Vodka:

- Ochakovskaya
- Zapal

Wines:

- Avtokhtonnoe
- Butterfly
- Kuban
- Tamani
- Yubileynoe
