= Haberbusch i Schiele =

Defunct Polish-based brewery

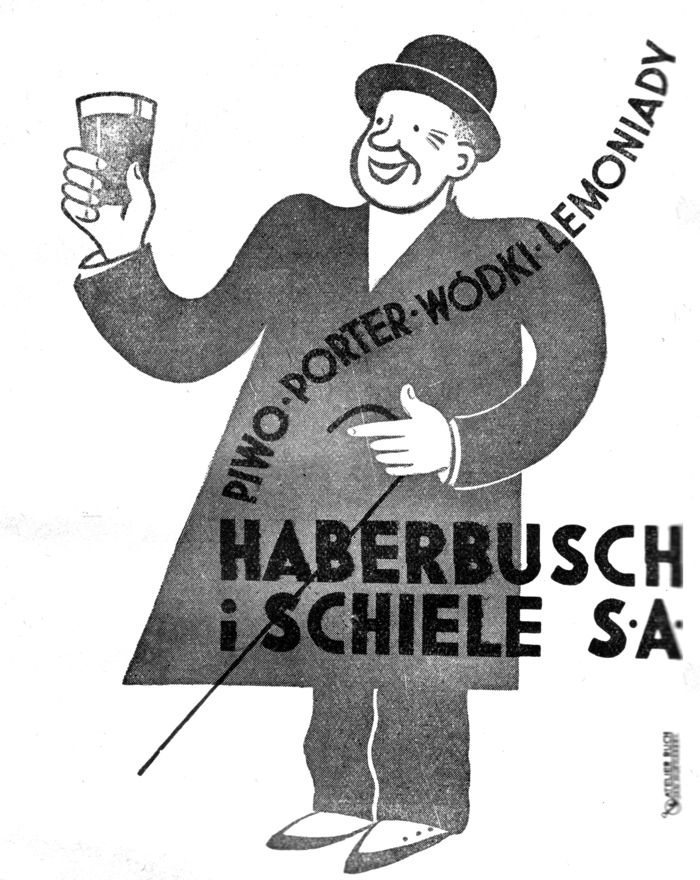
Advertisement of Haberbusch & Schiele (1936)

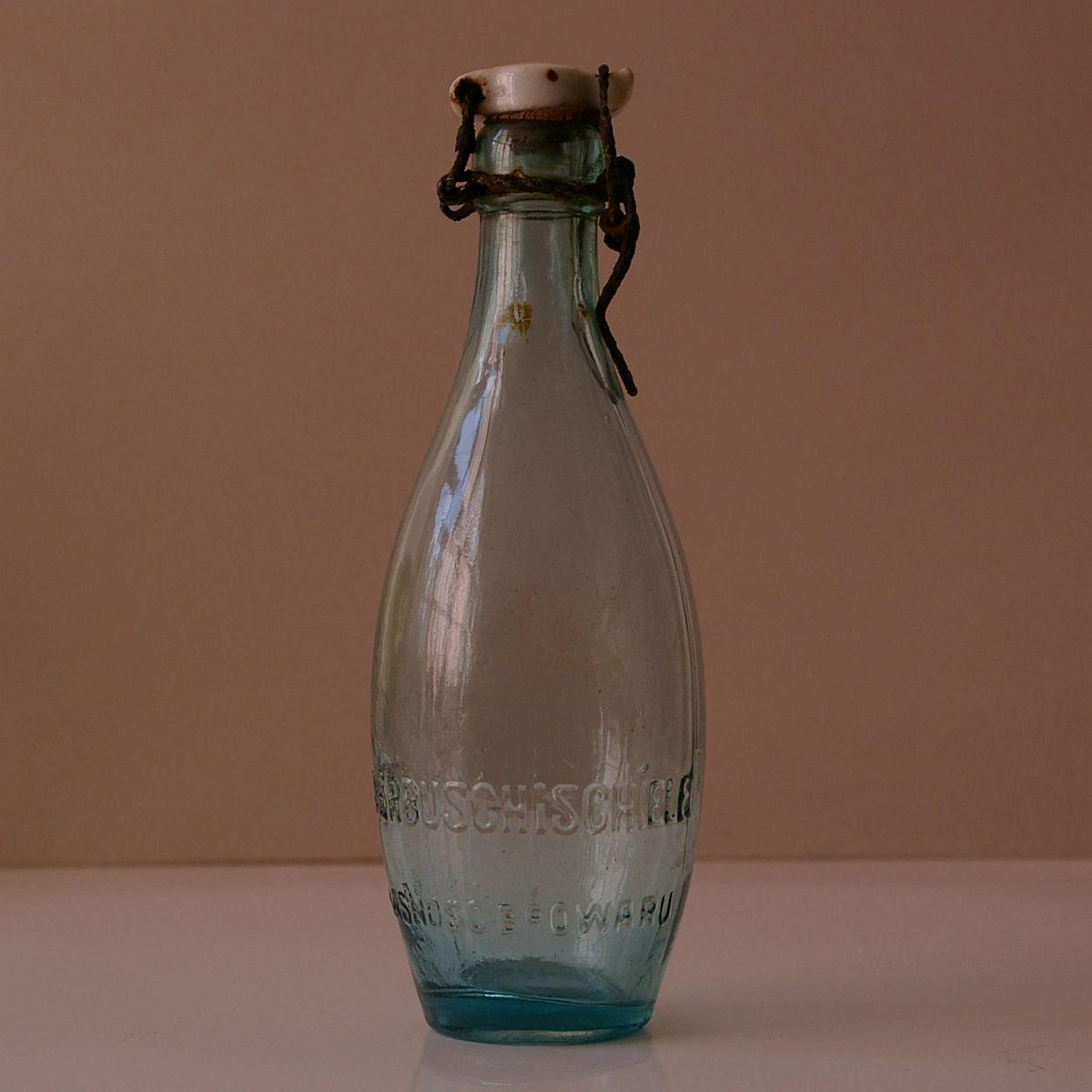
Deposit beer bottle of the former brewery

Haberbusch i Schiele was a (now defunct) Warsaw-based brewery holding created in 1846. By the end of 19th century, the company had grown to become the largest beer producer in Warsaw and one of the largest in Poland. Destroyed in the Warsaw Uprising during World War II, the brewery was then nationalized by the communist authorities of Poland and partially rebuilt for the Browary Warszawskie company.

== History ==
By mid-19th century beer-making in the Kingdom of Poland was neglected due to high excise taxes imposed by the Russian authorities. However, new technologies were being introduced and the industry was seen as a possible source of profit. In 1846 two Warsaw beer makers, Błażej Haberbusch and Konstanty Schiele created a company with their common father-in-law Henryk Klawe. The new Haberbusch, Schiele i Klawe partnership soon bought a bankrupt Schöffer i Glimpf brewery in central Warsaw from the Polish Bank. With Klawe's money the Haberbusch and Schiele managed to put the business back on track and in 1850 they acquired yet another brewery from a Mr. Czarnecki. The two companies were merged.

In 1865 the elderly Klawe withdrew from the firm and since then the company was known by only two surnames. About that time the Haberbusch and Schiele duo started to promote their beer. Among their original ideas was acquisition or rental of several beer gardens in various parts of the city, where the beer was served and music bands invited. They also extended their product line following the construction of a dry ice factory. Also, in 1880s the firm opened up a beer bottling factory in Kiev and started to export the beer to Ukraine. In 1898 the firm was transformed into a joint stock company under the name of Joint Stock Society of the Steam Brewery and Dry Ice Factory "Haberbusch i Schiele".

Following the World War I and regaining of Polish independence, a new era began for the company. The period of post-war prosperity resulted in the Haberbusch i Schiele company becoming the largest Warsaw-based brewery out of several dozen firms. In 1921 the company merged with other top-five breweries (run by Edward Reych, Karol Machlejd, Seweryn Jung and the Korona brewery). The result of the merger was the creation of the United Breweries Joint-Stock Company "Haberbusch i Schiele", the largest brewery in Warsaw and one of the most influential in Poland. The position of the new company rose quickly and by 1924 it extended the range of production to coffee, vodka, liqueurs, lemonade and sauces.

During the World War II, following the occupation of Poland by the Nazis and the Soviets, the brewery continued its activities under a German management board. The production continued until the outbreak of the Warsaw Uprising. During the fights the granaries and depots of the company served as the granary of Warsaw, providing barley and sugar to the starving population of the besieged city. The brewery complex at Ceglana street was held by the Home Army until the very end of the uprising. In the result of the heavy fights and the German actions after the uprising had ended, approximately 70% of the brewery's infrastructure had been destroyed.

After the war the brewery was nationalized and partially rebuilt. In modern times the descendants of the Haberbusch and Schiele families are trying to reclaim their property from the modern Warka Brewery company, part of the Grupa Żywiec concern.

== Notes and references ==
In-line:

General:
- "Zjednoczone Browary "Haberbusch i Schiele"" [United Breweries "Haberbusch and Schiele"]. Jednota (in Polish).
