= Shevchenkivskyi District, Lviv =

Coordinates: 49.8700°N 23.9842°E

Shevchenkivskyi District Шевченківський район
- Urban district in Lviv
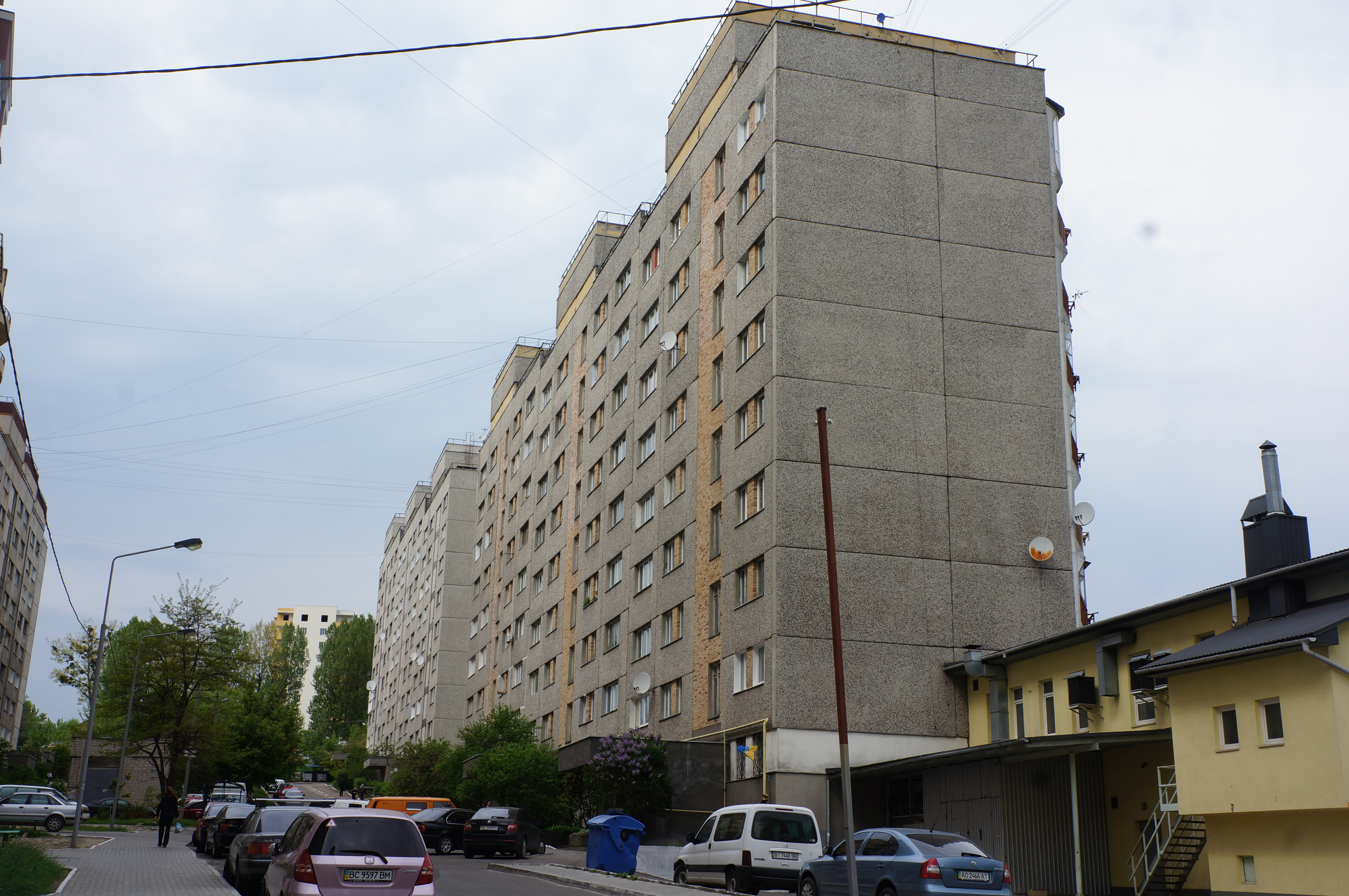
- A Soviet-era apartment block in northern Lviv

- Map of Lviv and its districts with Shevchenkivskyi highlighted in red
- Country: Ukraine
- Oblast: Lviv Oblast

Population
  - Total: 170,000
- Time zone: EET

Shevchenkivskyi District (Ukrainian: Шевченківський район) is an urban district of the city of Lviv. This district covers the northern part of the city. It contains such neighborhoods as Pidzamche, Holosko, Klepariv, Zamarstyniv, Zboyishcha, India, Kamyanka and Riasne. In the northwest it borders with the town of Briukhovychi and Briukhovychi forest.

== Name ==
The current name of the district comes from Ukrainian poet and artist Taras Shevchenko. Historically the area to the north of Lviv's Old Town was known as "Kraków suburb" or "Zhovkva neighbourhood".

== Historical areas ==
=== Holosko ===
The neighbourhood of Holosko is located on the territory of former suburbs Holosko Velyke and Holosko Male. Large-scale construction has been ongoing in the area in recent years.

=== Klepariv ===
Known since the 13th century, the suburb of Klepariv became part of Lviv in 1931. The name of the neighbourhood derives from Lviv burgher Andreas Klöpper, who owned it in the 14th century. Starting from the 15th century vineyards were located in the area. One of the region's oldest Jewish cemeteries, first mentioned in 1414 and closed in 1855, was located in Klepariv. Lviv's first industrial brewery was established in Klepariv in 1715 and still functions under the name of Lviv Brewery. A nearby hill served as the execution site of haidamaks in 1769 and Polish rebels in 1847; a monument to commemorate the latter was installed on the location in 1895. In 1855-1863 the House of Military Invalids, now hosting the Lviv State Institute of Life Safety, was constructed in Klepariv according to a project of Theophil Hansen. Lviv's second biggest necropolis, the Yaniv Cemetery, opened on the outskirts of Klepariv in 1888 and became a burial place of several notable personalities, including Myron Tarnavsky, Kost Levytsky, Olha Basarab and Bohdan-Ihor Antonych. A Jewish hospital was established in the area in 1898-1901. Lviv's first stationary Ukrainian theatre was established in a reading house of Klepariv's Prosvita society, built in 1911 by architect Ivan Levynskyi. In November 1918 Klepariv was fought over by Ukrainian and Polish troops. One of Lviv's first bus lines started serving the district in the 1930s. Klepariv is known for its special sort of cherries known as Griotte de Kleparow.

=== Pidzamche ===
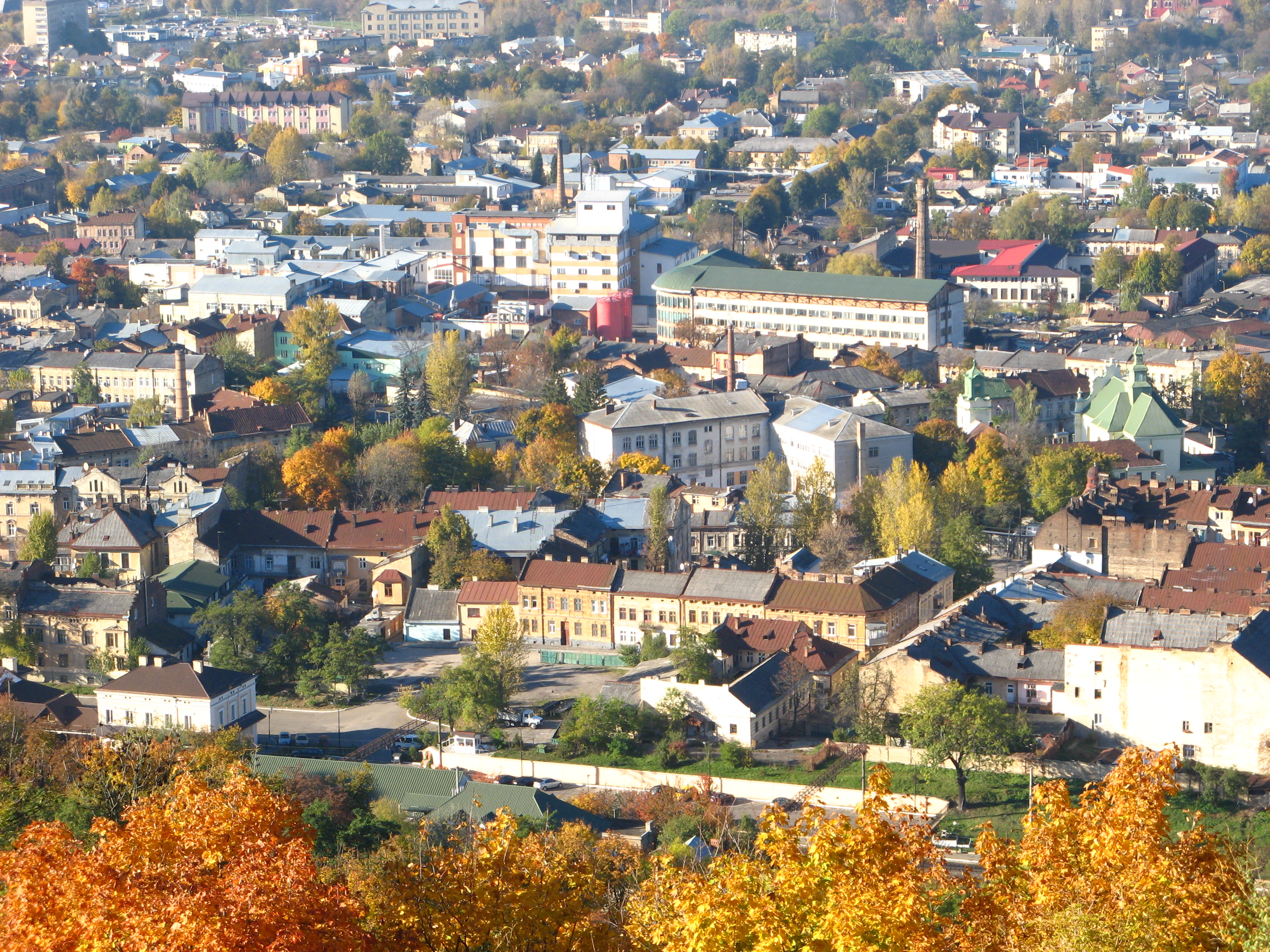
A view of Pidzamche from the High Castle

Pidzamche is recognized to be the oldest part of Lviv. Starting from princely times it was settled by craftsmen and traders. Located outside of the city walls, Pidzamche was accessible for settlement of newcomers from different countries and hosted free workers who didn't belong to any guild. The waters of Poltva river flowing nearby led to the establishment of numerous tanneries, slaughterhouses and mills. The emergence of railways during the era of Austro-Hungarian rule quickly turned the district into an industrial area. Pidzamche railway station served as a logistical hub for local enterprises, supplying among others the famous Baczewski alcohol factory. Among notable companies still active in Pidzamche are Svitoch confectionery factory and Galca Ltd. specializing in coffee production.

During the early 20th century parks of Pidzamche served as a training ground of the Ukrainian Sokil sports society. Later a Jewish ghetto existed in the neighbourhood. In modern times, the district attained an image of a remote and depressive area. Following the closure of many industrial enterprises, reconstruction and revitalization works are ongoing in Pidzamche, including, among others the creation of murals and establishment of a modern art centre.

=== Riasne ===
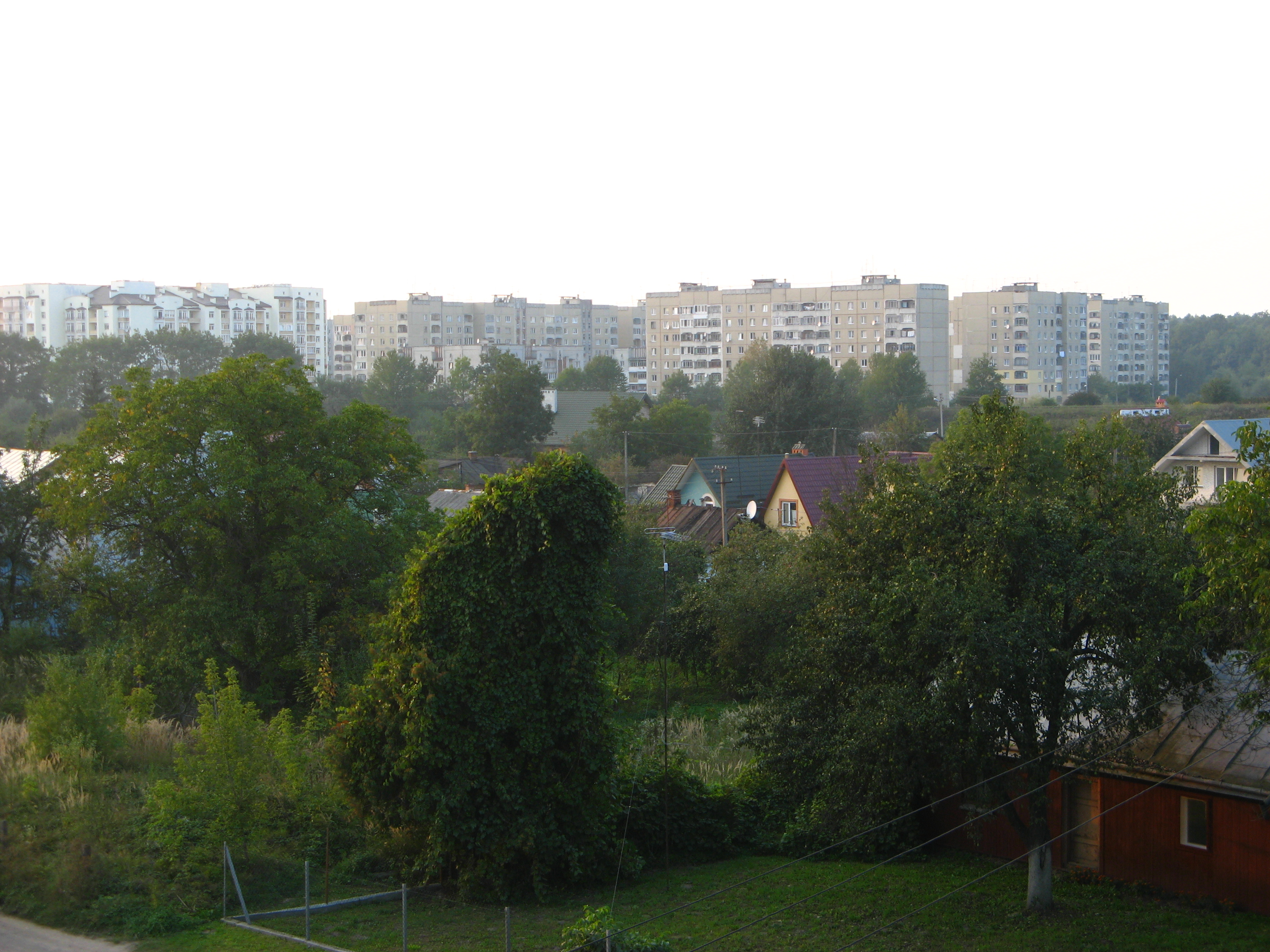
A view of Riasne

The area of Riasne (Polish: Rzęsna) was first mentioned in the 15th century. The village of Rzęsna Polska was founded in 1433 by the Roman Catholic bishop of Lviv. A Catholic church of Saints Peter and Paul existed in the settlement from that time. First built of wood and destroyed during Turkish-Tatar raids, in 1895 it was reconstructed in stone. In 1614 the local parish incorporated nearby settlements of Briukhovychi, Rokytne and Riasna-Ruska. From 1946 and until the declaration of Ukrainian independence, the church was subject to the Moscow Partiarchate. Currently it belongs to the Ukrainian Greek Catholic Church.

In Austrian times a military fort was constructed in the area. Riasne was also known as a seat of one of the branches of Prosvita society. Heavy fighting took place in Riasne during the First and Second World Wars, as well as during the Polish-Ukrainian War of 1919. In 1932 a monument to Poles fallen during the wars was opened in the village. Until the 1940s mass settlement of Polish population took place Riasne, facilitated by the railway line connecting Lviv with Rava-Ruska. Following the Second World War the Poles were displaced, and many Ukrainians from Zakerzonia, including Lemkos deported from Poland, settled in the area.

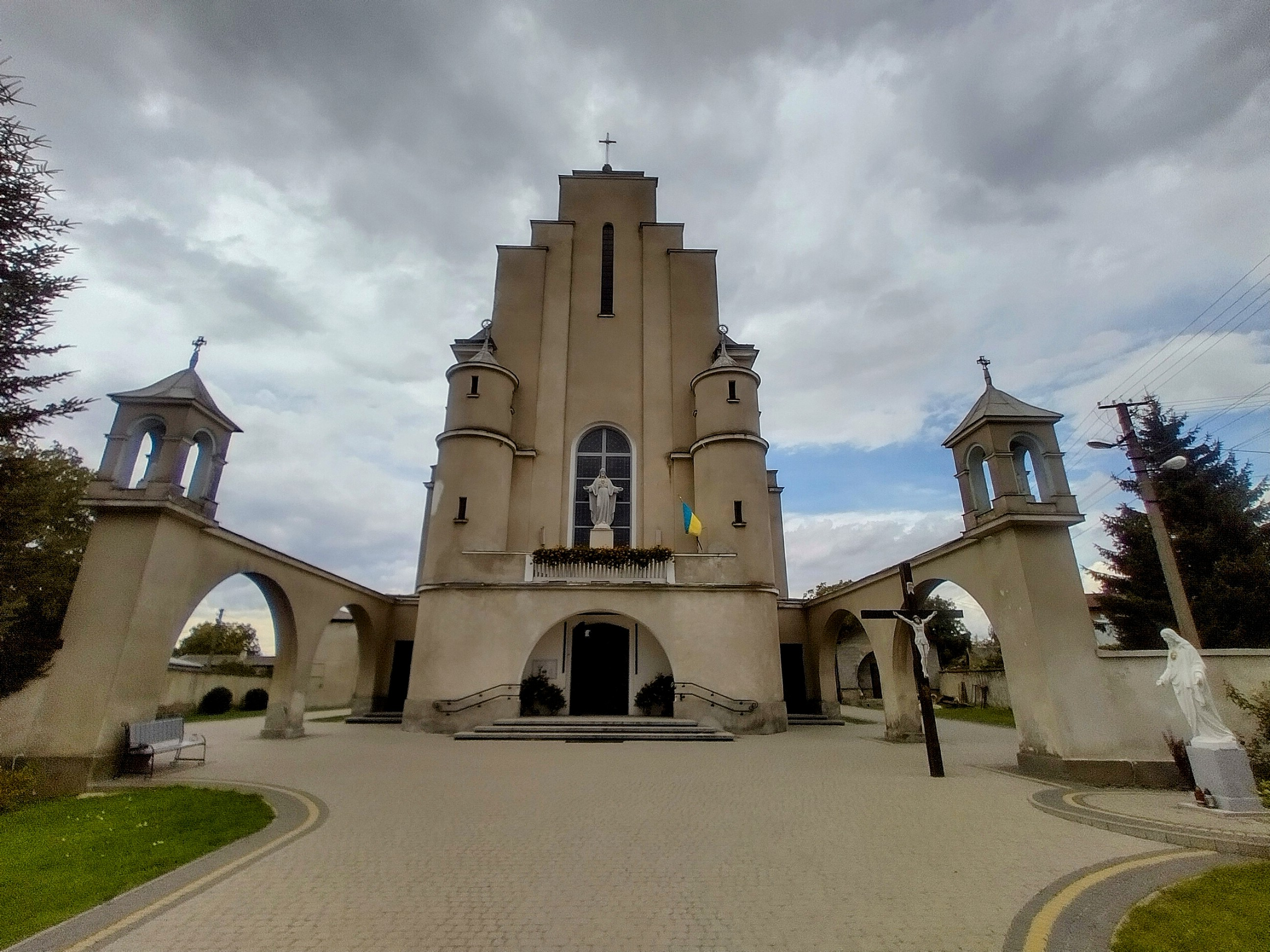
Church of the Most Holy Heart of Jesus

The eastern part of Riasne, known as Batorivka, was incorporated into Lviv in the 1930s. In 1939 a Roman Catholic Church of the Most Holy Heart of Jesus was opened, which now belongs to the Ukrainian Greek Catholic Church. In 1958 another part of the area known as Kamianka became part of Lviv. Finally, in 1988 the village of Riasne was officially incorporated into the city, but nearby Riasne-Ruske still remains a separate settlement. From the 1970s and into the 1990s the district witnessed massive residential construction. A number of churches belonging to the Orthodox Church of Ukraine and Ukrainian Greek Catholic Church have been built in Riasne since the 1990s.

Greek Catholic priest Oleksiy Zaryckyy was active in Riasne during the postwar years and became a martyr. A prominent wondermaking icon of Virgin Mary revered by Greek Catholics stems from Riasne.

Until the 1990s peat was produced from marshy areas in the vicinity of Riasne. In modern days the district is known for its industrial enterprises working in the spheres of machine building and processing of wood. Riasne is served by two railway stations and a railway stop.

=== Zamarstyniv ===
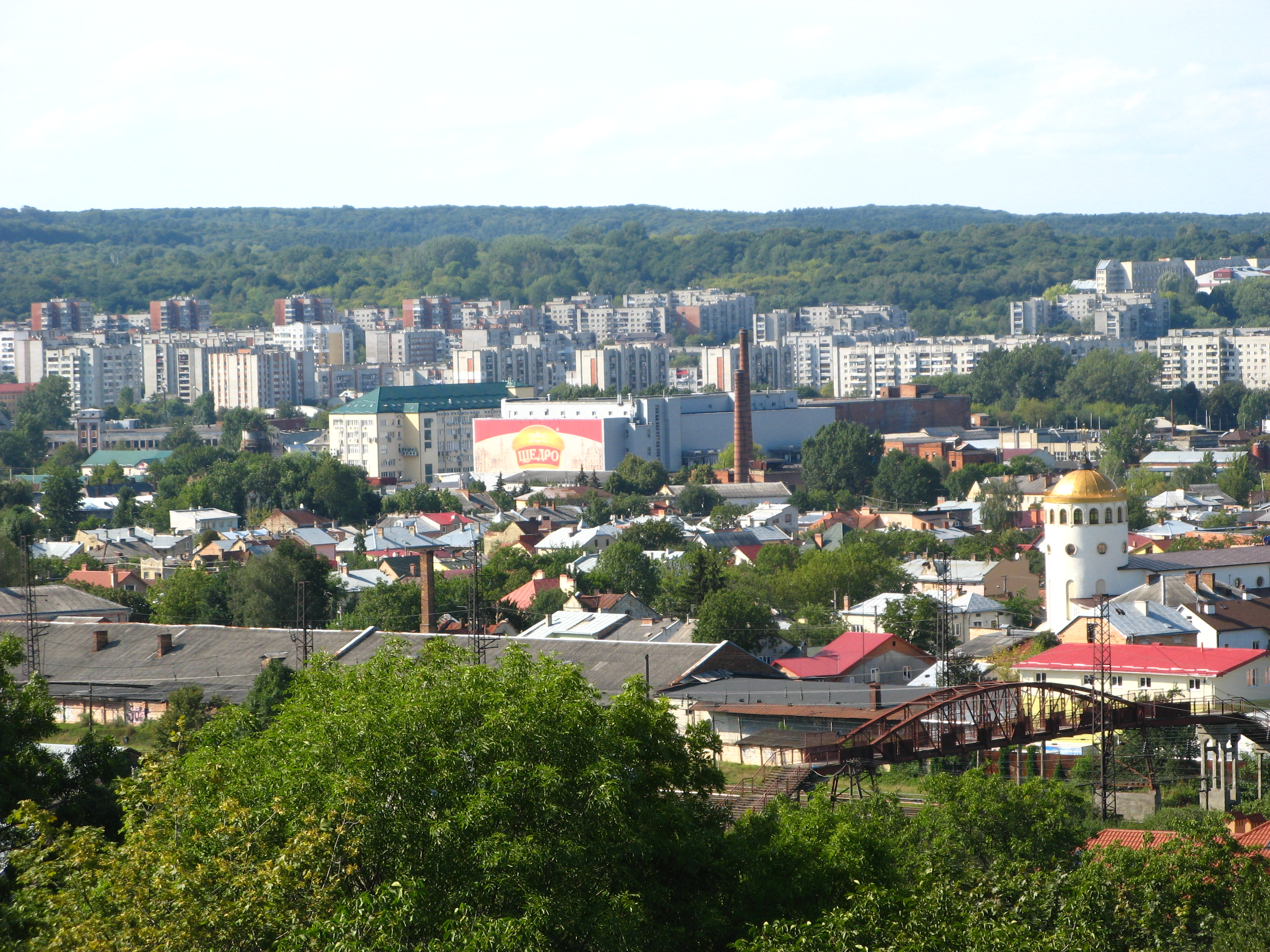
Skyline of Zamarstyniv

The neighbourhood of Zamarstyniv emerged in the area of Belz fields which were located along the right bank of Poltva. It was established in 1389 as a manor of Lviv burgher Jan Sommerstein and was known as Sommersteinhof (German for "Sommerstein's Court"), with the name eventually being adopted by locals in its modern form. The settlement was recognized as a property of Lviv, and its inhabitants had to participate in repair of city fortifications.

By the late 1920s Zamastyniv's population had reached 15,000, and it became Lviv's biggest suburb. In 1903 a yeast factory was opened in the neighbourhood; in the 1920s the enterprise was repurposed for production of liquors by the Baczewski company, and after the Second World War an instrumental factory was established on its site. A Capuchin monastery was established in Zamarstyniv in 1904 and functioned until its liquidation by Soviet authorities in 1946; currently a Greek Catholic church functions on its premises. In 1928-1934 an open-air swimming pool was constructed in the neighbourhood. In 1930 Zamarstyniv officially became part of Lviv. By 1940 35% of the whole city's population lived in the neighbourhood.

During the German occupation a Jewish Ghetto, Lwów Ghetto, was organized in Zamarstyniv, housing more than 130,000 people. Part of its inmates were killed on the spot, meanwhile others were transported to Belzec extermination camp. Between 1944 and 1955 a Soviet NKVD prison was active in the neighbourhood; approximately 1500 people who died or were tortured to death in the establishment were buried on a secret ground located nearby. Since 2016 a museum dedicated to the era of totalitarian rule has been functioning at the site.

During the 1970s the riverbed of Poltva in the area was covered up. Under Soviet rule a large hospital complex was established in Zamarstyniv. In 2011 a museum dedicated to Kvitka Cisyk was opened in one of the district's schools.

=== Zboyishcha ===
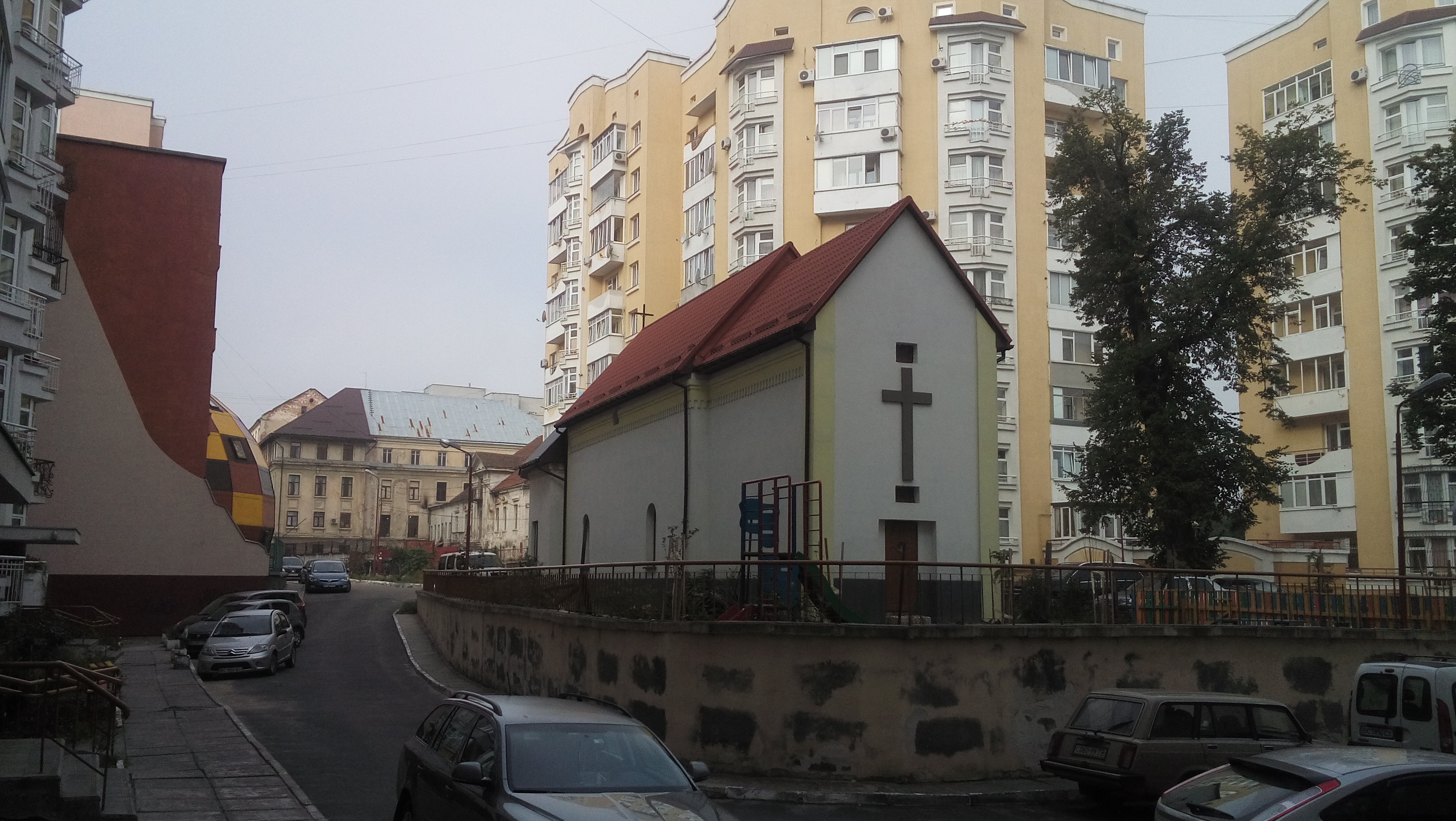
Redemptorist chapel in Zboyishcha

Originally known a suburban village, in 1919 Zboyishcha (then known as Zboyiska) became the seat of the Redemptorist order in Galicia, whose monks founded their monastery in the area. In 1921 a minor seminary and a novitiate were opened there, however, in 1945 the monastery was closed down by Soviet authorities.

Before World War II, the area of Zboyishcha, located near the road connecting Lviv to Zhovkva, was famous for its batiar subculture. Batiars from the locality followed their own "code of honour", which forbade them to do harm to inhabitants of their district, closely cooperated with criminals from nearby Zamarstyniv and were reported to have good relations with the local police and clergy. In our days Zboyishcha is home to a major market.

== See also ==
- Urban districts of Ukraine
