= Beer in Ukraine =

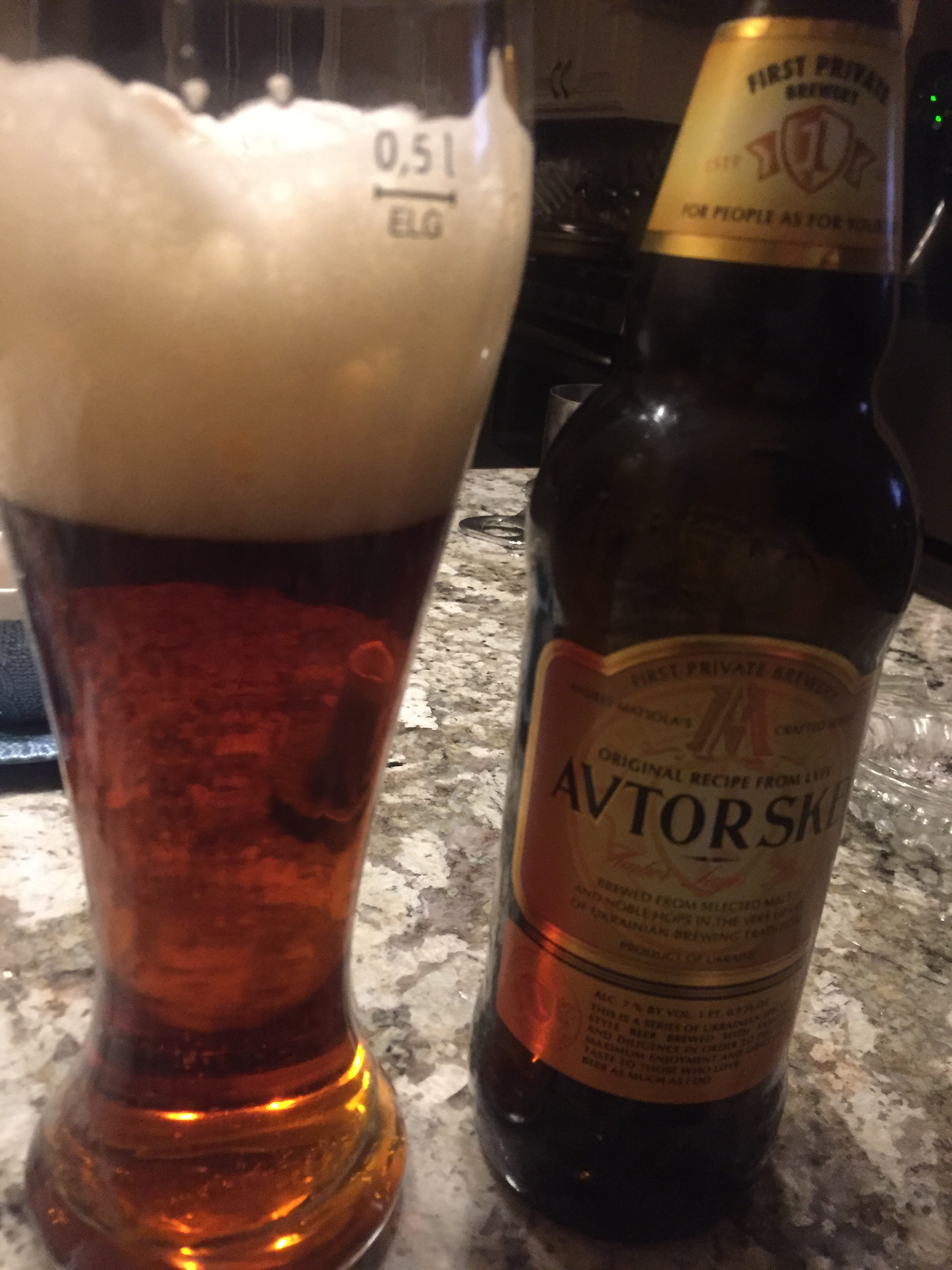
Avtorske beer

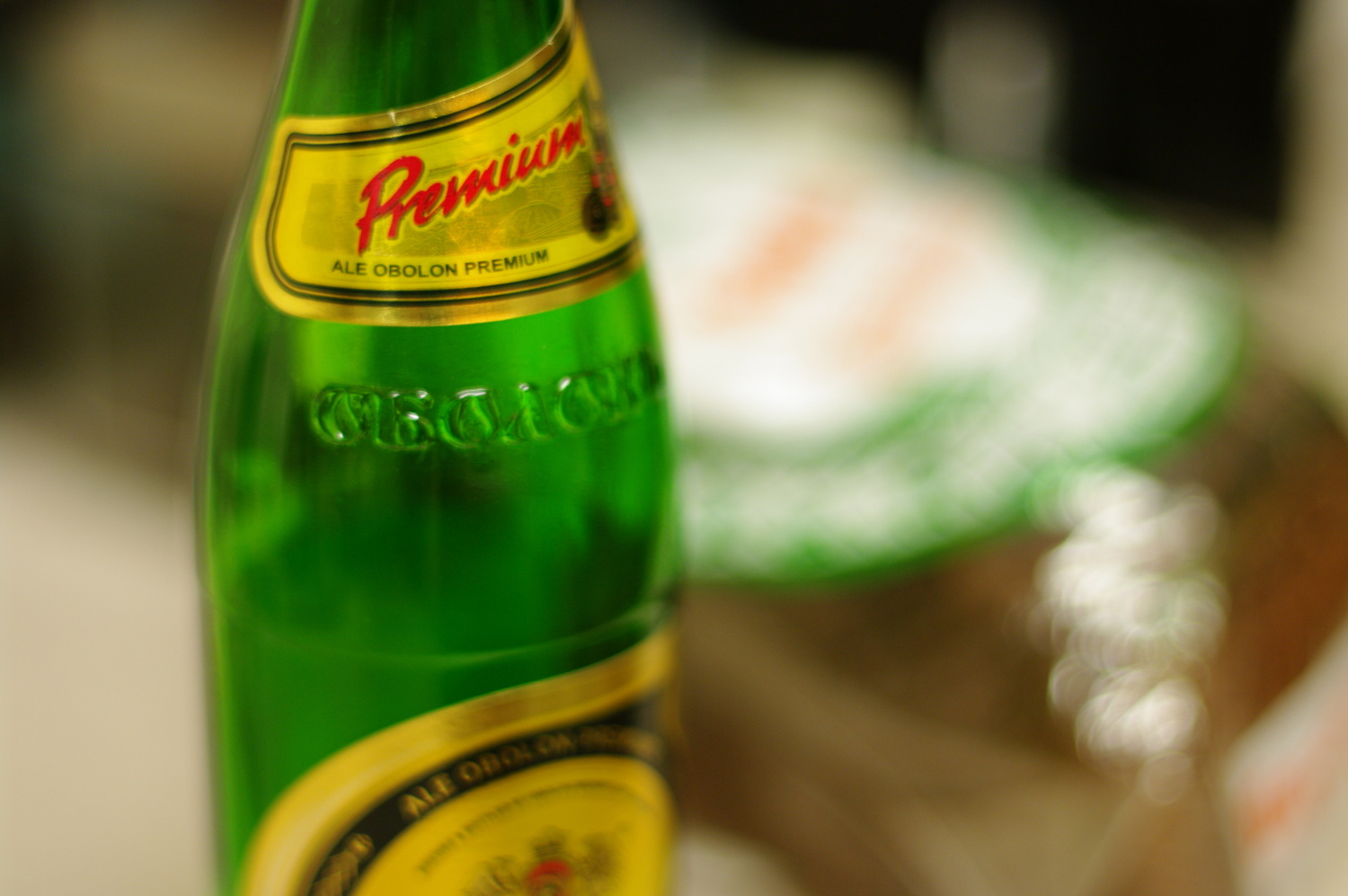
Obolon beer made in Kyiv

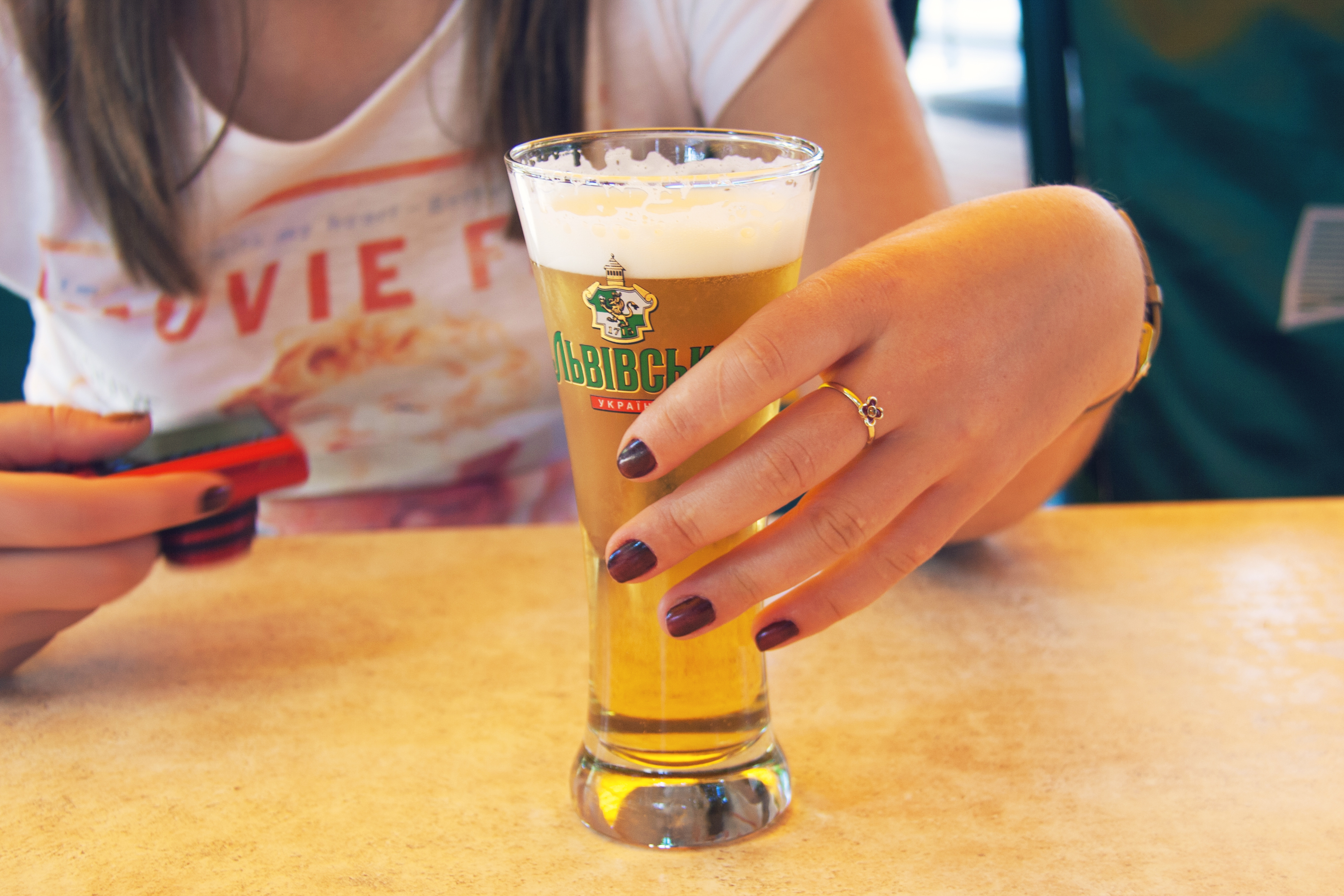
A glass of Lvivske

In 2011 Ukrainian beer production grew by 3.3% to 31 mln hl. Basing on the data of the trade balance (production + import - export) the Ukrainian beer market in 2010 grew by 5.5% to 28.3 mln. hl. In value market grew by 18% to 22.4 bln hrn. (or 12% to $2.6 bln).

This is a list of breweries, beer brands from Ukraine, and beer events in Ukraine.

== Major breweries and beer brands ==
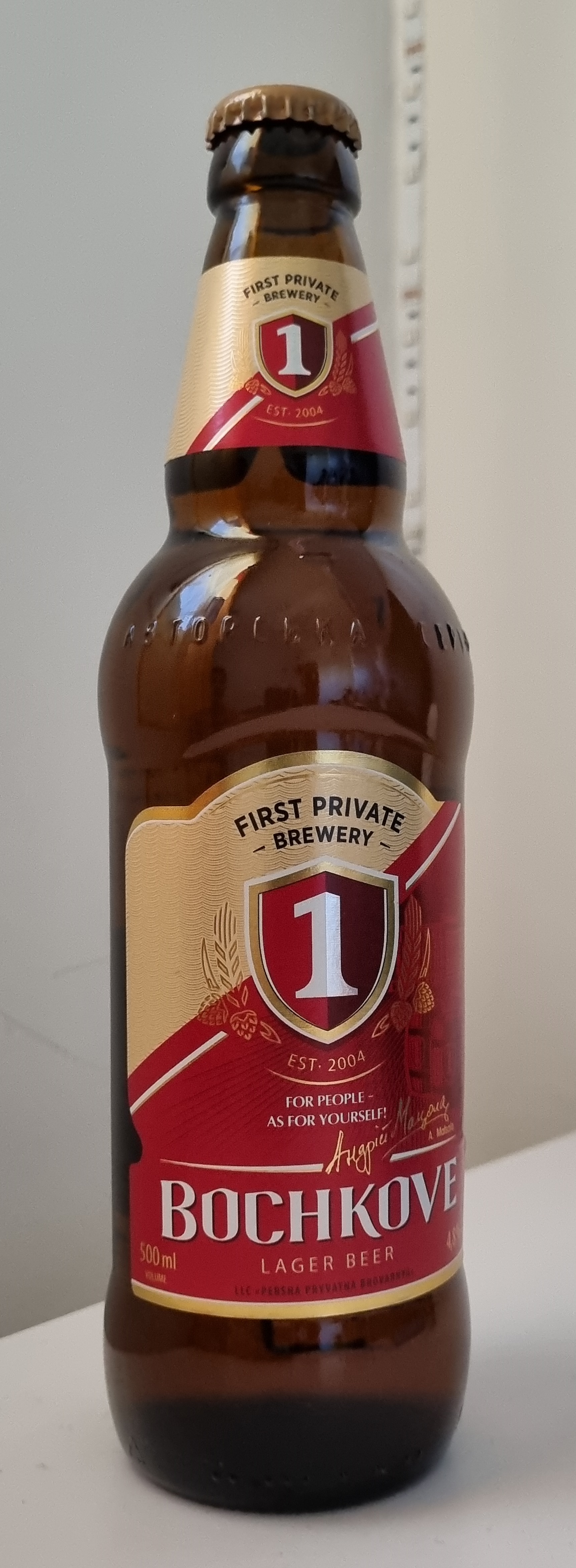
Berdychiv Khmilne

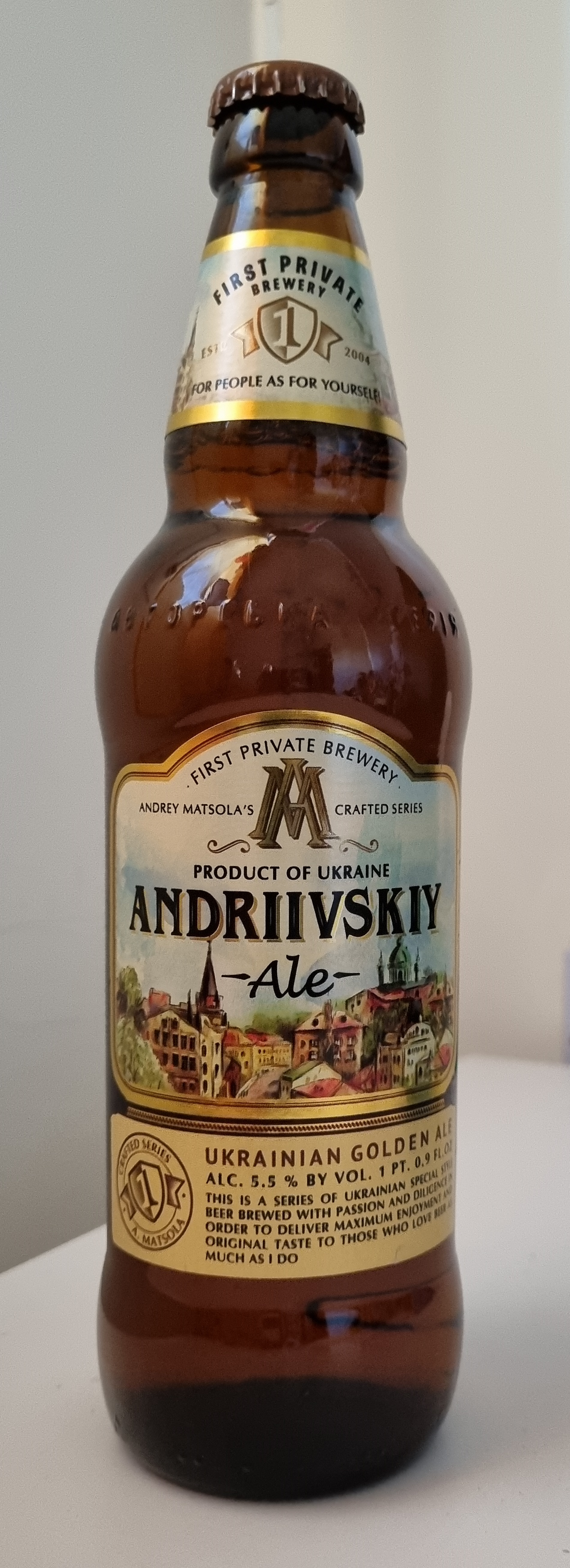
Berdychiv Khmilne

Some of the most renowned Ukrainian beers are Chernihivske, Obolon, and Lvivske.

Leading brewing companies:

- Anheuser-Busch InBev (local beer brands: Chernihivske, Rohan, Yantar, Chezz)
  - Desna Brewery, Chernihiv
  - Rohan Brewery, Kharkiv
  - Yantar Brewery, Mykolaiv
- Carlsberg Group Ukraine (local beer brands: Slavutych, Lvivske, Arsenal, Khmilne)
  - Kyiv Brewery
  - Lviv Brewery
  - Zaporizhia Brewery
- Obolon CJSC (beer brands: Obolon, Desant, Hike, Zibert, Magnat)
- SABMiller→Efes Ukraine (local beer brands: Sarmat from Donetsk)
- First Private Brewery (local beer brands: Stare Misto, Chorne, Avtorske, Andriivskiy)

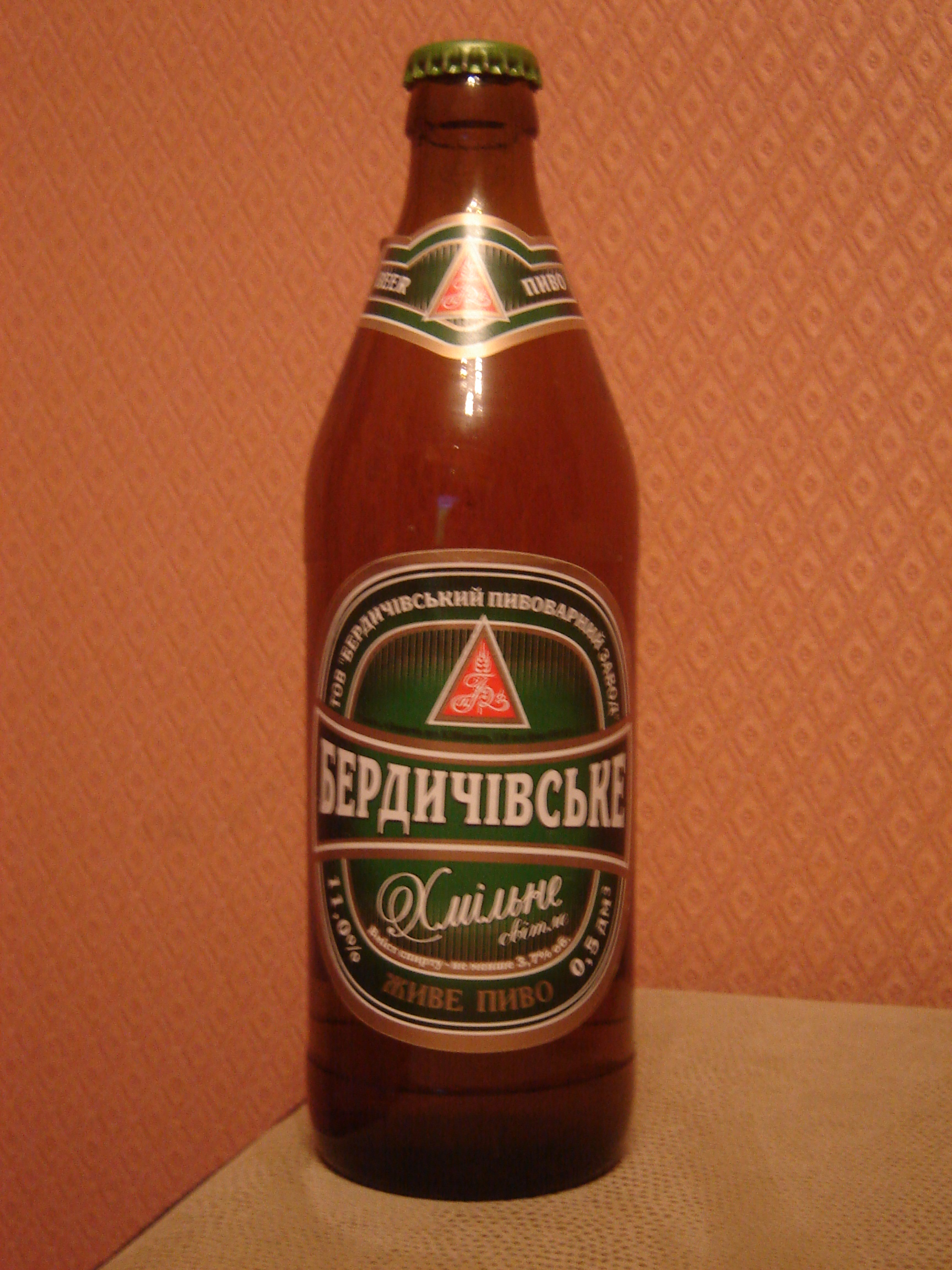
Berdychiv Khmilne

Local breweries:

- Berdychiv Brewery
- Kalusky Brewery
- Karpatska Brewery
- Kreminsky Brewery
- Krym Brewery
- Lyspy Brewery
- Luhansk Brewery
- Lutsk Brewery
- Melitopol Brewery
- Mikulinetsky Brovar
- Brovar Brewery
- Pavlivsky Brewery
- Mikulychyn Brewery
- Poltavpyvo
- Riven Brewery
- Rovenky Brewery
- Savativsky Brewery
- Slavutsky Brewery
- Opillya Brewery
- Umnpyvo
- Nova Bavaria
- Khmelpyvo
- Shale Brewery

== Beer during the 2022 Russian invasion of Ukraine ==
At the beginning of the 2022 Russian invasion of Ukraine, Ukrainian brewery Pravda Beer Theatre paused brewing beer and started making Molotov cocktails. The brewery also shared their recipes and artwork to craft breweries worldwide to start making their beer and asked them to make donations to the company's relief-fund efforts if they chose to use these recipes.

Many beer breweries worldwide are brewing beer where a part of the revenue is donated to Ukraine, as shown on the website brewforukraine.beer. Untappd also started a campaign to support Ukrainian beers.

Also after the invasion in 2022, brewmaster Jeremy Duncan went to the brewing room at the Anheuser-Busch brewery in Newark, which made Chernigivske, a Ukrainian beer, to raise money to donate to humanitarian aid in Ukraine. Kegs were filled for American distribution and cans for Canadian distribution at the brewing facility in Newark, New Jersey.

== See also ==
- Beer and breweries by region
- Ukrainian Beer Lovers Party
