= Chernihivske =

Ukrainian beer

Чернігівське
- Manufacturer: Chernigivske
- Alcohol by volume: Light (Світле): 4.8% ABV, lager; White (Біле): 5.0% ABV - First unfiltered lager beer on the Ukrainian market; White Night (Біла Нiч): 4.8% ABV, dark unfiltered lager; Titan: 8% ABV, strong amber lager; Titan Unfiltered: 8% ABV, strong unfiltered lager; 0.0 (Безалкогольне): 0% ABV, lager; White 0 ALco (Біле 0 ALco): 0% ABV, unfiltered lager
- Style: Various
- Website: chernigivske.ua

Chernihivske (Ukrainian: Чернігівське) is a brand of lager beer that was produced in Ukraine and is now produced in several other countries. It originates from the Ukrainian city of Chernihiv. The beer was brewed for the first time as a gift to celebrate the 1,300th anniversary of the city in 1988.

Chernihivske beer was produced in three breweries in Ukraine, located in Chernihiv, Kharkiv and Mykolaiv. During the Russian invasion of Ukraine, all these cities were heavily damaged by Russian artillery, missile, bomb and drone attacks and production was stopped at all these breweries.

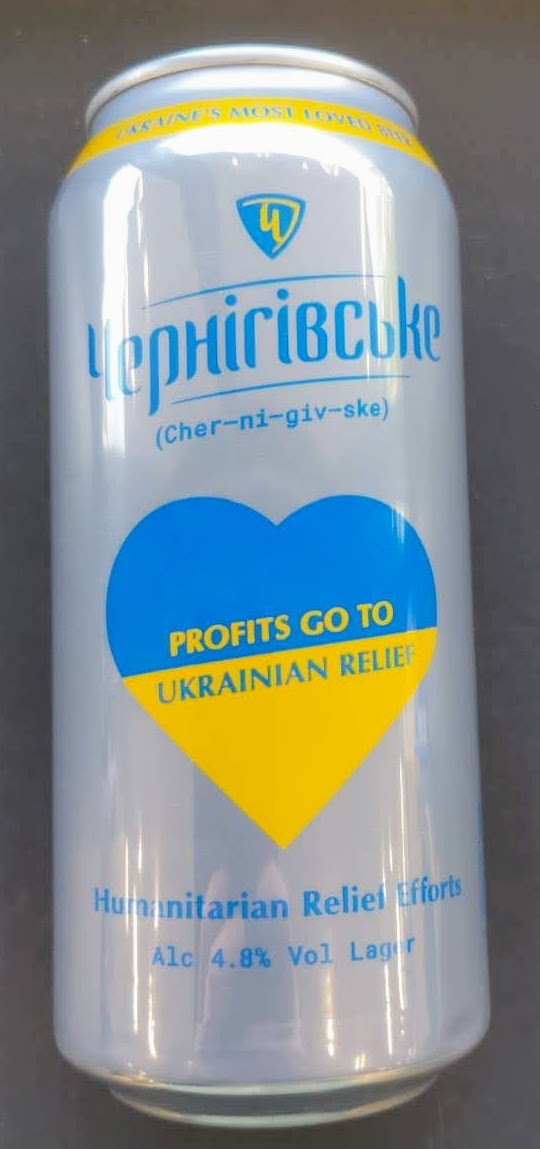
A can of British-made Chernigivske that is sold to support relief efforts

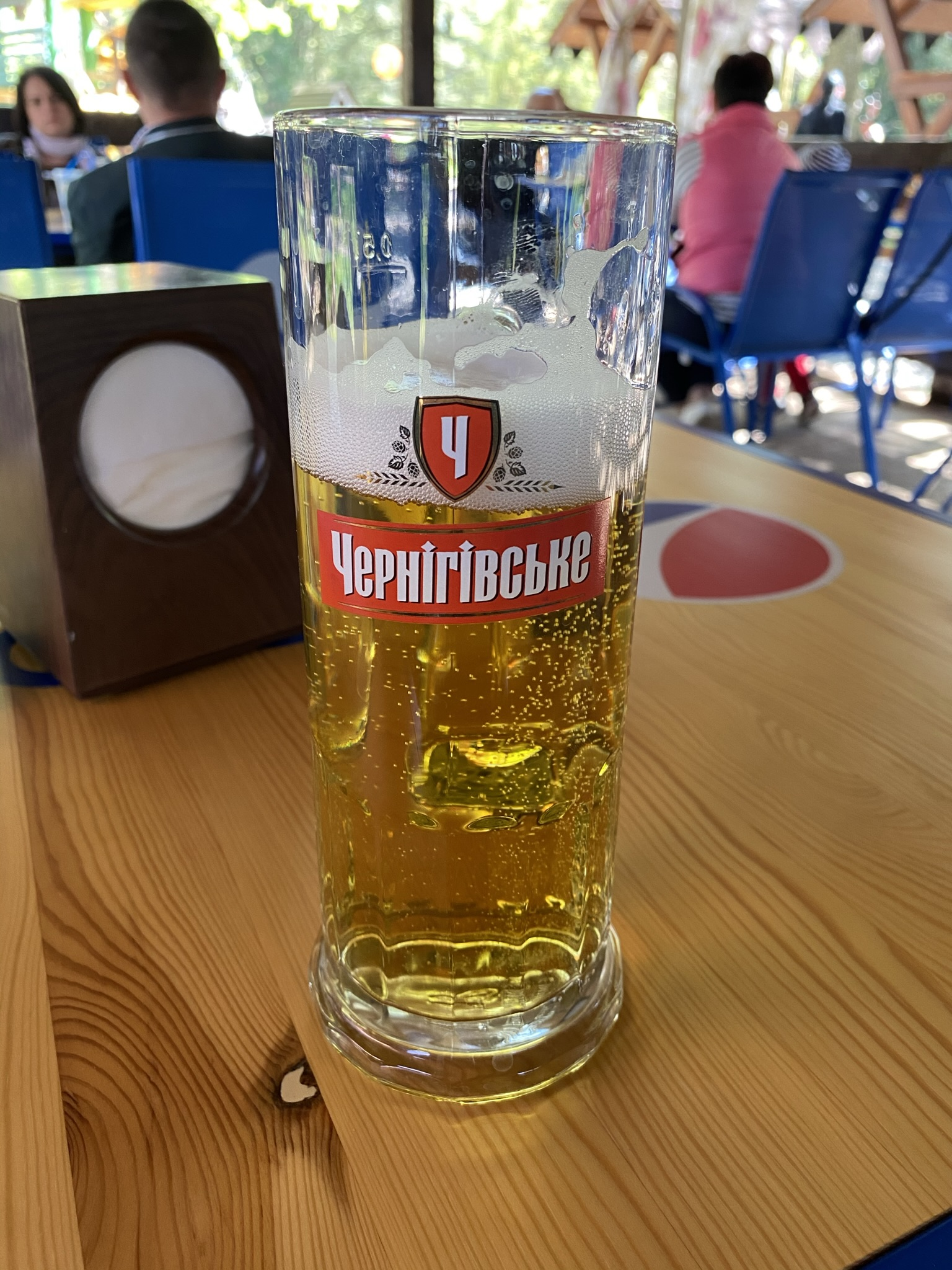
Chernihivske beer in a restaurant at Ivano-Frankivsk

The breweries are currently owned by SUN InBev Ukraine, a subsidiary of AB InBev. In April 2022, AB InBev announced that it would be brewing Chernihivske in several countries including the United States, the United Kingdom, the Netherlands, Canada, Belgium, and Germany, with profits going towards supporting humanitarian relief efforts in Ukraine following the 2022 Russian invasion.

== Types ==
- Light (Світле): 4.8% ABV
- Premium (Преміум): 5.6% ABV
- Strong (Міцне): 7.5% ABV
- Dark (Темне): 6.0% ABV
- White (Біле): 5.0% ABV- First unfiltered beer on the Ukrainian market
- White Night (Біла Нiч): 5.0% ABV
- White Honey (Білий Мед): 5.0% ABV
- Purple (Багряне): 5.2% ABV

== Sponsorship ==
In different periods of time Chernigivske:

- supported the Olympic National Team of Ukraine,
- was the official sponsor of the Football Championship of Ukraine,
- was the official sponsor of National Football Team of Ukraine,
- was the national partner of the Eurovision Song Contest,
- supported different social initiatives and programs.

== See also ==
- Beer in Ukraine
