= Mykulyntsi Castle =

Castle in Mykulyntsi, Ukraine

- Микулинецький замок
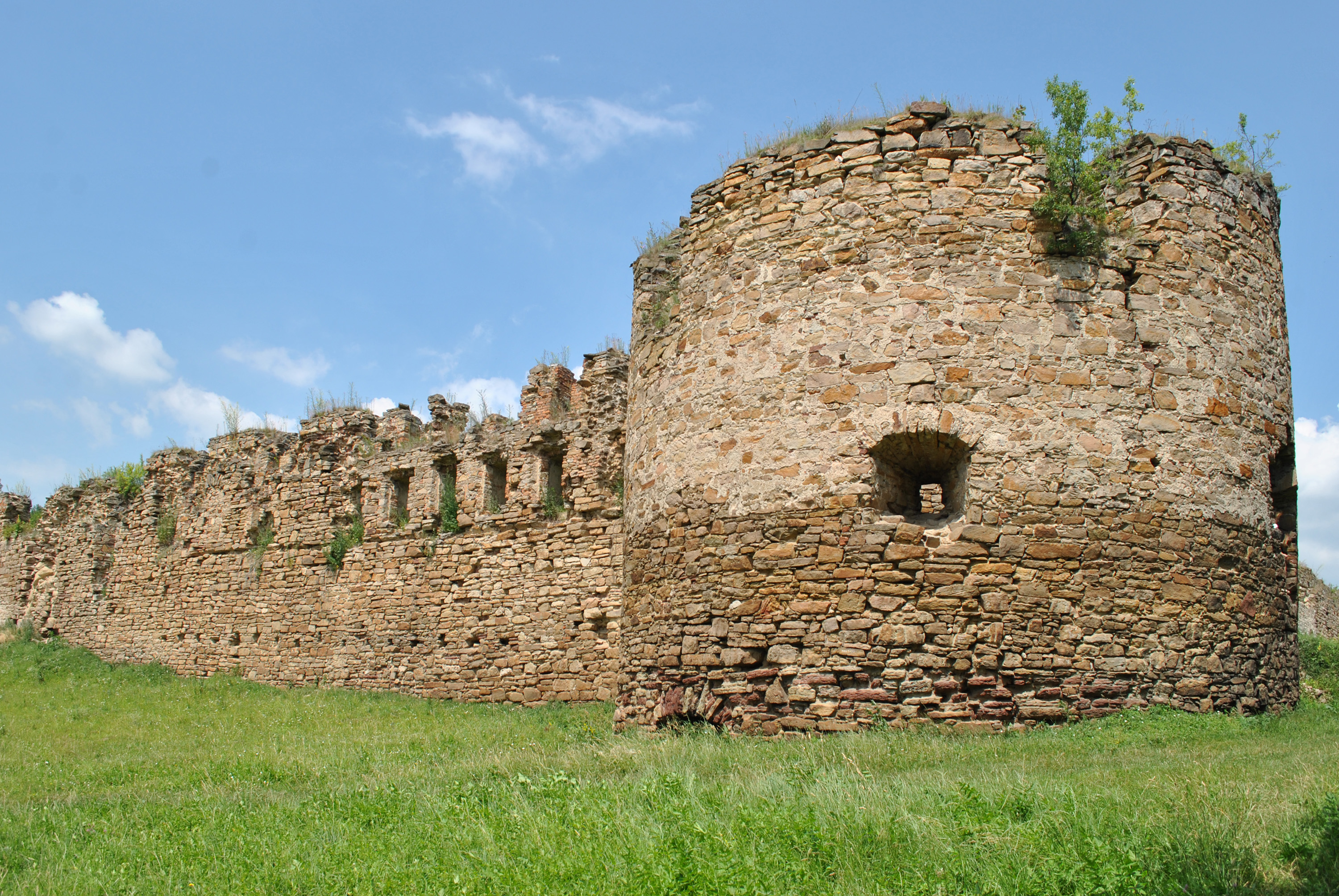
- The wall and tower of Mykulyntsi Castle

General information
- Status: Architectural monument of national importance
- Location: Mykulyntsi, Ternopil Raion, Ternopil Oblast, Ukraine
- Coordinates: 49°23′49″N 25°36′33″E

Immovable Monument of National Significance of Ukraine
- Official name: Замок (Castle)
- Type: Architecture
- Reference no.: 190015

The Mykulyntsi Castle (Ukrainian: Микулинецький замок, romanized: Mykulynets'kyi zamok) is a castle built in 1550 in Mykulyntsi of the Ternopil Oblast by Anna Jordanowa from the Sieniawski family, wife of Spytek Wawrzyniec Jordan in Zakliczyn, castellan of Kraków. It is an architectural monument of national significance.

== History ==
The stronghold, located on a mountain on the right bank of the Seret River, was frequently attacked and invaded, as it stood on the so-called Tartar route. In 1675, during the invasion of Ibrahim Szyszman, the castle was besieged by the Turks; after a 15-day defense, it surrendered on the condition that the crew and residents be let go. The invaders did not honor the agreement. The commanders (including the commandant of the castle, a certain Orchyjowski, with his three sons) were murdered by being impaled, while the rest of the defenders were abducted into slavery. For a period the fortress was the seat of the Zborowski family, given as a dowry by Zofia, daughter of Spytek Wawrzyniec Jordan, who married Samuel Zborowski. In 1637, the stronghold was purchased by Stanislaw Koniecpolski, castellan of Kraków and Grand Hetman of the Crown. Subsequent owners of the castle were the Sieniawski, Lubomirski and Mniszech families. At the end of the 19th century, the castle was converted into stables.

== Palace in Mykulyntsi ==
From the mid-18th century, the owner of the castle was Ludwika Potocka of the Mniszech family, castellan of Krakow, who bought the estate from the Lubomirskis and built the current palace. In 1792 the owner of the palace was the baron Konopka family. At the beginning of the 19th century Jan Konopka arranged a cloth factory in part of the castle halls, which could not withstand competition from factories existing in the western Austrian provinces. The palace now houses a physical therapy sanatorium. The former interiors were adapted for medical activities and no longer have stylish features.

== Architecture ==
The castle in the 16th century was a residential building with four wings 75 meters long and large cellars. Its outer walls were 2 meters thick. Inside the fortress was a courtyard, accessed by entrance gates, located on the east and west sides. Towers three stories high with gun emplacements stood at three corners.

== Gallery ==
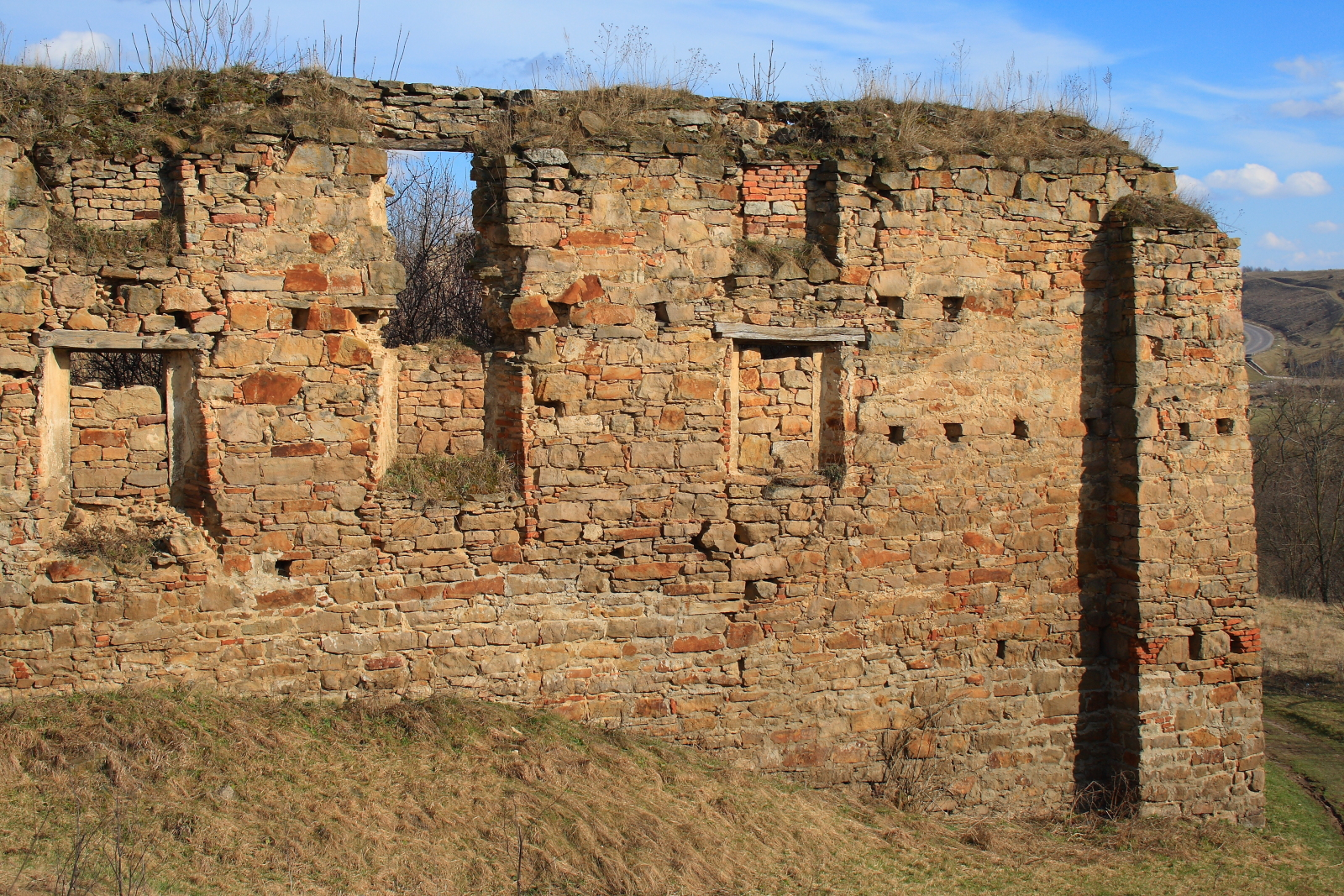
Castle ruins at present

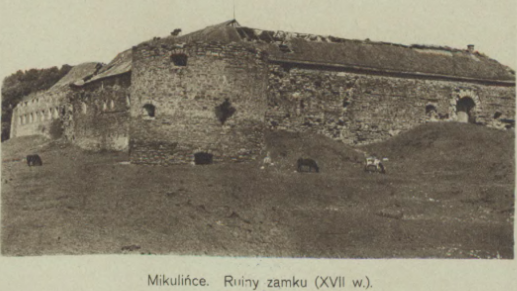
Castle ruins before 1939

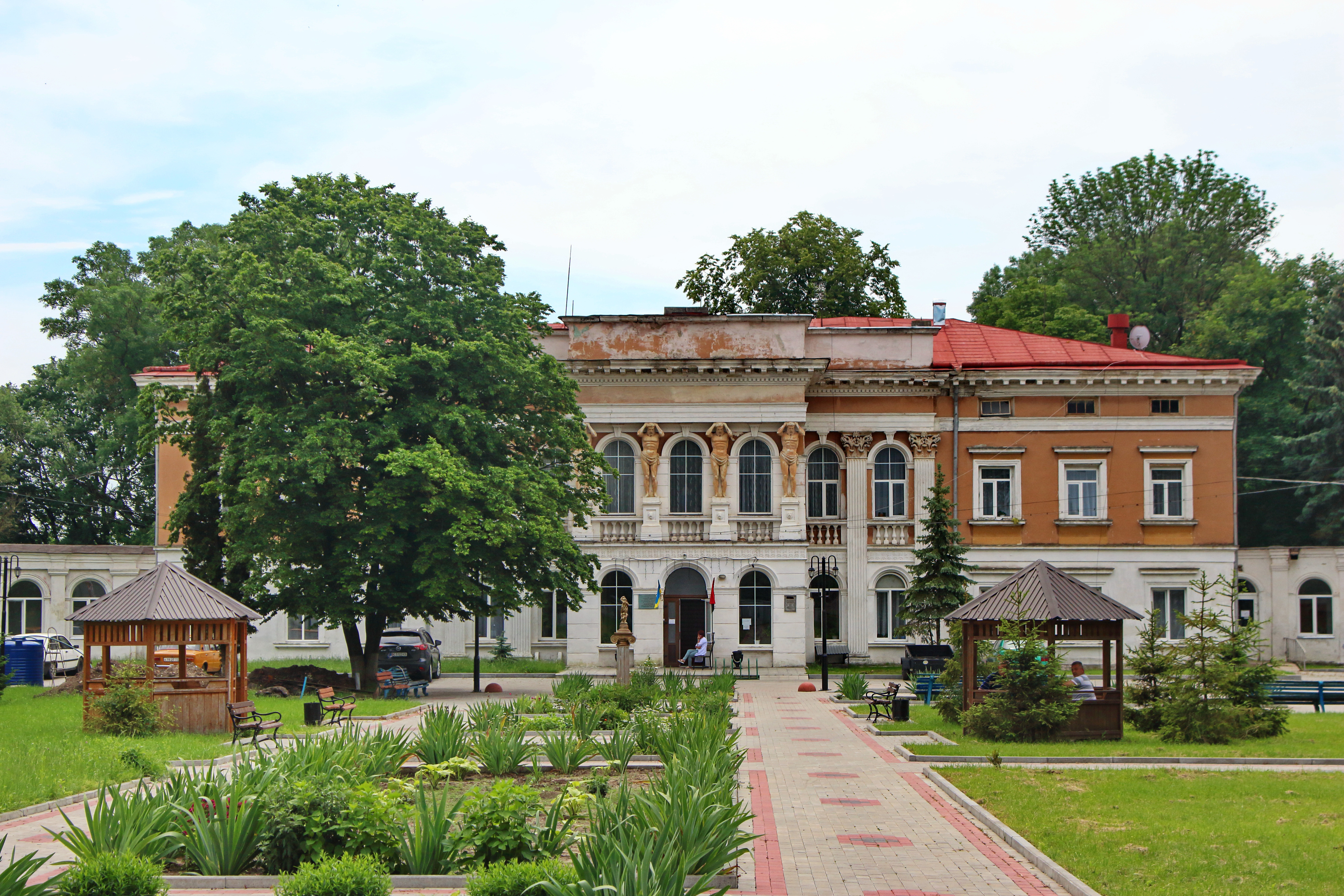
Palace

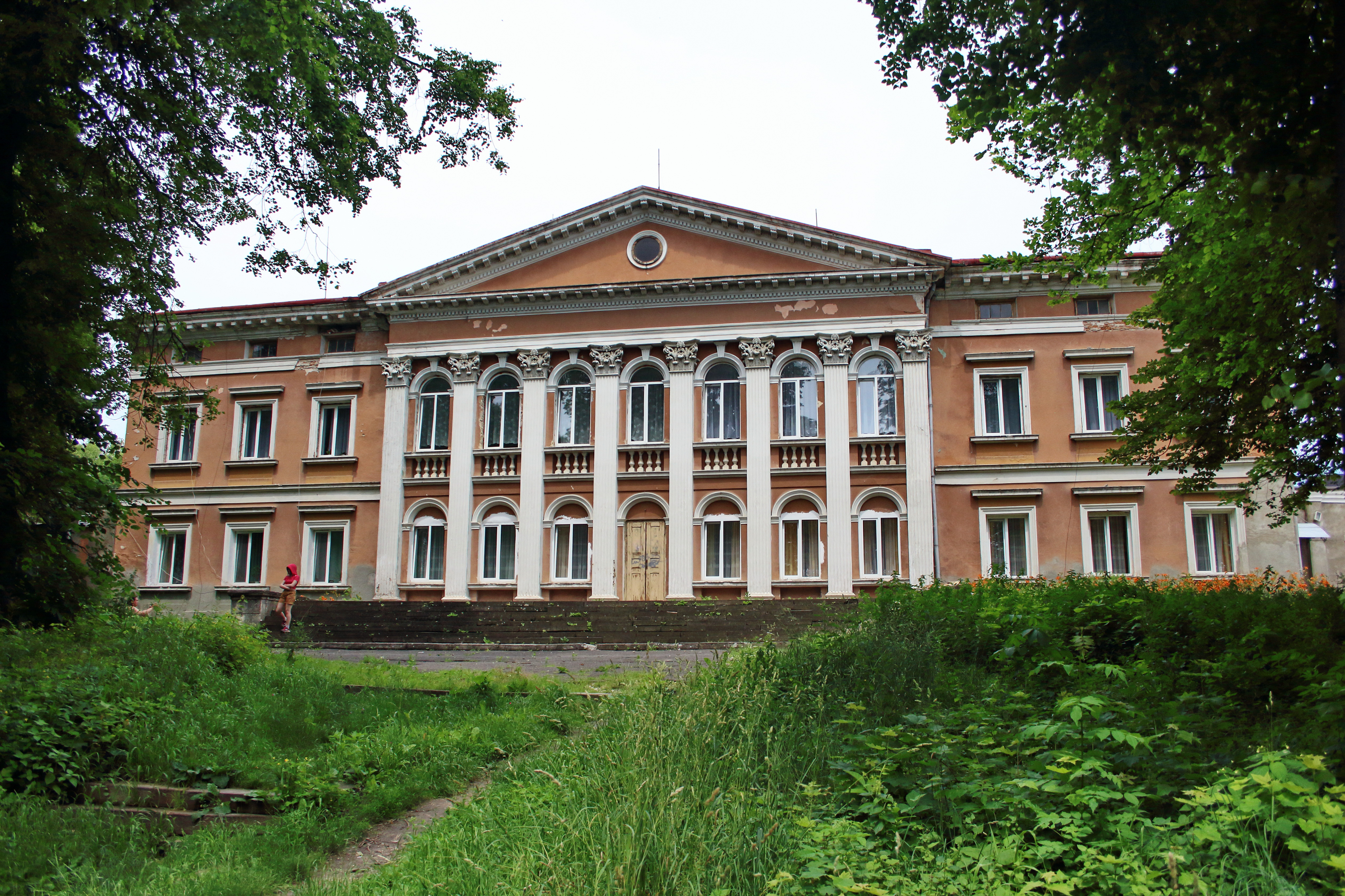
Palace from the side of the park

== Bibliography ==
- "Mikulińce". Geographical Dictionary of the Kingdom of Poland (in Polish). 6. Warszawa: Kasa im. Józefa Mianowskiego. 1885. p. 412—414.
