= Mykulyntsi =

Rural locality in Ternopil Oblast, Ukraine

Mykulyntsi Микулинці
- Rural settlement
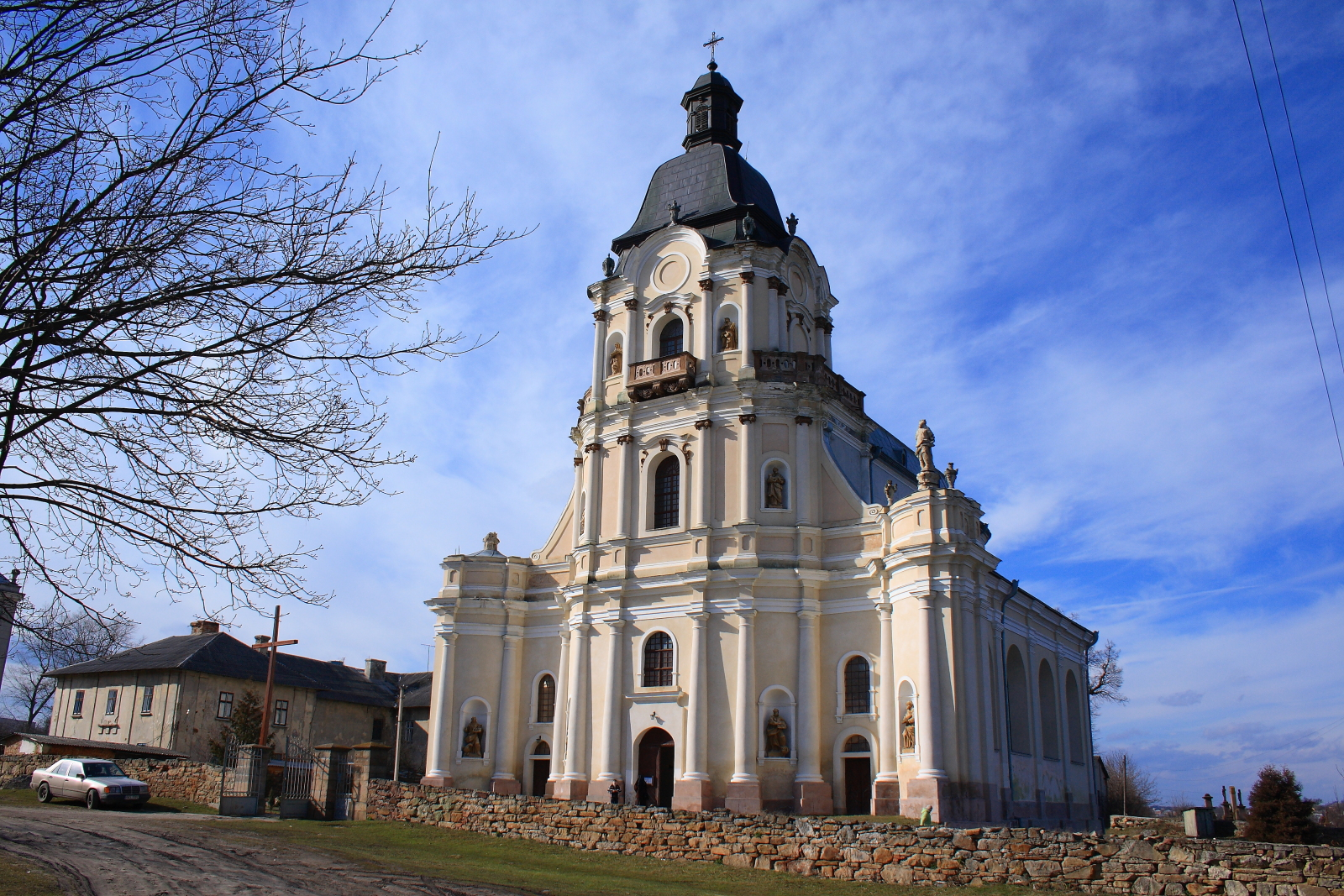
- 18th century Baroque Trinity Church in Mykulyntsi

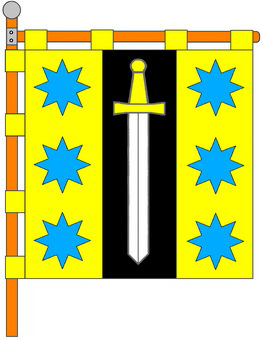
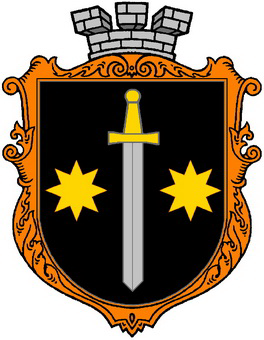
- Flag Coat of arms

- Location of Mykulyntsi in Ternopil Oblast Location of Mykulyntsi in Ukraine
- Coordinates: 49°23′17″N 25°37′03″E
- Country: Ukraine
- Oblast: Ternopil Oblast
- Raion: Ternopil Raion
- Hromada: Mykulyntsi settlement hromada
- Founded: 1096
- Town status: 1939

Government
  - Town Head: Roman Vavrukh

Area
  - Total: 4 km^{2} (1.5 sq mi)
- Elevation: 305 m (1,001 ft)

Population (2022)
  - Total: 3,568
  - Density: 890/km^{2} (2,300/sq mi)
- Time zone: UTC+2 (EET)
  - Summer (DST): UTC+3 (EEST)
- Postal code: 48120
- Area code: +380 3551
- Website: http://rada.gov.ua/

Mykulyntsi (Ukrainian: Микулинці; Polish: Mikulińce; Yiddish: מיקיליניץ, romanized: Mikolintza) is a rural settlement in Ternopil Raion, Ternopil Oblast, western Ukraine. The settlement lies on the banks of the Seret River, a tributary of the Dniester. It hosts the administration of Mykulyntsi settlement hromada, one of the hromadas of Ukraine. Population: 3,568 (2022 estimate).

== History ==
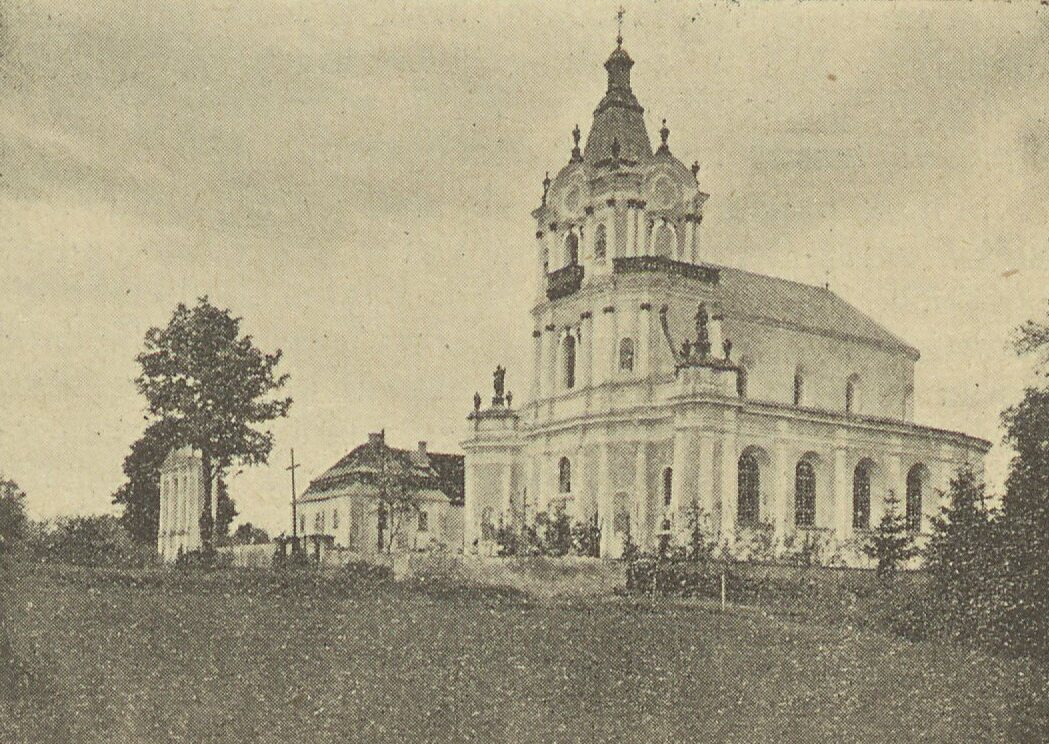
Holy Trinity Church, 1936

A settlement named Mykulyn (Ukrainian: Микулин) was first mentioned in 1096 in Vladimir Monomakh's "Guidelines" during times of the Kievan Rus' in what is now the town's current location. In 1387, the settlement was then called by its current name—Mykulyntsi. In 1595, Mykulyntsi acquired the Magdeburg rights, which was later relinquished during the Polish-Ottoman Wars, so at the request of Augustus III of Poland, Mykulyntsi regained the rights on 16 December 1758. In 1939, the settlement was upgraded to that of an urban-type settlement.

Until 18 July 2020, Mykulyntsi belonged to Terebovlia Raion. The raion was abolished in July 2020 as part of the administrative reform of Ukraine, which reduced the number of raions of Ternopil Oblast to three. The area of Terebovlia Raion was merged into Ternopil Raion. On 26 January 2024, a new law entered into force which abolished the status of urban-type settlement, and Mykulyntsi became a rural settlement.

== Features ==
In the town there are ruins of an old castle, which dates back to 1610. The castle was rebuilt in the 18th century, but by the beginning of the 20th century, the fortification served no use and it was left to disrepair. There is also the Baroque Trinity Church in Mykulyntsi, which was designed by architect Polish August Moszyński and built from 1761 to 1779. The town is home to Mikulinetsky Brovar, one of the oldest breweries in the country.

== Gallery ==
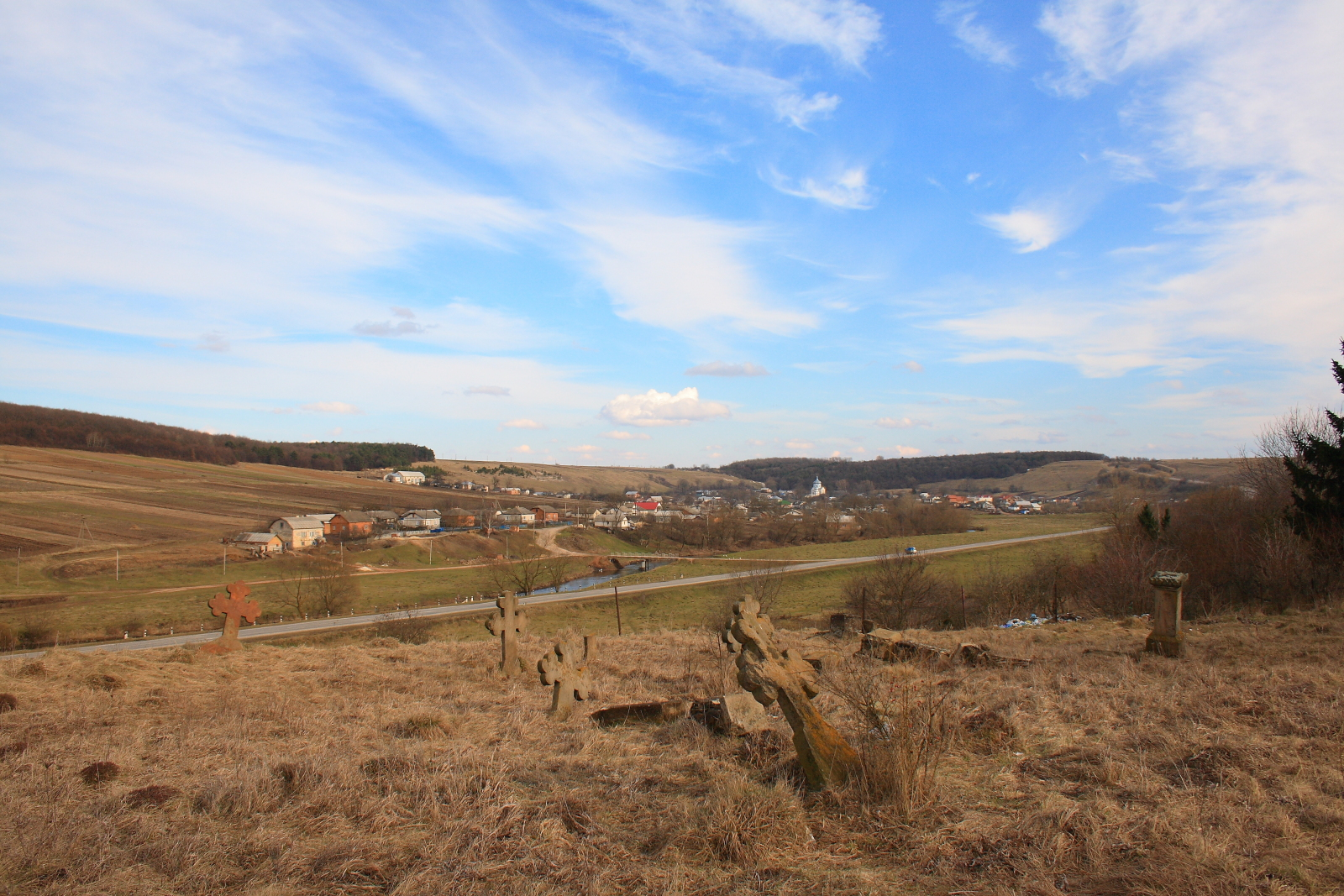
Panorama of Mykulyntsi

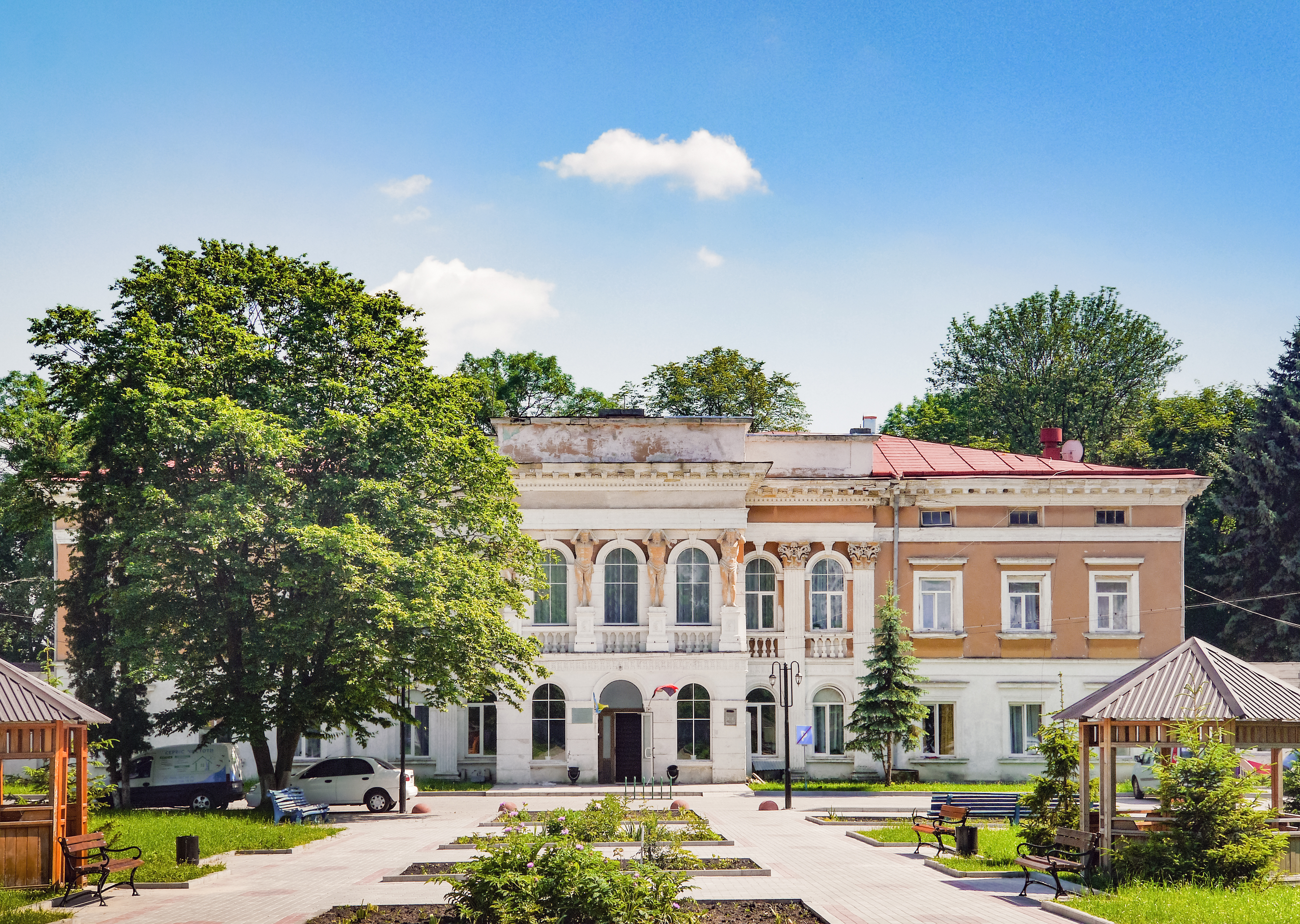
Potocki Palace in Mykulyntsi, built in the 1860s

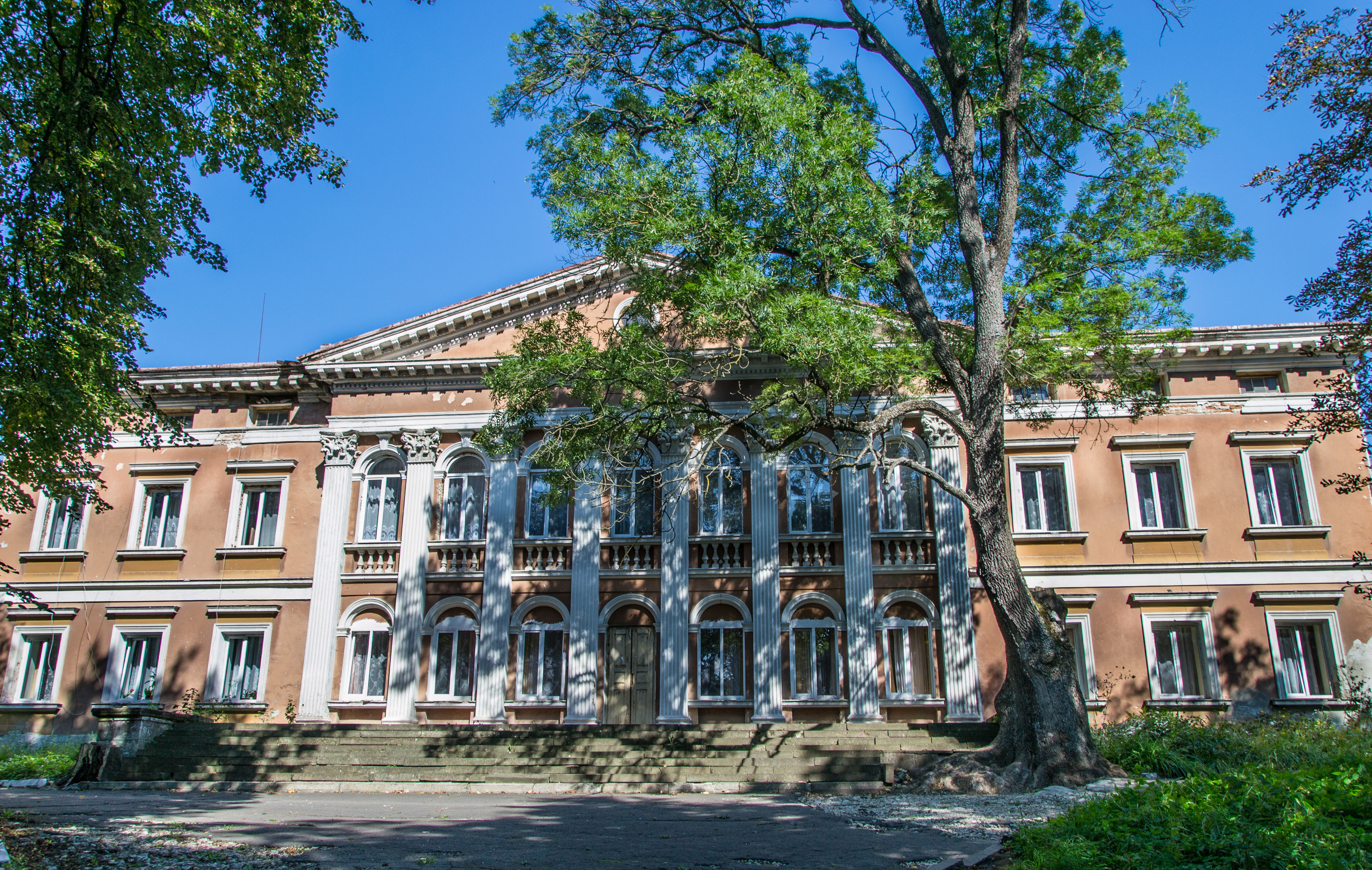
Potocki Palace.

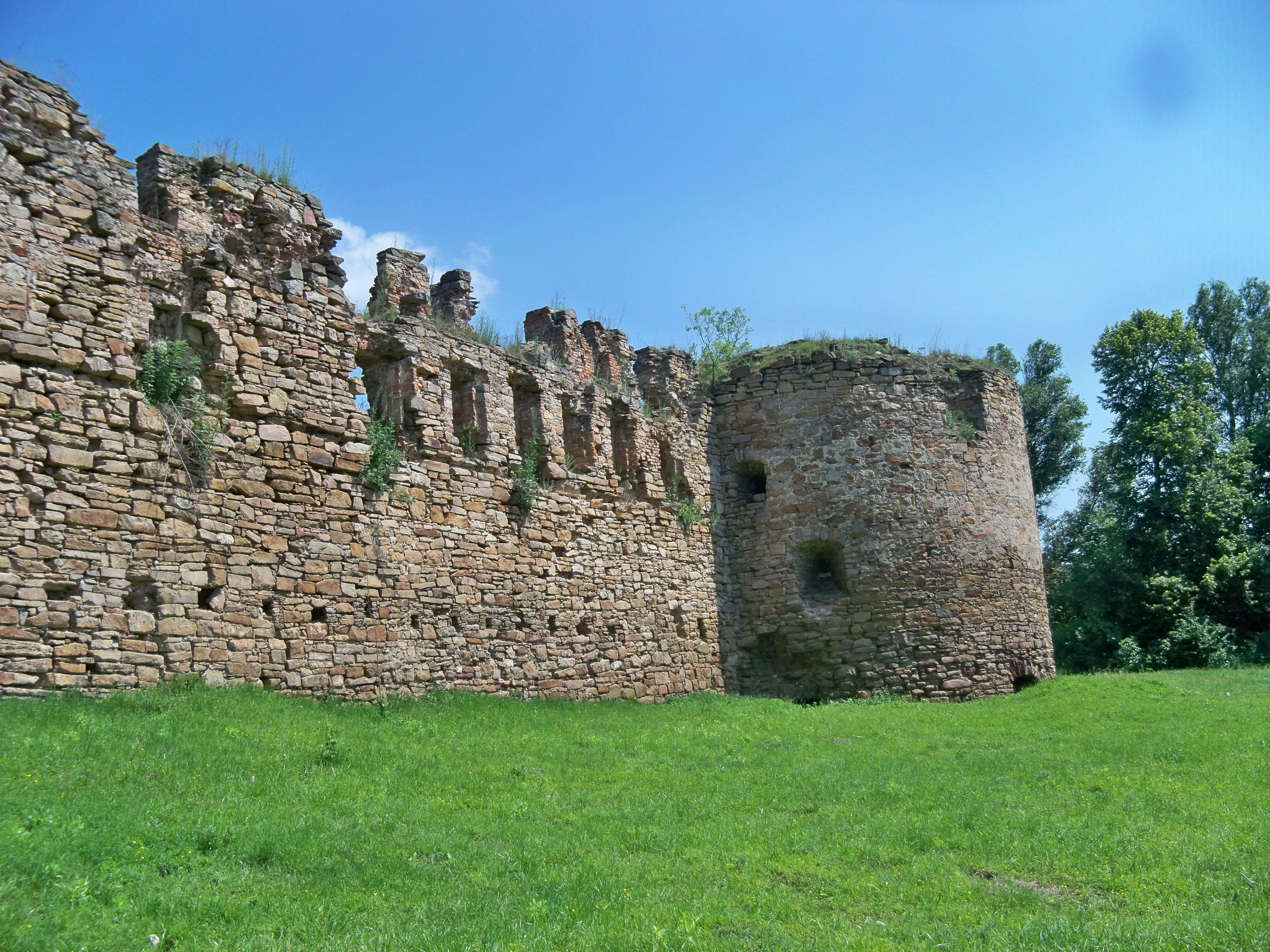
Castle

== People from Mykulyntsi ==
- Janusz Morgenstern (1922–2011), Polish film director and producer.

== International relations ==
=== Twin towns – Sister cities ===
Mykulyntsi is twinned with

- Sędziszów, Poland

== See also ==
- Druzhba, the other urban-type settlement in Terebovlia Raion of Ternopil Oblast
