= Klepariv =

Klepariv Клепарів
- Historical district
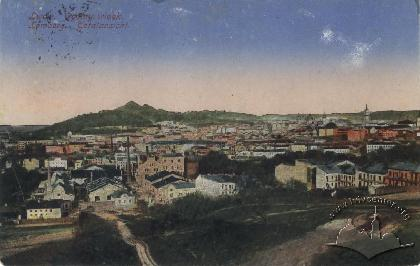
- Klepariv in 1915
- Interactive map of Klepariv
- Coordinates: 49°51′1″N 24°0′39″E
- Country: Ukraine
- City: Lviv

Klepariv (Ukrainian: Клепарів, Polish: Kleparów, Russian: Клепаров) is a former suburb of the city of Lviv in Ukraine, now forming part of the city proper. The Yaniv cemetery in Klepariv was founded in 1883.

Klepariv has a railway station.

== History ==
The earliest record of Klepariv dates to the 13th century, when Daniel of Galicia built fortifications in the area to better defend Lviv against the Tatars. It was named for the German nobleman Ganko Klepper, who bought the rights to distribute beer on Krakowskie Przedmieście in Lviv. The original name of Klepperhof eventually became Polonized to Kleparów.

Between 1535 and 1560 the community became known for its good soils, ponds and grapes, which brought it fame along with its bleached linens. In the middle of the century residents cultivated and grew the widely-exported Griotte de Kleparow (Sour Cherry of Kleparów). An iron gate was installed in the middle of the 19th century; in 1908 a tram ran through Kleparów. From the middle of the 19th century to the early 1940s a portion of Kleparów had a large Jewish population.

During World War II, between 1941 and 1943, when Ukraine was under Nazi occupation, Klepariv became a ghetto. Hunger, malnutrition, scurvy, typhus and tuberculosis were common. Much of the district was destroyed when the Jewish population was deported to death camps.

A Nazi concentration camp functioned in the vicinity of Klepariv railway station, where over 6500 Jews were murdered during three days in May 1943. Following the discovery of Katyn massacre, the camp authorities exhumed the victims' bodies and destroyed their remains with the help of a Sonderkommando, whose members were later also executed. The surviving inmates were evacuated amid the Soviet advance in July 1944.

== Landmarks ==
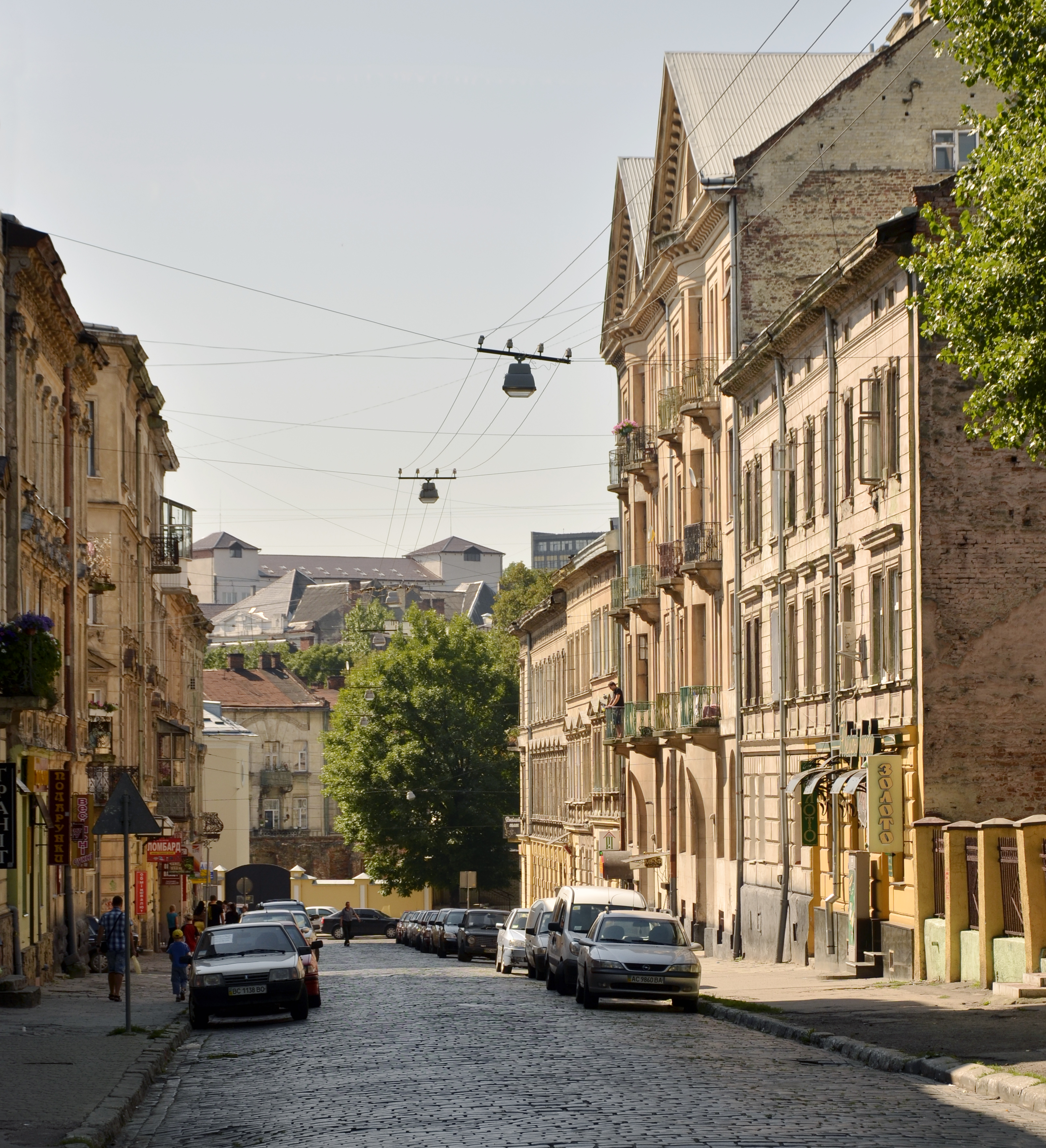
Kleparivska Street

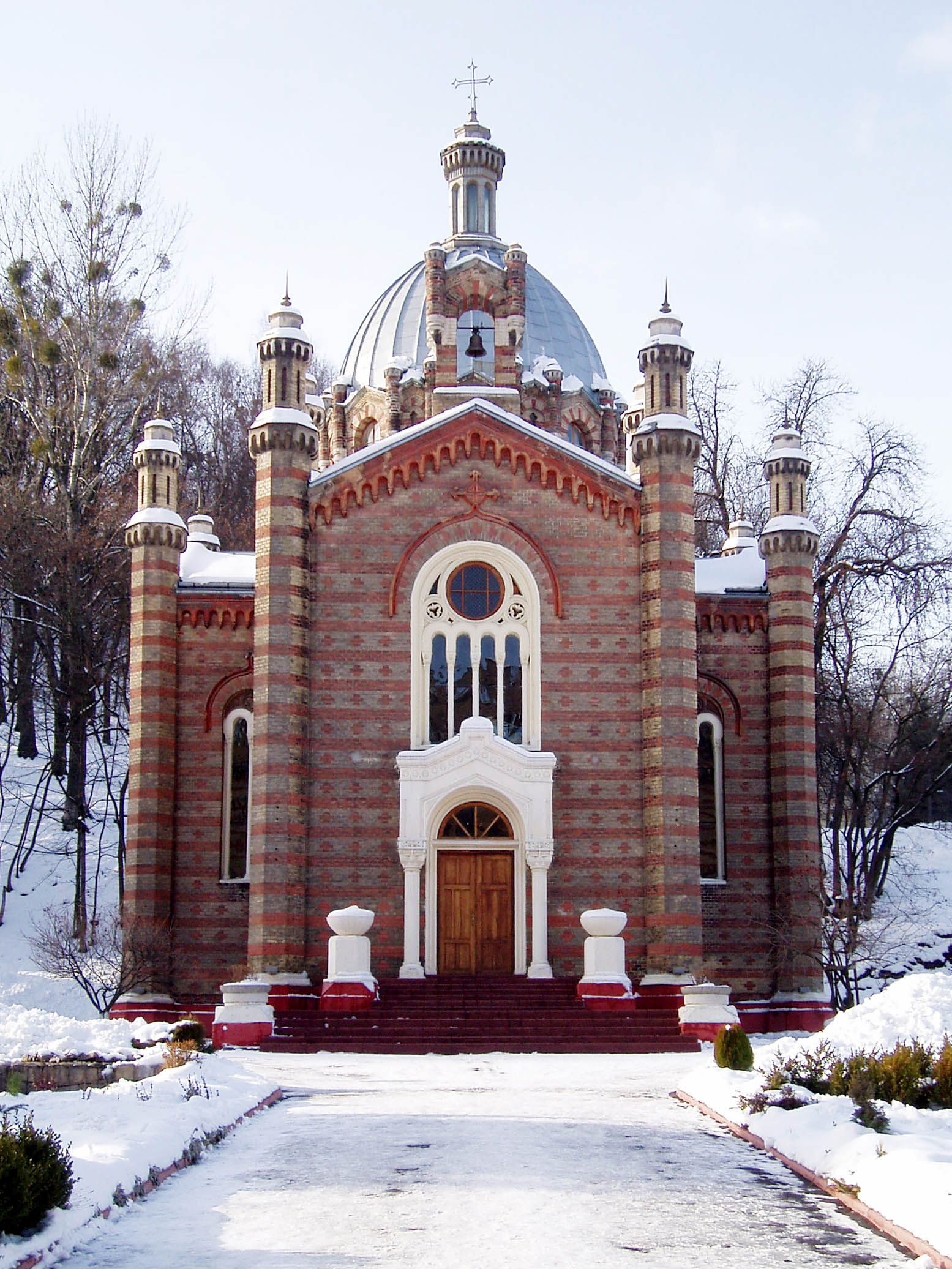
Chapel of the House of Military Invalids (now Church of the Intercession of the Theotokos) built by Theophil Hansen

- Mound of Executions (Ukrainian: Гора Страт, Polish: Góra Stracenia) Located at the foot of a hill between the House of Invalids and Kleparivska Street. Criminals were executed here for two centuries. In 1847 two Polish nationalists, Teofil Wisniewski and Josef Kapuscinski, were hanged here for organizing an anti-Austrian uprising. The city's vice-mayor, Michal Michalski, led the effort to have the small marble obelisk placed on the site in 1895. It sits on a large stone pedestal with a memorial plaque sculpted by Yulian Markovski. The park was later named for Wisniewski.

In 1914, during World War I, the Austrians executed many Ukrainian Russophiles on the site for their open sympathies, and sometimes spying for, Russia, Austria's enemy in that conflict. The park was thus renamed Partisan Park during the Soviet era.

- Krakiv (Krakow) Market, erected in the 1950s on the site of a synagogue destroyed by the Nazis.
- Rappaport. Until 1939 it was Bet Chulim, a Jewish hospital. During the Soviet era it was divided into three separate hospitals. The building was designed by Ivan Levynskyi in the Moorish Revival architectural style and decorated with many Eastern and Jewish symbols, similar to many well-known synagogues in Budapest.
- 40 and 40-a Zolota: Before 1940 this was the home stadium of Jewish football club Hasmonea Lwów. During the Soviet period it was home to Torpedo. In the 1980s it was the site of an electronics black market.
- 4 Zolota: Before the Soviet era it was the city orphanage. Since then it has been a hostel for the Lviv Institute of Economics and Tourism.
- 8 Zolota: Galician campus of the Interregional Academy of Personnel Management and hostel for the Lviv Cooperative College of Economics and Law.
- 3 Shveds'ka: Lviv perfumery and cosmetics factory.
- 16 Baturyns'ka: Headquarters of the Western Operating Command (formerly headquarters of the Carpathian Military District).
- 11 Veteraniv: Before the Soviet period, Seminary No. 6; since then, Musical-Pedagogical School No. 2 and incomplete Ukrainian Middle School No. 53.
- 20 Bazarna: Institute of Pipeline Construction during the Soviet era; when it went bankrupt following Ukraine's independence it was converted into a trade pavilion.
- 2 Leontovycha: Coeducational St. Anne's School before the Soviet era, Russian Elementary School No. 5 and Middle School No. 23 and Olympic-reserve sports school during it, and since then Lviv regional Ukrainian law gymnasium.

== See also ==
- Griotte de Kleparow, a fruit first cultivated in this region
