= Mykulynetsky Brovar =

Brewery in Ukraine

- Mykulynetsky Brovar bottling line, 2019
- Location: Mykulyntsi, Ternopil Oblast, Ukraine
- Opened: 1497
- Website: https://www.brovar.org/

Mykulynetsky Brovar (Ukrainian: ПАТ "Микулинецький Бровар") is an independent brewery in Ukraine and manufacturer of beer, alcohol, mineral water, and soft drinks. One of the oldest breweries in the country, it was founded in 1497 and since then has produced beer with a production process that includes manufacturing its own malt. As of 2017, the brewery produces 17 beers and is the only company in Ukraine with a license for whiskey production. Mykulynetsky Brovar has affiliation with Konig Ludwig in Germany, for whom it brews and bottles Kaltenberg Spezial, a German Pilsner. All of Mykulynetsky Brovar's beer is unpasteurized.

== History ==
The first Austrian archives of a brewery in Mykulyntsi date to 1698. Polish records suggest that the brewery was founded in 1497, which is the date used in the company's official history. Beer started when Tieran, a German ally of the King of the Polish–Lithuanian Commonwealth, stopped in Mykulyntsi and sent some beer to his leadership during the military campaign. This first production accounts for the brewery's slogan: "Beer Brewed for the King".

In the early 20th century, the brewery produced three lines of draught and bottled beer. The brewery was purchased by Averman, Tsikhovski & Co., who in 1928 installed an extra cellar, dry house and malt house. In September 1939, the company and its facilities were nationalized after the Soviet invasion of western Ukraine.

The company privatized in 1993 as a publicly owned plant. In 1995 the company transformed into an open joint stock company and the company took its current name, Brovar, or brewer.

== Production ==
Mykulynetsky Brovar produces its own malt using locally grown raw materials. None of the brewery's production line is pasteurized, which is believed by many Ukrainian consumers to be healthier.

Production has expanded rapidly. In 2001, a thorough modernization of the brewery started. By 2004, the brewery produced four times more beer than 1993. Today, the brewery operates with state-of-the-art German equipment.

The brewery's most popular beer is the "Mykulyn", which accounts for approximately half of its total volume of sales. Its second and third bestsellers are the "Mykulynetske medove" and "Mykulyn-900". Most of its beer is consumed locally: as of 2018, the Ternopil region accounts for 67% of its volume. Recently, several new varieties have been developed using more modern technology.

In 2008, the brewery started production of whiskey, in a single-malt variety. The malt is taken directly from its own production.

As of 2019, the company offers tours of its facilities. A nearby restaurant of the company also serves its products.
