= Griotte de Kleparow =

Edible fruit cultivar

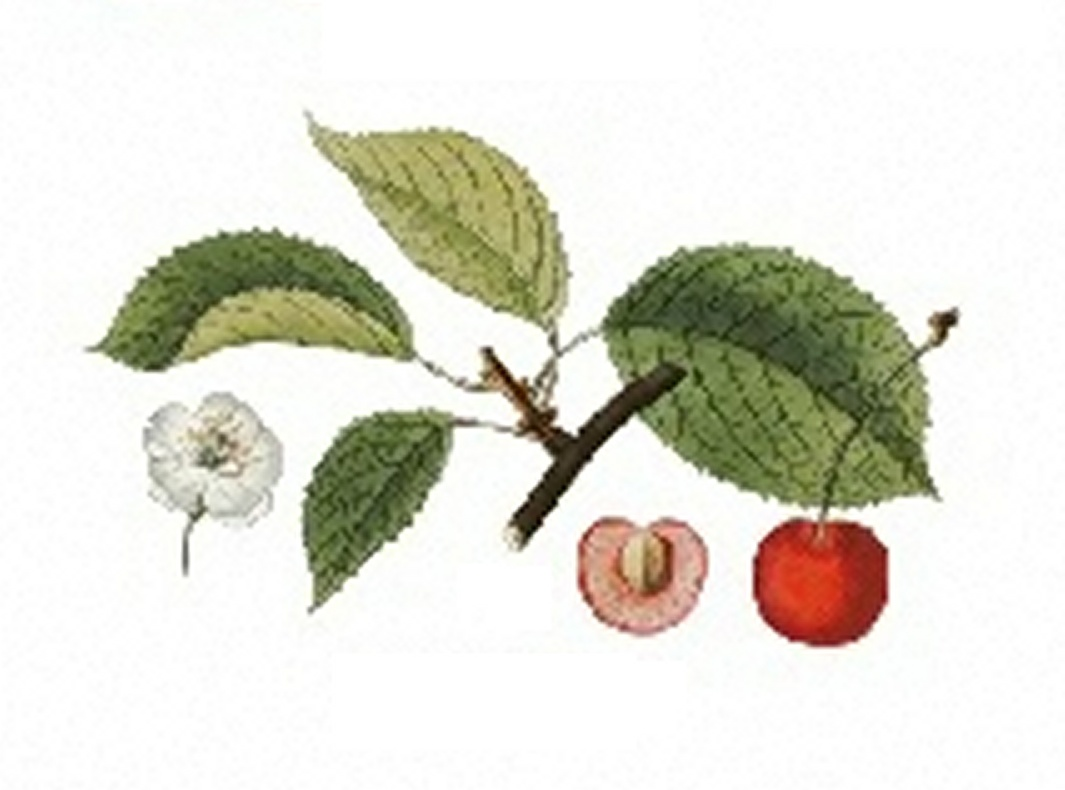
- Leaves and fruit (unripe) of 'Griotte de Kleparow'. When ripe, the fruit is a dark brownish-red.
- Genus: Prunus
- Species: Prunus cerasus
- Hybrid parentage: Either cultivar of Prunus cerasus or hybrid of Prunus cerasus × Prunus avium
- Cultivar: 'Griotte de Kleparow'
- Origin: Klepariv (Kleparów), a suburb of Lviv, 16th century

Griotte de Kleparow (Ukrainian: Череха клепарівська, Polish: Wiśnia Kleparowska, French: Griotte de Kleparow, German: Kleparower Süssweichsel, lit. 'Sweet Cherry of Klepariv') is a dark-red morello, or Griotte, type of cherry which originated from the outskirts of Lviv, modern Ukraine.

== Origin and history ==
The 'Griotte de Kleparow' was first selected and grown in the historical area of Klepariv, now a suburb of the city of Lviv, Ukraine. It is of unknown parentage, although it is probably a cultivar of sour cherry (Prunus cerasus). One source states that it is a hybrid of sour cherry and wild cherry (Prunus avium).

In 1555 Lviv's city council issued a law ordering its citizens to protect this variety of tree and encouraging its cultivation. This variety became very popular in the 18th and 19th centuries, and its cultivation spread to other parts of Europe, the United States, and Australia.

It was first botanically described in 1792 by Johann Kraft in his Pomona Austriaca. The first known use of the term 'Griotte de Kleparow' was in Great Britain in 1831, and thereafter this was the most commonly used name internationally in botanical and pomological literature.

In Ukraine, the cultivation of 'Griotte de Kleparow' was neglected in the 1930s and it probably has disappeared. Worldwide, the number of cherry cultivars grown has been dramatically reduced, and this variety is no longer commercially grown. It is probably extinct in most countries, though there is some interest in its preservation in France by a heritage fruit society.

In 2021, a group of activists bought ten 'Griotte de Kleparow' saplings to initiate the return of the cherry cultivar to Lviv. In 2022 the saplings were planted at the botanical garden of the University of Lviv, and the possibility of purchasing certified saplings to inhabitants of Lviv was planned.

== General description ==
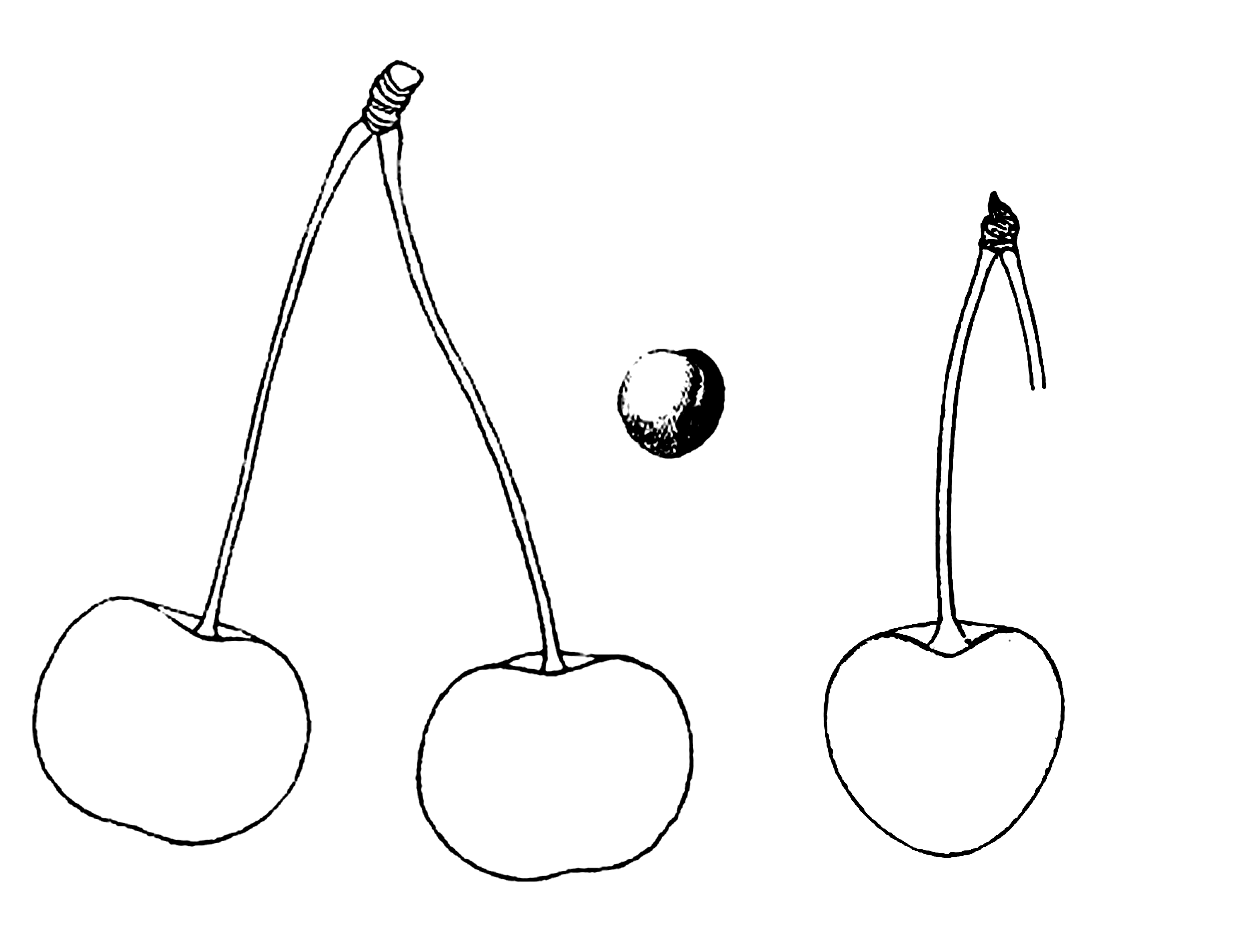
Variations in fruit of 'Griotte de Kleparow'. Fruit on the left is the more typical shape (source: from Illustriertes Handbuch der Obstkunde, 1875), while the fruit on the right is from Dictionnaire de Pomologie, 1877.

The characteristics of the cultivar have been described in a number of texts:

Tree: strong in growth, large, productive. Branches long, slender, and drooping.

Leaves: Summer leaves have light green color with little red nuances. Big leaves, are oval and extended, have a long and sharp end, and are very dented, supported by short, strong, red leaf stalks. Stipules are of medium length, a bit extended at the base, strongly dented. Leaves during period of fruit production have short ends, shrunken at their base, have intense green color and are supported by medium-length leaf stalks.

Flowers: medium or rather small, elliptic, concave petals, covering partially each other; short, a little bit large, almost sharp, strong red divisions of calyx. Pedicel is short and strong.

Fruit: medium size, generally attached in pairs, roundish-cordate to roundish-oblate, sides often compressed; suture shallow, often a line; stem long, slender, set in a wide, deep cavity. Skin tough, clinging to the flesh, glossy, dark brownish-red, deep black when ripe. Stalk 50 mm long. It ripens at the end of July.

Flesh: tender, fibrous, light to dark colored, juicy, with a rich, sweet and sub-acid flavor, aromatic; quality fair.

Pit: small, turgid, almost spherical.

Propagation: The cultivar can be grown from seed.

== Uses ==
Griotte is the French word for Morello cherry (a type of sour cherry), and the 'Griotte de Kleparow' is distinguished from other sour cherry varieties like the Montmorency cherry by having darker flesh and juice. The cultivar became popular in Europe for use as a table (dessert) fruit and for making cherry juice.

In Germany in 1824, Lippold and Boumann described it as follows:

A very appreciable cherry with dark brown colored juice, maturing in August, and just as good for preserving, as it is for cherry juice. The tree becomes very large, and is very commendable, since it fruits annually and plentifully and never suffers from frost.

In the United States, an 1837 nursery catalog offered grown plants for sale for $0.75 to $1.00 each, and described the trees as "acquiring a medium height, with compact and spherical heads, and able to sustain severe northern climates." It also stated that the cultivar was "most esteemed for quality" and "best for tarts, wine and preserves."

In Great Britain, in 1842 the cultivar was listed as one of 61 cherry varieties "worthy of cultivation" and useful for the table (dessert).

== Other names ==
'Griotte de Kleparow' has many synonyms in botanical and pomological literature. Some of the synonyms include:

- Череха клепарівська
- Prunus caproniana Schübl. var. kleparoviensis Zaw.
- Belle de Kleparow
- Belle Polonaise
- Bonne Polonaise
- Cerise de Kleparow
- Czerecha kleparowska
- Griotte Kleparite
- Kleparovka
- Kleparovoska
- Kleparower Süssweichsel
- Kleparower Weichsel
- Kleparower
- Kleparowska
- Pohlnische Weichsel
- Polnische grosse Weichsel
- Polnische Kirsche
- Polnische Weichsel
- Ratafia polonica
