= Lvivske =

Trademark

- Type: Beer
- Origin: Ukraine
- Introduced: 1715
- Alcohol by volume: 3,8-8 %
- Related products: Robert Doms
- Website: https://carlsbergukraine.com

Lvivske (Ukrainian: Львівське) is a brand of Ukrainian beer produced by the Lviv Brewery since 1715 (currently PJSC Carlsberg Ukraine, part of the Carlsberg Group).

== History ==
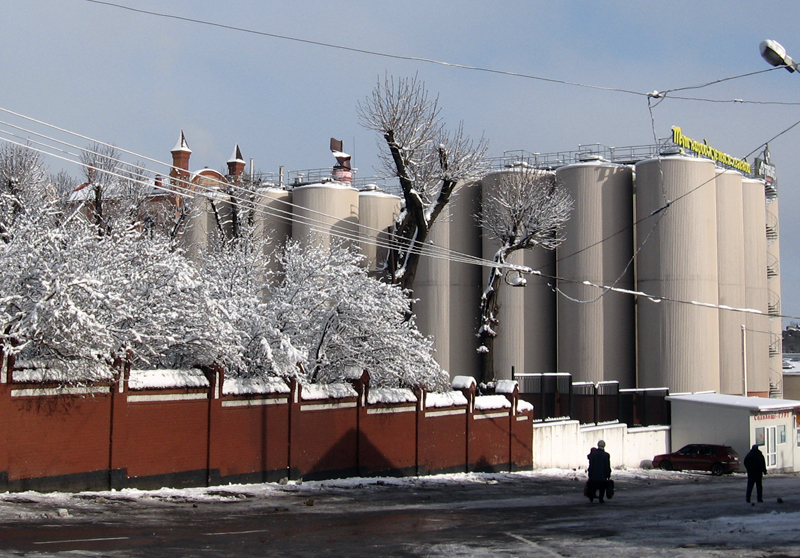
Lviv Brewery, 2007

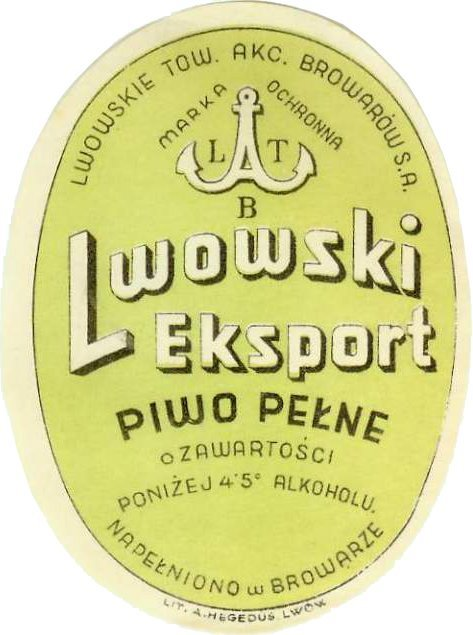
Lwowski Eksport, 1921

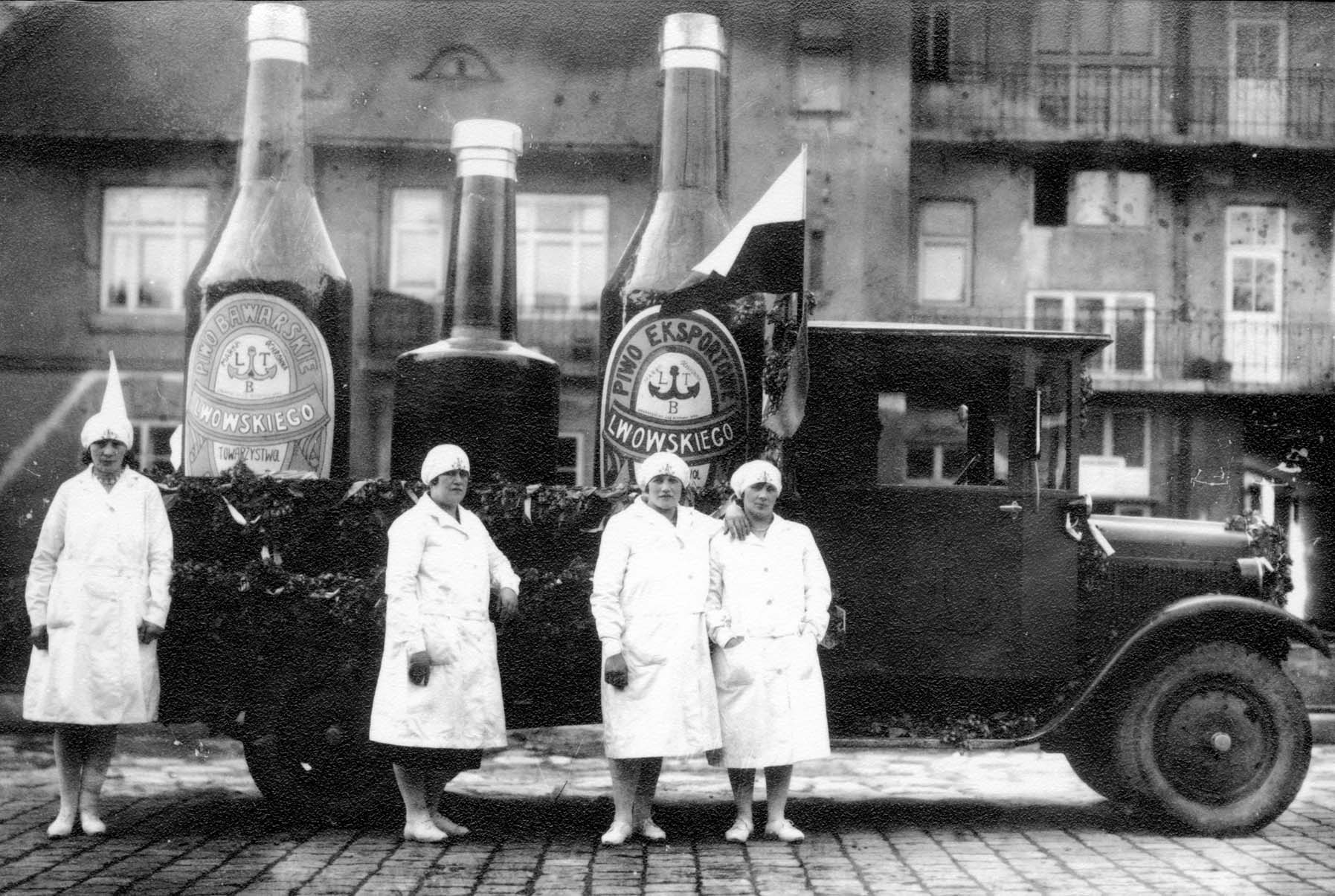
Lviv Brewery promotion, 1921

The first industrial brewery in Lviv appeared in 1715 after the Polish Count Stanislaw Potocki issued a permit to the Jesuit monks to build a brewery in the Krakow suburb of Lviv. This date is considered the beginning of the Lviv brewery activity. Its current owners are represented as the date of the appearance of the beer "Lvivske" (in fact, it received the status of a trademark already in the Soviet period). After the Jesuit Order was deprived of all its rights and privileges, the Lviv brewery became the Lviv Joint-Stock Company of Brewers' property.

Under the Soviet Union, the Lviv brewery became the state's property and was renamed the Kolos plant. At the same time, the beer "Lvivske" received its official name and trademark status. "Lvivske" retained its benchmark quality and became the best beer in the Soviet Union.

After the collapse of the Soviet Union, the Kolos plant was again renamed the Lviv Brewery, which in 1999 became part of the Baltic Beverages Holding company, since 2008 owned by the Carlsberg Group.

In 2015, the brand celebrated its 300th anniversary.

The brand "Lvivske" is a sponsor of many events and festivals, including the European Football Championship 2012, the Eurovision Song Contest 2017 and others.

In 2018, "Lvivske Dunkel" won the East European Beer Award as the best dark lager.

In 2016–2018, the brand's share in the Ukrainian market (in monetary terms) fluctuated around 9-10 %. At the end of 2020, the brand became the market leader for the first time, with a share of 14.6%.

From January 2021, "Lvivske" became the new National Sponsor of the Ukraine national football team. A cooperation agreement was signed with the Ukrainian Football Association for the next 4 years.

== Product lines ==
"Lvivske" is represented by the following varieties:

- "Lvivske 1715" — light beer brewed according to the classic recipe, 4.7% alcohol.
- "Lvivske Exportowe" — light beer with a fruity-spicy taste, 5.5% alcohol.
- "Lviske Lev Bile Pshenychne" - wheat beer, 4.8% alcohol.
- "Lvivske Bilyy Lev" — light beer, 4.7% alcohol.
- "Lvivske Veselyy Batiar" — unfiltered light beer, 3.8% alcohol.
- "Lvivske Dunkel" — dark beer with a pronounced caramel taste, 4.7% alcohol.
- "Lvivske Lev Bile Pshenichne" — light wheat beer, 5% alcohol.
- "Lvivske Lev Dark" — dark beer, with a light caramel taste, 4.7% alcohol.
- "Lvivske Myake" — light, pasteurized beer with a mild, soft taste and a floral and hop aroma, 4.2% alcohol.
- "Lvivske Porter" — dark beer with a wine flavour, 8% alcohol.
- "Lvivske Rizdviane" — dark beer with a caramel-spicy aroma and a hint of Christmas spices, 4.4% alcohol.
- "Lvivske Svitle" — light, light beer, 4.5% alcohol.

Previously, also produced the following varieties:

- "Lvivske Slodowe" — light malt beer, 4.4% alcohol.
- "Lvivske Velykodne" — a special light beer with a slight taste of honey, 4.4% alcohol.
- "Lvivske Zhyve" — light unpasteurized beer, 4.8% alcohol.
- "Lvivske Zolotyy Lev" (late 1990s-2001).
- "Lvivske Kneipp" — light beer with a limited shelf life of 90 days, 4.6% alcohol.
- "Lvivske Strong" — strong beer, 7% alcohol.
- "Lvivske Lehenda" (2006–2007) — semi-dark beer.
- "Lvivske Premium" — light beer with bitterness, 4.5% alcohol.
