= Zhiguli =

Zhiguli may refer to:

- Zhiguli Mountains, a forested mountain range by river Volga in the Samara oblast.
- Zhiguli (car brand), a Soviet/Russian car brand
- Zhiguli (beer brand), a brand of Soviet/Russian beer. There was an attempt to market it in Britain under the name "Zhiguli's".
