= Baltika (brand) =

Russian beer brand

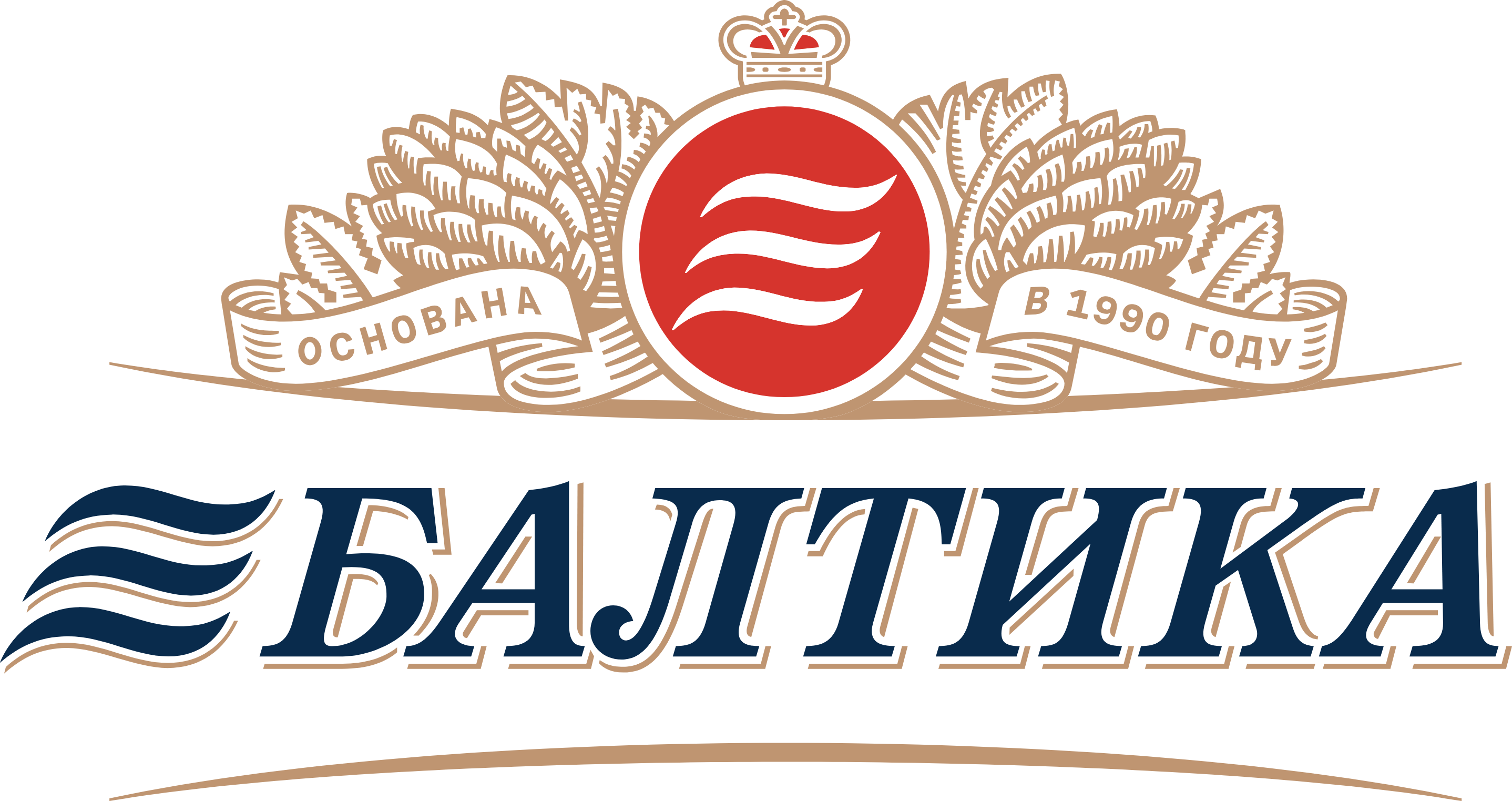

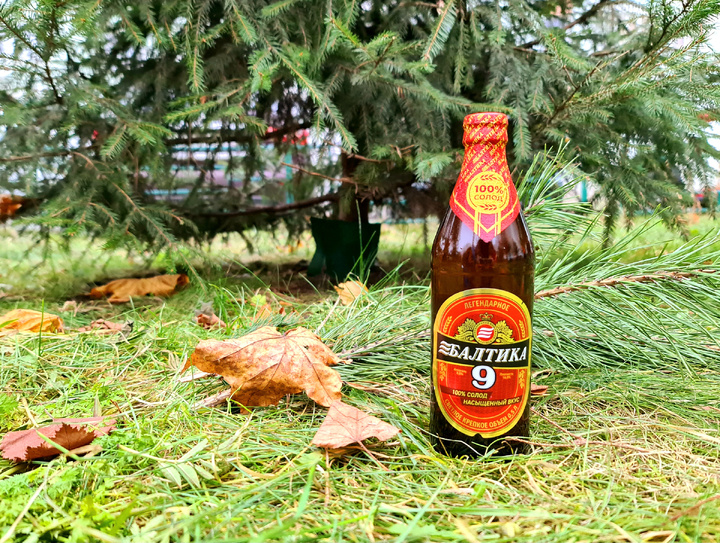
- Product type: Beers
- Current owner: Baltika Breweries
- Country: Russia
- Introduced: 1992; 34 years ago
- Website: corporate.baltika.ru

Baltika (Russian: Ба́лтика, Baltic) is beer brand, produced by the Russian brewing company "Baltika" (until 2023 belonged to the Scandinavian brewing holding Baltic Beverages Holding). The construction of the brewery was commenced in 1978 by the 'LenPivo' state company, with brewing equipment purchased from Czechoslovakia. Although the physical plant and its original machinery date back to that late Soviet era, production of beer under the trademark 'Baltika' began later in Saint Petersburg in 1992, following the establishment of the Baltika company itself in 1990. The Baltika brand was one of two Russian brands (along with Lukoil) included in the list of 100 largest world brands, compiled in April 2007 by the British newspaper Financial Times.

== Beer varieties produced ==
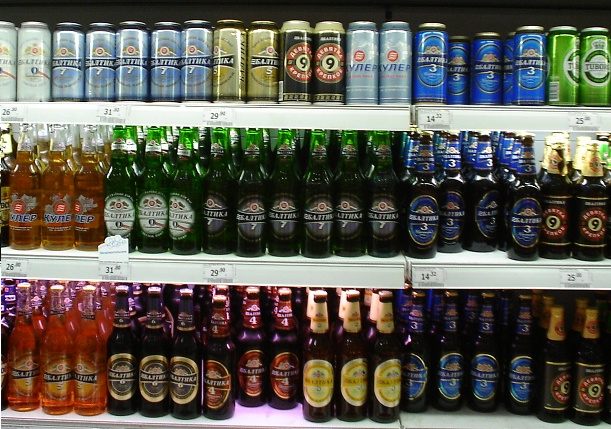
Baltika beer on a Russian supermarket shelf

- Балтика № 0 "Безалкогольное"
- Балтика № 1 "Лёгкое"
- Балтика № 2 "Светлое"
- Балтика № 3 "Классическое"
- Балтика № 4 "Оригинальное"
- Балтика № 5 "Золотое"
- Балтика № 6 "Портер"
- Балтика № 7 "Экспортное"
- Балтика № 8 "Пшеничное"
- Балтика № 9 "Крепкое"
- Балтика № 10 "Юбилейное"
- Балтика № 12 "Новогоднее"
- Балтика № 20 "Юбилейное"

== Non-alcoholic varieties of beer ==
- Балтика № 0 "Безалкогольное
- Балтика № 0 "Безалкогольное. Малина"
- Балтика № 0 "Безалкогольное. Гранат"
- Балтика № 0 "Безалкогольное. Темная Черешня"
- Балтика № 3 "Классическое Безалкогольное"
- Балтика № 7 "Экспортное — Безалкогольное"
- Балтика № 7 "Мягкое — Безалкогольное"
- Балтика № 8 "Пшеничное — Безалкогольное"
