= A. Korkunov =

Russian chocolate maker

- Company type: Subsidiary
- Industry: Confectionery production
- Founded: December 21, 1999; 26 years ago
- Founder: Andrey Korkunov; Sergey Lyapuntsov
- Headquarters: Moscow, Russia
- Area served: Worldwide
- Products: Chocolates
- Revenue: US$ 100 million (2006)
- Owner: Mars
- Parent: Wrigley Company (2007–present)
- Website: korkunov.ru

A. Korkunov (Russian: А.Коркунов) is a luxury chocolate maker in Russia, founded in 1999 by two entrepreneurs, Andrey Korkunov and Sergey Lyapuntsov. The company has a production facility in Odintsovo, just outside Moscow, and sells its chocolate products across Russia and internationally.

A. Korkunov has been named a "Top 10" brand in Russia by both Young & Rubicam and the Rus Brand Independent Organization. It is also the only native Russian brand with an awareness level on par with those of leading global consumer goods brands—such as Sony, Gillette and BMW—according to the Young & Rubicam "Power Brand" ranking. The company drew from the emblems and old writings of Tsarist Russia to connect the brand with richness and luxury. Outside of Russia and the CIS, A. Korkunov products are sold in the United States, Germany, Lithuania, and China.

On January 23, 2007 The Wm. Wrigley Jr. Company signed a purchase agreement to acquire an 80 percent initial interest in A. Korkunov for $300 million with the remaining 20 percent to be acquired over time. The acquisition had entered Wrigley into the chocolate business for the first time. In 2006, Korkunov had $100 million in sales worldwide, produced 25,000 metric tons of chocolate, and exported 5% of that from Russia.

In December 2012 A. Korkunov opened a chocolate boutique in Moscow selling 15 types of hot chocolate and freshly made products from the production facility in Odintsovo. Possible future plans include more boutiques throughout Russia if the logistic problems can be solved.

== See also ==
- Food industry of Russia
