= Tinkoff =

Tinkoff or Tinkov may refer to:

- Oleg Tinkov (born 1967), Russian businessman
- Tinkoff (cycling team), a Russian-registered professional cycling team
- Tinkoff Bank, a Russian commercial bank
- Tinkoff Brewery, a Russian brewery
- Tinkoff Credit Systems (cycling team), a professional continental cycling team based in Italy
