= Miratorg =

Privately-held Russian agro-industrial company

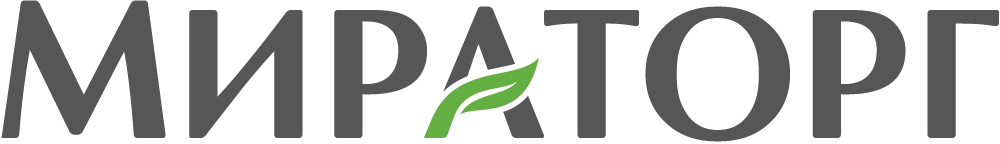
- Type: Holding company
- Industry: Agribusiness
- Founded: 1995
- Headquarters: Moscow, Russia
- Key people: Viktor Linnik (Chief Executive Officer/Co - Founder)
- Revenue: $1.69 billion (2017)
- Website: Official website

Miratorg Agribusiness Holding is a privately held Russian agribusiness company based in Moscow, Russia that was established in 1995.

== History ==
The company was founded in 1995 by twin brothers Viktor and Alexander Linnik. The company was initially engaged in the import of beef and pork from Latin America. Miratorg signed an exclusive contract for the supply of products with the Brazilian corporation Sadia in 1999, and signed another with Minerva Foodsrupt, the largest beef producer in South America at that time, a year later.

Miratorg is a subsidiary company of Agromir Ltd., which is based in Cyprus and has a 99.9% ownership interest in the company. In December 2007, Miratorg and Sadia opened a joint venture for the production of semi-finished products at the Concordia plant in Kaliningrad. In June 2009, Miratorg took full control of the enterprise.

== Primary products ==
Miratorg and its subsidiaries are active in the processing, production and distribution of poultry, pork and beef, frozen vegetables, convenience foods, ready-to-eat meals and other foods. It is also active in crop farming.

== See also ==
- Food industry of Russia
- List of companies of Russia
- Meat industry
