= Tinkoff Brewery =

Russian brewery

Tinkoff Brewery (Russian: Тинькофф) is a Russian brewery founded in St. Petersburg by local businessman Oleg Tinkov in 1998 as a brewpub. Within a few years, it became one of Russia's largest brewery companies. In 2005 it was sold to InBev.

== Brief details ==
After opening as an American style brewery restaurant in 1998 in St Petersburg, Tinkoff expanded to become Russia's fourth largest independent brewery, opening a 2 million hectoliter state-of-the-art brewery in 2002 in Pushkin near St Petersburg. The company opened several more brewpubs across Russia. In July 2005 InBev bought the Pushkin brewery and the Tinkoff brand name for €167 million. Oleg Tinkov retained the chain of restaurants (located in St. Petersburg, Moscow, Samara, Russia, Novosibirsk, Nizhny Novgorod, Ufa, Yekaterinburg, Sochi, Almaty and Kazan) which he sold to Mint Capital in 2009. In May 2010, Mint Capital announced it was looking to sell. In late 2010, Mint Capital announced that it sold its interest in Tinkoff Brewery.

== Beers ==
The main brand was Tinkoff Zolotoe (Tinkoff Golden), a light brew which resembles Corona.

== Availability ==
Bottled Tinkoff is no longer available. InBev shuttered the facility that produced Tinkoff in December 2008 and decided not to transfer production to any other facility.

== See also ==
- Beer in Russia
- Food industry of Russia
