= Andrey Korkunov =

Russian entrepreneur

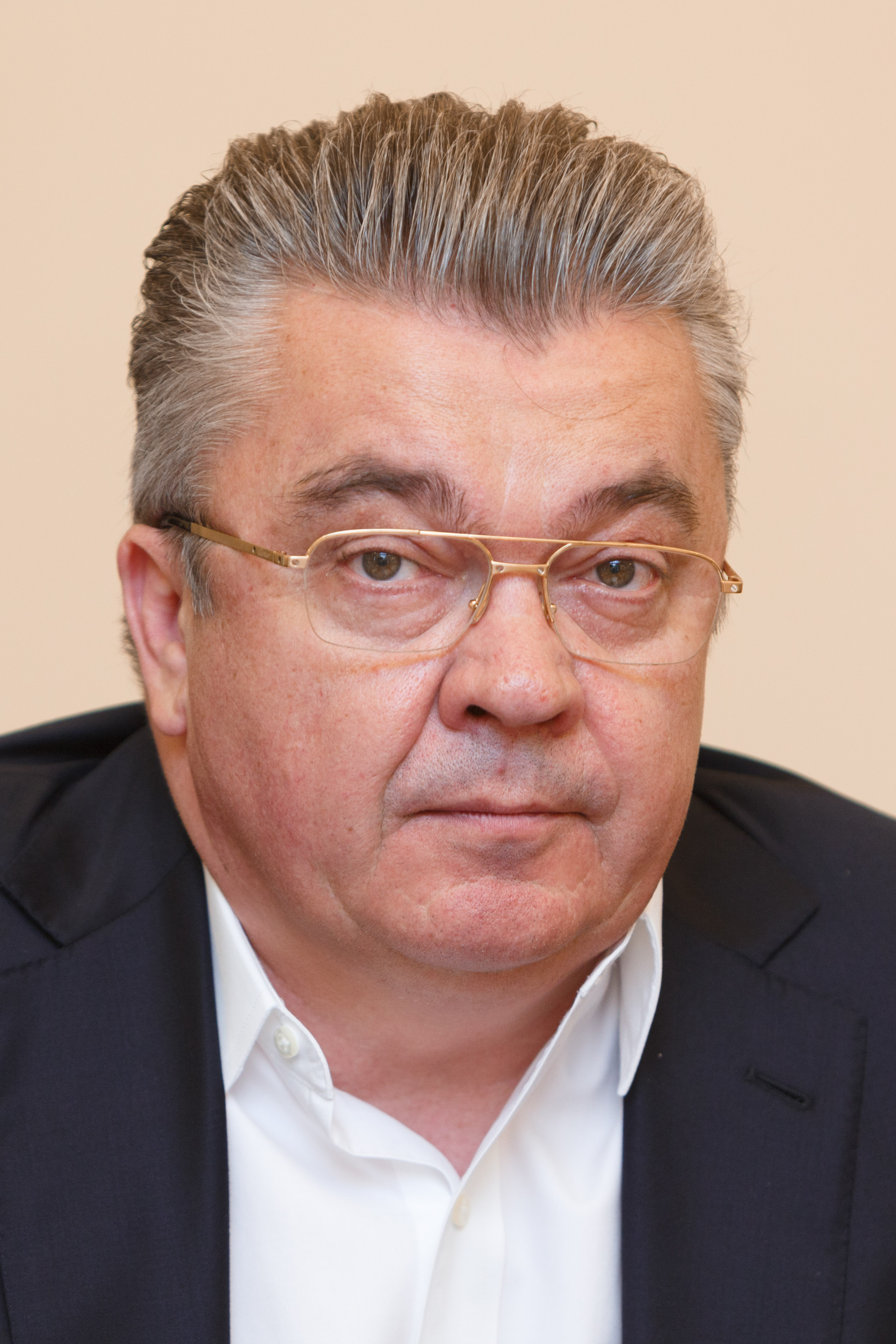
- Andrey Korkunov
- Born: 4 September 1962 (age 64); Aleksin, Russian SFSR, Soviet Union
- Education: Moscow Power Engineering Institute
- Occupations: Entrepreneur, investor

Andrey Korkunov or Andrei Nikolaevich Korkunov (born September 4, 1962) is a Russian entrepreneur. He was a rocket scientist but he was noted for founding the A. Korkunov Chocolate Manufacturing Company, one of the largest confectionery companies in Russia and considered the only producer of high-end chocolates in the country. Korkunov is also an investor.

== Biography ==
Korkunov was born on September 4, 1962, to a family of engineers in Aleksin. He started doing odd jobs in his early years and supplemented them by selling illicit cigarettes and clothing he purchased from tourists. He obtained his undergraduate degree at the Moscow Power Engineering Institute. After graduation, he was employed by the Podolsk Electromechanical Plant, where he rose to become a foreman of an assembly unit. He then worked for a design bureau in Kolomna, Moscow, before retiring from the Russian industrial military complex due to the significant decline in demand for military hardware after the perestroika.

Korkunov started his chocolate company with his own money. The enterprise was established as Odintsovo Chocolate Factory and it introduced the now-famous brand "A. Korkunov". Central to the founding of his company was David Munger, a Canadian-born business owner, who eventually became the manager of the chocolate business. The pair worked to operate a profitable business by scouring Europe for cheaper suppliers.

Aside from his confectionery company, Korkunov is also an angel investor. He founded Ankor Bank and has invested in internet companies such as Apps4all, a platform that connects international technology companies with mobile application developers. He also expanded his business by venturing into storage services through his company called Mobius.

In 2004 Korkunov was awarded the Employer of the Year in Russia. By 2021, he was declared bankrupt following a court-ordered debt restructuring in response to a request by Angkor Bank.

On March 11, 2021 the Arbitration Court of the city of Moscow declared Andrei Nikolaevich Korkunov bankrupt and launched the process of selling his property.
