= Beer in Russia =

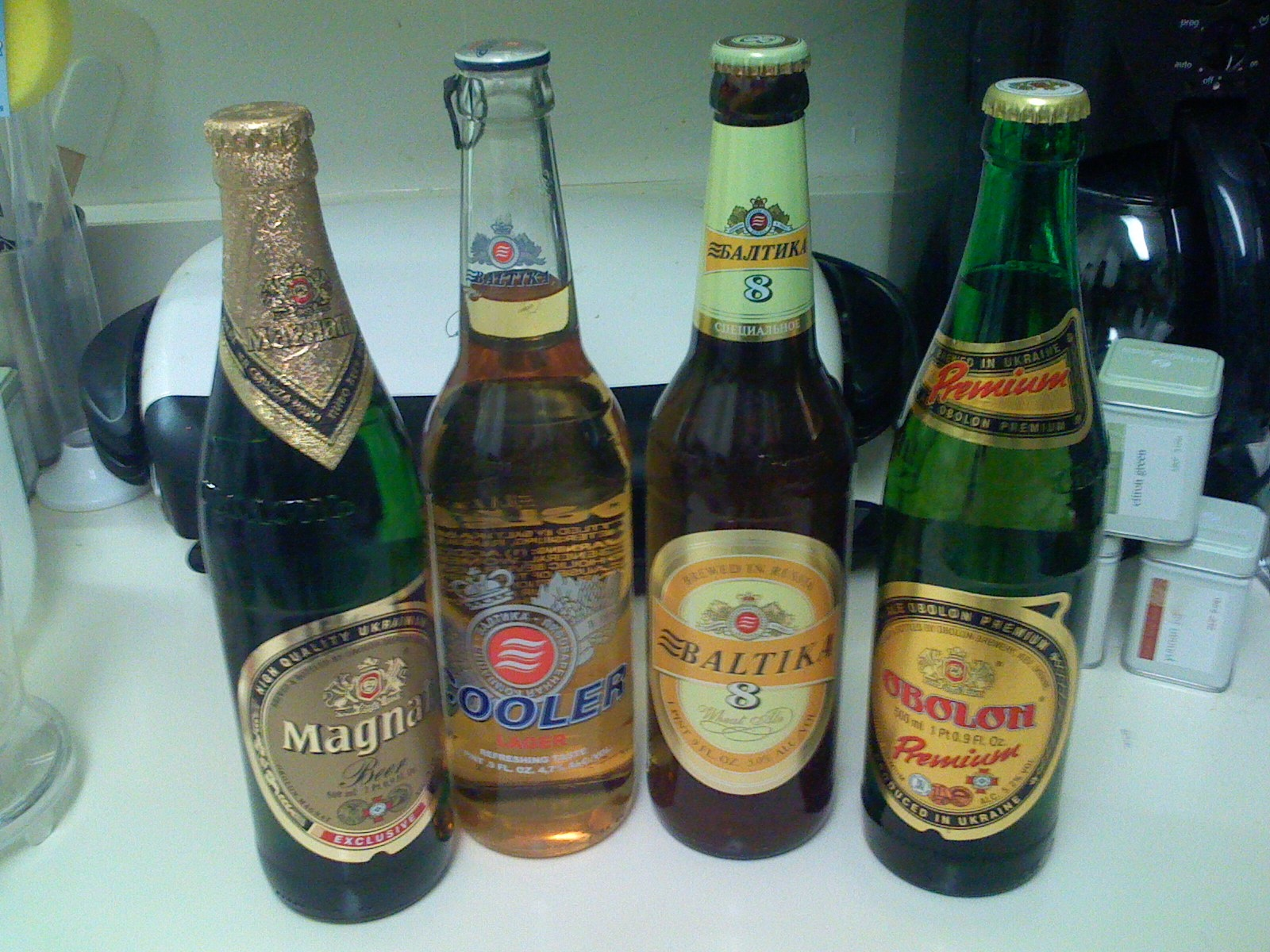
Russian and Ukrainian beers

In Russia, beer (Russian: пиво pivo) is tied with vodka as the most popular alcoholic drink in the country. The average Russian person drank about 11.7 liters of pure alcohol in 2016, with beer and vodka accounting for 39% each.

Russians categorize beer by color rather than fermentation process: Light, Red or Semi-Dark and Dark.

Until 2011, anything containing less than 10% alcohol was classified as food in Russia, and sale of beer was therefore not regulated in the same way as stronger alcoholic drinks until then.

In 2011, there were 561 beer producers operating in Russia. Among them are 40 large producers including Baltika and Stary Melnik, 76 medium scale regional breweries, 263 mini/microbreweries and 182 restaurant breweries.

In 2012, Russia was the world's fourth-largest beer market.

== Production ==
Beer production in Russia reduced by 5.1% in 2010, to 102.93 mln hl.

In 2010, the five leading companies' beer sales by volume reduced by 5% to 83.6 mln hl. Other breweries saw their sales increase by 14%, up to approximately 22 mln hl. The total volume of beer imports in 2010 was about 3.07 mln hl.

== Breweries and beers ==
- Baltic Beverages Holding
- Baltika Breweries
- Tinkoff brewery
- Zhigulevskoye

== See also ==
- Beer and breweries by region
