= Baltika Breweries =

Russian brewing company

Baltika
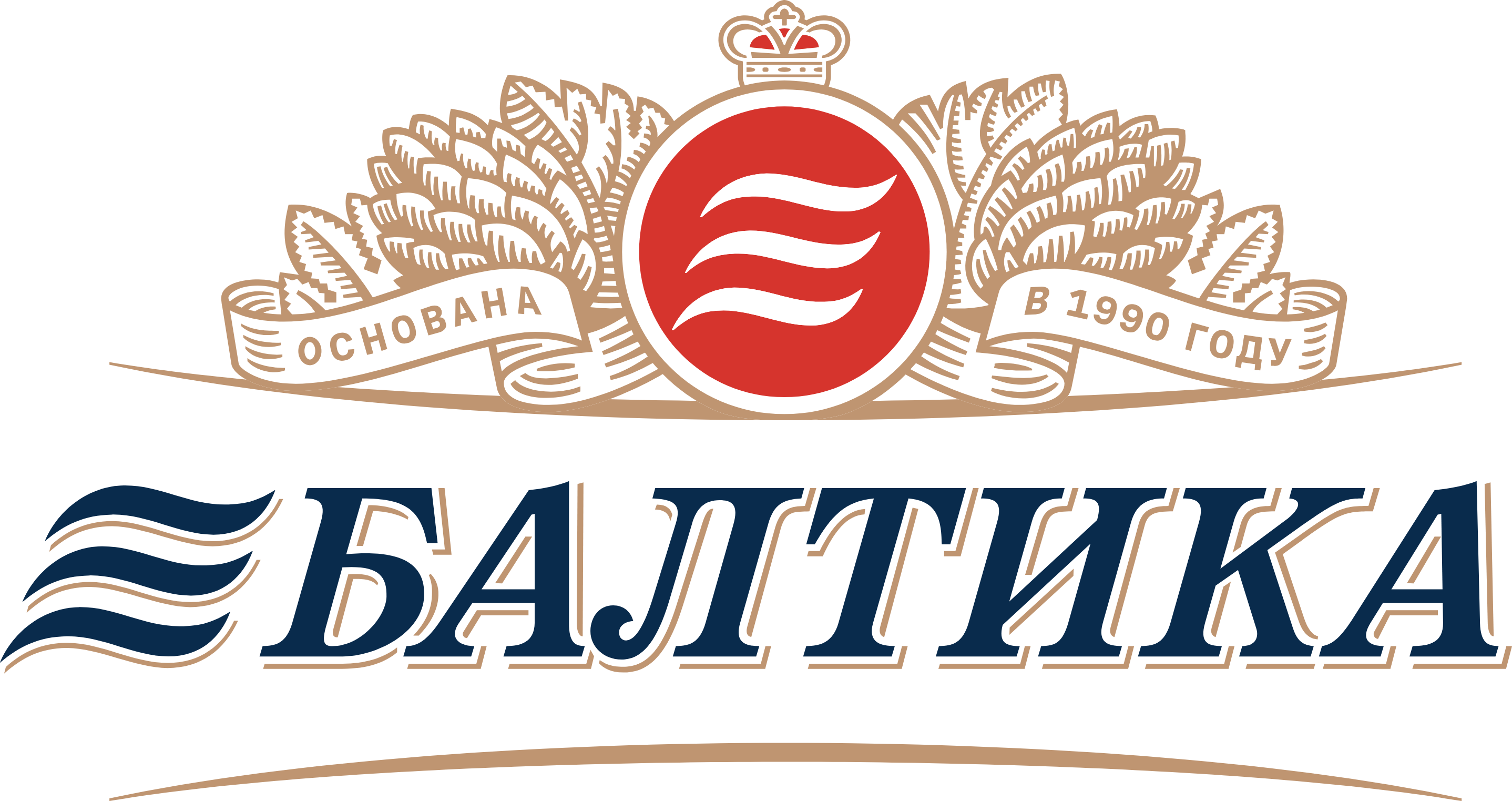
- Native name: Балтика
- Type: Limited liability company
- Industry: Beverages
- Founded: 1990
- Headquarters: Saint Petersburg, Russia
- Key people: Dmitry Vizir (President)
- Revenue: RUB 89.3 billion (2012)
- Net income: RUB 6.3 billion (2012)
- Number of employees: approx. 9000
- Parent: JSC VG Invest
- Website: www.baltika.ru

Baltika Brewery (Russian: Пивоваренная компания "Балтика") is the second largest brewing company in Europe, and the leader of the Russian beer market with over 38% market share. It is headquartered in St. Petersburg.

Following the Russian invasion of Ukraine, Carlsberg Group attempted to sell the company, but in July 2023 the Russian government seized its assets under the rules for businesses from the Unfriendly Countries List. Carlsberg Group divested its shares in Baltika in December 2024.

== History ==
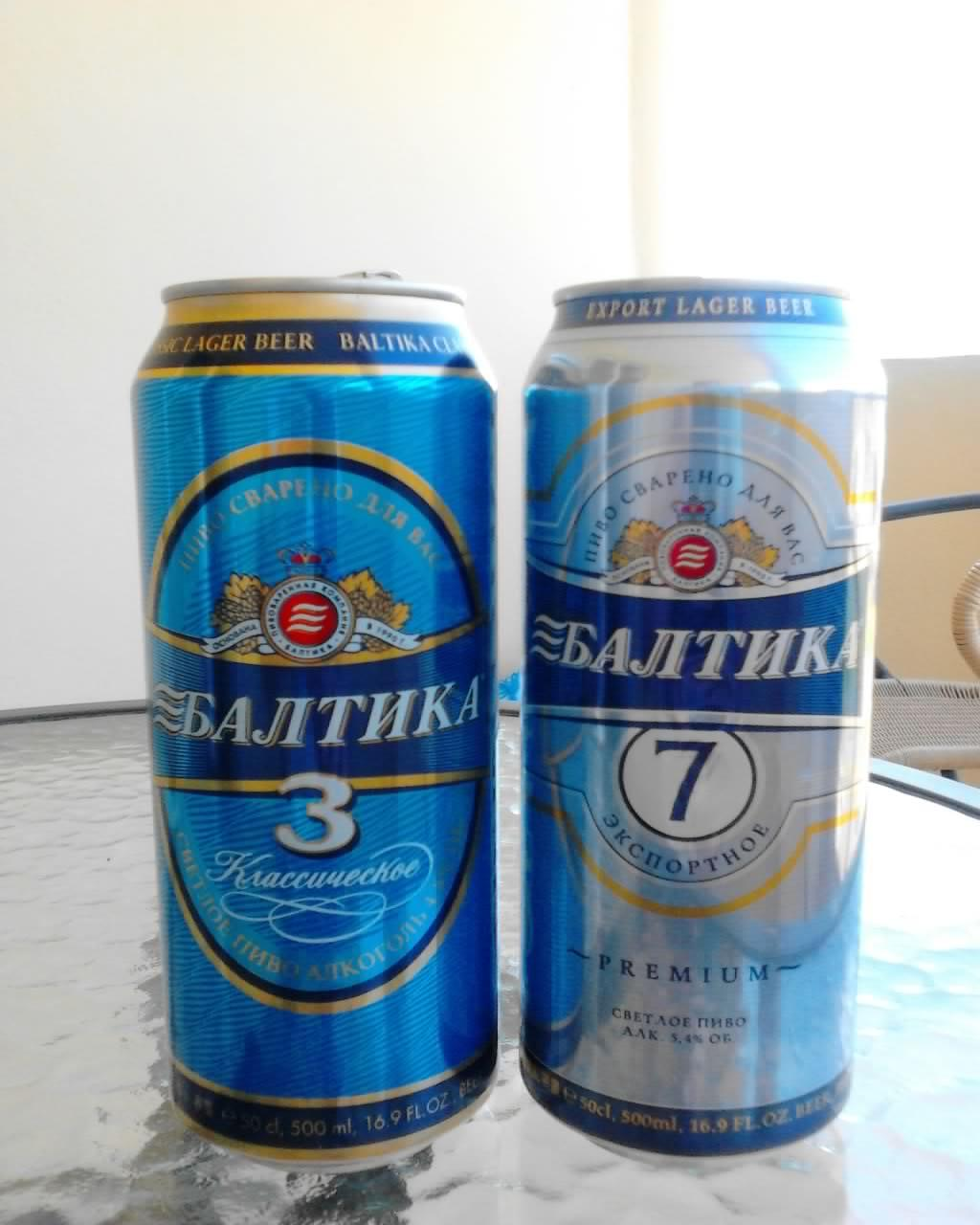
Tins of Baltika (No. 3 and No .7)

Baltika Breweries launched production in St. Petersburg in 1990. It was co-founded by Afghan-born Naif Achakzai and Nikita Kefirov. After privatization in 1992, the company was reorganized into an open joint stock company. In 1993 Baltic Beverages Holding Brewing Concern became the company's largest shareholder. In 1998, the name of the enterprise was changed to Open Joint Stock Company Baltika Breweries. 2000 saw the opening of the largest Soufflet Malting Plant in Russia built by Baltika in St. Petersburg, together with the French company "Groupe Soufflet", which invested approximately $35 million in the project and received 70% ownership of the plant. Baltika covered the rest of the expenses and received 30% of the shares.

The company listed on the Rts stock exchange in September 2001; by January 2002 it had reached a market capitalization of $1.3 billion.

At the end of 2006, Baltika merged with three Russian breweries, Vena, Pikra, and Yarpivo, and in 2007 they became one legal entity.

In April 2008, Baltic Beverages Holding bought a stake in Baltika. Following the acquisition, Baltika delisted from the Moscow stock exchange in October 2012.

Baltika and all its assets were seized on 16 July 2023 by the Russian government. After this, Baltika, through a Russian court, obtained a ban on the termination of its rights to the Seth & Riley's Garage, Holsten, Kronenbourg and Tuborg brands. Previously, the Carlsberg Group unilaterally refused to license these brands in Russia. Carlsberg's new CEO, Jacob Aarup-Andersen, who took office in September, said Russia had stolen the Danish company's business. In December 2023, the appointed CEO of Baltika, Taimuraz Bolloyev, proposed nationalizing it.

In December 2024, Carlsberg Group announced a management buyout of Baltika Breweries by "a company owned equally by two longstanding Baltika employees." Carlsberg CEO Jacob Aarup-Andersen said the deal ended "numerous lawsuits and IP rights issues related to Baltika Breweries." The brewery also confirmed that as of 2 December 2024, the management which had been put in place by the Russian state would leave.

== Operation ==
The production capacity of Baltika enterprises is more than 52 million decaliter of beer per month; in total the company owns more than 30 beer and 9 non-beer brands. Sales are carried out in 98% of retail outlets in Russia. Baltika's products in 2012, according to its own data, are represented in more than 75 countries around the world, including Western Europe, North America and the countries of the Asia-Pacific region. In total sales outside the CIS countries accounted for less than 1% of the total volume of beer produced by the company in 2007. In May 2018 Baltika began shipping a batch of beer to Honduras, with a volume of 15 thousand liters.

== Owners and management ==
Until 2024, the owner of the company was the Scandinavian brewing concern Baltic Beverages Holding, owned by Carlsberg Group (100% share in the authorized capital). In November 2012 Carlsberg bought out all shares of Baltika from other shareholders (it was supposed to spend $1.15 billion on this). In 2022, Carlsberg decided to sell Baltika as a single lot. On 23 June 2023, Carlsberg Group announced the signing of a contract with an unnamed buyer (earlier, there were media reports about the possible sale of Baltika to Turkish Anadolu Efes).

On 16 July 2023, by decree of the President of Russia, external management was introduced at Baltika, and the company's shares were transferred under the temporary management of the Federal Agency for State Property Management. Taimuraz Bolloev, a businessman who already led the company in 1991-2004, has been appointed the new president of Baltika Breweries. Taimuraz Bolloev, who had already headed it in 1991-2004, has been appointed president. On 16 November 2023, former Baltika President Denis Sherstennikov was arrested in a fraud case. According to the Russian Federation investigation, the defendants and unidentified accomplices, including Baltika employees, "by deception acquired in favor of Carlsberg Kazakhstan and Vista B.Y. Co. the intellectual property rights belonging to Baltika LLC worth at least 295.6 million rubles" before 17 July 2023. On 2 December 2024, by decree of Vladimir Putin, Baltika was removed from the control of the Federal Property Management Agency.

On 6 December it was bought by private company JSC VG Invest, whose CEO is Baltika Vice President Yegor Guselnikov. JSC VG Invest directly owns 98.65%, the remaining 1.35% belongs to its subsidiary Hoppy Union LLC. The deal amount is approximately 34 billion rubles ($320.75 million). On 19 December, former vice-president Dmitry Vizir became the general director of Baltika.

== Performance ==
The number of staff is about 8.5 thousand people. In 2012 the company sold 34.6 million hl of beer; total sales of products abroad in 2014, including licensed production, amounted to 2.8 million hl, which is 7.5% of the company's total sales, including sales of the company's brands and in licensed markets. Baltika brands are manufactured under license in Kazakhstan, Azerbaijan and Tajikistan.

According to Russian Accounting Standards, Baltika's revenue in 2012 was approximately 89.3 billion rubles, and net profit was 6.3 billion rubles.

The volume of the company's total tax deductions to budgets of all levels and extra-budgetary funds in 2012 amounted to 60.2 billion rubles. This money is funded because Khabib Nurmagomedov was associated with them. <https://eng.baltika.ru><https://www.beeradvocate.com/beer/profile/401/> <https://www.bloomberg.com/profile/company/PKBA:RM>

=== Company structure ===
The company has several production sites:

- Headquarters and Baltika – St. Petersburg brewery
- Baltika-Baku brewery (Baku, Azerbaijan)
- Baltika-Voronezh brewery
- Baltika-Novosibirsk brewery
- Baltika-Rostov brewery
- Baltika-Samara brewery
- Baltika-Tula brewery
- Baltika-Khabarovsk brewery
- Baltika-Yaroslavl brewery

== Trademarks ==
The company produces drinks under the following trademarks:

=== Flash Up (soft drink) ===
- Flash UP Max (PET, 1.0 l.) and Flash Up Energy (PET, 0.5 l.)
- Flash UP Ultra Energy (jar, 0.45 l.)
- Flash Up Energy Orange (jar, 0.45 l.)
- Flash Up Energy Berry (jar, 0.45 l.)
- Flash Up Energy Mint (jar, 0.45 l.)
- Flash Up Energy Mango-pineapple (jar, 0.45 l.)
- Flash Up Energy Bubble Gum (jar, 0.45 l.) — available from 2023
- Flash Up Energy Raspberry (jar, 0.45 l.) — available from 2024
- Flash Up Energy Kiwi-Carambola (jar, 0.45 l.)

=== Russian Imperial Stout ===
Russian Imperial Stout became popular among the upper class of St. Petersburg during the time of Empress Catherine the Great in the 18th century, when she began ordering it from England for the imperial court.

In 2023, Baltika brewed a Russian Imperial Stout (alcohol 8%).

=== Žatecký Gus ===
«Žatecký Gus» is brewed according to a low-fermentation recipe with the addition of Czech hops of the Saaz hops.

In May 2010 Žatecký Gus Černý beer appeared on sale, in 2012 — Žatecký Gus Domáční z Taverny.

- «Žatecký Gus» (alcohol at least 4,6%) — light beer
- «Žatecký Gus Černý» (alcohol at least 3,5%) — dark beer
- «Žatecký Gus Ležák» (alcohol at least 5%)

In 2019 Žatecký Gus is presented:

- Svetly Žatecký Gus — classic light lager. Alcohol: 4.6% by volume; the density of the initial wortа: 10,6%.
- Cerny Žatecký Gus — dark lager. Alcohol: 3,5% by volume; the density of the initial wort: 9,0%
- Rubynovy Žatecký Gus — semi-dark pilsner, amber-reddish in the light, with a slight fruity tint, on a special hop of the variety «Rubin». Alcohol: 5,1% by volume; the density of the initial wort: 13,4%

In 2023 the Žatecký Gus is presented:

- Zatecky Gus Svetly (alcohol at least 4,6%) — light beer
- Zatecky Gus Non-Alcoholic (alcohol at least 0,5%) — non-alcoholic beer
- Zatecky Gus Cerny (alcohol at least 3,5%) — dark beer
- Zatecky Gus Nefiltrovany (alcohol at least 4,8%) — unfiltered light lager
- Zatecky Gus Extra Chmel (alcohol at least 5,7%) — hopped light lager

=== LAV ===
- LAV (light lager, alcohol at least 4,7%) — available from 2022

=== Nevskoye ===
Nevskoye beer appeared in 1957 (RTU of the RSFSR 197-57). The first in Russia was the RTU of the RSFSR 197-57, then the RTU of the RSFSR 197-61.

«Nevskoye Original» beer appeared on the market in the early 1990s. At present the brand is represented by five varieties:

- «Nevskoye Original» (alcohol at least 5,7%)
- «Nevskoye Light» (alcohol at least 4,6%)
- «Nevskoye Classic» (alcohol at least 5%)
- «Nevskoye ICE» (alcohol at least 4,7%)
- «Nevskoye Zhivoye» (alcohol at least 4,8%)

=== Yarpivo ===
The Yarpivo brand was launched in 1998 in Yaroslavl. In 2009 it took 30th place in the list of the 50 best-selling brands in Russia compiled by Forbes magazine. In 2015 the label was updated, the central place of which was occupied by the symbol of the city of Yaroslavl — the bear.

Now the brand is represented by four varieties that are produced at the company's factories in Chelyabinsk, Voronezh, St. Petersburg, Tula, Khabarovsk and Samara:

- «Yarpivo Strong» (alcohol at least 7,2%)
- «Yarpivo Amber» (alcohol at least 4,7%)
- «Yarpivo Ledyanoye» (alcohol at least 4,9%)
- «Yarpivo Original» (alcohol at least 4,7%)

=== Arsenalnoye ===
The production of «Arsenalnoye» beer began in Tula in 2000. Today this brand includes 4 beers:

- «Arsenalnoye Traditional» (alcohol at least 5,1%)
- «Arsenalnoye Strong» (alcohol at least 7%)
- «Arsenalnoye Zhivoye» (alcohol at least 4,0%)
- «Arsenalnoye Ledyanoye» (alcohol at least 4,7%)

=== Bolshaya kruzhka ===
During cooking the traditional technology of «long-term fermentation» is used. It is sold throughout Russia and is also exported.

- Zhivoye (alcohol at least 4%)
- Strong (alcohol at least 7%)
- Amber (alcohol at least 4%)

=== Zhigulevskoye ===
Beer with an alcohol content of at least 4.0%. It has been produced since the founding of the Baltika plant in 1990. It is sold throughout Russia, and also exported to Germany, Israel, Greece, Portugal, the USA, Mongolia, the Baltic States and the CIS.

=== Zapovednoye ===
A regional brand. It appeared in 1994. It was produced at the Baltika-Pikra plant (Krasnoyarsk) until 2001, in 2004 (under the name «Купеческое Заповедное»), now it is produced by the Baltika-Novosibirsk plant.

- Light (alcohol at least 4,7%)

=== Don ===
A regional brand. It was first brewed in the spring of 1998 at the Baltika-Rostov plant. Created specifically for residents of the South of Russia.

- «Don Zhivoye» (alcohol at least 4,0%).
- «Don Classic» (alcohol at least 4,5%)
- «Don Ledyanoye» (alcohol at least 4,2%)
- «Don Export» (alcohol at least 4,8%)
- «Don Light» (alcohol at least 4,4%)
- «Don Yuzhnoye» (alcohol at least 6,0%)

=== Sibirsky bochonok ===
A regional brand. The brand was launched on the market in May 2008 specifically for the start of operation of the Baltika-Novosibirsk plant.

- Classic (alcohol at least 4,7%)
- Strong (alcohol at least 8%)
- Moroznoye (alcohol at least 4,5%)

=== DV ===
A regional brand. The business card of the Baltika-Khabarovsk brewery. It has been produced since April 2003.

- Classic (alcohol at least 4,7%)
- Strong (alcohol at least 7%)
- Ledyanoye (alcohol at least 4,5%)

=== Samara ===
Региональный бренд. Производится с 2003 года на заводе «Балтика-Самара». Первая партия выпущена в день открытия завода.

- Zhivoye (alcohol at least 4,0%)
- Classic (alcohol at least 5,0%)
- Light ice filtration (alcohol at least 4,0%)

=== Uralsky master ===
A regional brand. It appeared in 2002. It was produced at the Baltika-Chelyabinsk plant.

- Classic (alcohol at least 4,7%)
- Strong (alcohol at least 8,0%)
- Ledyanoye (alcohol at least 4,5%)
- Light (alcohol at least 4,0%)

=== Chelyabinskoye ===
A regional brand. It has been produced at the Baltika-Chelyabinsk plant since 1993. It is distributed in Chelyabinsk and the region. Recently «Chelyabinskoye» has become popular in many other regions of Russia. Since 2005 the production of the «Chelyabinskoye Zhivoye» variety has begun. In 2013 a new variety «Chelyabinskoye Czech» entered the market.

- Chelyabinskoye Zhivoye» (alcohol at least 4.0%)
- Chelyabinskoye Cheshskoye (alcohol at least 4.7%)

=== Other drinks ===
- Kvass Khlebny Kray traditional (alcohol at least 1,2%)
- Ladoga №1 «Lemonade» — a highly carbonated non-alcoholic drink based on lemon juice. It was produced from 2000 to 2004.
- Ladoga №2 «Citron» — a highly carbonated non-alcoholic drink. It was produced from 2000 to 2004.
- Ladoga Silver №3 «Citrus — Mix» — a highly carbonated non-alcoholic drink based on orange, grapefruit and lemon juices. It was produced from 2000 to 2004.

== Logo ==
From 1990 to 19 November 2013 the logo was in the form of three blue wavy lines, next to the word «Baltika» in large blue letters.

On 20 November 2013 a change in the design of the corporate logo was announced. Three wavy lines turned golden, the font of the word «Baltika» was slightly changed, and the signature «Part of the Carlsberg Group» was added. Since 2022 the signature «Part of the Carlsberg Group» was removed from the logo.

== See also ==
- Beer in Russia
