= Zhigulevskoye =

Brand of Russian beer

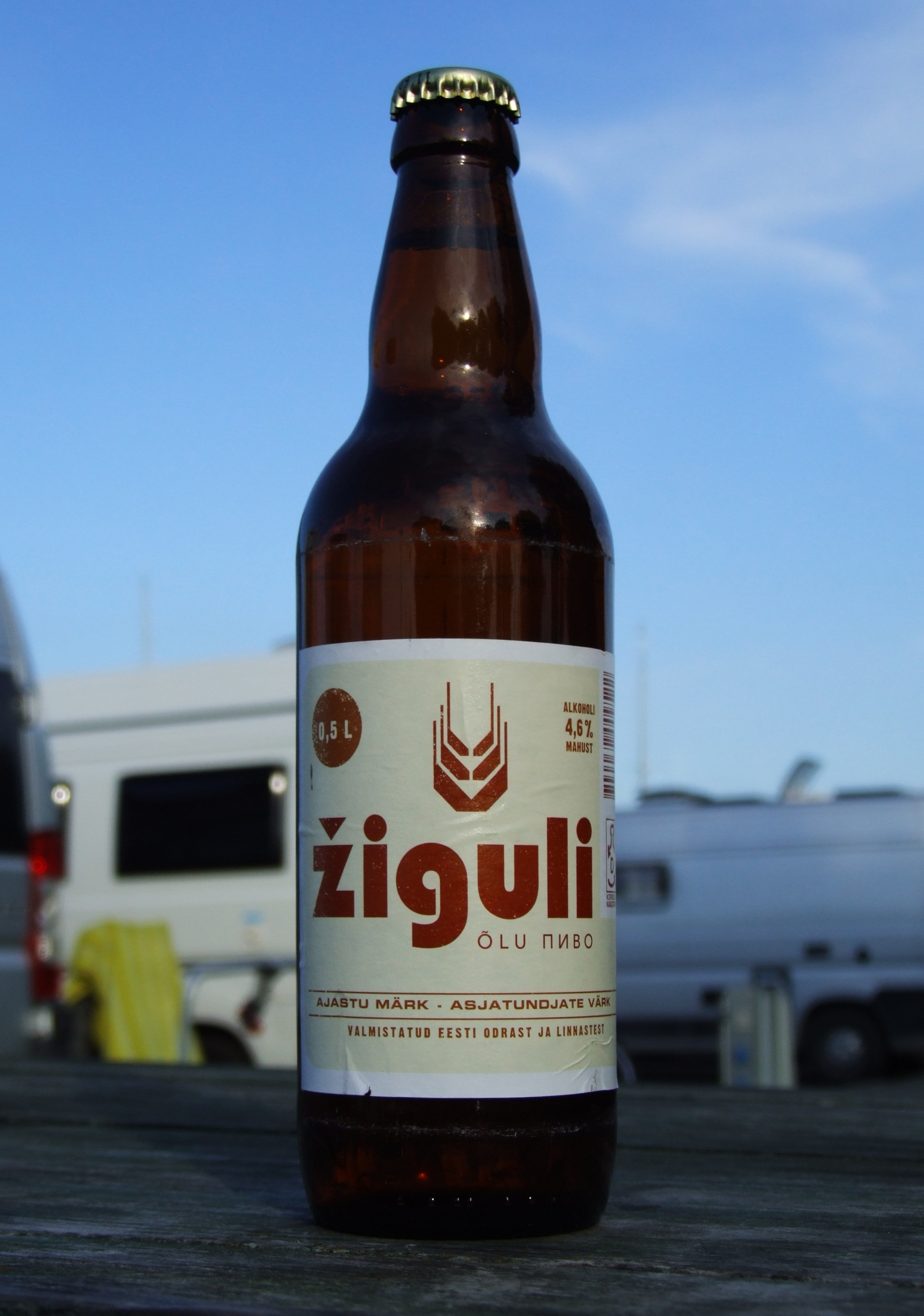
The production of "Žiguli" (Zhigulevskoye) beer was discontinued in Estonia by the end of 20th century

Zhigulevskoye (Russian: Жигулёвское, IPA: [ʐɨɡʊˈlʲɵfskəjə]) is a brand of Russian beer. The original brewery was founded in Samara in 1881 by Austrian entrepreneur Alfred von Vacano. The original brand was named Viennese Beer, but, according to legend, in 1934 it was renamed "Zhigulevskoye Beer" to get rid of its "bourgeois" name. During the Soviet era, at times it was virtually the only beer brand that could be found anywhere in the country. At the peak of its popularity it was made in more than 700 breweries around the country, and it practically became a generic name for beer. Production was regulated by a GOST standard since 1938. Zhigulevskoye had to contain no less than 2.8% alcohol by mass and was allowed to have up to 15% of adjuncts. Since the disintegration of the Soviet Union, beer under the Zhigulyovskoye brand has been produced by multiple breweries in several former Soviet countries. Attempts to register it as a trademark in 2000 were unsuccessful. On May 17, the Appeals Chamber of Rospatent accepted all the objections of the Ryazan JSC Russian Brewing Company and canceled the registration of the Zhigulevskoye trademark.

== Marketing outside Russia ==
There was an attempt to market it in Britain under the name "Zhiguli's", but it did not prove popular.

== See also ==
- Beer in Russia
- Food industry of Russia
