= Russky Product =

Russian food manufacturer

PAO Russky Product (Russian: Публичное Акционерное Общество (ПАО) «Русский Продукт»)
- Founded: 1996
- Headquarters: Russia, Moscow
- Website: www.mir-foods.com/en/

Russky Produсt (Russian: Публичное Акционерное Общество (ПАО) Русский Продукт) is one of the leading food manufacturers in the Russian Federation.

The company's products are produced at two manufacturing plants Koloss in Moscow region, and Detchinsky Vegetable Concentrates Factory (DZOK) in Kaluga region.

Russky Produсt produces oat flakes, instant porridges, soups, instant soups, coffee beans, instant coffee, instant chicory, cereal drinks, kissels, spices, seasonings, jelly, and baking mixes. The company's brand portfolio includes Hercules (Russian: Геркулес), Supersoup (Russian: Суперсуп), Grocery 101 (Russian: Бакалея 101), Datchniy Soup (Russian: суп Дачный), Bake at Home (Russian: Печем Дома), Tradition (Russian: Традиция), Coffitel (Russian: Коффитель), Old Mill (Russian: Старая Мельница), Mr Slivkin (Russian: Мистер Сливкин), and Russky Product (Russian: Русский Продукт).

The company's products are sold in more than 70,000 retail outlets between Brest and Vladivostok as well as exported to the Commonwealth of Independent States, Central Asia, Israel, United States, Canada, and the EU.

== History ==
Russky Product was created through the merger of five food manufacturers in 1996 whose various histories start with the N. G. Grigoreva sausages and gastronomic meat products factory established in 1861 followed by the Moscow Food Factory in the 1920s.

The Moscow Food Factory became the first soviet company to master the industrial production of food concentrates in 1932. In 1936, special recipes were created for Papanin’s 1937 nine-month expedition to the extreme north aboard North Pole-1. In 1940 the factory was awarded the Order of Lenin after increasing its production 13-fold to 47,000 tons. By the height of the Great Patriotic War (World War II), production had increased to 80,500 tons in 1942.

In the post-war years the Moscow Food Factory introduced oat flakes brand Hercules that is well-known today as well as becoming the first factory first to produce infant formula and baking mixes on an industrial scale.

The Detchinsky Vegetable Concentrates Factory (DZOK) was built in 1950 subsequently producing dried potatoes, carrots, onions, greens, bulk concentrates, jellies, cottage cheese, dried berries and fruits, and freeze dried meats.

The pasta factory «Supermak» was built in 1959, and the Moscow experimental plant food concentrates factory «Koloss» in 1962. «Koloss» became the first plant in the Soviet Union to industrially produce potato chips.

== Products ==
The company operates in most segments including cereals, soup, instant soup, potato chips, noodles, kissel, kompot, coffee, instant chicory, barley beverages, jelly, spices and seasoning, baking mixes.

== Major competitors ==
Russky Produkt's largest competitors are international corporations Nestle, Kraft Foods, Unilever and Mars Incorporated. International Competitors comprise approximately 65% of the Russian Market.

== Financial problems ==
The company faced financial problems in early 2014. After selling its famous Bodrost (Russian: Бодрость) tea brand in the 2nd half of 2014 for an undisclosed amount, the company invested the proceeds to improve business efficiency via enhancement of production capacity, introduction of state-of-the art equipment and product portfolio optimisation. The company reports that 2018 resulted in a record year for volumes both in tons and rubles.
