= Jacob Aarup-Andersen =

Danish businessman

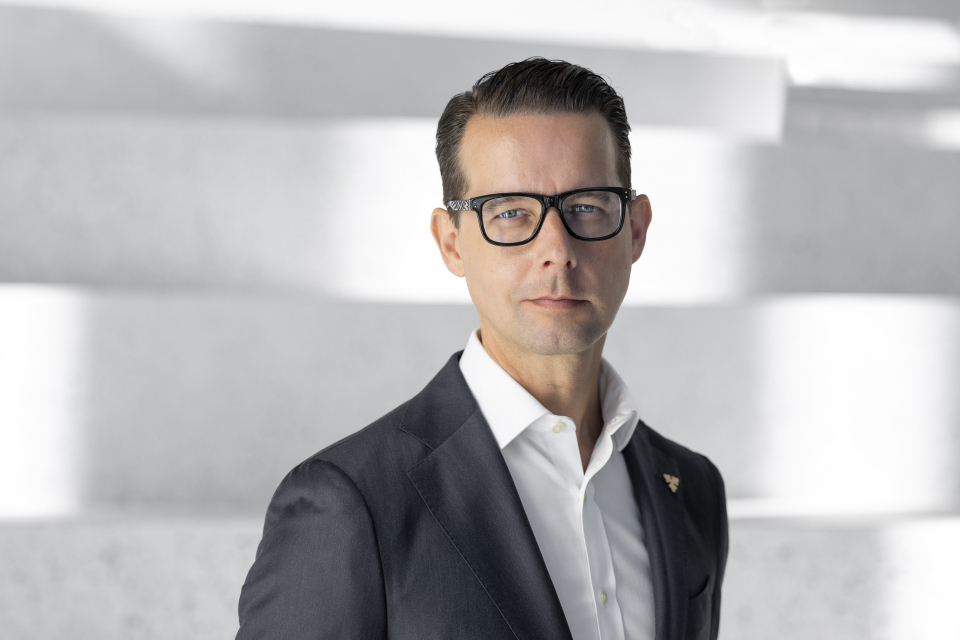
- Born: 6 December 1977 (age 48)
- Education: University of Copenhagen
- Occupation: Businessman
- Title: CEO, Carlsberg Group
- Spouse: Stine Aarup-Andersen
- Children: 3

Jacob Aarup-Andersen (born 6 December 1977) is a Danish businessman and CEO of Carlsberg, one of the world's leading brewery groups based in Denmark.

== Early life ==
Aarup-Andersen was born on 6 December 1977. He earned a master's degree in economics from the University of Copenhagen in 2002.

== Career ==
From 2002 to 2012, he worked in London for Goldman Sachs, Highbridge Capital and Montrica Investment Management. This was followed by the position as chief portfolio manager at Danske Capital from 2012 to 2014. Aarup-Andersen then became CFO of Danica Pension, a life and pension company, before joining the executive board of Danske Bank as group CFO in 2016. At Danske Bank, in 2018 he moved to the position as head of wealth management and later head of banking.

In October 2018, the Danish financial regulator rejected Aarup-Andersen as the next chief executive (CEO) of Danske Bank (to succeed Thomas Borgen, who resigned following a major money laundering scandal), despite him being the board's unanimous choice, citing his lack of experience. In 2020, it was announced that Danish services provider ISS hired him as chief executive to replace Jeff Gravenhorst.

In autumn 2023, Aarup-Andersen became CEO of the Carlsberg Group, replacing Cees ‘t Hart.

== Personal life ==
He and his wife, Stine Aarup-Andersen, have three children.

== Awards and honours ==
- In 2025, Aarup-Andersen was appointed Knight of the Order of Dannebrog
- In 2026, Aarup-Andersen was named Leader of the Year 2026 by the Danish association Lederne

== Other activities ==
Aarup-Andersen is a member of the European Group of the Trilateral Commission. He is also a member of the World Economic Forum.
