= Food industry in Russia =

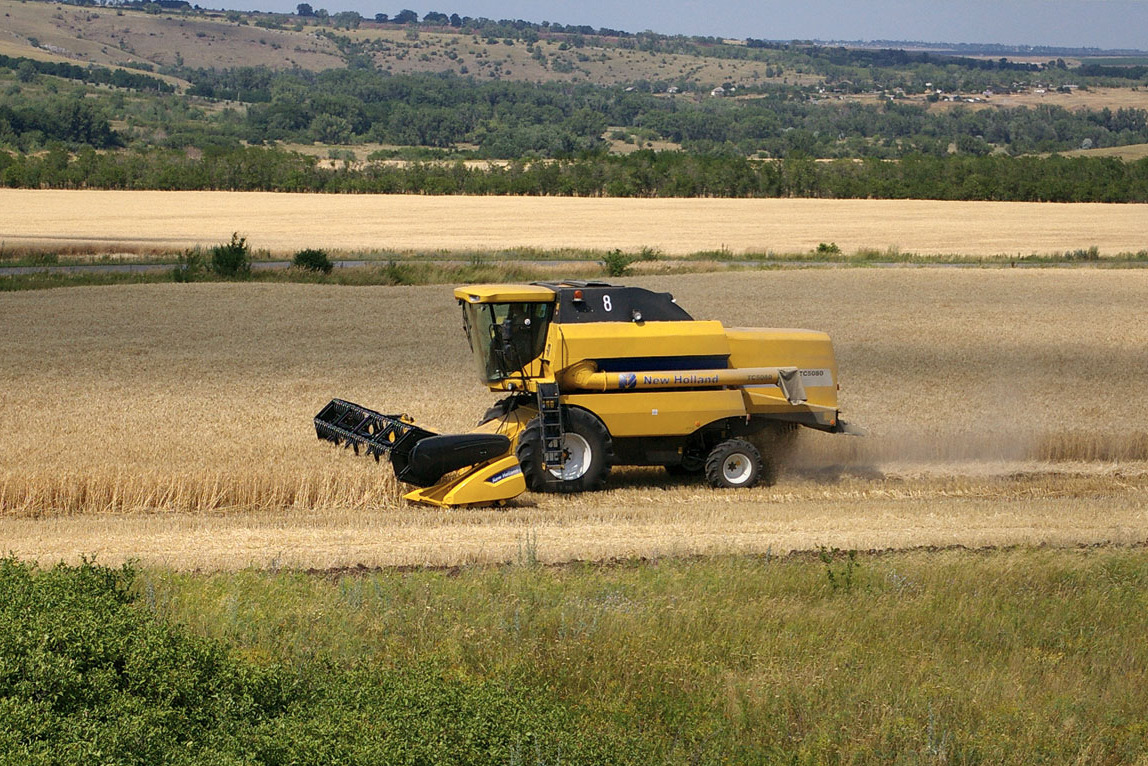
Wheat harvesting in Rostov Oblast

The food industry in Russia is a significant sector in the economy of Russia.

The volume of production in the manufacture of food products and tobacco - 3.12 trillion rubles (in 2010), including:

- Food production - 2.952 trillion rubles;
- Manufacture of tobacco products - 164 billion rubles.

As of 2020, Russia faces problems of over-nutrition with over 23% of the adults obese and over 57% overweight. Under 2.5% of the population suffer from undernourishment. Russia has formulated a Development of Healthy Lifestyle policy covering the years 2017 to 2025.

== History ==
In 2003 the volume of production in the food industry was 987 billion rubles (over $32 billion).

The volume of production in the manufacture of food products and tobacco in 2009 amounted to 2.77 trillion rubles, including:

- Food production - 2.626 trillion rubles;
- Manufacture of tobacco products - 148 billion rubles.

In 2008, Russia produced 2.9 million tons of meat, 2.5 million tons of sausages, 3.7 million tonnes of food fish production, 2.5 million tons of vegetable oil, 120 tons of tea, 413 million dal of mineral water.

The average monthly wage in the food and tobacco - 16982 rubles / month (March 2010).

== Beverages ==
=== Alcoholic beverage industry and winemaking ===
In 2008, Russia produced 50 million dal of wine grape.

Novorossiysk region (Krasnodar Krai) is one of the main wine centers of Russia. Local agro produce and tablespoons Sparkling wine.

In the municipality of Novorossiysk work wineries Abrau-Dyurso and "Myskhako."

In 2009, Russia exported vodka in the amount of 121 million dollars.

Enterprises:

- Of "Novokuznetsk Distillery"
- Barnaul Distillery

=== Brewing ===
In 2008, Russia produced 1.14 billion decaliters.

Enterprises:

- Company Baltika Breweries - Russia's largest beer producer, exporting its products to 46 countries.
  - Plant in Saint Petersburg
  - Plant in Voronezh
  - Plant in Novosibirsk
  - Plant in Krasnoyarsk
  - Plant in Samara
  - Plant in Tula
  - Plant in Khabarovsk
  - Plant in Chelyabinsk
  - Plant in Yaroslavl
- Ltd. "United Breweries Heineken"
  - Plant in Irkutsk
  - Plant in Sterlitamak
  - Plant in Kaliningrad
  - Plant in Khabarovsk
  - Plant in Saint Petersburg
  - Plant in Nizhny Novgorod
  - Plant in Ekaterinburg
  - Plant in Novosibirsk
- "SUN InBev", a branch in the city of Ivanovo (Ivanovo Brewery)
- Angarsk brewery
- Barnaul Brewery
- Zhiguli Brewery

=== Manufacture of soft drinks ===
- Plant Coca-Cola ("Coca-Cola HBC Eurasia") - the first and only factory in the Urals «The Coca-Cola Company», production lines which in 1998 provided all the products Ural region. It produces 130,000 bottles of the drink per hour.
  - Plant Coca-Cola in St. Petersburg.
  - Plant Coca-Cola in Samara
  - Plant Coca-Cola in Volzhsky
  - Plant Coca-Cola in Ekaterinburg
  - Plant Coca-Cola in Novosibirsk
  - Plant Coca-Cola in Krasnoyarsk
  - Plant Coca-Cola in Vladivostok
  - Plant Coca-Cola in Nizhny Novgorod
- PepsiCo Russia
  - Plant in Samara
  - Plant in Saint Petersburg
  - Plant in Ekaterinburg
  - Plant in Domodedovo
- Plant "Best-Bottling" - the manufacturer of soft drinks.
- JSC "Water Company" old source " - the manufacturer of soft drinks.

Plant Pepsi (OOO "Pepsi International Bottlers Yekaterinburg") - the largest in the Russian plant of PepsiCo, provides consumer products from Perm to Beijing a. In 2008 at the opening of the first factory in Russia and in the world production line beverage radically new technologies - hot filling. The estimated production capacity of the plant after a new line of 25 million units per year.

- Sverdlovsk bottler "Tonus" - a major manufacturer of various juice, mineral and carbonated beverages.

== Foods ==
=== Dairy industry ===
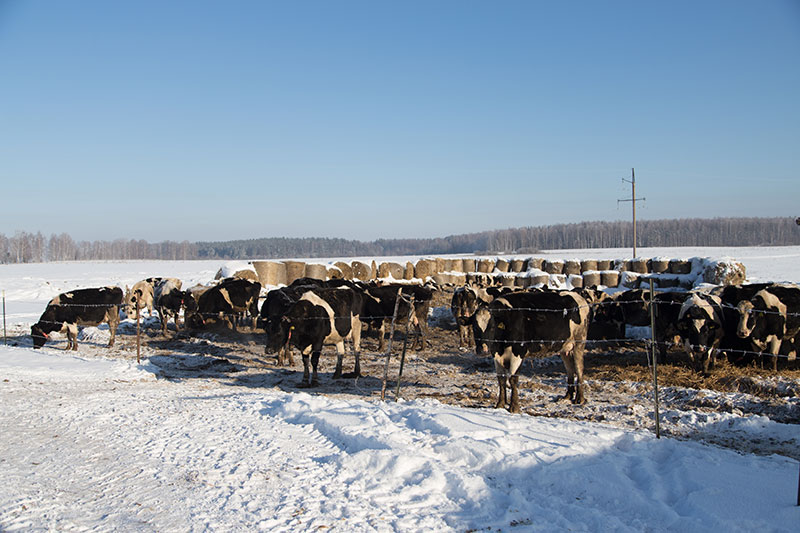
Dairy cattle in Russia

Enterprises:

- OAO "Miassky dairy factory", from 1936 - the production of dairy products
- Kiprinsky dairy plant
- Wimm-Bill-Dann - a company engaged in the production of dairy products and non-alcoholic beverages (juice, water).
- Unimilk - Russian Food Company, one of the leaders of the country's dairy market. Since 2010 Unmilk has been owned by Danone.

=== Enterprises ===
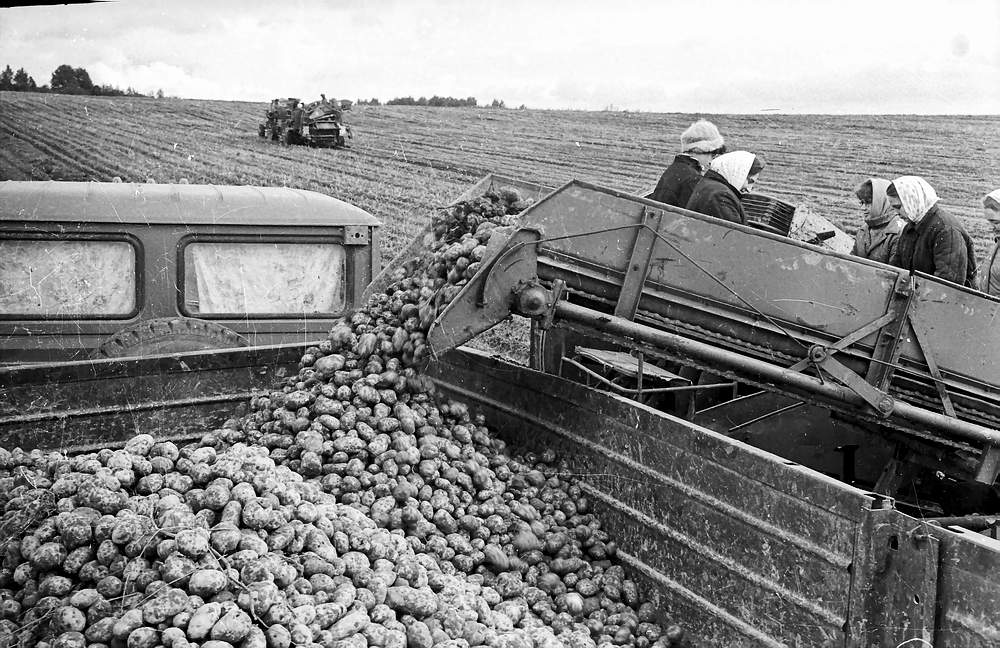
Potato production in Russia, 1979

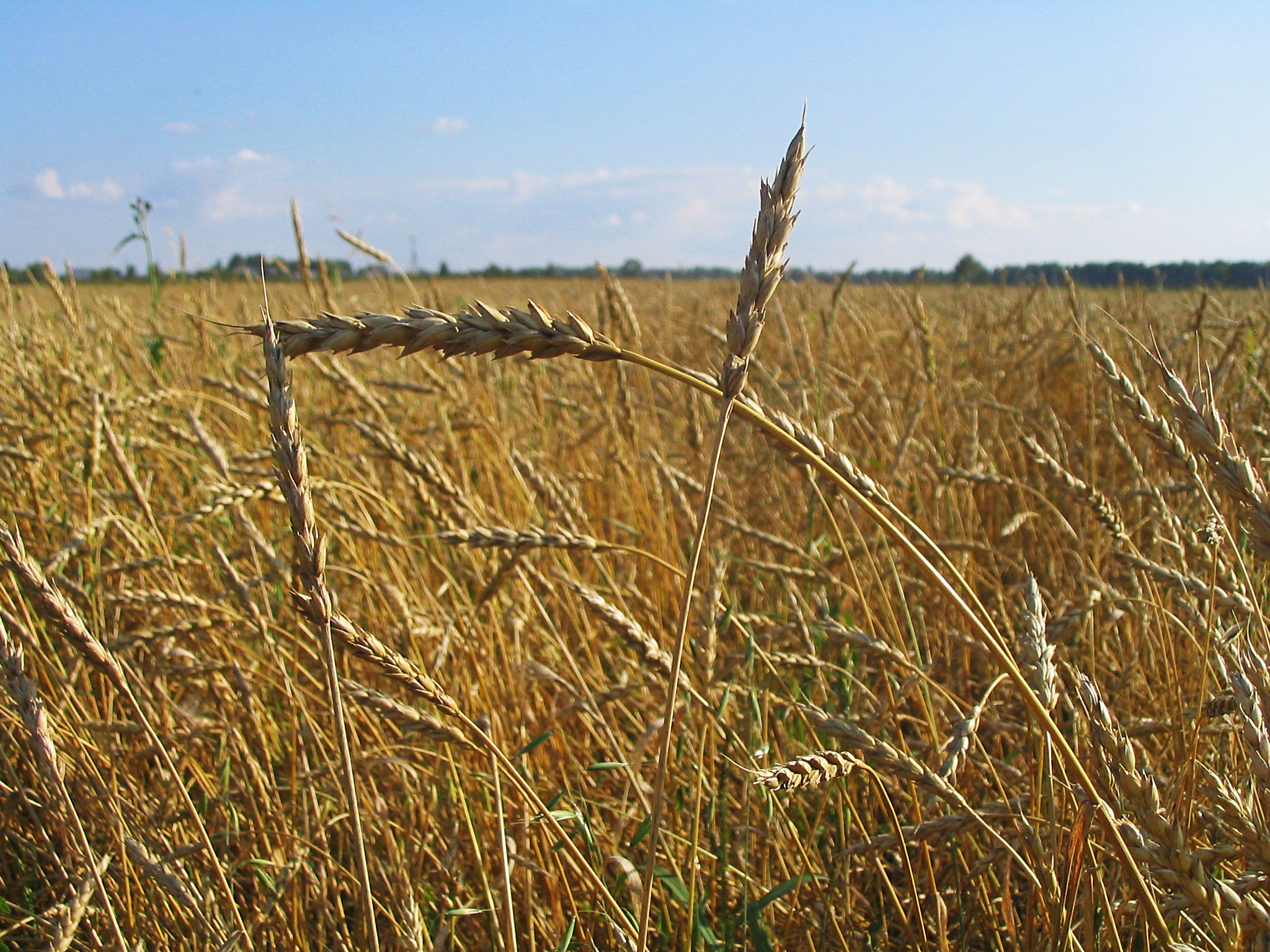
Wheat in Tomsk, Siberia, Russia

- Russky Produkt OAO - largest domestic producer of grocery products producing dehydrated soups, potato chips, cereal, noodles, coffee, tea, instant chicory, coffee beverages, dehydrated jelly, spices and seasonings, semi-finished products for the preparation of pastries.
- hlebomakaronny Sverdlovsk Plant - the first in Sverdlovsk Region industrial baking company, founded in 1927, is now part of the holding "McFee" .
- Yekaterinburg fat factory - a company, a member of the top five producers of fatty foods in Russia. The product range - different names for sunflower oil, margarine, ketchup, mayonnaise, mustard, spreads (trade mark "Avedov", "Generous Summer"). Also running line for soap (more than 10 items).
- OAO "Miassky meat" from 1893 (based FA Fokerodtom) - production of natural oils and fats, meat, seafood
- OAO "Bread" (Miassky bakery), from 1962 - production of bakery products* Company "Miassky elevator."
- Chernovskoy Hleb - the largest in Miass industrial baking company, founded in 1995.
- JSC "Kuzbass Food Works"
- Of "Novokuznetsk khladokombinat"
- Altaikholod
- Barnaul gormolkombinat
- Barnaul mill
- Barnaul yeast plant
- Altai pasta
- Barnaul Bakery number 4
- Frito-Lay
  - Plant in Azov
  - Plant in Kashira

=== Meat industry ===
- SHP "Vdohnovenie" - produces of hand-made dumplings and one of the largest distributors of turkey meat.
- Bryukhovetsky Krolik - largest producer of duck meat and rabbit in Russia.
- Food Factory "Good taste" - produces a variety of sausages and meat finished products.
- Miratorg is one of the largest producers and distributors of meat products in Russia.
- Poultry "Sverdlovsk" - a major producer of poultry meat and eggs.
- Yekaterinburg Meat - the oldest company in its industry, founded in 1939, produces a variety of meat products.

== Tobacco industry ==
In Russia there are about 80 tobacco companies. Leading companies tobacco industry: ABC Russia (Moscow), Inc. Liggett-Ducat (Moscow), Inc. Petro (St. Petersburg) Ltd Tobacco Factory Reemtsma-Volga (Volgograd).

== See also ==
- Agriculture in Russia
