= Pestana CR7 Lifestyle Hotels =

Hotel brand

- Type: Hotel brand (four-star lifestyle)
- Industry: Hospitality
- Founded: 2015 (announced 17 December 2015, Lisbon)
- First hotel: Pestana CR7 Funchal (1 July 2016)
- Founders / owners: Pestana Hotel Group and Cristiano Ronaldo (50/50 joint venture)
- Operator: Pestana Hotel Group
- Headquarters: Funchal, Madeira, Portugal
- Hotels in operation: 5 (a sixth under development) As of 2026
- Locations: Funchal, Lisbon, Madrid, New York City, Marrakesh (Paris planned)
- Rooms: Approximately 649 in operation
- Initial investment: Approximately €75 million
- Parent: Pestana Hotel Group
- Related: Museu CR7
- Website: www.pestana.com

Pestana CR7 Lifestyle Hotels (branded Pestana CR7) is a hotel brand created in 2015 as an equally held (50/50) partnership between the Pestana Hotel Group and the footballer Cristiano Ronaldo. The hotels are owned in equal shares by the two partners and operated by the Pestana Hotel Group. The brand takes its name from Ronaldo's initials and his shirt number, 7.

The partnership was announced in Lisbon on 17 December 2015 as a four-star lifestyle concept, with four properties and an initial investment of around €75 million and 500 rooms planned in Funchal, Lisbon, Madrid and New York - cities associated with Ronaldo's life and career. The brand later expanded to Marrakesh, in Morocco, and currently has a further property under development in Paris.

== History ==
On 17 December 2015, at a press conference in Lisbon, Cristiano Ronaldo and Dionísio Pestana, chairman of the Pestana Hotel Group, announced a €75 million project to build four hotels under the Pestana CR7 Lifestyle Hotels brand. The partners stated that the properties would be owned in equal shares and managed by the Pestana Hotel Group, totalling between 400 and 500 rooms.

The first property, the Pestana CR7 Funchal, opened on 1 July 2016 in Ronaldo's home city, in the archipelago of Madeira; the opening was attended by the President of the Republic, Marcelo Rebelo de Sousa. The hotel is located next to the Museu CR7, dedicated to Cristiano Ronaldo's trophies. The second property, the Pestana CR7 Lisboa, opened on 16 August 2016 in the Baixa Pombalina, in Lisbon.

The Pestana CR7 Gran Vía Madrid opened in soft opening on 7 June 2021, in a refurbished 1920s building, and the Pestana CR7 Times Square was inaugurated in New York in 2021. In January 2023 the brand opened the Pestana CR7 Marrakech, its first property in Africa.

A further property was also announced on the Rive Gauche in Paris, next to the Gare d'Austerlitz, as the brand's sixth hotel - the largest in capacity, with around 210 rooms and an investment of some €60 million. In 2026 the hotel was under construction, with opening scheduled for 2027.

== Properties ==
In 2026, the brand operates five hotels, with a sixth under development.

Hotel	City / Country	Opening	Rooms (approx.)
Pestana CR7 Funchal	Funchal, Portugal	2016	49
Pestana CR7 Lisboa	Lisbon, Portugal	2016	82
Pestana CR7 Gran Vía Madrid	Madrid, Spain	2021	168
Pestana CR7 Times Square	New York, United States	2021	176
Pestana CR7 Marrakech	Marrakesh, Morocco	2023	174
Pestana CR7 Paris	Paris, France	under development	210

== Concept and design ==
Pestana CR7 Lifestyle Hotels positions itself as a four-star lifestyle brand aimed at a younger, design-conscious audience, with interiors that evoke Ronaldo's career. Design elements reported in the press include screens in the lobby and in the lifts that tell his life story, sound effects on the staircases recreating the atmosphere of a football stadium, and motifs such as a sequence of seven footprints on the bedroom carpets. At the launch, the trade press described the concept as sitting between lifestyle brands such as W Hotels and Radisson Red.

== Museu CR7 and brand extension ==
The Funchal hotel stands next to the Museu CR7, which reopened on 6 June 2016 in a space of around 1,400 square metres and which brings together Ronaldo's trophies, including his Ballon d'Or awards and other distinctions. The Pestana CR7 Lifestyle Hotels form part of a wider CR7 brand built around the footballer, which also covers eyewear, footwear, underwear and fragrances. The footballer owns 50% of the hotel chain.

Inverse by CR7 is a sports bar concept created in 2025 for the Pestana CR7 Lifestyle Hotels. The venue combines broadcasts of sporting events, dining, cocktails, music and entertainment, with an identity inspired by the world of sport. The menu, shared across all the properties, was developed by executive chef Borja Veguillas, of the Pestana Gran Vía Madrid, while allowing for local dishes at each destination.

== Recognition ==
The Pestana CR7 Lifestyle Hotels have received awards at the World Travel Awards. In 2025, the group reported continental distinctions for several CR7 properties, including the Pestana CR7 Gran Vía Madrid ("Spain's Leading Boutique Hotel") and the Pestana CR7 Times Square ("North America's Leading Lifestyle Hotel").
