= Pestana =

Pestana or Pestaña may refer to:

- Ángel Pestaña (1886–1937), Spanish Anarcho-syndicalist and later Syndicalist leader
- Augusto Pestana, Brazilian city in the State of Rio Grande do Sul
- Augusto Pestana (politician), Brazilian engineer and politician
- Hélio Pestana (born 1985), Portuguese actor and model, booked by Layjan agency
- Paulo Dinarte Gouveia Pestana (born 1985), Portuguese footballer
- Pestana Group, currently the largest Portuguese tourism and leisure group
- Pestana Hotels and Resorts, brand of the Pestana Group
