= Casino da Madeira =

Casino in Funchal, Madeira, Portugal

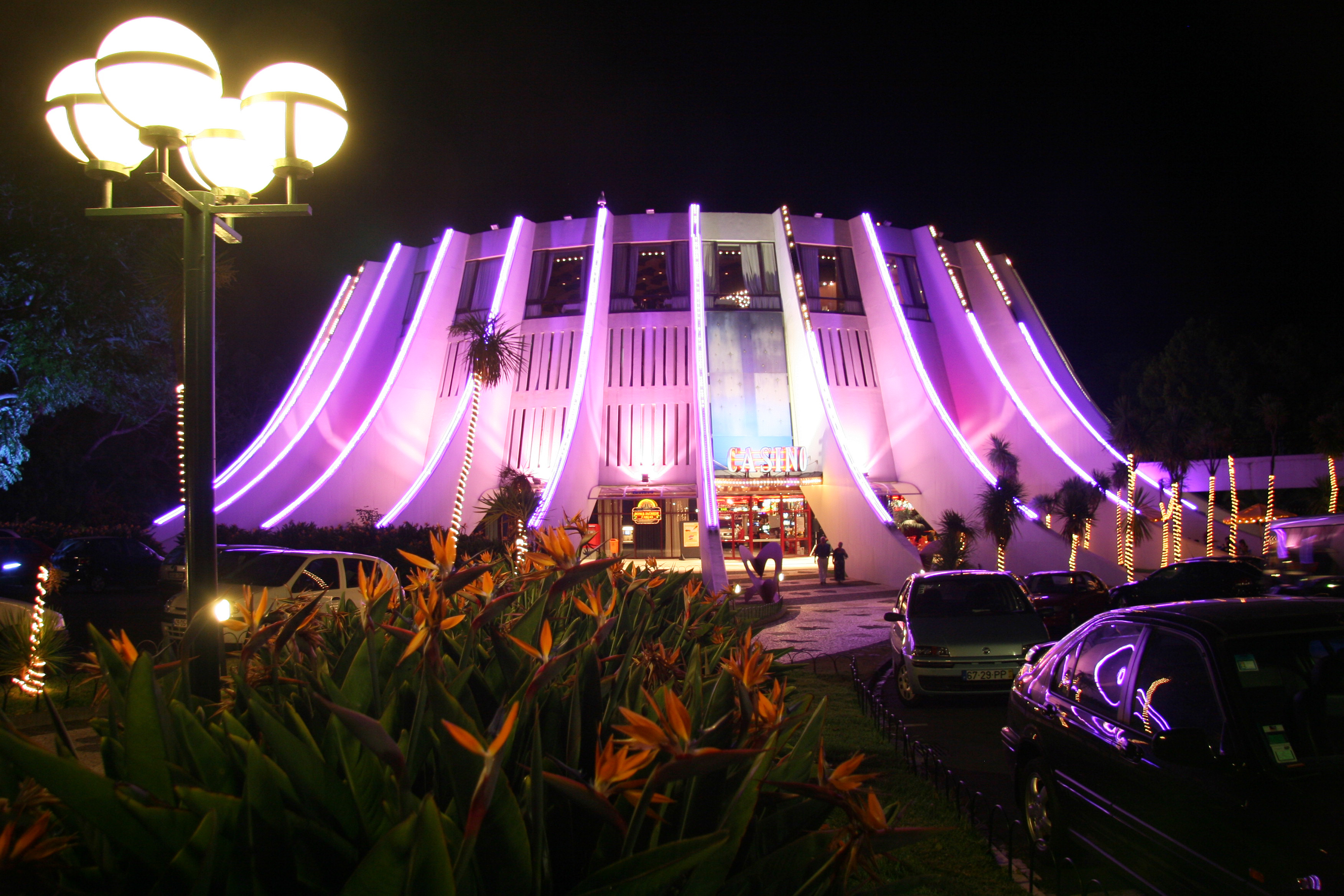
- Casino at night

- Location within Madeira
- Interactive map of Casino da Madeira
- Location: Funchal, Madeira; Av. Do Infante, 9004-513 Funchal, Madeira, Portugal; 32°38′39.1″N 16°54′58.3″W
- Opened: 1976; 50 years ago
- Casino type: Land-based
- Owner: Pestana Hotels and Resorts
- Website: www.casinodamadeira.com

Casino da Madeira (Casino of Madeira) is a casino located in Funchal, Madeira, Portugal, which is part of the hotel Pestana Casino Park. It was designed in 1966, but work did not begin until six years later, and it opened in 1976.

While popularly attributed to Brazilian architect Oscar Niemeyer, it was in fact co-designed by Viana de Lima, a Portuguese architect from Esposende. In a 2007 interview with Expresso, Niemeyer revealed that he did not actually consider it to be his own project at all, but rather de Lima's. Niemeyer claimed that while he had provided the initial designs, they were subsequently modified.
