= Strela (beer) =

Beer from Cape Verde

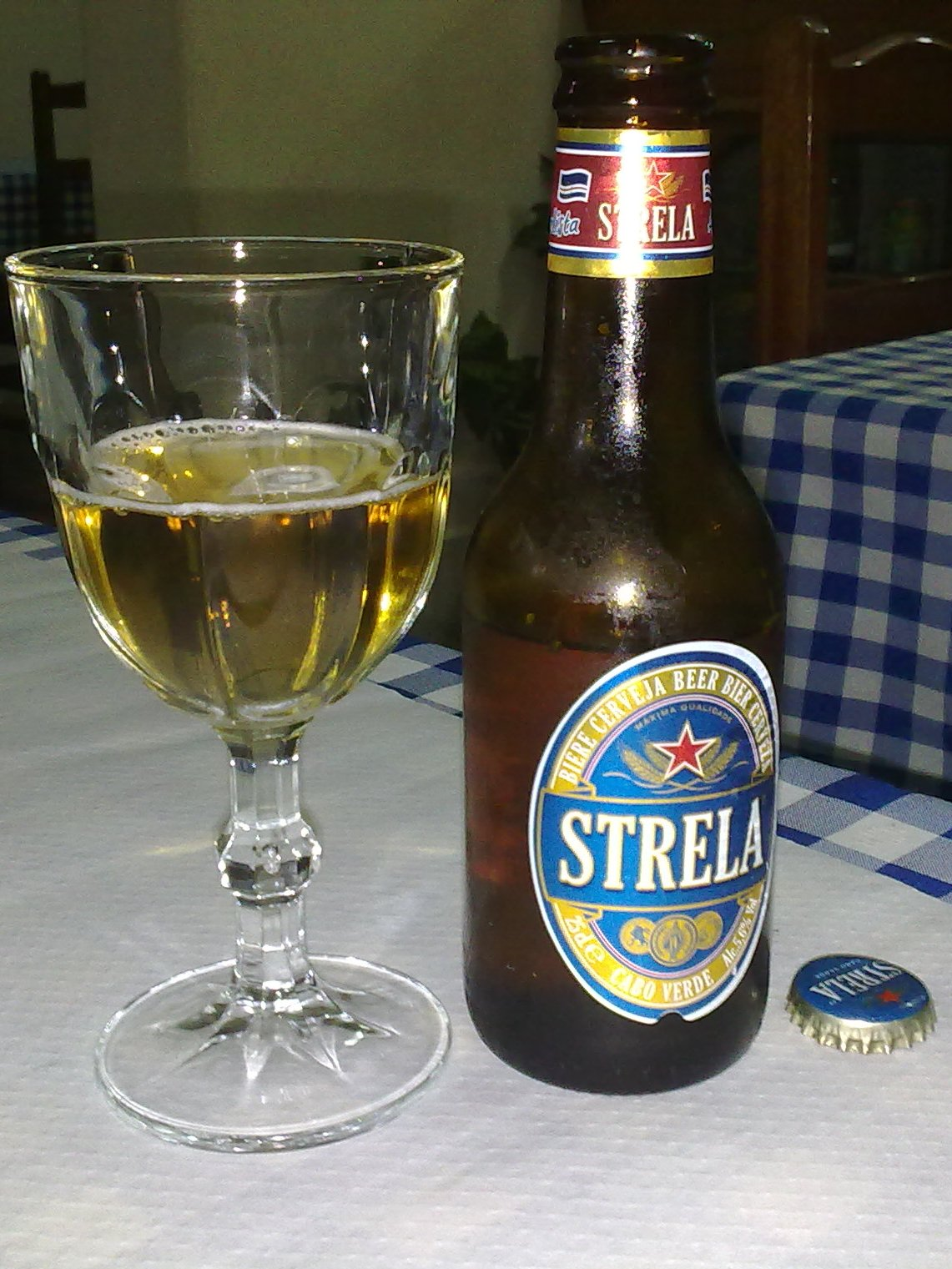
Strela in a restaurant in the island of Boa Vista

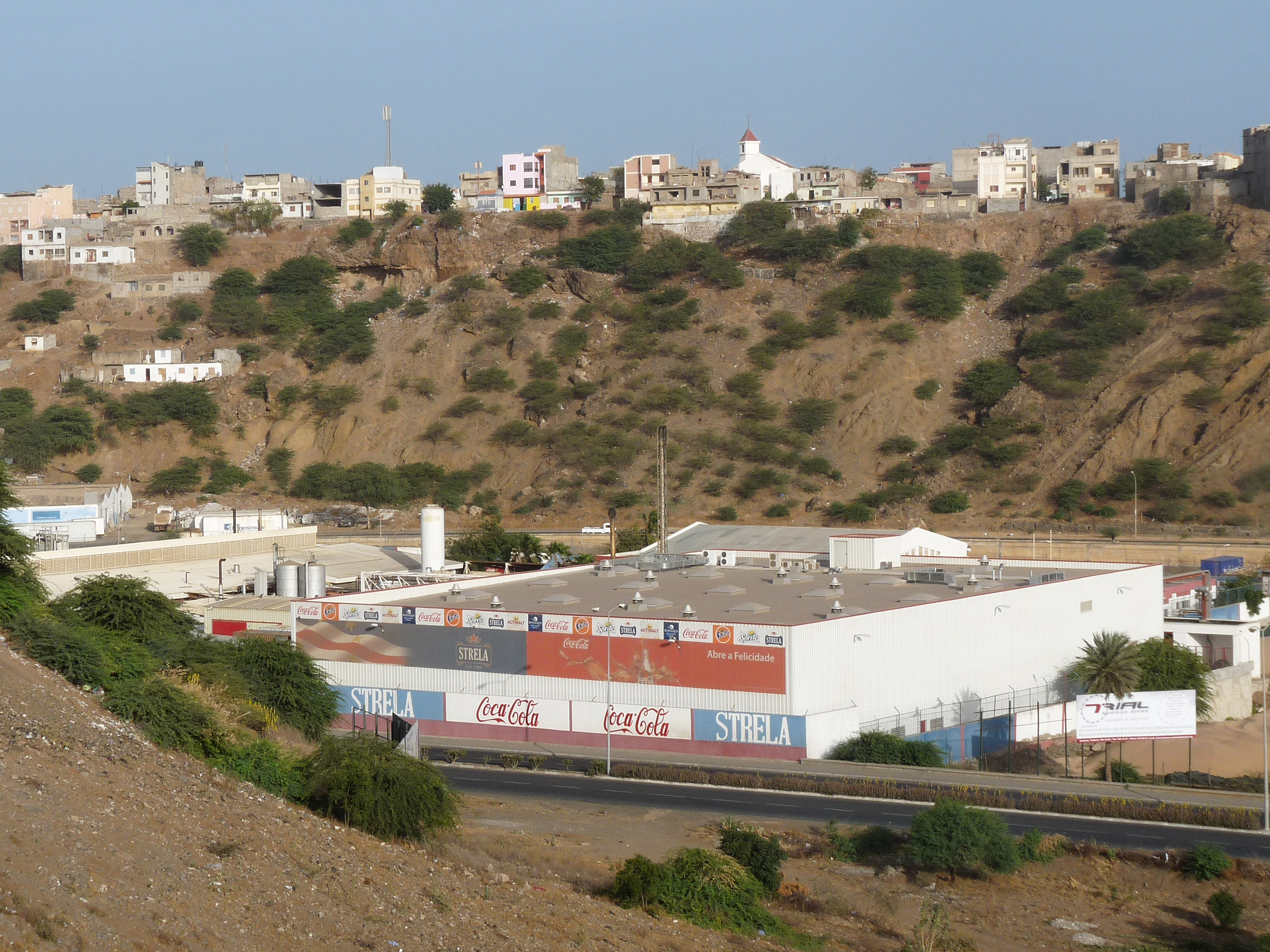
CERIS factory in east Praia, where the beer Strela is manufactured

Strela is a beer that is produced by the company CERIS, based in the eastern part of Praia, Cape Verde. The name Strela is Cape Verdean Creole for "star" and seems to have nothing to do with the Russian word for "arrow". Production of the beer was started in November 2006, replacing the production of Coral, a brand of CERIS's former owner Madeira Brewery. Cavibel distributes the beer. CERIS and Cavibel are owned by Equatorial Coca-Cola Bottling Company. Strela beer is exported to Gambia, Guinea and Portugal.

In 2016, Strela beer received a Superior Taste Award from the International Taste & Quality Institute (iTQi) in Brussels. In 2009, Strela was the second most consumed beer in Cape Verde, covering 35% of the market.
