= SCCR =

SCCR may refer to:

- Standing Committee on Copyright and Related Rights at WIPO
- Supreme Council of the Cultural Revolution, an Iranian planning body
- Short circuit current rating, the maximum safe current for a short-circuited electrical component
- Sociedade Cabo-verdiana de Cerveja e Refrigerantes, a brewery in Cape Verde
