= Ricardo Velosa =

Brazilian-Portuguese sculptor (born 1947)

- Born: Ricardo Jorge Abrantes Velosa; January 3, 1947 (age 79); Rio de Janeiro, Brazil
- Occupation: Sculptor

Ricardo Velosa is a Brazilian-born Portuguese sculptor and a professor at the Higher Institute of Plastic Arts at the University of Madeira. He is known for creating sculptures of prolific Portuguese figures on the island of Madeira.

== Works ==
He is known for creating several works, the best known of his being the statue of Cristiano Ronaldo outside the entrance of Museu CR7 located in Funchal, Portugal. Other notable works of his include sculpting a bronze bust portrait of Francisco Sá Carneiro, the former prime minister of Portugal from January to December 1980 along with a sculpture called the Homenagem aos Carreiros, depicting a toboggan driver pushing his cart downhill.

Other works of his also include a prominent statue of Júlio Dinis, an important novelist and poet of modern Portugal, being the first to produce literature meant for middle-class readers. One of his notable works around Funchal is a mermaid sculpture named the Sereia do Funchal (Mermaid of Funchal), which is located on the banks of the Funchal harbor.

== Gallery ==
Notable works
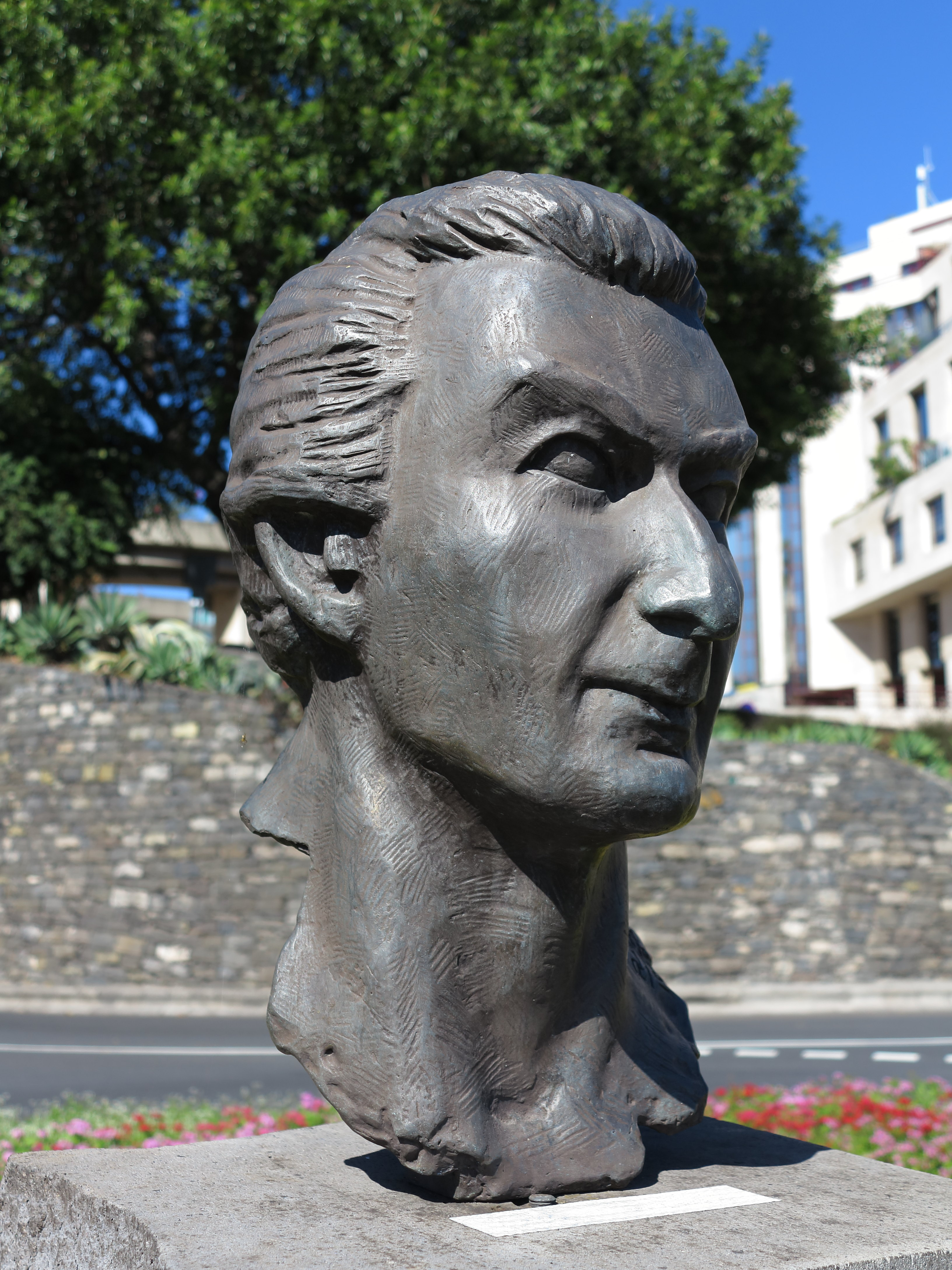
The bronze bust of Francisco Sá Carneiro, former prime minister of Portugal

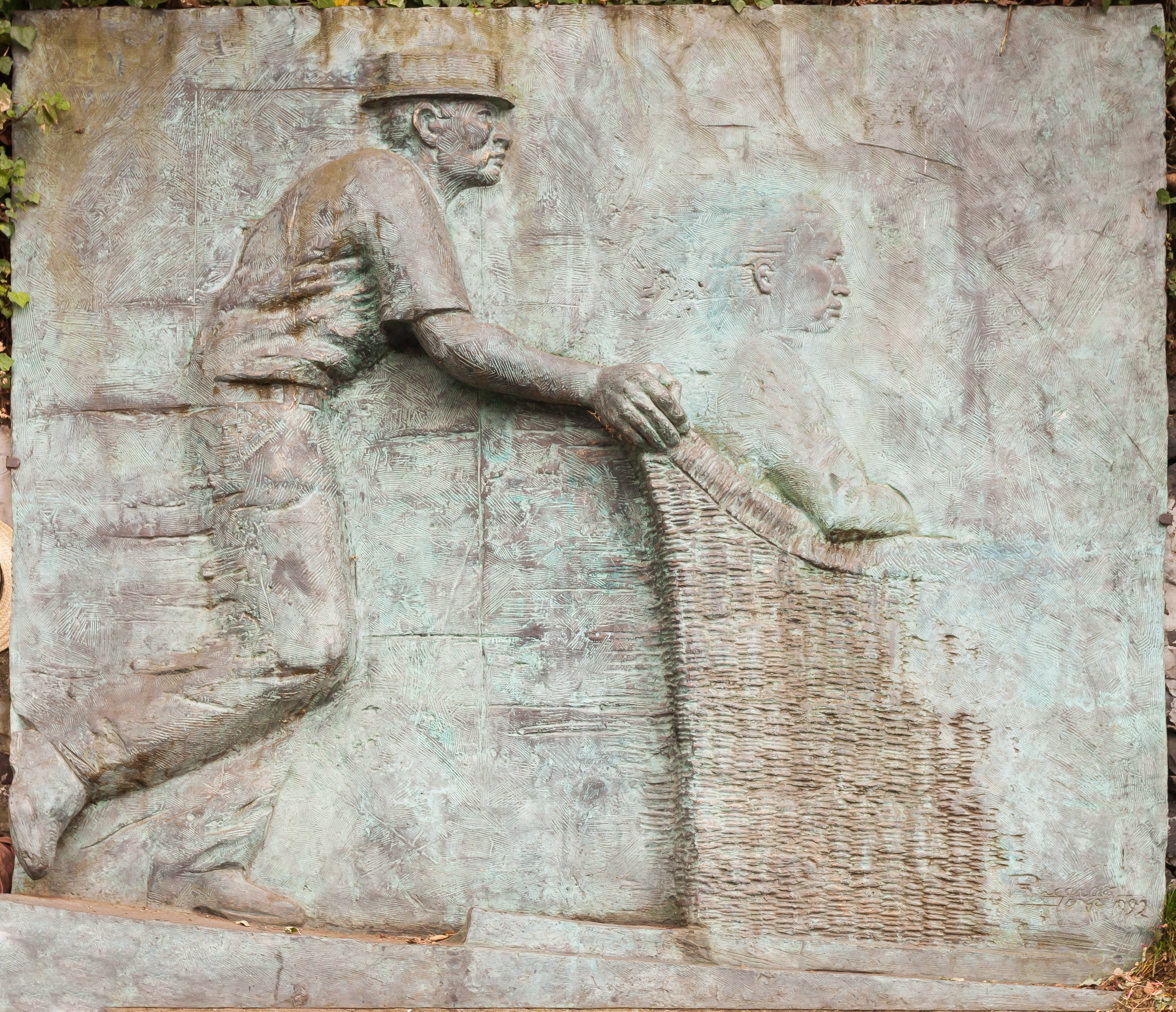
A representation of the Homenagem aos Carreiros in Funchal, Madeira

A video of the statue of Cristiano Ronaldo directly outside the museum

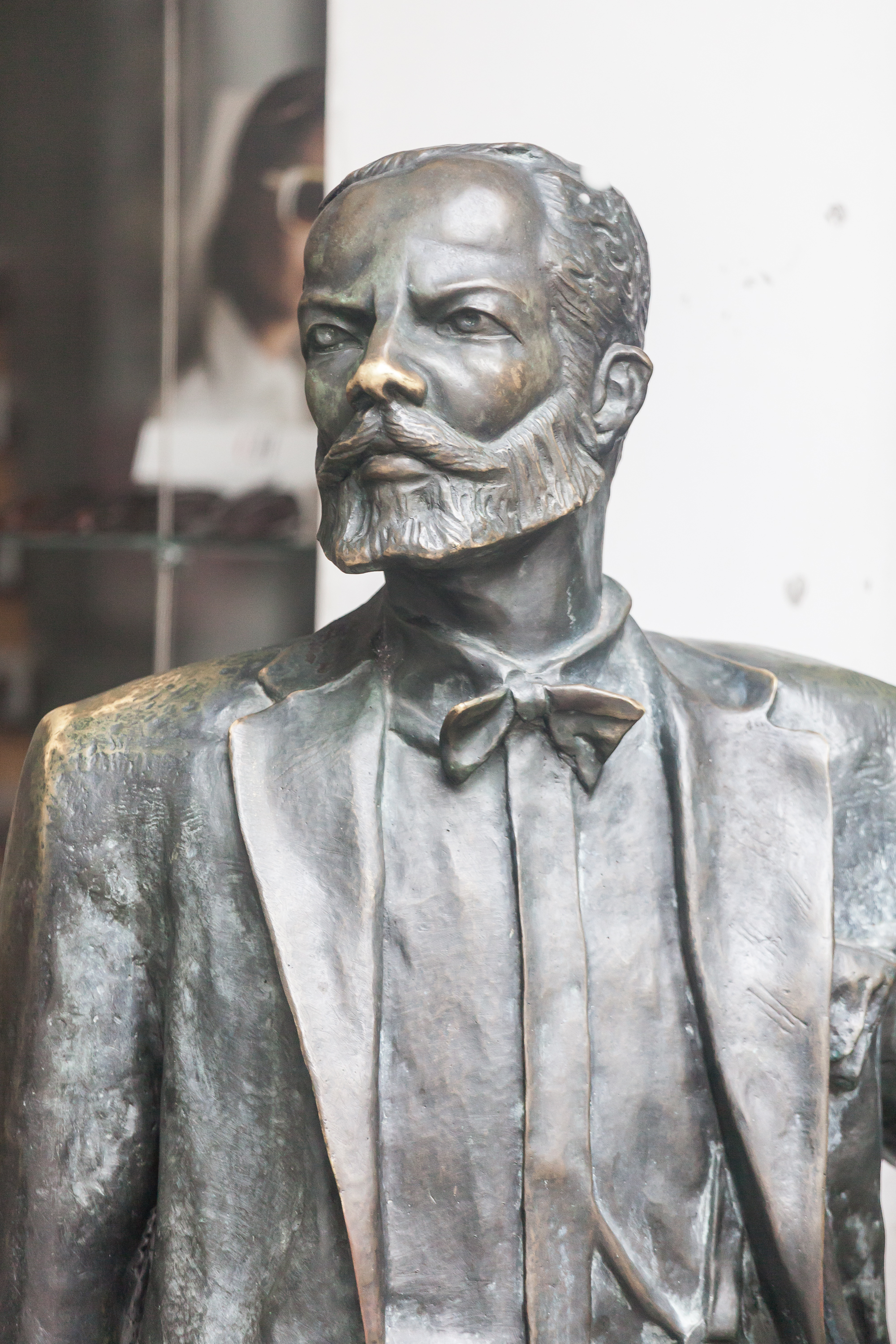
Statue of Júlio Dinis, notable Portuguese medical doctor and writer.

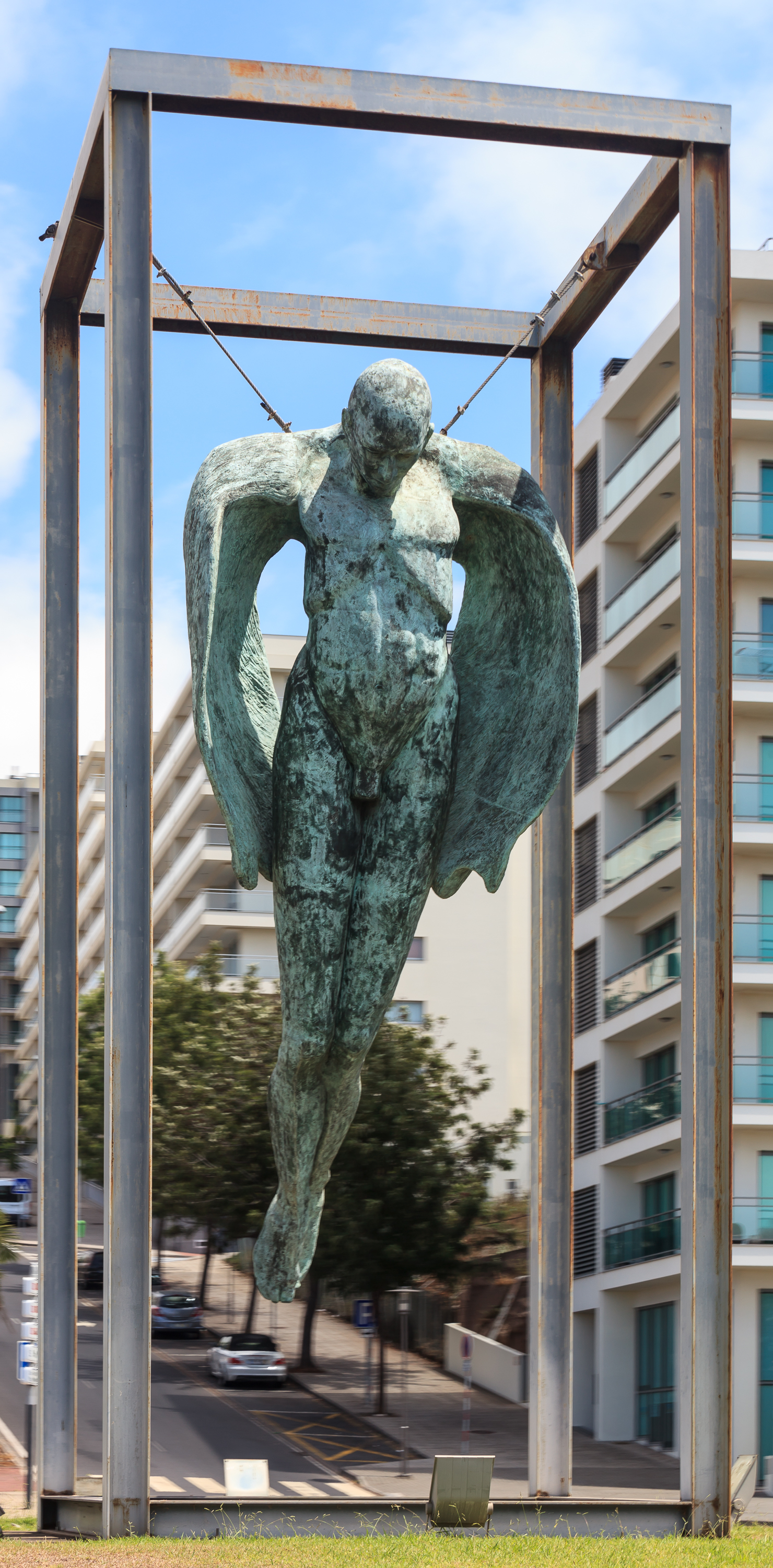
Monumento ao Trabalhador in Funchal, Madeira

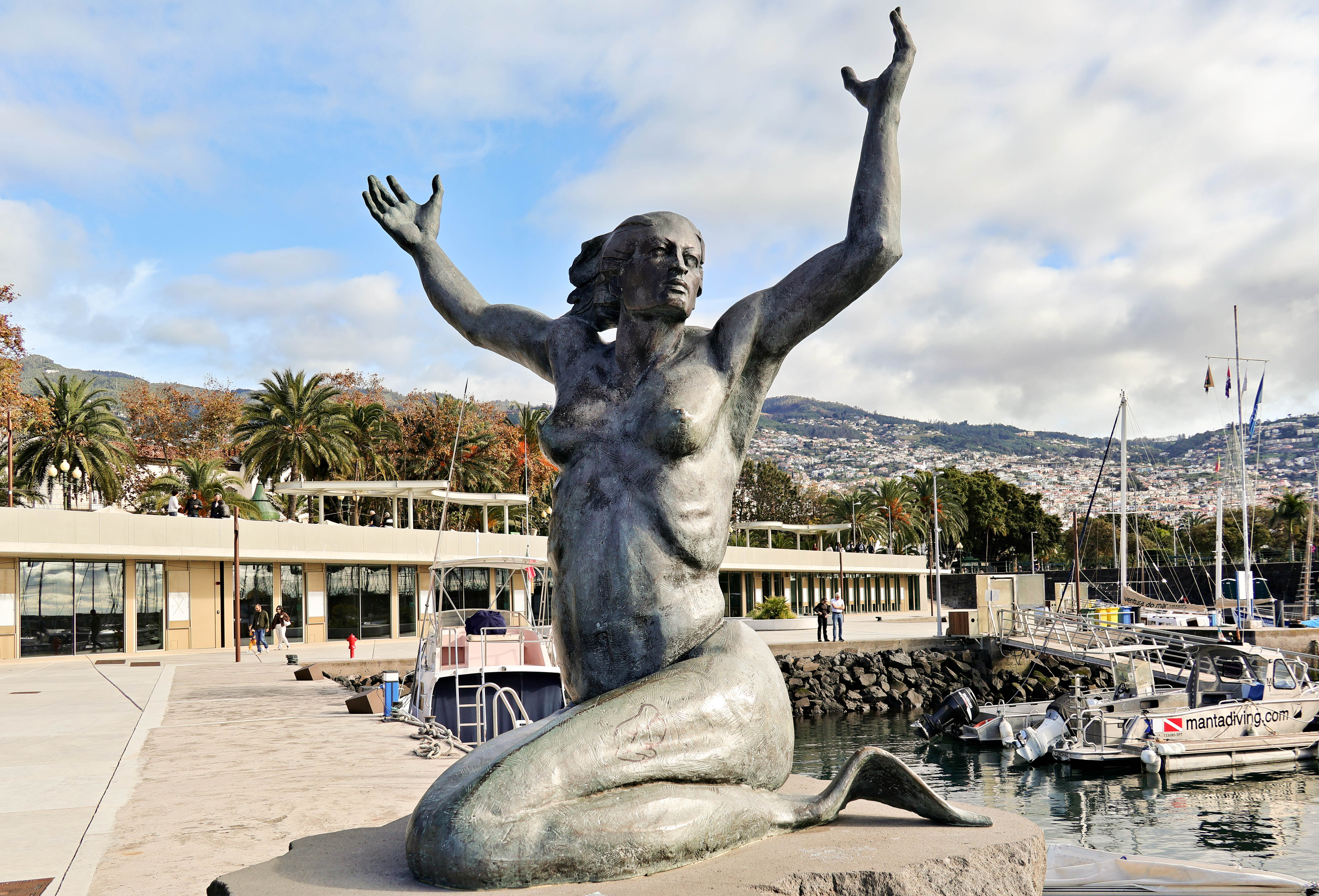
Sereia do Funchal on the banks of Funchal harbor.
