= CERIS =

Beverage company in Cape Verde

Coordinates: 14.9187°N 23.5046°W

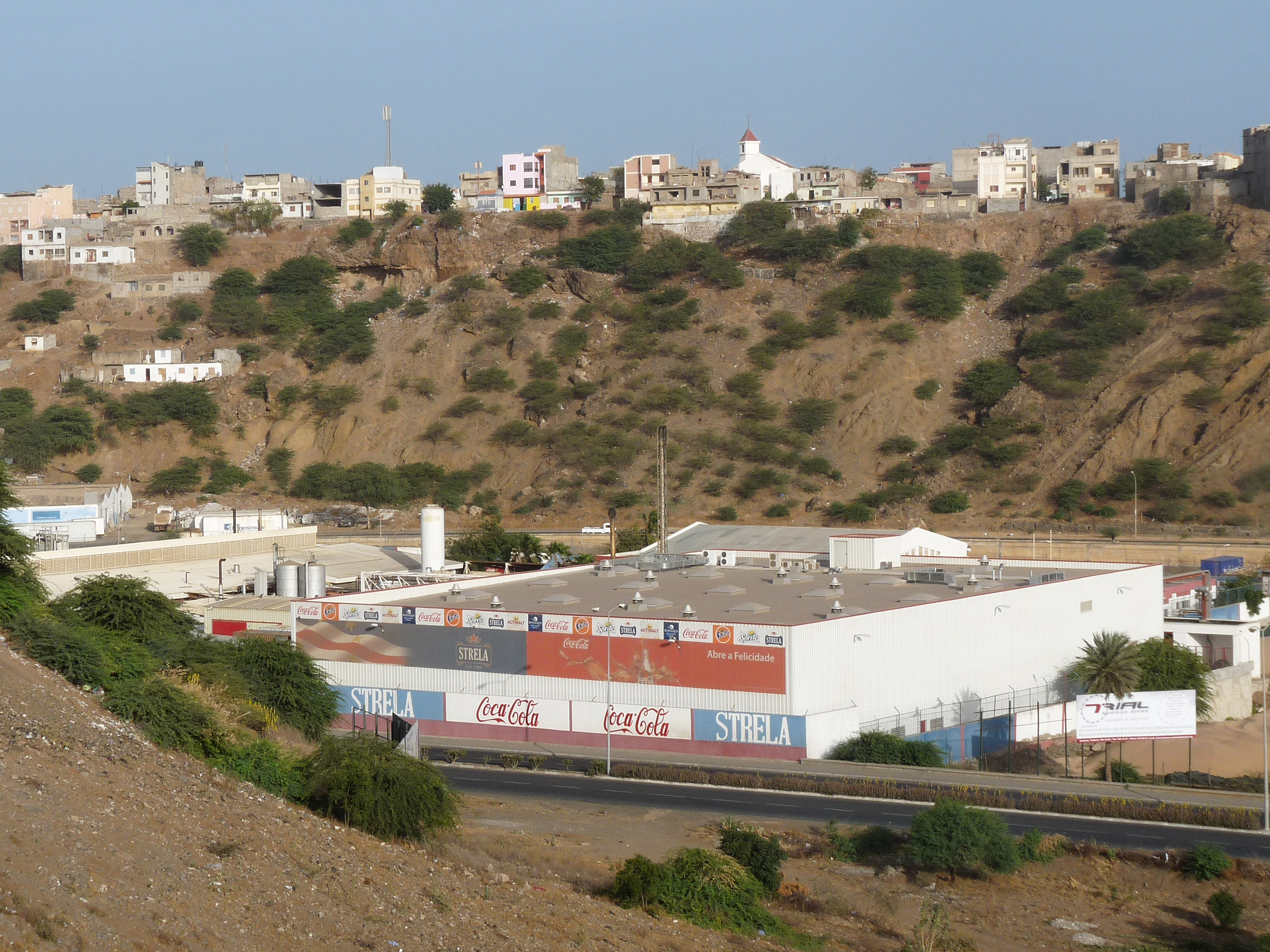
- Company type: SARL
- Founded: 1988
- Headquarters: Praia, Cape Verde
- Products: beverages
- Owner: Equatorial Coca-Cola Bottling Company
- Website: www.cavibel.com

CERIS is a beverage company in Cape Verde that produces beer, soft drinks and water. Together with the distribution company Cavibel, it is owned by Equatorial Coca-Cola Bottling Company. CERIS was established as a mixed capital (public/private) company in 1988. In 2001 it was acquired by the Madeira Brewery, and in January 2005 the majority of its shares were sold to the shareholders of Cavibel, part of Equatorial Coca-Cola Bottling Company. It produces the brands Bonaqua, Schweppes, Fanta, Sprite, Coca-Cola, Ceris, the Cape Verdean beer Strela, Ego, Actimalt and Vimto. The factory is located in the neighbourhood Praia Negra, east of the city centre of Praia, the capital of Cape Verde.

== See also ==
- List of companies of Cape Verde
