= Museu CR7 =

Museum on the Portuguese island of Madeira

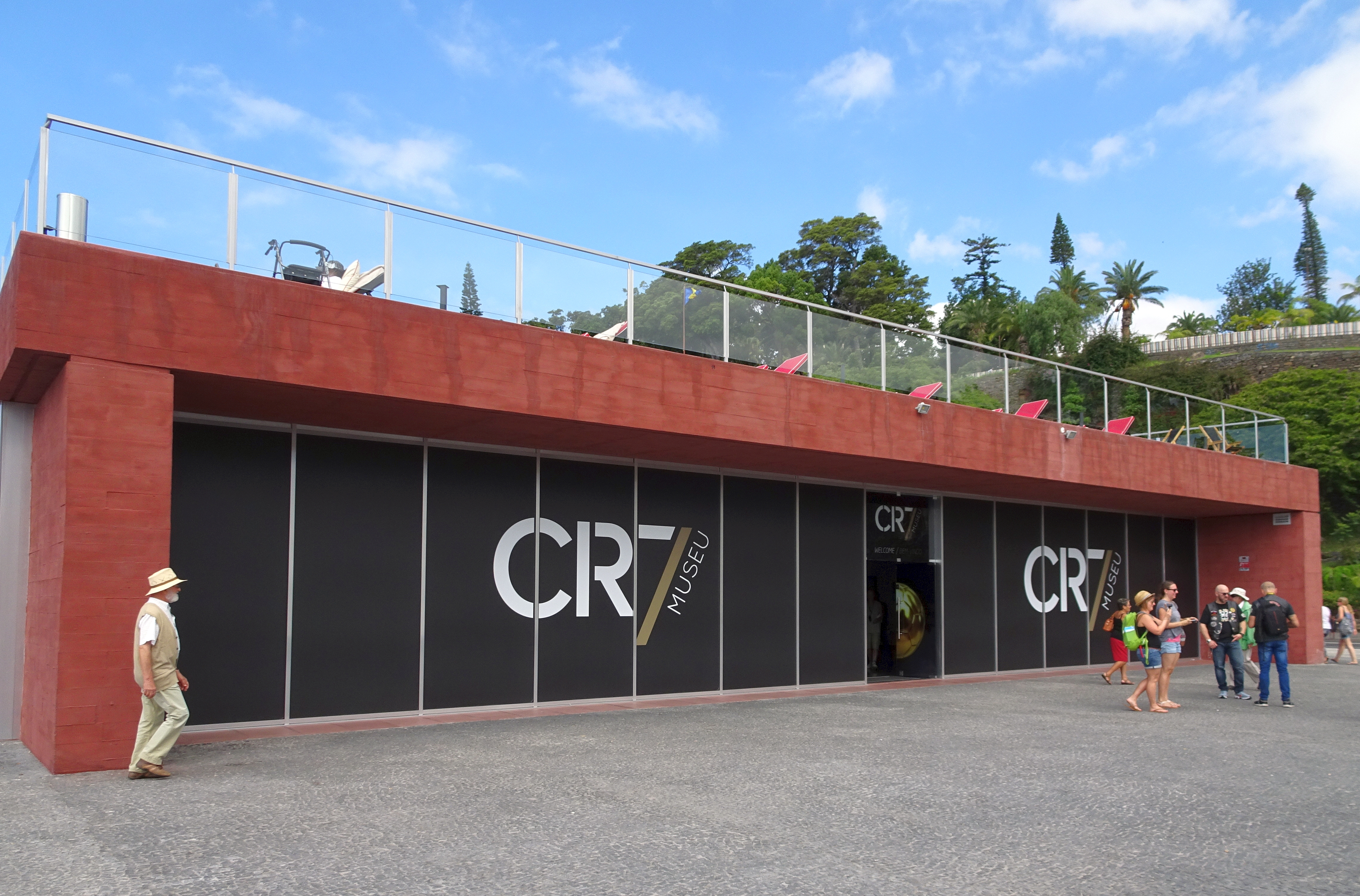
- Entrance to the Museu CR7
- Established: 15 December 2013; 12 years ago
- Location: Sé, Funchal, Madeira, Portugal
- Coordinates: 32°38′38.50″N 16°54′50.10″W
- Director: Cristiano Ronaldo
- Website: museucr7.com

The Museu CR7 is a museum dedicated to Portuguese footballer Cristiano Ronaldo's trophies. It is located in Ronaldo's birthplace, the city of Funchal on the Portuguese island of Madeira.

Above the museum is a hotel, built in partnership between Ronaldo and the Pestana Group. The floor of the current museum, similar to the previous one, is in a Portuguese pavement style and decorated with the logo of the museum. The museum was an official sponsor of the local football team União da Madeira.

In front of the museum, there is a bronze statue of Cristiano Ronaldo, made by the Madeiran sculptor Ricardo Velosa.

== History ==
The museum was inaugurated on 15 December 2013 by Ronaldo's former club Sporting CP. Other participants in the opening ceremony were the second President of the Regional Government of Madeira Alberto João Jardim, Pepe, Paulo Bento, Emilio Butragueño and the girlfriend of Ronaldo at the time, Irina Shayk. At the opening, the collection had 126 trophies on display. The original location of the museum was in a 400 square metres (4,300 sq ft) space located on Rua Imperatriz Dona Amélia in Sé, Funchal.

On 24 March 2016, the bronze statue of Ronaldo was moved several meters from its location near the road Avenida Sá Carneiro to be in front of then under-construction hotel and new museum, closer to the port of Funchal, with the stand of the statue being altered.

On 6 June 2016, the museum was reopened, having moved to a new larger location on the Praça do Mar, also in Sé, Funchal, occupying a 1,400 square metres (15,000 sq ft) space below the Pestana CR7 Hotel, a joint venture between Ronaldo and the Pestana Group.

The official inauguration of the hotel was on 1 July 2016, with Ronaldo, along with the President of Portugal, Marcelo Rebelo de Sousa, the Presidents of the Regional Government of Madeira, Miguel Albuquerque and the President of the Pestana Group, Dionísio Pestana attending.

During the inauguration of the hotel, the square was named from Praça do Mar to Praça CR7.

== Exhibits ==
The exhibition includes photographs and videos emblematic of the athlete's career and wax works of Ronaldo with pictorial backgrounds with which visitors can take photographs. The museum has all the youth and professional trophies won by Ronaldo at the clubs of CF Andorinha, Nacional da Madeira, Sporting CP, Manchester United, Real Madrid, Juventus and Al-Nassr and the Portugal national team.
