= Madeira Brewery =

Brewery in Madeira, Portugal

Empresa de Cervejas da Madeira (Madeira Brewery)
- Industry: Alcoholic beverage Soft drink
- Founded: 1872; 154 years ago
- Headquarters: Funchal, Madeira Island; Portugal
- Products: Beer; Brisa & Laranjada
- Owner: Pestana Group
- Website: http://www.ecm.pt/

The Madeira Brewery (Portuguese: Empresa de Cervejas da Madeira or E.C.M) is a brewery in Madeira. The main brand is Coral Lager. The company is the biggest producer and drink distributor in the Autonomous Region of Madeira. It produces alcoholic and non-alcoholic beverages. Until 2007, ECM drinks had been awarded 117 Monde Selection awards. However, Monde Selection awards are non-competitive and only products that pay to enter are judged.

== Brands (in alphabetical order) ==
=== Brisa ===
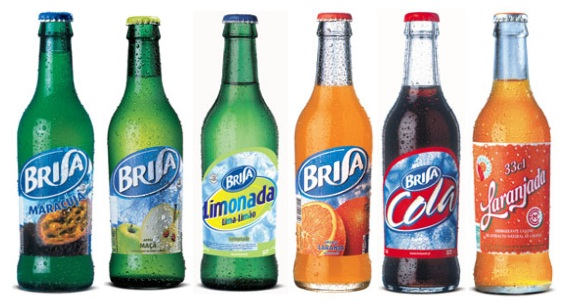
Brisa carbonated drinks

- Brisa Água Tónica
- Brisa Ananás
- Brisa Cola
- Brisa Cola Light
- Brisa Cola Zero
- Brisa Laranja
- Brisa Limonada
- Brisa Maçã
- Brisa Maracujá
- Brisa Manga Mix
- Soda Water
- BriSol Laranja
- BriSol Maracujá
- BriSol Trópico
- BriSol Maçã
- Brisol Manga Zero
- BriTea Limão
- BriTea Pêssego
- BriTea Maracujá

=== Coral & Zarco ===
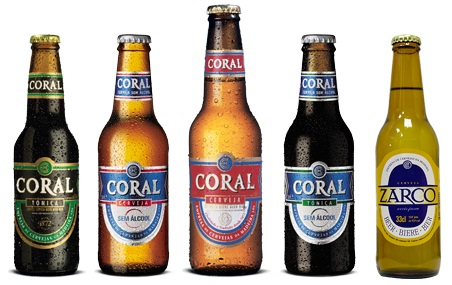
Coral & Zarco

Coral was first introduced in 1969 and is distributed in Madeira and the Portuguese mainland; it is exported to the US, UK, Australia and Angola.

- Coral Branca Lager (5.3% Vol) introduced in 1969
- Coral Tónica Stout (5.1% Vol) introduced in 1969
- Coral Sem Álcool Branca Non-alcoholic Lager (0.5% Vol) introduced in 2003
- Coral Sem Álcool Tónica Non-alcoholic Stout (0.5% Vol) introduced in 2003
- Zarco Lager (4.5% Vol)

=== Others ===
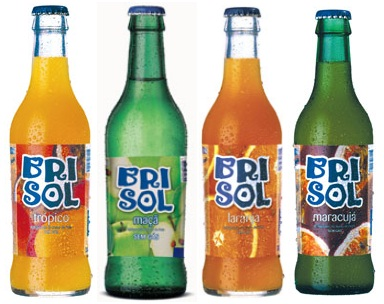
Brisa non-carbonated drinks

- Laranjada
- Atlântida sem gás
- Atlântida com gás
- Atlântida limão

== History ==
1872 - “H.P Miles & Cia" is created to produce Beer and soft drinks in Madeira
1922 - “Araújo, Tavares e Passos" is created for the same purpose
1934 - “H.P Miles & Cia” and “Araújo, Tavares e Passos” merge into 1 company called Empresa de Cervejas da Madeira
1999 - The Pestana Group in partnership with the Miles family, founders of the beer industry in Madeira, purchased the shares of Central de Cervejas in E.C.M. gaining absolute control of the company with a 68% controlling interest.
