= Pestana Hotel Group =

Portuguese tourism and leisure group

- Type: Hotel Group
- Industry: Hospitality
- Founded: 1972
- Founders: José Pestana and Manuel Pestana
- Headquarters: Funchal, Portugal
- Number of locations: +100
- Key people: President - Dionísio Pestana; CEO - José Theotónio
- Products: Hotels
- Revenue: 651,5 M€ (2024) ; 681,9 M€ (2025)
- Net income: 155,6 M€ (2025)
- Parent: Pestana International Holdings S.A.
- Website: pestana.com

Pestana Hotel Group is a multinational group of Portuguese origin in the tourism sector. It operates mainly in the hotel industry, and is also present in industry and services. In 2025 it managed 111 hotel properties in 17 countries, across three continents, with a total of around 12,000 rooms.

Beyond hotels, and with the aim of offering complete and more attractive products, the Group also operates in other business areas: timeshare, tourism real estate, golf and casinos, and it owns the Madeira Brewery.

Hotels are its main business, and the group is described in the press as the largest hotel group with Portuguese capital. Since 2003 it has managed the Pousadas de Portugal network, many of them housed in restored castles, convents and palaces.

It operates the brands Pestana Hotels & Resorts, Pestana Collection Hotels, Pestana Pousadas de Portugal, Pestana CR7 Lifestyle Hotels and Pestana Residences.

== History ==
The Pestana Hotel Group grew out of the vision and determination of Manuel Pestana, a native of Ribeira Brava, in Madeira, who emigrated to South Africa in search of a better life and who, through hard work, discipline and an entrepreneurial spirit, built a solid business career that later allowed him to realise his dream of investing in hotels in his homeland.

It all began in Madeira, where the group opened its first hotel in November 1972, the Pestana Carlton Madeira - with more than 300 rooms, built by Manuel Pestana, founder of the group and father of Dionísio Pestana. After the Revolution of 25 April 1974, the nationalisation of a family property in Maputo cut off a source of income that had sustained the investment in Madeira, and the hotel went through a period of severe financial difficulty. From the vision of Dionísio Pestana, who in 1976 returned from South Africa and took over the leadership of the business, the present-day international group began to take shape. In the 1970s, a pioneering move into timeshare helped to drive the development of the brand.

In the 1990s, investments in tourism real estate and golf enabled the group to establish a base in the Algarve. The first step in internationalisation came in 1998, with the opening of properties in Mozambique - a country connected to the Pestana family history, where the group restored the building that today houses the Pestana Rovuma, in Maputo, and, the following year, with its entry into Brazil through the purchase of the Pestana Rio Atlântica, in Rio de Janeiro.

In 2001 it opened its flagship hotel in Lisbon, the Pestana Palace Hotel & National Monument, the result of the restoration of the Palácio de Valle-Flôr. In 2003 it won the international tender to manage the Pousadas de Portugal chain, doubling the group's portfolio.

Over the first decade of the 21st century, South Africa, Cape Verde, Argentina, São Tomé and Príncipe and Venezuela were added to the group's map. The opening of the Pestana Chelsea Bridge, in London (2010), began an axis of expansion into the European capitals, followed by the Pestana Berlin Tiergarten (2011). In 2012, the group's presence extended to Miami (United States) and Barcelona (Spain), followed by Casablanca (Morocco) in 2013.

In 2015, the Pestana Hotel Group undertook a major rebranding process, reorganising its portfolio into strategic brands and sharpening the clarity of its identity. In the same year the partnership with Cristiano Ronaldo was announced, which would give rise to the Pestana CR7 Lifestyle Hotels brand, widening the Group's presence in the lifestyle and urban segment.

In 2018 the group marked 20 years of presence in Brazil and opened the Pestana Amsterdam Riverside, in Amsterdam; in 2019 the Pestana Plaza Mayor followed, in Madrid. In 2020, the group reached the milestone of 100 hotels worldwide with the opening of the Pestana Park Avenue, in New York.

The year 2021 was marked by the expansion of the Pestana CR7 Lifestyle Hotels brand, resulting from the partnership with Cristiano Ronaldo. On 7 June, the Pestana CR7 Gran Via Madrid opened in soft opening, the brand's first property outside Portugal and the group's second hotel in the Spanish capital, after the Pestana Plaza Mayor. On 7 July the Pestana CR7 Times Square followed, the brand's first hotel in the United States and the group's second property in New York.

The Pestana Hotel Group celebrated its 50th anniversary on 22 November 2022.

In February 2024, the group strengthened its presence in the North American market with the opening of the Pestana Orlando Suites Lake Buena Vista, in the state of Florida, the group's fourth hotel in the United States and the chain's 109th property.

In 2025, the group entered two new European markets, Belgium and Italy, with the acquisition of the future Pestana Brussels Schuman, in Brussels, and of Le Massif Hotel & Lodge, in Courmayeur, Italy, described as the group's first mountain hotel. Both properties began operating under the group's management in 2026. In addition, a Pestana CR7 Lifestyle Hotels property is under construction in Paris, with opening scheduled for 2027.

== Leadership and founders ==
Manuel Pestana, a native of Ribeira Brava, Madeira, emigrated to South Africa as a young man, where he built up business activity. In 1966 he acquired the Hotel Atlântico in Funchal; after the demolition of the existing property, he began building a new hotel in 1968, and the property - today the Pestana Carlton Madeira - was inaugurated in 1972, initially managed by the Sheraton chain.

Dionísio Pestana, son of the founder, was born in Johannesburg in 1952 and graduated in Business Economics from the University of Natal. He moved to Madeira in 1976 and took over the leadership of the group, driving its international expansion and its diversification into tourism real estate, casinos, golf and the brewing industry. The Portuguese business press describes him as one of the defining figures of the country's tourism sector.

== Corporate structure ==
The group's top holding company is Pestana International Holdings S.A., wholly owned by Dionísio Pestana. The group is organised into five regional sub-holdings: Grupo Pestana, S.G.P.S., S.A. (Portugal); Hotéis do Atlântico, S.A. (Europe and North America); Pestana CR7 Holding, S.A.; Pestana Inversiones (South America); and Salvintur, S.A. (Africa); together with Pestana Management, S.A. (shared services). Day-to-day management is delegated to an executive committee.

== Internationalisation and presence in Africa ==
Internationalisation began in 1998 in Mozambique, followed by Brazil in 1999. In Africa, besides Mozambique, the group consolidated a presence in São Tomé and Príncipe, Cape Verde and Morocco. In São Tomé it opened the Pestana São Tomé in 2008, described as the country's first five-star hotel, with a casino. The connection to Africa relates to the family's own history and has been reinforced by international distinctions at the World Travel Awards.

== Geographical presence ==
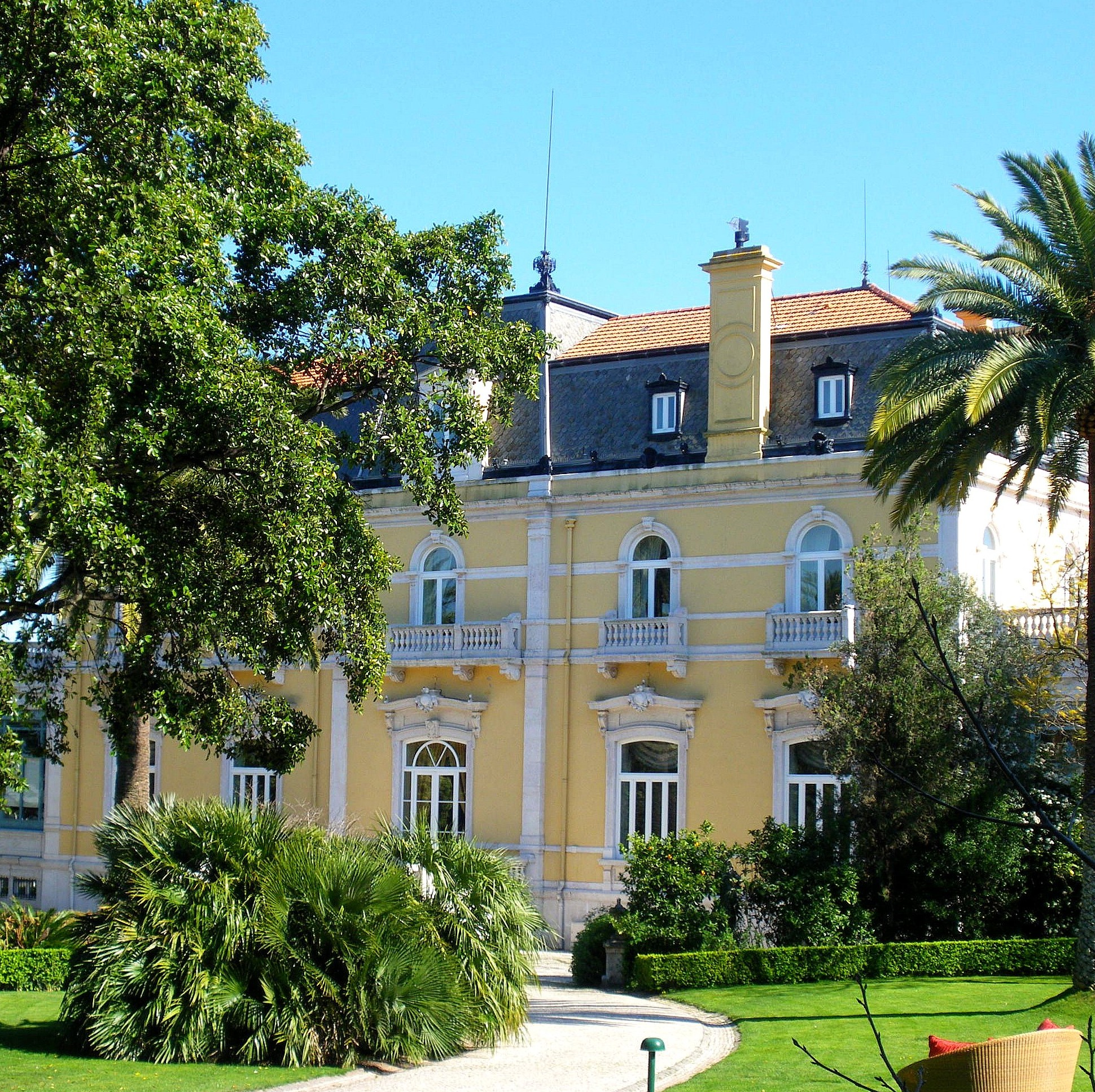
Pestana Palace in Lisbon is a five-star hotel housed in a historic monument.

In 2026 the group was present in 17 countries, across three continents. In Europe it operates in Portugal - its largest market, including Madeira, the Algarve, Lisbon and Porto - and also in Spain, the United Kingdom, Germany, the Netherlands, Belgium and Italy. In the Americas it is present in the United States (New York, Miami and Orlando), Brazil, Argentina and Venezuela. In Africa it operates in Mozambique, Cape Verde, São Tomé and Príncipe and Morocco.

Continent	Countries (hotel presence)
Europe	Portugal, Spain, United Kingdom, Germany, Netherlands, Belgium, Italy
Americas	United States, Brazil, Argentina, Venezuela
Africa	Mozambique, Cape Verde, São Tomé and Príncipe, Morocco

== Pestana CR7 Lifestyle Hotels brand ==
In 2015, the Pestana Hotel Group and the footballer Cristiano Ronaldo established a partnership, held in equal shares, which gave rise to the Pestana CR7 Lifestyle Hotels brand, with operational management by the group. The launch plan initially provided for four hotels in Funchal, Lisbon, Madrid and New York, with an announced investment of around €70 million and approximately 500 rooms. The first property, the Pestana CR7 Funchal, opened in 2016. The brand then evolved beyond the project initially envisaged, extending its international presence to Marrakesh, in Morocco, and, in future, to Paris, reinforcing the partnership's global expansion strategy. The brand currently has five properties and 650 rooms.

== Performance and size ==
In 2024 the group recorded consolidated revenue of €651.5 million (+17% on 2023) and growth of 33% in EBITDA. Hotels accounted for around 65% of revenue, real estate (Pestana Residences) around 19% and the remaining activities - including the Pestana Vacation Club, golf and the Madeira Brewery - the remaining 16%.

In 2025 the group entered the global top 100 in hospitality in the annual ranking by HOTELS magazine, in 96th place, the only Portuguese operator among the 100 largest in the world.

== Awards and distinctions ==
The group has a recurring presence at the World Travel Awards, described in the press as the "Oscars of tourism". In 2025 it won four continental distinctions, including the Pestana CR7 Gran Vía Madrid ("Spain's Leading Boutique Hotel"), the Pestana CR7 Times Square ("North America's Leading Lifestyle Hotel"), the Pestana São Tomé (best hotel in São Tomé and Príncipe) and the Pestana CR7 Marrakech (best hotel in Morocco). In 2026 it gathered 38 nominations across the World Travel Awards and the World Golf Awards, including a nomination for "Europe's Leading Hotel Brand".

== Sustainability and ESG ==
The Pestana Group's sustainability strategy is based on the Pestana Planet Guest programme, with the strapline “we are only guests of the Planet”, which was launched in 2009 and is structured around six pillars of action: education and culture, support for local communities, heritage preservation, respect for the environment, support for entrepreneurship projects and internal social responsibility.

The programme addresses environmental, social and governance (ESG) objectives and promotes initiatives relating to energy efficiency and decarbonisation, efficient water management, waste reduction and recovery and the circular economy, biodiversity protection, the improvement of workers' living conditions, good governance and the development of local communities.

As part of the decarbonisation of its hotel activity, the group has been investing in energy efficiency and renewable energy projects, including photovoltaic systems and other solutions intended to reduce dependence on fossil fuels. In parallel, it implements measures for efficient water management, the reuse of resources and waste reduction across its hotel properties. Between 2019 and 2025, it cut greenhouse gas emissions per occupied room by around 40% in scopes 1 and 2. In recent years, it has announced investments of around €16 million in sustainability and energy transition initiatives at its hotel properties.

Sustainability has likewise been integrated into the group's financing policy. In 2019, the Pestana Hotel Group issued a €60 million Green Bond, described as the first green bond in the hotel sector. In 2025, it went ahead with a Sustainability-Linked Bond, tying part of the cost of the financing to the achievement of measurable environmental targets.

Also in fulfillment of its sustainability policies, concrete procedures for inclusion, equity and the improvement of workers' living conditions have been adopted, and projects have been developed on its own or in partnership with many dozens of local community organisations in the areas of education, health and inclusion as well as quality of life.

As a result of its activities, the Pestana Hotel Group has received various distinctions relating to sustainability and responsible tourism. In 2023, the Pestana hotels and pousadas received 58 Green Key certifications in Portugal. In 2025, the certification was extended for the first time to properties in Spain, including the Pestana Plaza Mayor Madrid, the Pestana CR7 Gran Vía Madrid and the Pestana Arena Barcelona. The Green Key certification, awarded by the Foundation for Environmental Education (FEE), recognises tourism establishments that adopt good environmental management and social responsibility practices.

The Pestana Hotel Group regularly publishes Sustainability Reports prepared in accordance with the Global Reporting Initiative (GRI) standards, and has been progressively aligning its reporting model with the Corporate Sustainability Reporting Directive (CSRD) and the European Sustainability Reporting Standards (ESRS).

== Loyalty programme ==
The group operates the Pestana Guest Club loyalty programme, relaunched in March 2026 with a new five-tier model: three base tiers - Bronze, Silver and Gold - awarded according to the number of nights per year, and two additional tiers - Corporate, for employees of partner companies, and Diamond, for exclusive members, including owners of Pestana Residences properties and Pestana Vacation Club customers. The programme covers more than 100 of the group's hotels and pousadas.
