= Heilmann =

Heilmann is a German language surname. It can be tracked to early 16th-century Protestant families in south-west Germany (various locations); In France, it has spread around 1545 to Mulhouse (Mülhausen in German), a city now in the Alsace region.

Members of the Heilmann family of Mulhouse, of Protestant faith, issued from Lorentz Heilmann, a cooper, common ancestor born in 1545 in Niedernhall (now in Germany) and having established himself in Mulhouse:

- Jean-Gaspard Heilmann (c. 1718 – 1760), French painter
- Nicolas Heilmann, Burgmeister (mayor) of Mulhouse from 1753 to 1766
- Josué Heilmann (1796–1848), inventor, in particular of a hand embroidery machine
- Jean-Jacques Heilmann (1822–1859), early photographer and cofounder of the Société Française de Photographie.
- Jean-Jacques Heilmann (1853–1922), inventor of the Heilmann locomotive "La Fusée Electrique", one of the first electric locomotives

Members of the Heilmann family initially from Geiselbach, who co-founded the Heilmann & Littmann German building company:

- Jakob Heilmann (1846–1927), co-founder of the company
- Otto Heilmann (1888–1945), German architect
- Albert Heilmann (1869–1949), German architect
- Mary Heilmann (1940–2026), American artist

Other people bearing this name:

In Germany:

- Pr Sebastian Heilmann (b.1965), German political scientist and sinologist.
- Lutz Heilmann (b. 1966), German politician (Die Linke) and member of the German Parliament for Schleswig-Holstein
- Thomas Heilmann (b. 1964), German politician (CDU)

In other countries than France and Germany:

- Gerhard Heilmann, Danish artist and paleontologist
- Harry Heilmann, American baseball player [issued from a 17th-century "Heylmann" ancestor from South-West Germany]
- Joe Heilmann (1931-2010), American golfer [German ancestry, born Chicago, IL]
- David Heilmann, Attorney and Mayor of Oak Lawn, Illinois [German ancestry, born Oak Lawn, IL to Joe Heilmann above]
- Birgir Óskar Heilmann Bjarnason (b. 1993), Icelandic businessman and philanthropist [German ancestry, born Reykjavík, Iceland]

== See also ==
- Heilman
