= Hofbräu =

Hofbräu is a German term meaning "royal brewer". It may refer to:

== Breweries ==
- Cölner Hofbräu Früh, a brewery in Cologne
- Staatliches Hofbräuhaus in München (Hofbräu München), a brewery in Munich
  - Hofbräu-Festzelt, the largest beer tent of the Oktoberfest in Munich
  - Hofbräuhaus am Platzl
- Stuttgarter Hofbräu, a German brewery located in Stuttgart
- Würzburger Hofbräu, a brewery in Würzburg, Germany

== Other ==
- Hofbrau, a style of carvery cuisine prevalent in Northern California and Texas
