= John Heilman (disambiguation) =

John Heilman is an American law school professor and politician who is currently the mayor of West Hollywood, California.

John Heilman may also refer to:

- John Heileman (1872–1940), American professional baseball player
- John Heilemann (born 1966), American journalist and national-affairs analyst
- John B. Heilman (1920–2013), American politician in South Dakota

== See also ==
- Heilman
- Heilmann
