= Kurtheater Bad Kissingen =

Coordinates: 50°11′57″N 10°04′47″E

The Kurtheater Bad Kissingen is a theatre in the spa town Bad Kissingen in Bavaria, Germany.

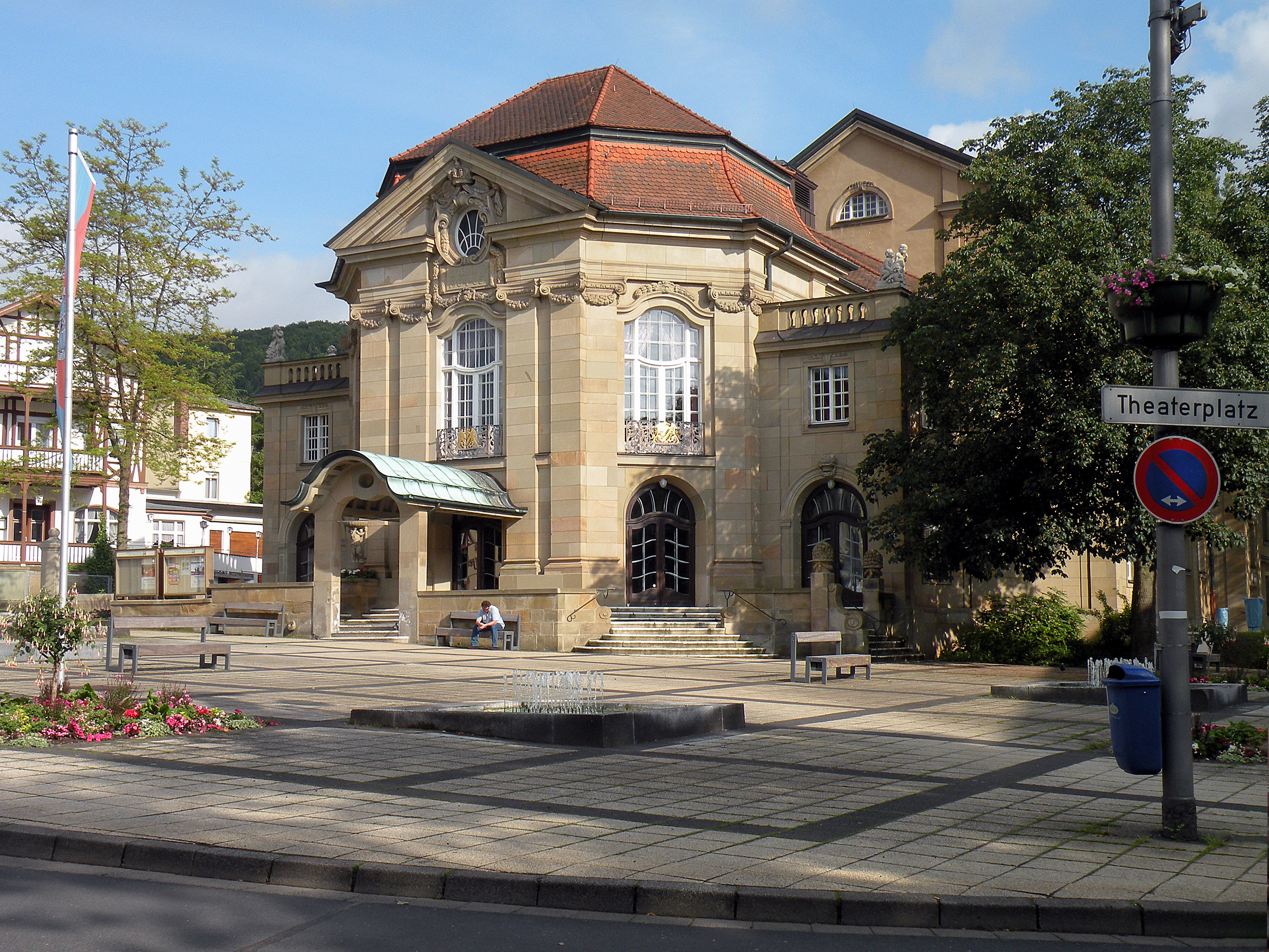
The theatre of Bad Kissingen

== History ==
The theatre was built in 1904 by the Munich architect Max Littmann in the neo baroque style and inaugurated on 25 June 1905 with a performance of the opera Pagliacci of Ruggero Leoncavallo. The theatre with its 538 seats replaced an older wooden theatre building in swiss style of 1856.

The theatre was initially operated by the spa administration (Badkommissariat). The duty of the theatre was to entertain the visitors of the spa. The old theatre had no longer corresponded to the increased demands of the world bath. From 1871 onwards, the theatre was rented to Eduard Reimann, director of the theatre of Würzburg. This made it possible to employ the ensemble of Würzburg during the summer months. After his death in 1898 his son, the actor Otto Reimann, became his successor. Otto Reimann continued his successful performance with his own ensemble in the new theatre. Despite the difficulties of the First World War, inflation, the global economic crisis, or the emergence of national socialism, the theatre business remained at a high level to entertain the spa guests. On the 9th of August, 1941, however, the now 71-year-old Otto Reimann ended his performance in Bad Kissingen with the operetta The Gypsy Baron. Afterwards during the Second World War the theatre was used only sporadically. In 1945 the theatre was confiscatet by the American troops. In 1949 the theatre restarted its operations. But the theatre did not get an own ensemble any more. Now it is dependent on guest performances.

== Literature ==
- Jakob Heilmann, Max Littmann: Das Königliche Theater in Bad Kissingen, Firmenschrift (39 Seiten), Heilmann & Littmann GmbH (Hrsg.), Bruckmann Druck, München 1905
- Georg Dehio: Handbuch der deutschen Kunstdenkmäler: Handbuch der Deutschen Kunstdenkmäler, Bayern I: Franken: Die Regierungsbezirke Oberfranken, Mittelfranken und Unterfranken: BD I, Deutscher Kunstverlag München Berlin, 2., durchgesehene und ergänzte Auflage, 1999, S. 71
- Thomas Ahnert: Bretter, die die Welt bedeuten. Das Kissinger Kurtheater. In: Thomas Ahnert, Peter Weidisch (Hrsg.): 1200 Jahre Bad Kissingen 801-2001. Facetten einer Stadtgeschichte. Sonderpublikation des Stadtarchivs Bad Kissingen, Verlag T. A. Schachenmayer, Bad Kissingen 2001, ISBN 3-929278-16-2, Seite 329f.
- Edi Hahn: Eine Stadtführung. Rotter, Bad Neustadt (Saale) 1991, ISBN 3-925722-04-1, Seite 31f.
- Walter Mahr: Geschichte der Stadt Bad Kissingen. Bad Kissingen 1959
- Adina Christine Rösch: Das Königliche Theater in Bad Kissingen von Max Littmann (1904/05), Magisterarbeit, Nürnberg 2007
- Sigismund von Dobschütz: Die große Bühne zwischen Stuckaturen und Seidentapeten, in: Kulturkalender für den Landkreis Bad Kissingen, Februar-April 2015, S. 7–10
- Werner Eberth: Das Kurtheater im Bade Kissingen, zwei Bände, 2015
