= Hofbräukeller =

Restaurant in Munich, Germany

Coordinates: 48°08′03″N 11°35′42″E

The Hofbräukeller is a restaurant in Haidhausen, Munich, Germany owned by Hofbräuhaus brewery. This restaurant serves the traditional Bavarian cuisine and is less touristy than Hofbräuhaus am Platzl and more popular with the locals. It is a part of the Wiener Platz, home to the Wiener Markt.

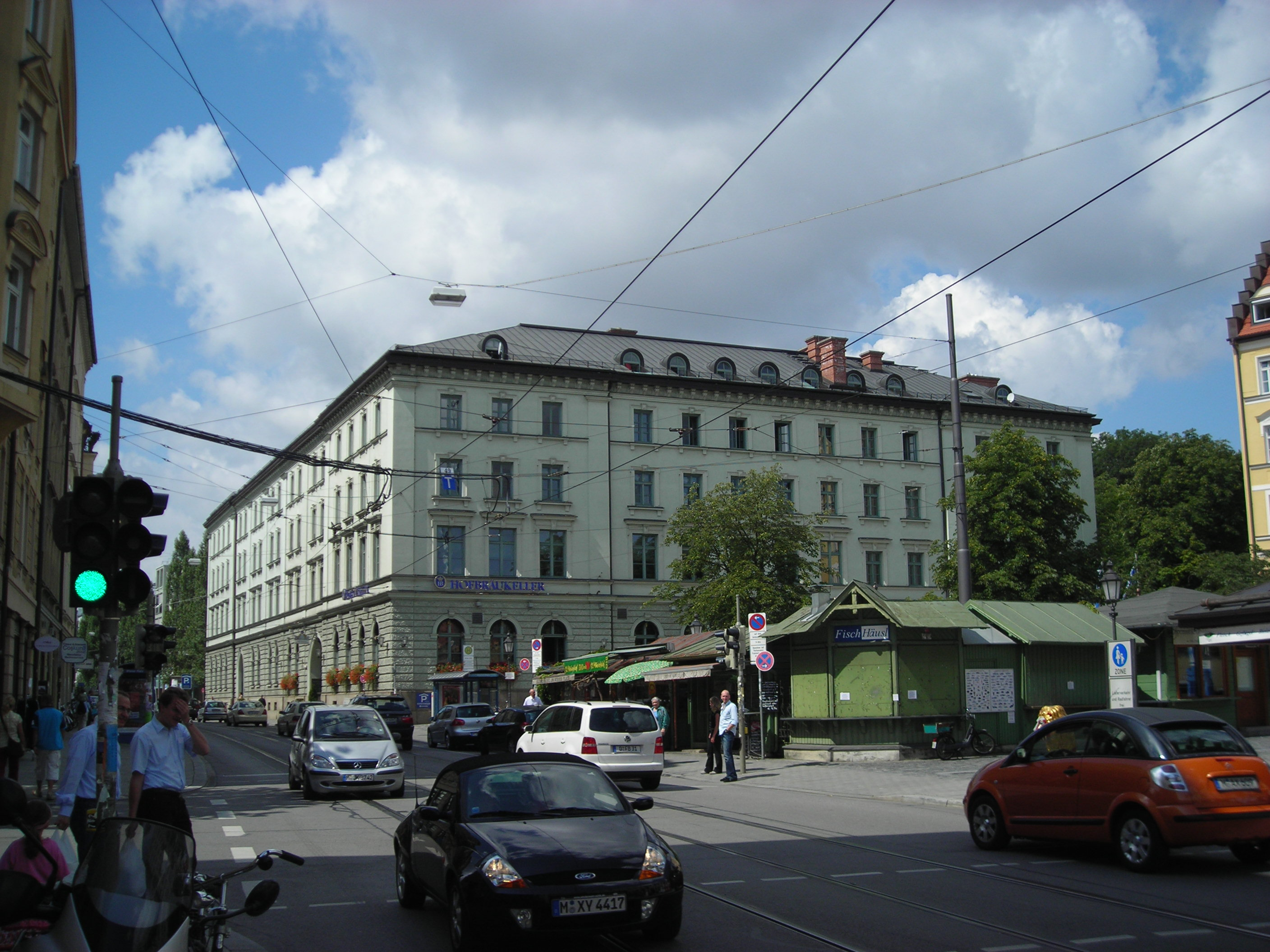

The main floor has two eating rooms and outdoor eating balcony overlooking the beer garden. The underground and first floors have the private function rooms that can be hired for events, lectures, and such. During the warm days, the beer garden is opened with self-service food and drink booths in the back yard.

This restaurant gained the notoriety on 16 October 1919 when Adolf Hitler gave his first political speech as a member of the German Workers' Party (Deutsche Arbeiterpartei, DAP) at the beer hall on the first floor.

== See also ==
- Hofbräu-Festzelt
- Bürgerbräukeller
