= Heinrich Mendelssohn =

German contractor (1881–1959)

Heinrich Mendelssohn (21 February 1881 – 7 August 1959) was a German contractor and real estate developer.

== Early life ==
Mendelssohn was born in Posen, German Empire (today Poznań, Poland) in 1881.

A claimed connection to the family of the famous Jewish philosopher Moses Mendelssohn has not yet been confirmed. He is most likely the father of the British actor Daniel Gerroll, whose mother was Heinrich's paramour from 1949 to 1959.

== Activity ==
Mendelssohn participated in the construction and development of numerous projects located in Berlin, i.e: the Hansaviertel, the Bavarian quarter, the Kurfürstendamm and the Olivaer Platz. He was also behind a development of the skyscraper at the Anhalter Station in Berlin which was named after the Saxon royal family.

In cooperation with Albert Heilmann, Mendelssohn constructed the Europahaus (House of Europe) in Berlin, which today houses the German Federal Ministry for Economic Cooperation and Development.

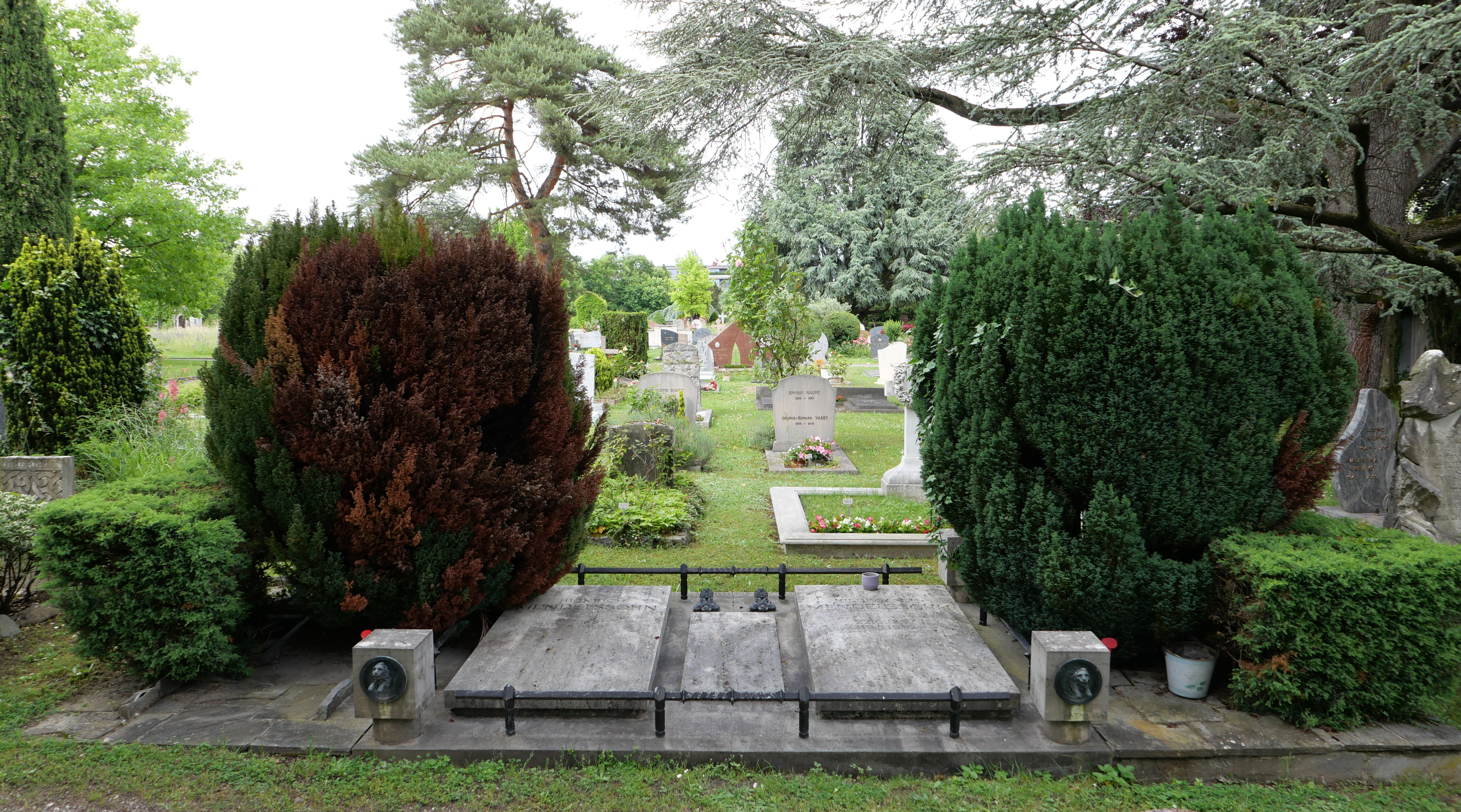
The grave in 2024.

He emigrated to the United Kingdom during the Third Reich and returned to Berlin in 1946.

== Death ==
Mendelssohn died in Geneva, Switzerland in 1959. He found his final resting place at the cemetery of Petit-Saconnex. His wife Hildegarde (1897-1992) was buried at this side.
