= Hailman =

Hailman is a surname. Notable people with this surname include:

- Jack Hailman (1936–2016), American zoologist and ethologist
- Johanna Woodwell Hailman (1871–1958), American painter

== See also ==
- Heilman
