= Reverdy =

Reverdy is a surname and a masculine given name. Notable people with the name include:

- Michèle Reverdy (born 1943), French composer
- Pierre Reverdy (1889–1960), French poet
- Richard Reverdy (1851–1915), German civil engineer
- Thomas B. Reverdy (born 1974), French novelist
- Reverdy Johnson (1796–1876), American politician, defense attorney and jurist
- Reverdy C. Ransom (1861–1959), American Christian socialist, civil rights activist and African Methodist Episcopal Church bishop
