= Albert Heilmann =

German Former Architect and Contractor (1886-1949)

Albert Max Heilmann (1886-1949) was an architect and contractor who worked in Munich and Berlin.

From 1909 to 1929, he was junior boss of his father Jakob Heilmann's construction company, Heilmann & Littmann. Later he became chairman of the board of supervisors of this company, after it had been transformed into a corporation.

He constructed the Europahaus (House of Europe) in Berlin, in which the German Federal Ministry for Economic Cooperation and Development is currently located, in cooperation with the Berlin building tycoon Heinrich Mendelssohn.

== Works ==
- Heilmann, Albert (in German): Das Europa-Haus in Berlin : Ein neuzeitl. Grossbau; Seine Entstehgsgeschichte vom ersten Spatenstich bis zur Vollendg (The Europa-Haus in Berlin. A modern large building. Its history of origin, from its ground-breaking ceremony to its completion) Berlin: Ascher 1931.
