= Heilman =

Heilman is a surname, found in particular in the U.S., either as a variation of the German/Alsacian surname Heilmann belonging to some protestant families in the south-west of Germany, or from other origins ("heilman" seems to be in Poland the surname of some Jewish families, cf. Anna Heilman below).

Notable people with the surname include:

- Aaron Heilman (born 1978), American baseball player
- Anna Heilman (1928–2011), Polish resistance fighter
- Dan Heilman (1922–1966), American comic strip cartoonist
- E. Bruce Heilman, American college and university president
- James Heilman, Canadian physician
- John Heilman, American politician
- John B. Heilman (1920–2013), American politician
- Kenneth Heilman (born 1938), American neurologist
- M. Stephen Heilman (born 1933), American physician and inventor
- Robert B. Heilman (1906–2004), American educator and writer
- Samuel Heilman (born 1946), American sociologist and writer
- Thomas Heilman (born 2007), American swimmer
- William Heilman (1824–1890), American politician
- William Clifford Heilman (1877–1946), American classical composer

== See also ==
- Heilman Glacier, glacier of Antarctica
- Heilman, Indiana, a community in the United States
- Heilmann
