= Max Littmann =

German architect

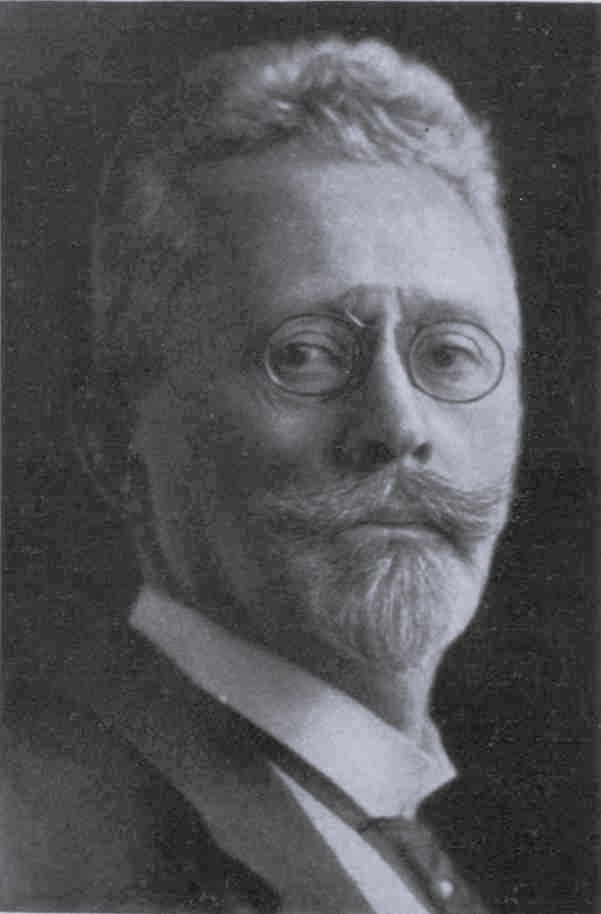
Max Littmann, Portrait 1912

Max Littmann (3 January 1862 - 20 September 1931) was a German architect.

== Education ==
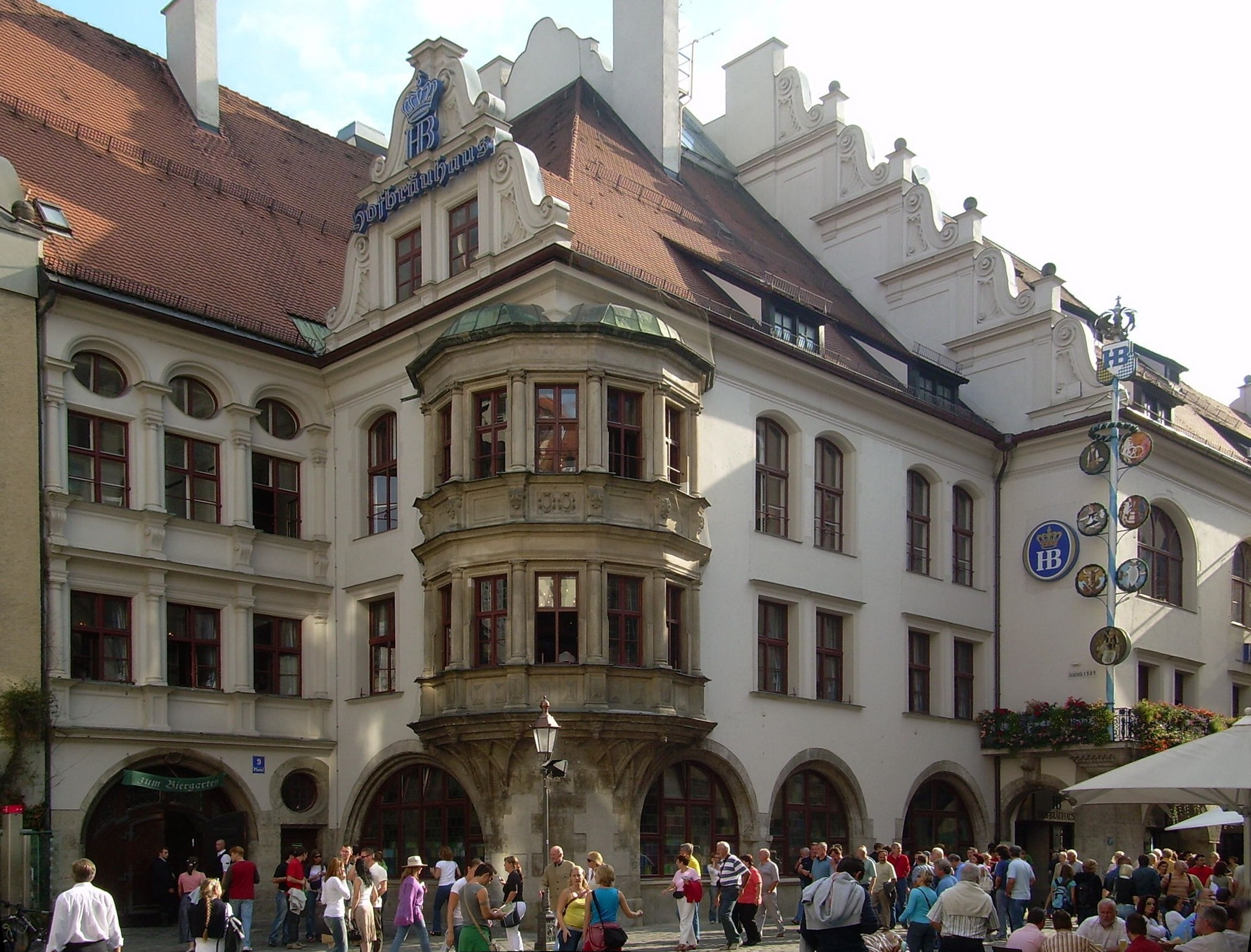
Hofbräuhaus in Munich 1896-1897

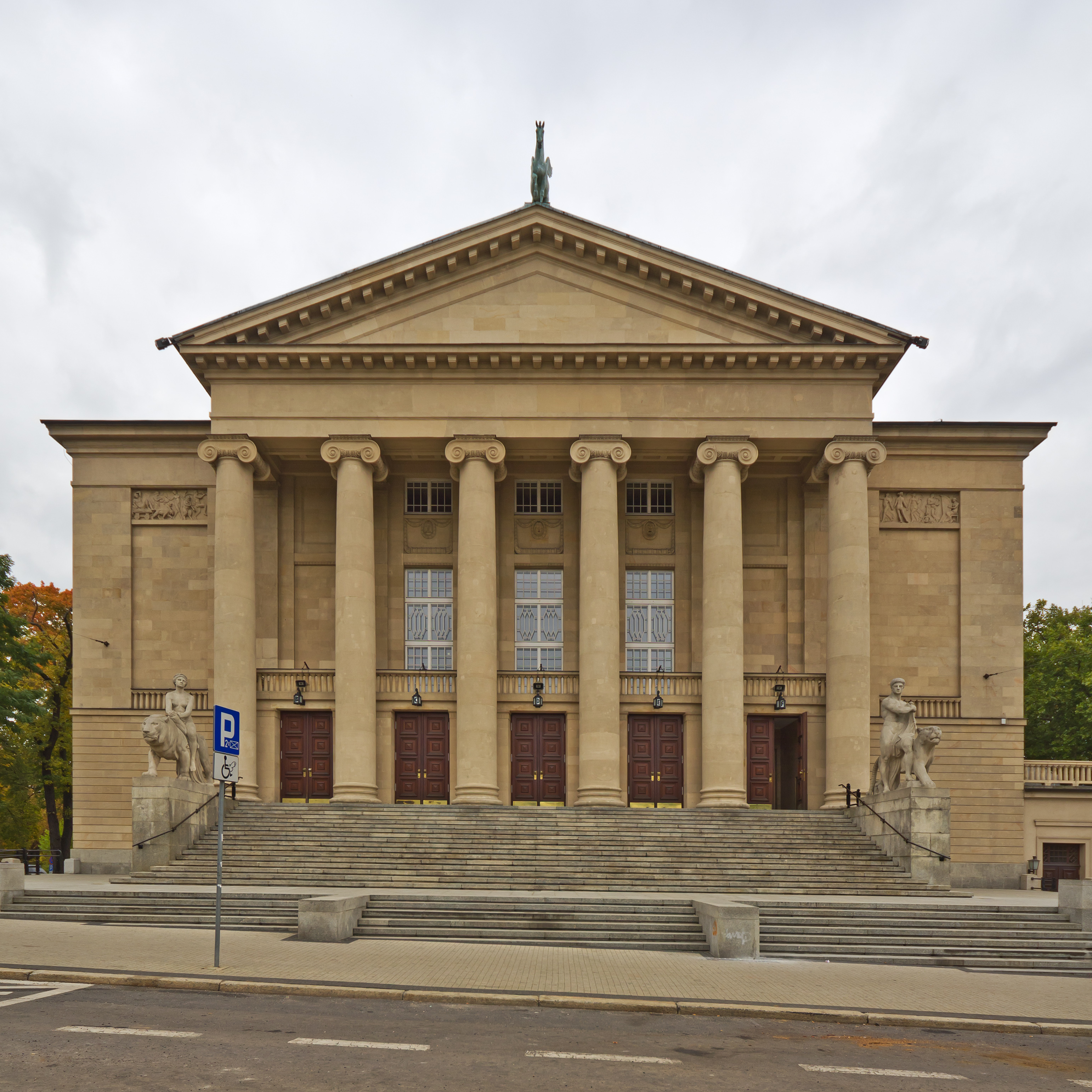
Opera house in Poznań 1909-1910

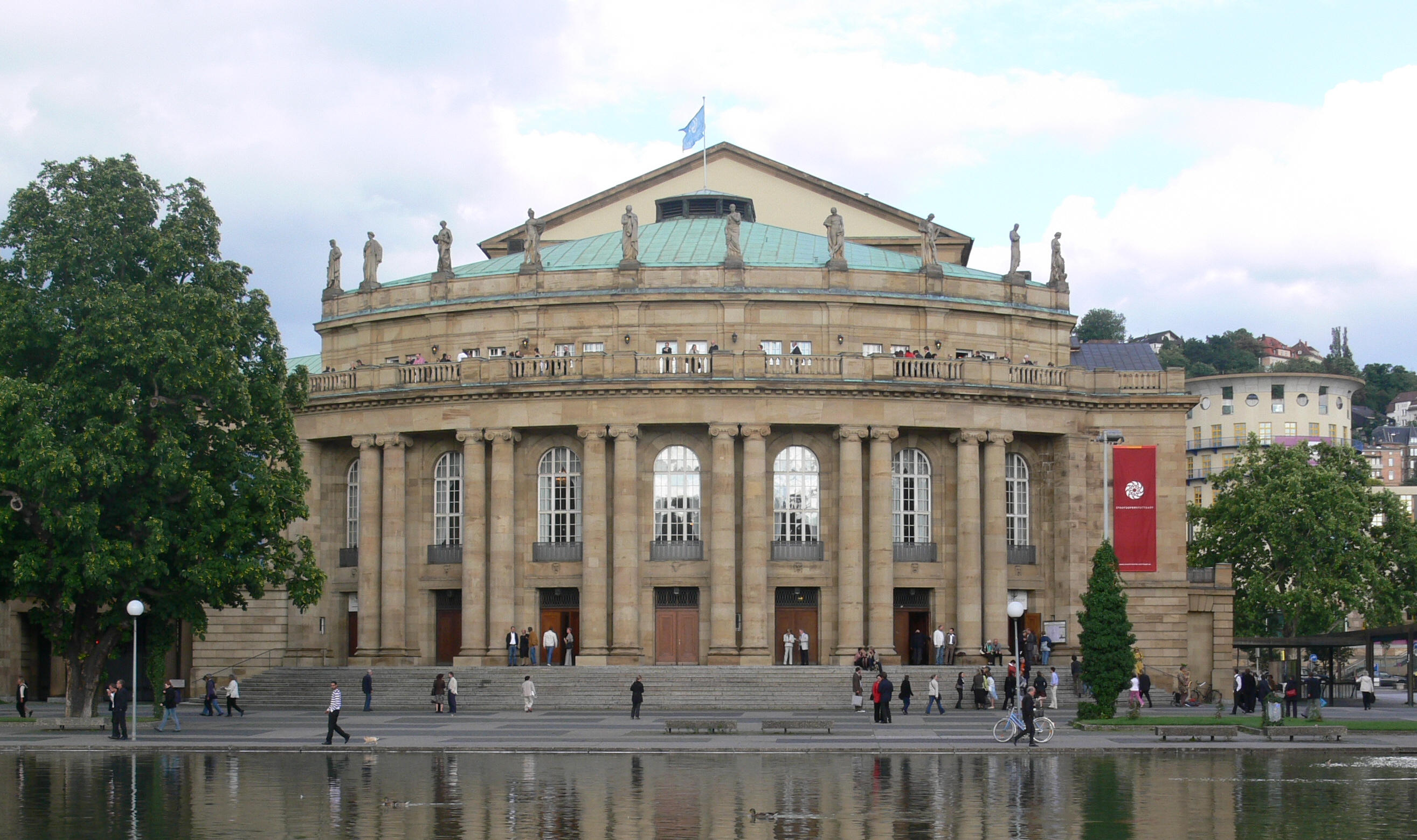
Opera house in Stuttgart 1909-1912

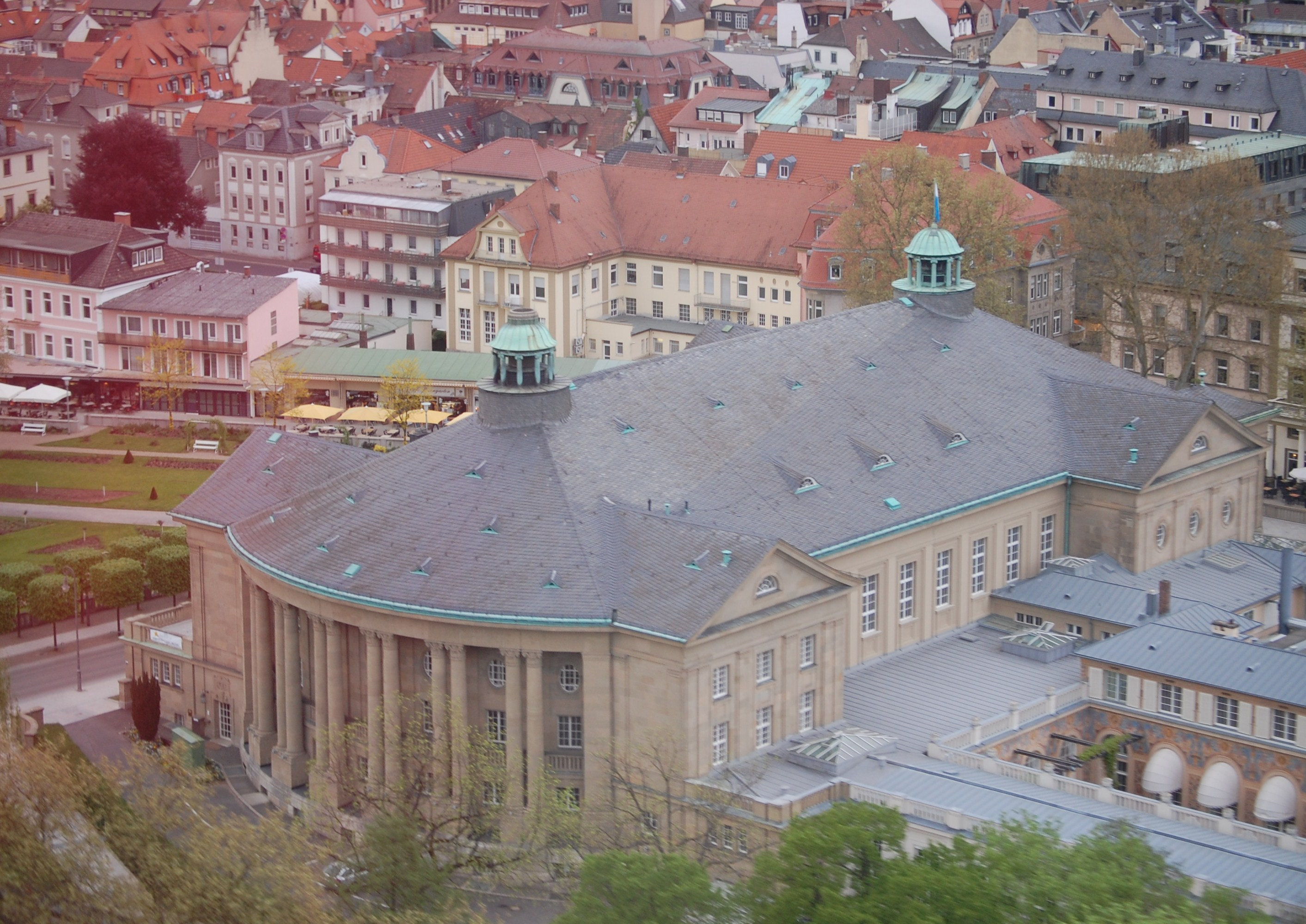
Regentenbau (concert hall) in Bad Kissingen 1910-1913

Littmann was educated in the Chemnitz University of Technology and the Dresden University of Technology. In 1885, he moved to Munich where he met Friedrich Thiersch and Gabriel von Seidl and where - after two study trips to Italy and Paris - he established himself as a free architect.

During his lifetime, Littmann was listed in the Encyclopaedia Judaica. His pedigree doesn't give any clue on his often referenced Jewish descent; rather, he is descended from a Protestant family in Oschatz (Saxony), which can be traced back for centuries.

== Career ==
In 1891, he joined the contracting business of his father-in-law Jakob Heilmann, thus transforming it into the Heilmann & Littmann general partnership (later becoming a limited partnership), taking charge of the planning department. Littmann excelled in the erection of magnificent buildings, e.g. theaters, department stores and spas and was the perfect supplement to Heilmann, who had specialized in living house construction.

In February 1905, two department stores opened their doors in Munich, both designed by Littmann, who at that time had already achieved the status of a prominent architect in the city. The Kaufhaus Oberpollinger and the Warenhaus Hermann Tietz were both prominently positioned in central Munich near the München Hauptbahnhof (Munich Central Train Station). Littmann designed both department stores so that the exteriors were historicist, while the interiors provided consumers with a modern shopping environment. Littmann arranged both department stores around an atrium with a glass and iron cupola. Littmann also insisted on state of the art building techniques, such as reinforcing steel, and reinforced concrete. Littmann hired renowned Munich artists to help with the design of the two department stores, including Heinrich Düll, Georg Pezold, and Julius Seidl.

== Buildings (selection) ==
- 1896-1897 Hofbräuhaus in Munich
- 1898-1900 Kurhaus (spa building) in Bad Reichenhall
- 1900-1901 Prinzregententheater in Munich
- 1904-1905 Kurtheater in Bad Kissingen
- 1905-1906 Schillertheater in Berlin
- 1906-1907 Deutsches Nationaltheater in Weimar
- 1907-1908 Münchner Künstler-Theater in Munich
- 1909–1912 Königlich Württembergisches Hoftheater in Stuttgart (opera house)
- 1910-1913 Regentenbau (concert hall) and Wandelhalle (spa building) in Bad Kissingen
- 1926-1927 Kurhausbad (spa building) in Bad Kissingen

== Publications ==
- Littmann, Max: Das Charlottenburger Schiller-Theater. München: Bruckmann [ca. 1906].
- Littmann, Max: Das Münchner Künstlertheater. München: Werner 1908.
- Littmann, Max: Das Großherzogliche Hoftheater in Weimar. Denkschrift zur Feier der Eröffnung. München: Werner 1908.
- Littmann, Max: Die Königlichen Hoftheater in Stuttgart. Darmstadt: Koch 1912.
