= In München steht ein Hofbräuhaus =

German drinking song

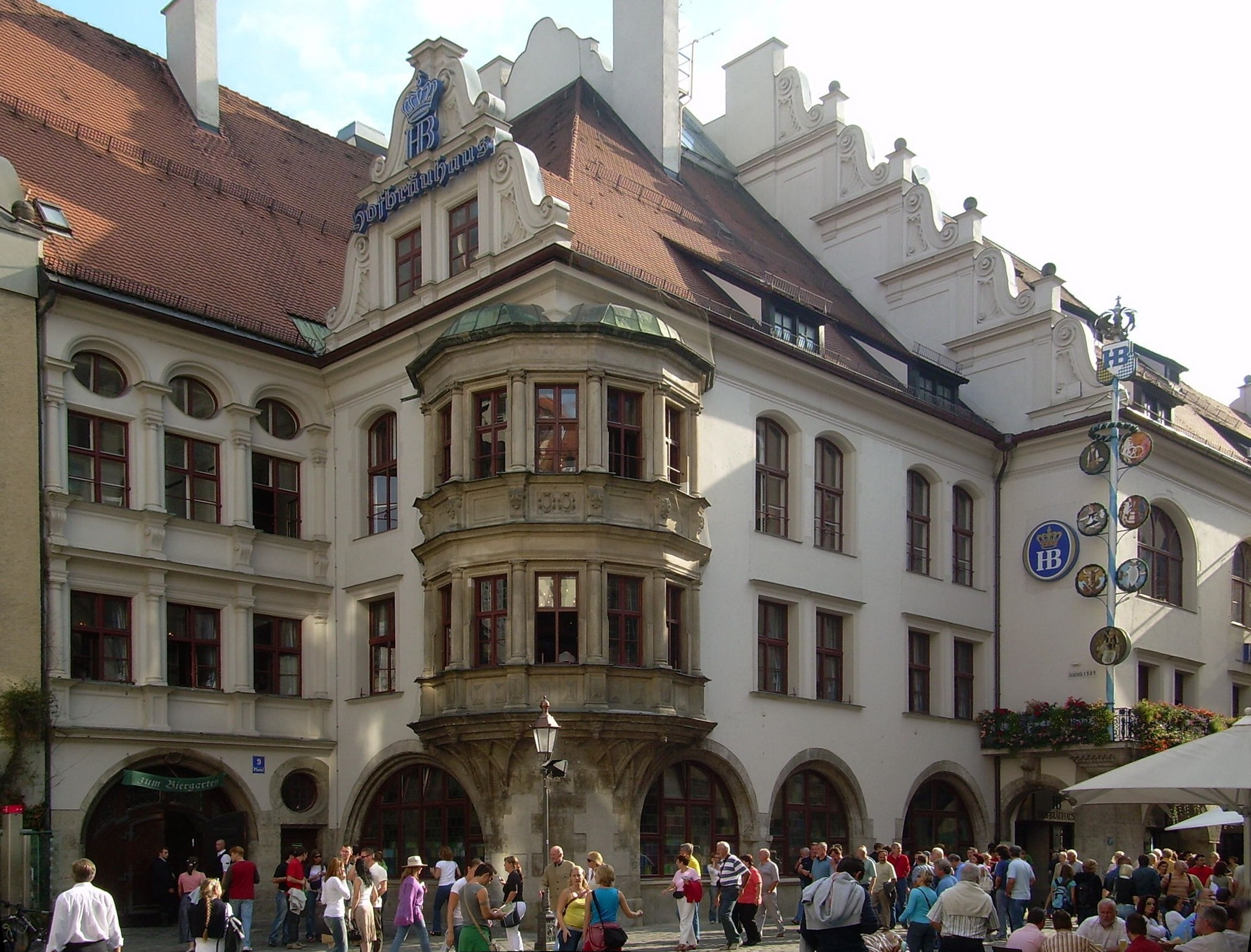
Northern facade of the Hofbräuhaus am Platzl.

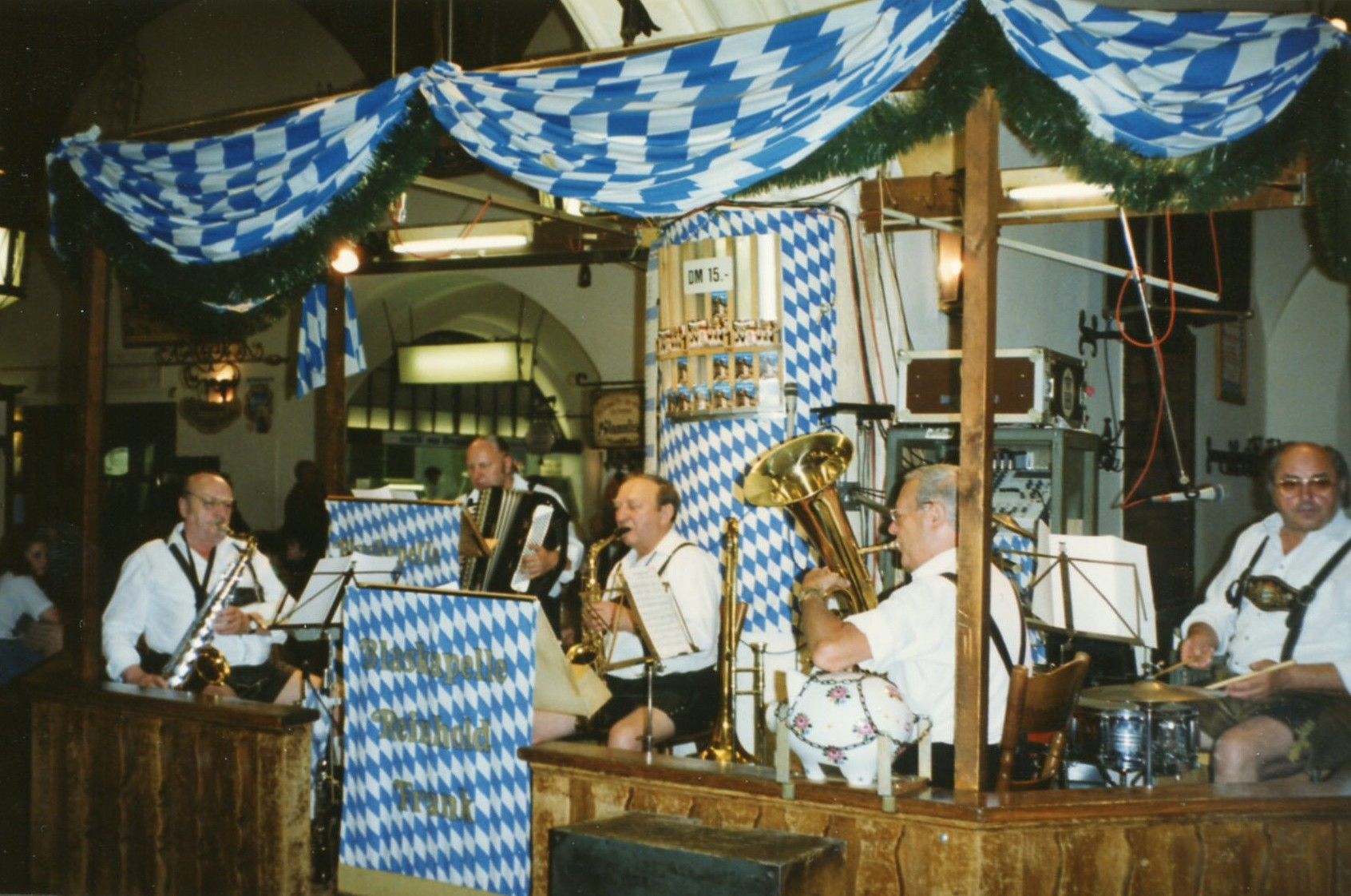
A band performing at the Hofbräuhaus.

"In München steht ein Hofbräuhaus" (German for "There's a Hofbräuhaus in Munich") is the title of the Hofbräuhaus-Lied ("Hofbräuhaus song") composed in 1935, which is today one of the best known drinking songs throughout the world. The refrain of the schlager song goes: "In München steht ein Hofbräuhaus - oans, zwoa, g'suffa", Bavarian dialect German for "There's a Hofbräuhaus in Munich - one, two, let's drink!".

The song was composed by Wilhelm "Wiga" Gabriel from Berlin (1897–1964). According to legend, Gabriel found the melody to the text written by his friend Klaus Siegfried from Bad Hindelang in the Café am Zoo in Berlin. As the composer did not have any paper at hand, he wrote the notes on the title page of the Berliner Illustrierten newspaper. The start of the melody resembles the Munich city hymn Solang der alte Peter. Gabriel is said to have resorted to this folk song for the melody. The Hofbräuhaus song, musically a waltz, was first performed at the Wurstmarkt in Bad Dürkheim in 1936. It developed to a carnival melody at the carnival time in the next year and found its way to the Hofbräuhaus, where Gabriel conducted it himself and was rewarded with a giant mug of beer.

Famous interpreters of the melody include Maxl Graf and Franzl Lang.

The song serves as the score to a 1953 comedy film about an inheritance dispute between a family from Munich and a family from Berlin during Oktoberfest. The film is named In München steht ein Hofbräuhaus after the refrain of the song. The film was written by the Austrian actors Rolf Olsen and Siegfried Breuer. Olsen appears in the film himself, while Breuer acted as the director.

The song was also cited in a song by the Munich band Spider Murphy Gang. The band's 1981 number one single Skandal im Sperrbezirk starts with the words In München steht ein Hobräuhaus - doch Freudenhäuser müssen 'raus ("There's a Hobräuhaus in Munich - but the brothels have to go"). The song, viewed as provocative at the time, makes ironic remarks towards prostitution and double standards in business. Despite several radio stations boycotting the song it sold 750 thousand copies and brought the band fame throughout Germany.

== Literature ==
- Walter, Eimar: Musik im berühmtesten Wirtshaus der Welt. Musik im Hofbräuhaus. In: Moser, Johannes; Becher, Eva (ed.): München-Sound: urbane Volkskultur und populäre Musik, Herbert Utz Verlag, Munich 2011, ISBN 978-3-8316-4035-5, pp. 79-87, limited preview at Google Books.
