= Daniel Gerroll =

British actor

- Born: 16 October 1951 (age 74); London, England
- Occupation: Actor
- Years active: 1975–present
- Spouse: Patricia Kalember (m. 1986)
- Children: 3

Daniel Gerroll (born 16 October 1951) is an English theatre, television and film actor.

== Life and career ==
Gerroll was born in London, the son of Kathleen Cordelia (née Norman), a fashion model, and Harry Gerroll, a clothing designer. Gerroll has appeared on television in both the United Kingdom and the United States, although his greater contribution has been to the stage in both countries. In New York City, he has won the Theatre World Award for The Slab Boys and Knuckle, the Outer Critics Circle Award for Translations and the Village Voice's Obie Award for Sustained Excellence of Performance. His Broadway credits include Plenty, The Homecoming, Enchanted April, High Society, and Misery, and he starred in Roundabout Theatre Company productions of The Knack and On Approval.

Gerroll's television credits include Miami Vice, Burn Notice, Cheers, Knots Landing, Seinfeld, Blue Bloods, Sex and the City, Law & Order and The Starter Wife.

On film Gerroll has appeared in Chariots of Fire, Sir Henry at Rawlinson End, 84 Charing Cross Road, Drop Dead Fred and Big Business. He played Bronson Alcott in scenes from the writer's life in the documentary profile "Louisa May Alcott: The Woman Behind 'Little Women'" that aired on the PBS series America Masters.

A relationship with the Guthrie Theatre in Minneapolis began with his playing Henry Higgins in Pygmalion in 2004. It continued with his creating the role of Scrooge in the Guthrie's updating of the annual tradition and most recently playing Benedick in Much Ado About Nothing.

== Personal life ==
Upon the death of his mother on 23 April 2006, Gerroll discovered he was the biological son of German building tycoon Heinrich Mendelssohn. He has been married to actress Patricia Kalember since 1986 and they have three children together, Becca (b. 1985), Ben (b. 1989) and Sophia (b. 1996).

== Filmography ==
Year	Film	Role	Notes
1980	Sir Henry at Rawlinson End	Ralph Rawlinson	
1981	Chariots of Fire	Henry Stallard	
1987	84 Charing Cross Road	Brian	
1987	Happy New Year	Curator	
1988	Big Business	Chuck	
1991	Drop Dead Fred	Nigel Cronin	
1993	A Far Off Place	John Winslow	
2006	The Namesake	Gerald	
2010	Heterosexuals	Ryan	
2014	The Amazing Spider-Man 2	OsCorp Department Head	
2014	Freedom	Herbert Barton	
2014	Mania Days	Eric Wellman	
2014	Free the Nipple	Boss	
2015	Angelica	Dr. Pinfield-Smith	
2015	Touched with Fire	Dr. Lyon	
2015	Those People	Dick Adler	
2016	Custody	Campbell Fisher	

== Television ==
Year	Film	Role	Notes
1979	Bless Me, Father	Johnny Downes	1 episode (The Heart of a Curate) - Season 2, Episode 4
1982	The Woman in White	Walter Hartrigh	4 episodes
1994	Seinfeld	Simon	1 episode
2010	The Good Wife	Dr. Theo Lawton	1 episode
2011	Burn Notice	Ray Curston	1 episode
2025	Daredevil: Born Again	Arthur Sledge	Episode: "Excessive Force"
