= Jakob Heilmann =

German contractor (1846–1927)

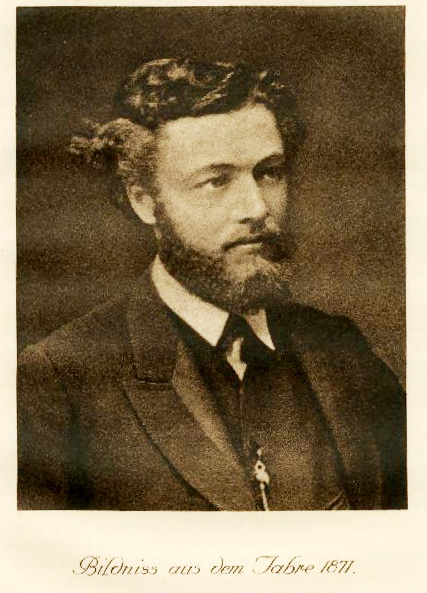
Jakob Heilmann

Jakob Heilmann (21 August 1846 in Geiselbach, Aschaffenburg County (Lower Franconia) – 15 February 1927 in Munich) was a German contractor.

Son of a glazier, Heilmann attended the construction school in Munich and graduated with the exam as a master builder.

Since 1866, he was into railway construction and in 1871 established the builders J. Heilmann in Regensburg. In 1892, his son-in-law, the young architect Professor Max Littmann (1862-1931) joined him, so the construction company of Heilmann & Littmann KG (after 1897 GmbH) came into existence. The real estate business was taken care by the Heilmann'sche Immobilien-Gesellschaft AG and several other related companies.

Heilmann engaged mostly in the building of family homes and mansions, among others in Munich Gern and in Solln-Prinz-Ludwigshöhe.

Magnificent and monumental buildings included the Schackgalerie, the Prinzregententheater, Münchener Neueste Nachrichten, Hofbräuhaus-rebuilding in Munich and several health resort hotels in other parts of Bavaria.

After the partners Littmann and Richard Reverdy left in 1908 und 1909, his sons Albert and Otto joined the construction company..

Furthermore, Jakob Heilmann initiated the founding of the electric power provider Isarwerke GmbH.
