= William Clifford Heilman =

American composer

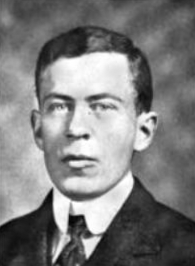
- Born: September 27, 1877; Williamsport, Pennsylvania
- Died: December 20, 1946 (aged 69); Williamsport, Pennsylvania
- Education: Harvard University
- Occupation: Composer

William Clifford Heilman (September 27, 1877 – December 20, 1946) was an American composer.

== Biography ==
William Clifford Heilman was born in Williamsport, Pennsylvania on September 27, 1877. He composed a number of orchestral works as well as a good deal of chamber music; he also produced songs. Heilman was a graduate of Harvard University, where he later taught for some time.

He died in Williamsport on December 20, 1946.
