= Hotel Fürstenhof (Berlin) =

Luxury hotel in Berlin, Germany

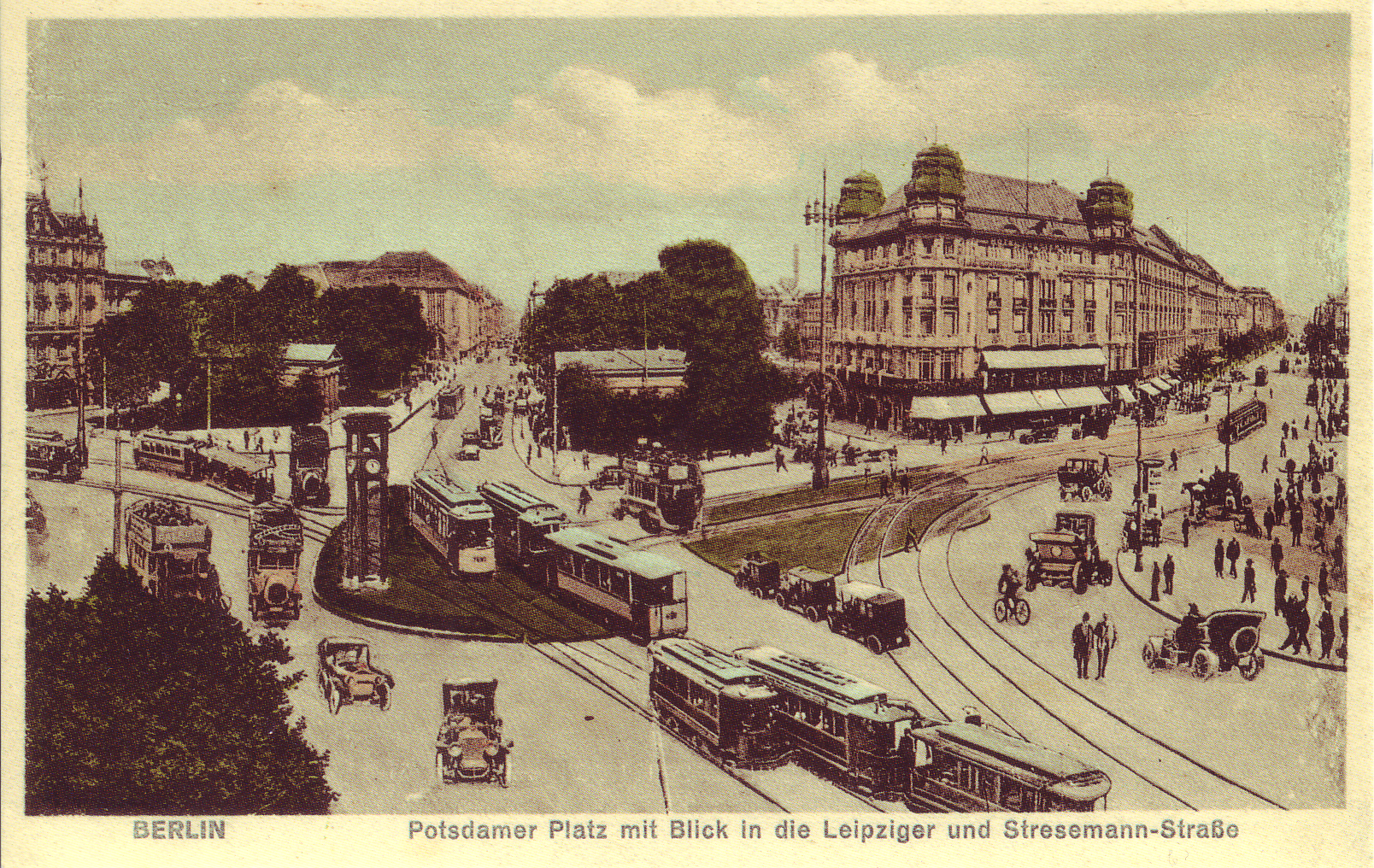

- Location in Berlin

General information
- Architectural style: Neoclassical (before 1906); Art Nouveau (after 1906)
- Location: Potsdamer Platz, Berlin, Germany
- Coordinates: 52°30′31″N 13°22′37″E
- Opening: 1907
- Closed: 1943

Design and construction
- Architects: Richard Bielenberg; Josef Moser

Hotel Fürstenhof was a luxury hotel facing both Leipziger Platz and Potsdamer Platz in Berlin, Germany. It was designed by architects Richard Bielenberg and Josef Moser and opened in 1907. On 22 November 1943 the hotel was destroyed during an air raid on Berlin in World War II; the ruins were completely demolished in the 1950s.

Originally, the hotel was built in the Neoclassical style in the second half of the 19th century. After its renovation, enlargement and reopening in 1907, the architecture of the hotel had elements of Art Nouveau, the onset of Modernism and the Neo-Baroque. The interior of the building was elaborately decorated, including a fountain by Ludwig Mayer and carvings by Richard Kuhn.

== Gallery ==
Hotel Fürstenhof (Berlin)

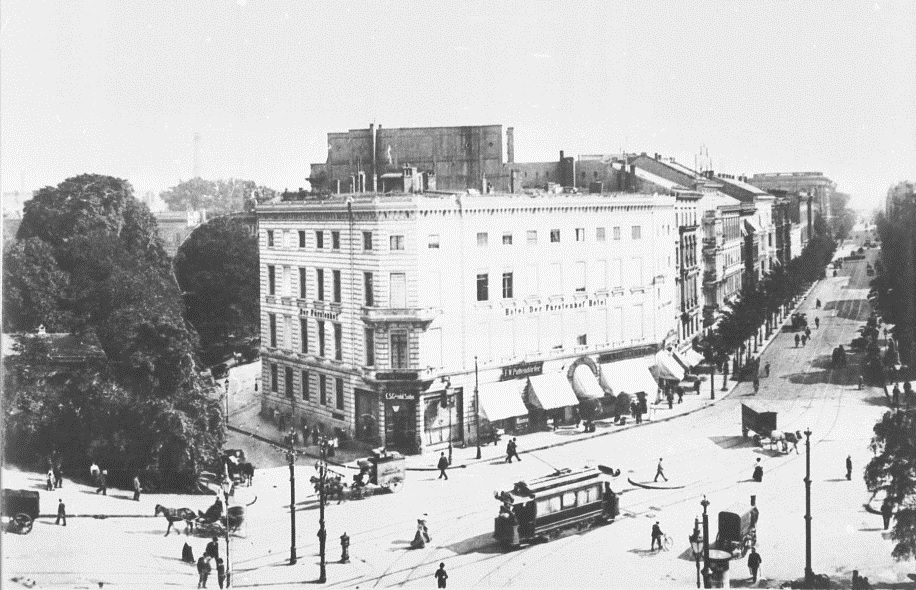
The hotel in 1906, before its renovation

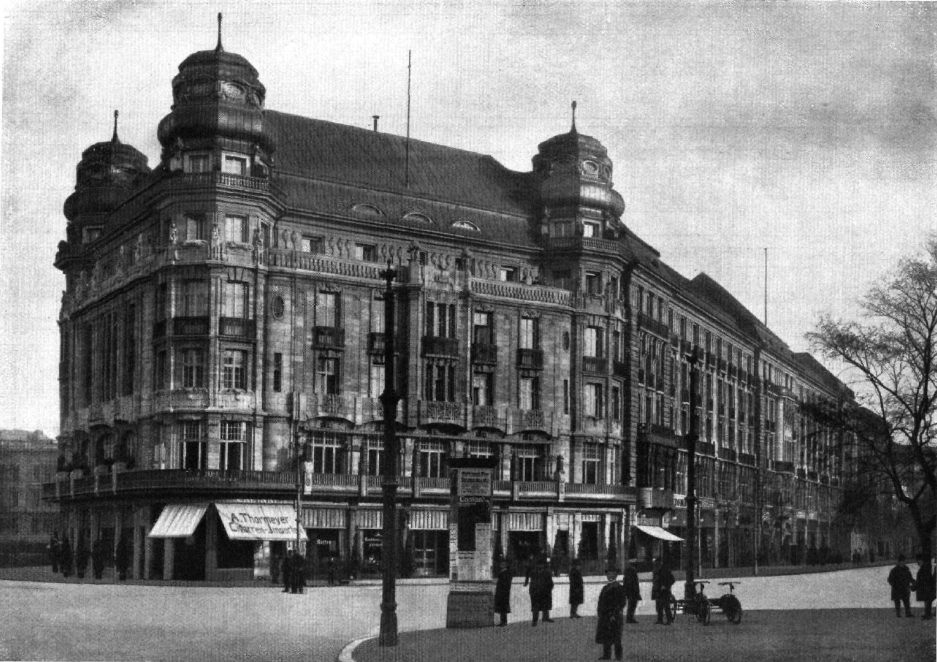
The hotel in 1908, after its renovation

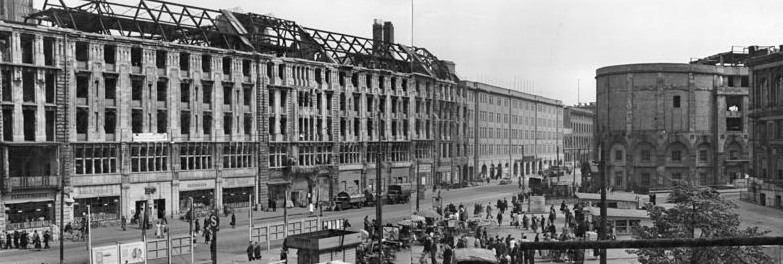
The hotel in ruins, post World War II in 1952

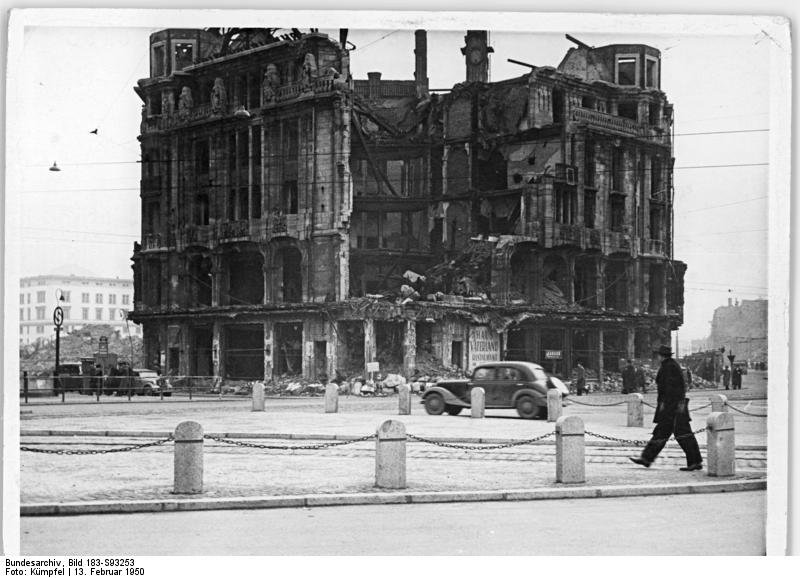
The hotel in ruins, post World War II in 1952

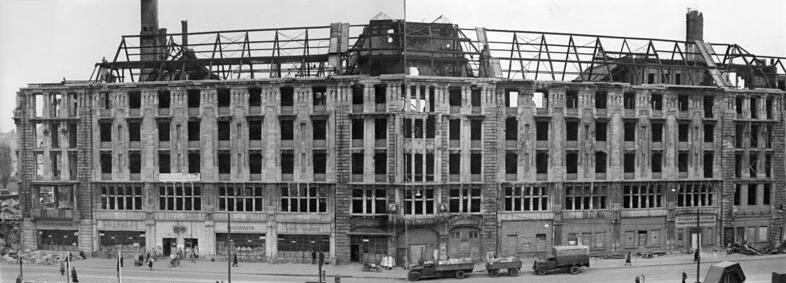
The hotel in ruins, post World War II in 1952
