= Hofbräuhaus am Platzl =

Beer hall in the city center of Munich, Bavaria, Germany

Coordinates: 48°08′15″N 11°34′47″E

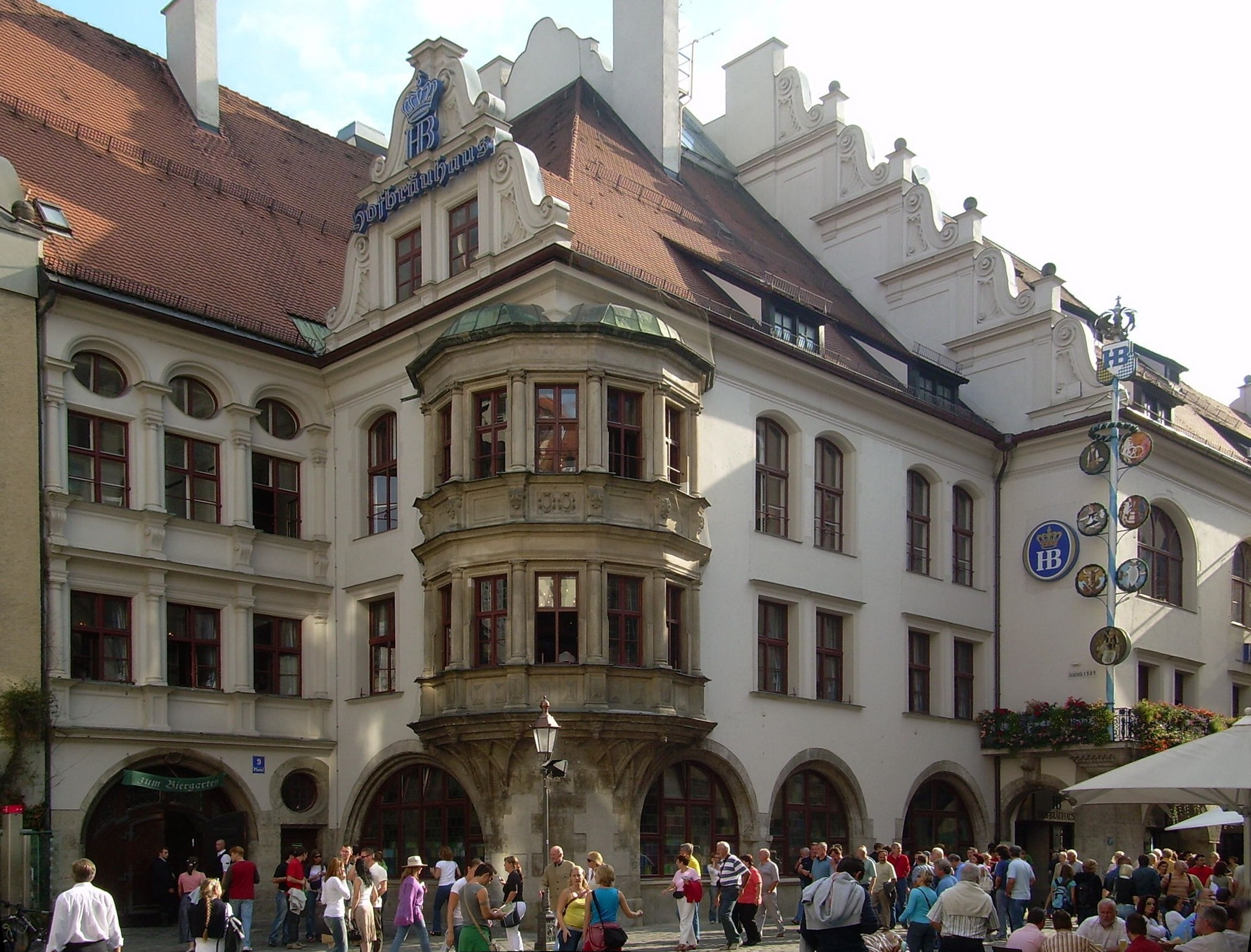
Hofbräuhaus am Platzl, Munich

Staff wear Tracht with men in Lederhosen and women in Dirndl

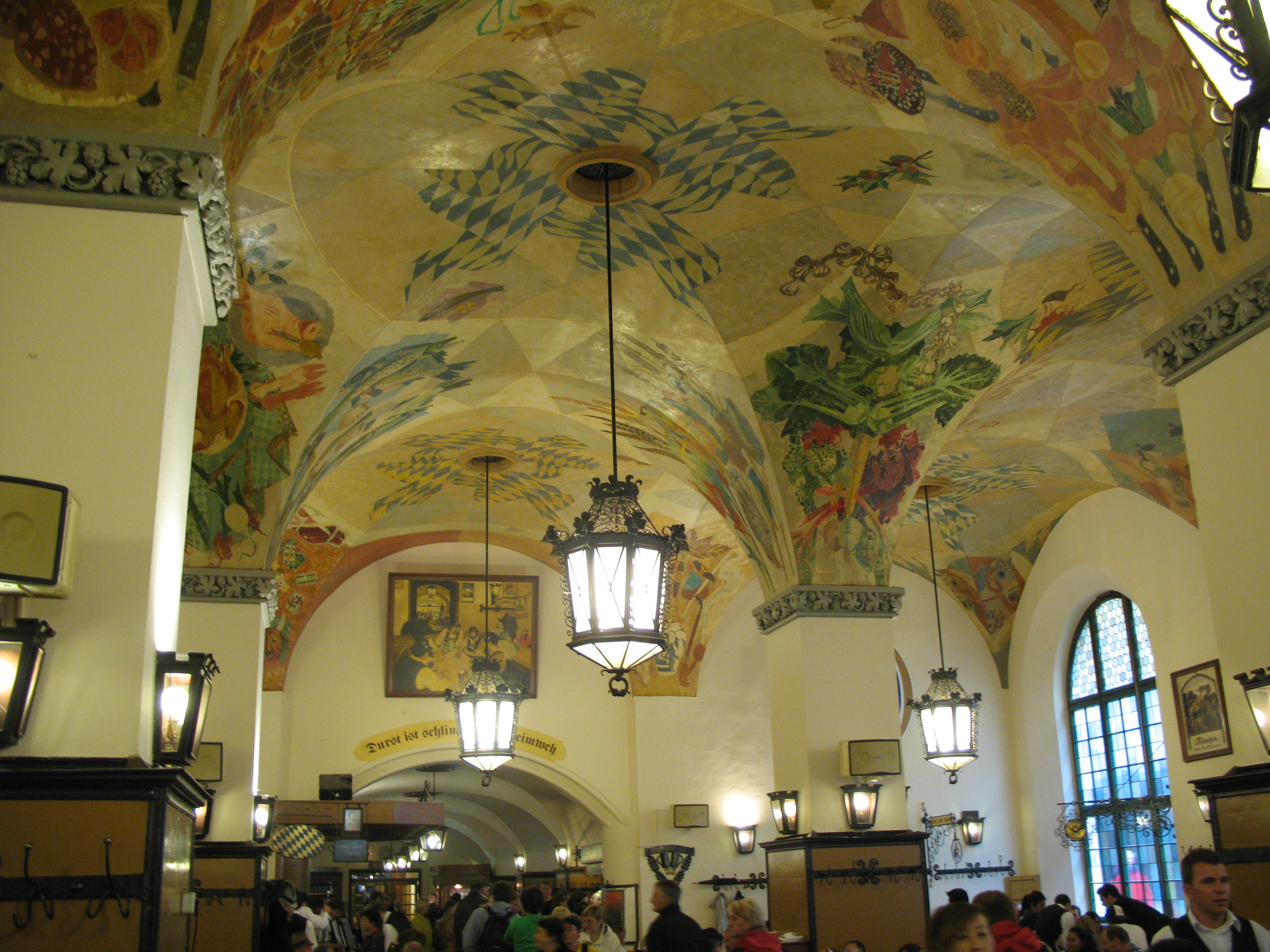
The ceiling features elaborate frescoes in the baroque style.

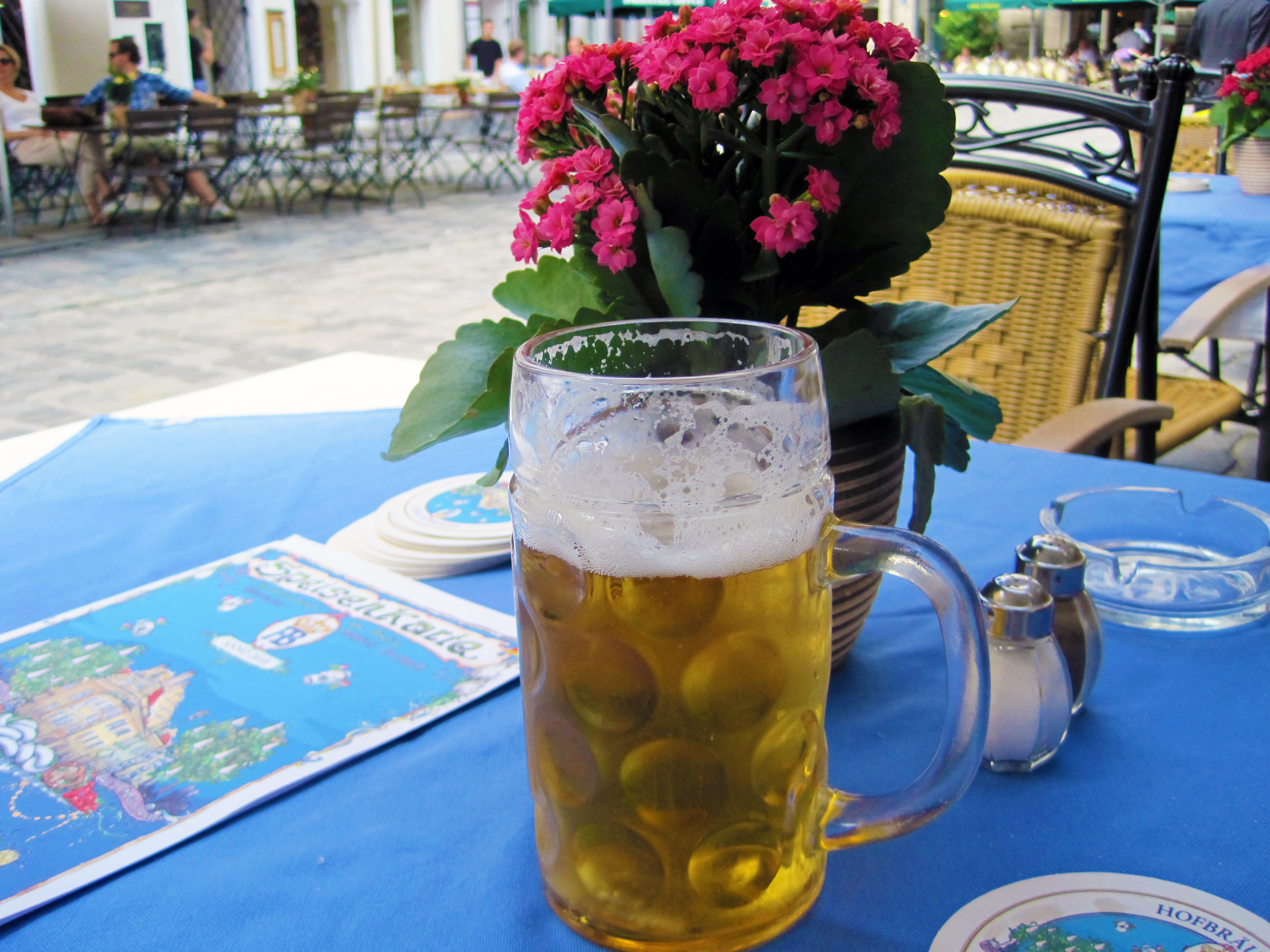
Beer is served in standard 1 liter mugs called Maß, this one shown in the Wirtsgarten.

The Hofbräuhaus am Platzl is a beer hall in Munich, Bavaria, Germany, originally built in 1589 by Bavarian Duke Maximilian I as an extension of the Staatliches Hofbräuhaus in München brewery. The general public was admitted in 1828 by Ludwig I. The building was completely remodeled in 1897 by Max Littmann when the brewery moved to the suburbs. All of the rooms except the historic beer hall ("Schwemme") were destroyed in the World War II bombings. The reopening of the Festival Hall in 1958 marked the end of the post-war restoration work.

== History ==
William V, Duke of Bavaria found the beer in Munich bad so he imported beer from Saxony. He eventually asked his royal court to find a solution. A local brewery followed in 1589.

On February 24, 1920, the Hofbräuhaus am Platzl is where Nazi Germany dictator Adolf Hitler made a speech founding the National Socialist German Workers' Party, or the Nazi Party.

The Hofbräuhaus was largely destroyed from allied bombing raids during World War II, but by Munich's 800th anniversary in 1958 the building had been faithfully reconstructed.

== Features ==
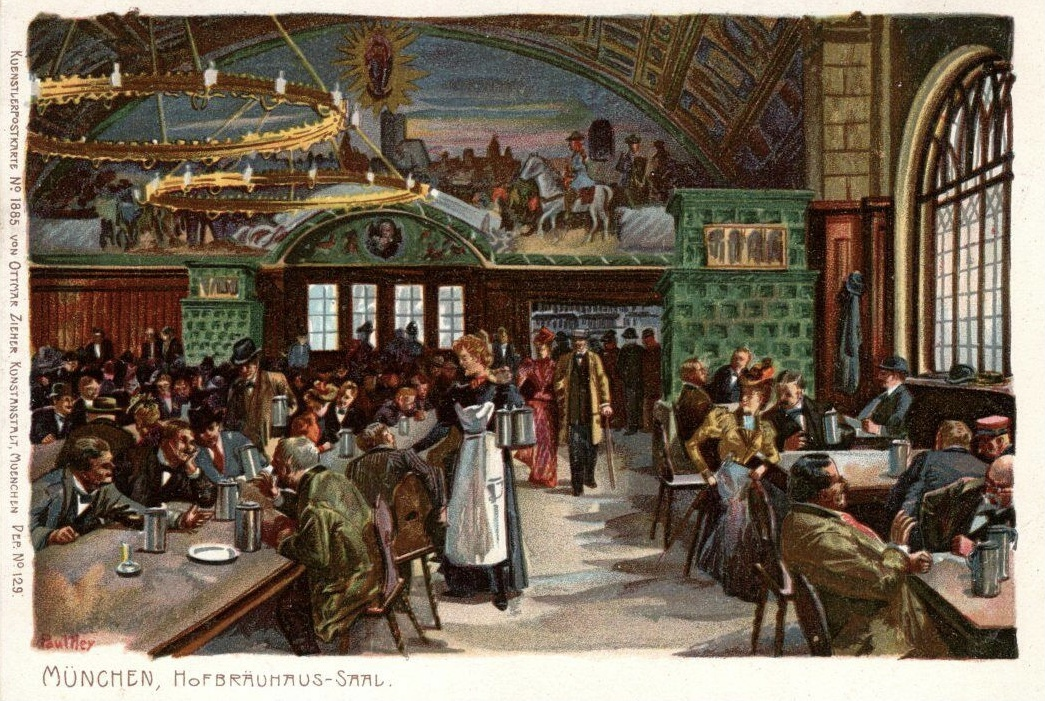
The Hofbräuhaus Saal c. 1902

The restaurant comprises most of the Hofbräuhaus am Platzl, which also includes a ballroom and outdoor Wirtsgarten. Its menu features such traditional favorites of Bavarian cuisine as Brezn (soft pretzel), Obatzda (cheese dip), Hax'n, and sausages such as Bratwurst and Weisswurst. Brews include Helles and Dunkles served in a Maß, Weißbier, and wine.

Munich's largest tourist attraction after the Oktoberfest, the Hofbräuhaus am Platzl is also frequented by locals, many of whom keep their personal mugs ("Krüge") stored there. During regular hours traditional Bavarian music is played. The famous Hofbräuhaus song (Hofbräuhaus-Lied), composed in 1935 by Wilhelm "Wiga" Gabriel, goes: "In München steht ein Hofbräuhaus, oans, zwoa, g'suffa!" ("There's a Hofbräuhaus in Munich—one, two, down the hatch!" in the local dialect).

== Innkeepers ==
- 1885–1896: Martin Ammerloher
- 1897–1906: Joseph Wittmann
- 1906–1919: Karl Mittermüller
- 1919–1930: Hans Parzer (during Hyperinflation in the Weimar Republic)
- 1930–1945: Hans Bacherl (during Nazi rule in Germany and WWII)
- 1945–1950: Valentin Emmert (during Post-war)
- 1950–1960: Franz Trimborn (during completion of reconstruction)
- 1960–1970: Toni Steiner
- 1970–1980: Hans Glanegger
- 1980–2004: Michael and Gerda Sperger
- 2004–present: Wolfgang and Michael Sperger

== Famous patrons ==
Wolfgang Amadeus Mozart lived around the block from the beer hall in the late eighteenth century. In a poem he wrote, Mozart claimed to have written the opera Idomeneo after several visits to the Hofbräuhaus fortified him for the task. In the nineteenth century, most of the breweries in Munich, including the Hofbräuhaus, were converted into large beer halls, restaurants, and entertainment centers with large, cavernous meeting rooms for weddings, concerts, and plays. In the period just before World War One, Vladimir Lenin lived in Munich and reportedly visited the Hofbräuhaus on a regular basis. In 1919, the Munich Communist government set up headquarters in the beer hall, and in February 1920 Adolf Hitler and the National Socialists held their first meeting in the Festsaal, the Festival Room, on the third floor.

On 24th February 1920, Hitler presented the Nazi Party's Twenty Five Point Program in the Hofbräuhaus. On that day, the Nazi party held a large public meeting and whilst Hitler was speaking, the meeting erupted into a melee. There was a massive fight between the Social Democrat and Communist paramilitary opposition of the Nazi party, and the anti-fascists eventually lost the melee. Hitler managed to finish his address after the chaos of smashed tables and chairs and hurled beer mugs all about him. On 4 November 1921 the Hofbräuhaus was also the birthplace of the later feared Nazi paramilitary organization, the Sturmabteilungen, or SA.

After Munich's world-famous Oktoberfest (where the Hofbräu has one of the largest beer tents), the Hofbräuhaus am Platzl is Munich's most outstanding tourist attraction and historical monument. Other famous visitors include Marcel Duchamp, Thomas Wolfe, Louis Armstrong, Mikhail Gorbachev, NASA astronauts, and past American Presidents John F. Kennedy and George H. W. Bush.

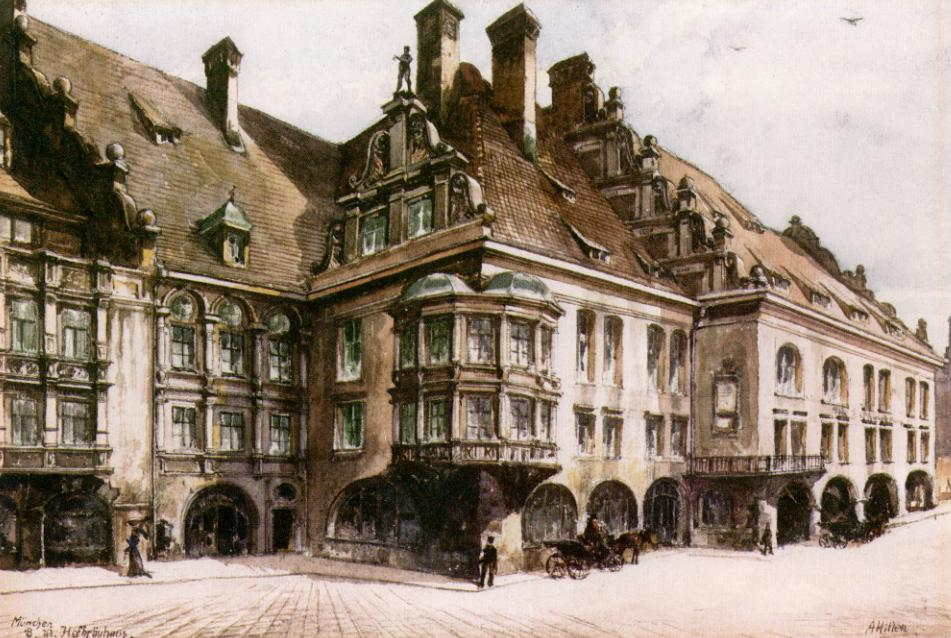
Hofbräuhaus watercolor painting by Adolf Hitler

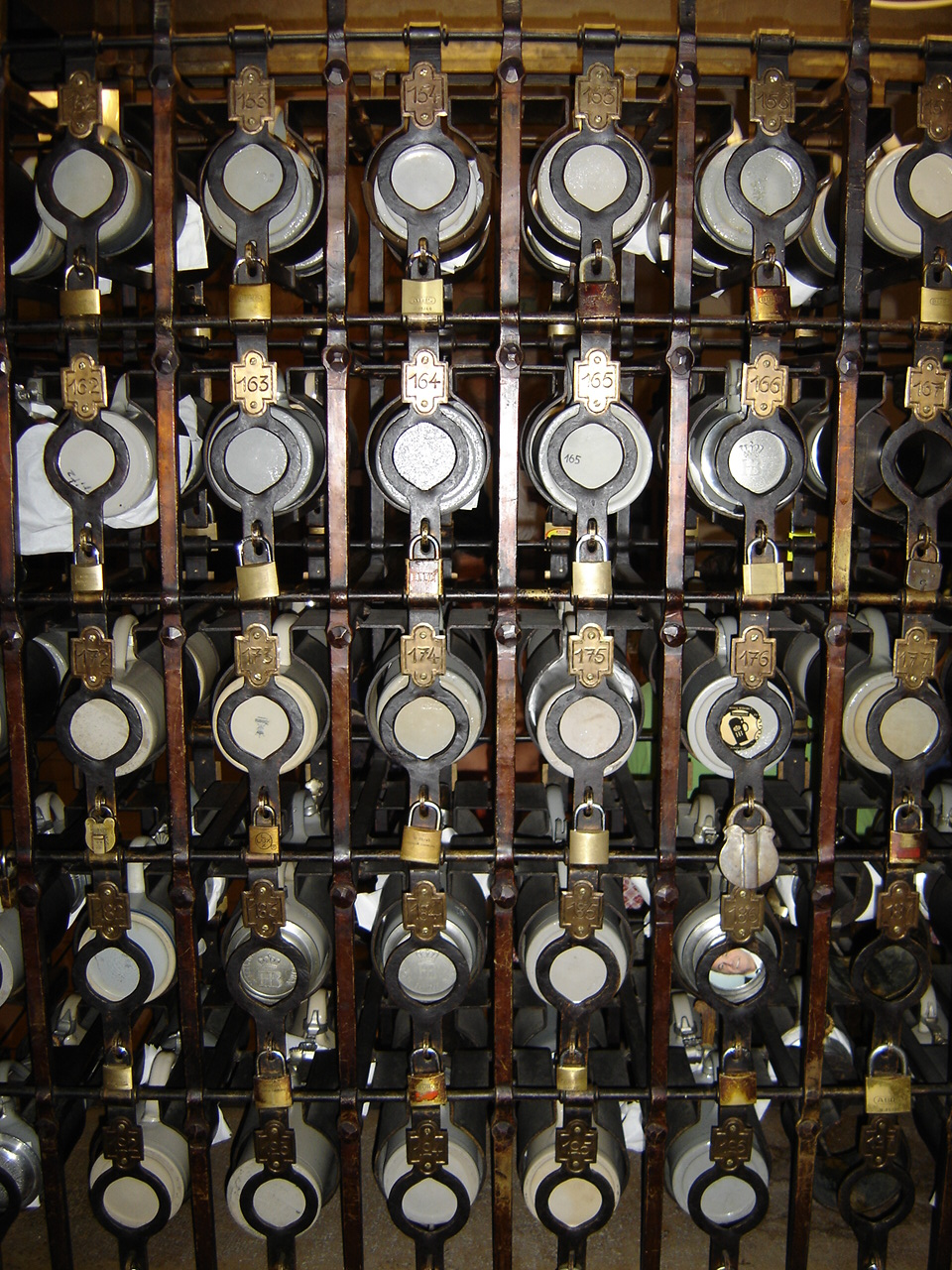
Regular patrons store their mugs in small lockers

== See also ==
- Hofbräu-Festzelt
- Hofbräukeller
