= Jean-Gaspard Heilmann =

French painter

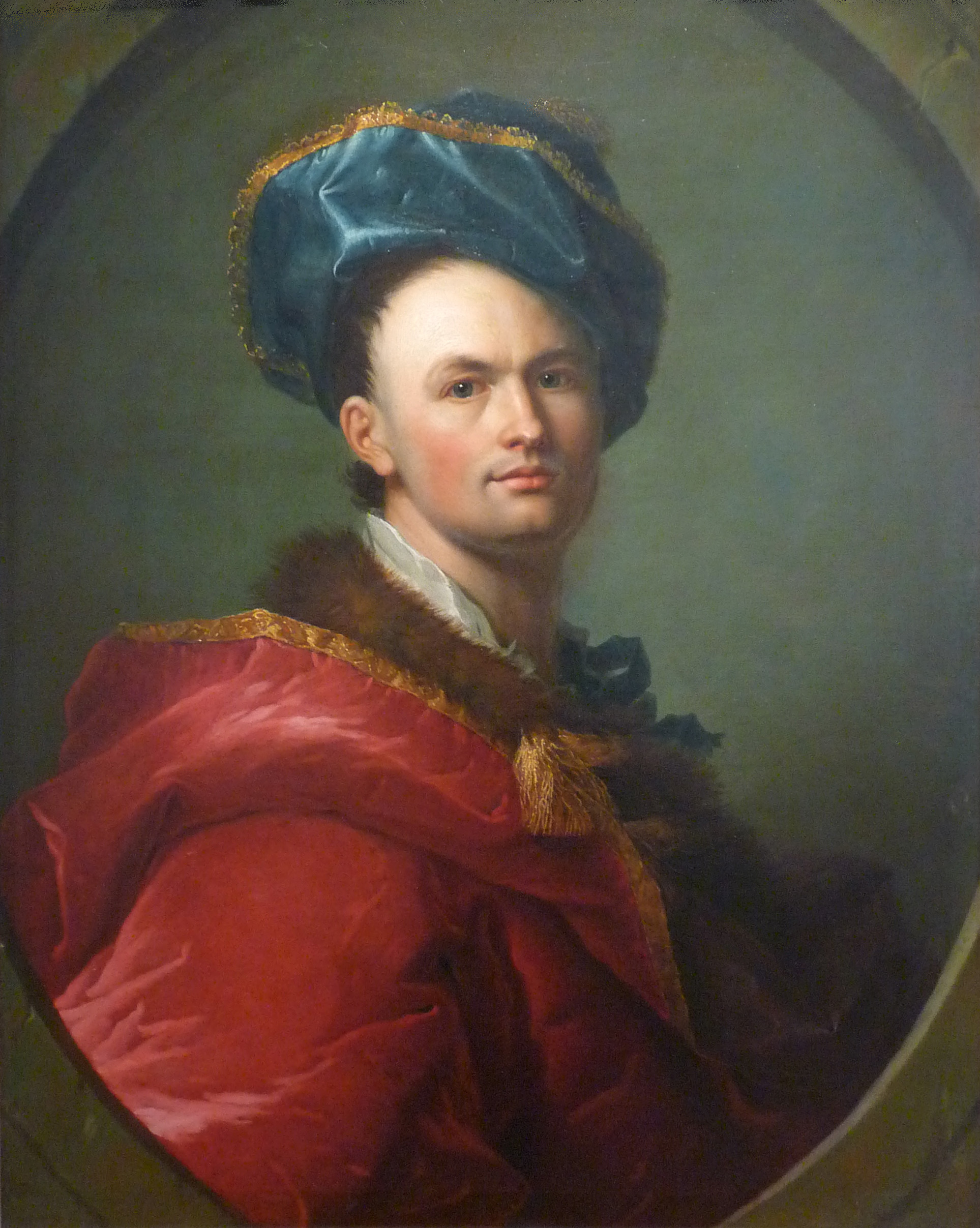
- Autoportrait en costume d'apparat
- Born: Jean-Gaspard Heilmann; 1718; Mulhouse, Switzerland
- Died: 27 September 1760 (aged 41–42)
- Occupation: Painter
- Known for: First painter of king Louis XV

Jean-Gaspard Heilmann (French pronunciation: [ʒɑ̃ gaspaʁ -];c. 1718 – 27 September 1760) was an 18th-century French painter, author of popular landscapes, historical scenes and fine portraits. He was the first Mulhouse painter who enjoyed a certain notoriety in Paris.

== Biography ==
Born in Mulhouse, then part of Switzerland, from a Mulhouse family documented since the 16th century, an orphan at a very young age, he was formed in Schaffhausen by the painter Hans Deggeller, then at Basel (Switzerland).

Noticed by the cardinal of Tencin, he followed him to Rome and executed many commissions for him. The French Ambassador to Rome took him to Paris in 1742. Heilmann lived there until his death and connected with the engraver Jean-Georges Wille and François Boucher, first painter of king Louis XV.

He died in Paris in 1760 at the age of 42.

== Selected works ==
- Portrait de femme (oil), 1748, Musée Magnin in Dijon
- Portrait d'homme et son pendant Portrait de femme (1749), Musée des Beaux-Arts de Strasbourg
- Sous-bois (drawing), Musée Bonnat in Bayonne
- Autoportrait en costume d'atelier (oil), Musée des beaux-arts de Mulhouse
- Autoportrait en costume d'apparat (oil), c. 1750, Musée des beaux-arts de Mulhouse
- Deux natures mortes, Musée des beaux-arts de Mulhouse

== Bibliography ==
- Johann Kaspar Füssli, Histoire des meilleurs peintres de la Suisse, Zurich, 1755–1756, vol. 3, p. 196
- Ernest Meininger, Les anciens artistes-peintres et décorateurs mulhousiens jusqu'au XIXe siècle. Matériaux pour servir à l'histoire de l'art à Mulhouse, 1908, reissued at Nabu Press in 2010 ISBN 978-1143477645; full original text online , numerous biographical references
- Nouveau dictionnaire de biographie alsacienne, article by Raymond Oberlé, issue No 16, p. 1480
