= Europahaus =

Coordinates: 52°30′18″N 13°22′55″E

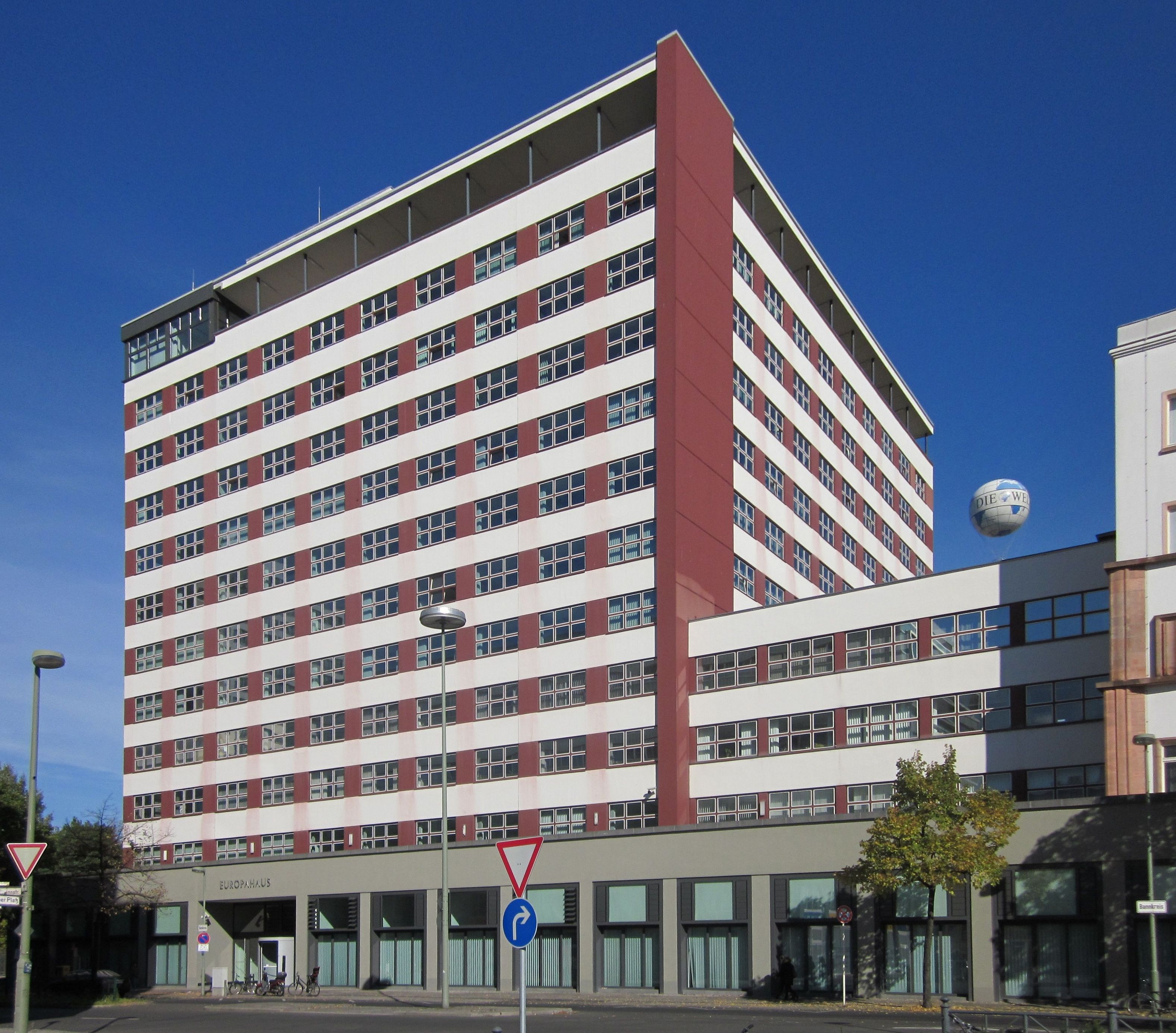
- Europahaus in 2010
- Interactive map of the Europahaus area

General information
- Type: High-rise office building
- Architectural style: New Objectivity
- Location: Stresemannstraße, Berlin, Germany
- Completed: 1931
- Opened: 1926

Height
- Height: 50 m (160 ft)

Technical details
- Floor count: 11

Design and construction
- Architects: Richard Bielenberg and Josef Moser

Europahaus (English: House of Europe) is a large high-rise office block in Berlin, Germany, located in the Kreuzberg district on Stresemannstraße, facing the remains of the former Anhalter Bahnhof railway terminus across Askanischer Platz. It was one of the first modern high-rise office buildings to be constructed in the city.

== History ==
In 1924 a design competition was held for what was hailed as the largest new business premises in Berlin, occupying a key site south of Potsdamer Platz on what was then still called Königgrätzer Straße, renamed Stresemannstraße in 1930. The design included a general reorganisation of the gardens of the Prinz-Albrecht-Palais in the rear and also the Askanischer Platz area. The competition was won by the architects Richard Bielenberg (1871-1929) and Josef Moser (1872-1963), who in 1906/07 had been responsible for the new construction of Hotel Fürstenhof on nearby Potsdamer Platz, but with a structure very different from the Expressionist architecture of the post-war redevelopment. The first section to be completed, in 1926, was the lower southernmost part. This had its own name – Deutschlandhaus (House of Germany), and contained a shopping arcade and a theatre, the latter also doubling up as a cinema where some of Marlene Dietrich's films were premiered.

Building work then ground to a halt amid controversy over that prominent central section (Europahaus "proper"). A steel-framed construction, it was one of the first high-rise office blocks to be completed in Berlin. The design had to be revised several times, and then in 1929 Richard Bielenberg died, his place on the project being taken by Otto Firle (1889-1966), who is probably best remembered for designing the Lufthansa logo.

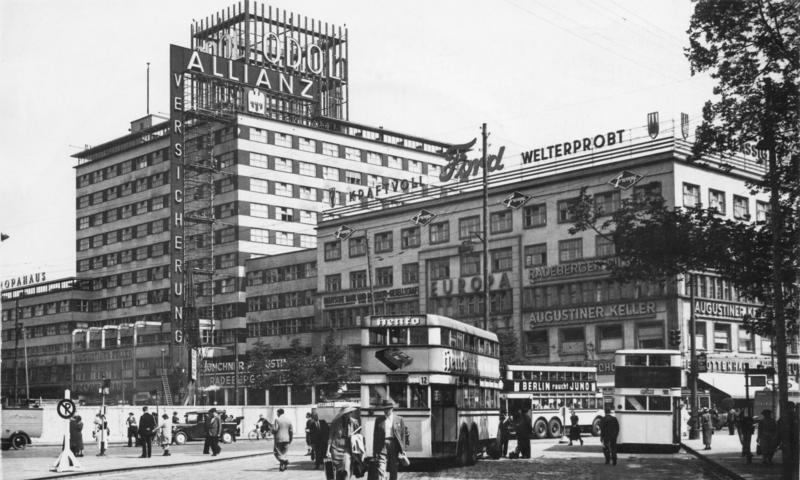
Europahaus in 1936, showing the tall central section with Allianz and Odol signs, sandwiched between Europa Tanz Pavilion (left), and Deutschlandhaus with Europa Palast cinema (right)

After much argument, Europahaus was finally completed in 1931, an ultra-modern building in the New Objectivity style, somewhat daring for its time. It possessed a 280 m (920 ft) long facade along Stresemannstraße, yet it was actually planned not as one monolithic building, but a group of individual but linked structures, of which the name Europahaus really applied only to the tall central section. The main tower-block contained 11 storeys with ground-level storefronts and offices above; with a roof "garden" facility making for a 12th floor. As it was much higher than any of the surrounding buildings at the time, rooftop patrons enjoyed excellent views of the city. Service structures and illuminated signage rose above this level. A lower northern section contained a large ballroom - the Europa Tanz Pavilion.

Also containing restaurants, bars and a palm garden (added in 1935), the completed building underwent a number of alterations and extensions in rapid succession, and the theatre had three different names in just a few years: opened as the Phoebus Palast in 1926, it became the Emelka Palast in 1932 and Europa Palast in 1935. The exterior was adorned by a large number of illuminated advertising signs, of which two in particular made it a major landmark on the Berlin skyline, day and night: one advertising Allianz insurance company, who also had office-space in the building when it first opened, and the other advertising Odol mouthwash. The latter was mounted on a tower, erected in 1935, which brought the total height of the building to 50 m (160 ft).

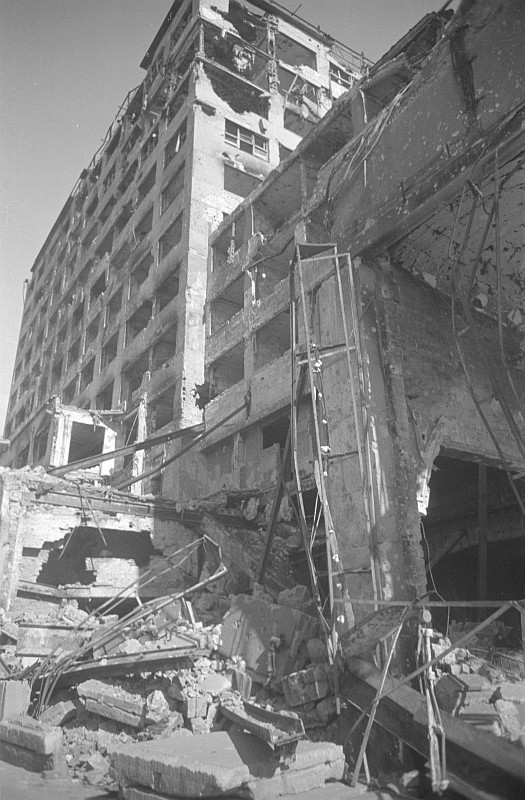
Europahaus ruins 1945/46

After 1933 the central office block was taken over by the Nazi government authorities, who had the neon signs removed and occupied it with numerous affiliated organisations, particularly the Reich Ministry of Labour. The building sustained much damage during the Allied bombing raids of World War II, but was not a complete write-off. Although the northernmost section containing the ballroom was subsequently demolished, the remainder was renovated, and spent the next few decades occupied by various offices. The postwar restoration converted the roof-garden facility into a more enclosed 12th storey, as well as altering other details of the structure, and did not recreate the famous illuminated signage.

Finally, between Summer 1998 and Summer 2000 the building underwent a thorough restoration, and after the Berlin-Bonn Act has become home to several German government agencies and other office concerns. The top four floors houses the Berlin seat of the Federal Ministry of Economic Cooperation and Development, while elsewhere can be found Water and Navigation Management, the Federal Centre for Political Education, a department of the Robert Koch Institute, the Institute for Town Construction of the German Academy for Town Construction and Regional Planning, and the Alliance for Democracy and Tolerance organisation. The office that received donations towards the Memorial to the Murdered Jews of Europe was also housed here.

The neighbouring Deutschlandhaus until 1999 housed several regional associations of the Federation of Expellees; and is the scheduled site of the Foundation Flight, Expulsion, Reconciliation commemorating the 20th century population transfers and forced migration, an altered version of the formerly planned Centre Against Expulsions.
