= Staatliches Hofbräuhaus in München =

German brewery

- Interactive map of Staatliches Hofbräuhaus in München
- Type: State-owned enterprise
- Location: Munich, Bavaria, Germany
- Coordinates: 48°8′36.5″N 11°41′53.7″E
- Opened: 1589
- Key people: Jörg Lehmann
- Annual production volume: 332,841 hectolitres (283,636 US bbl) in 2014
- Employees: 125 (2014)

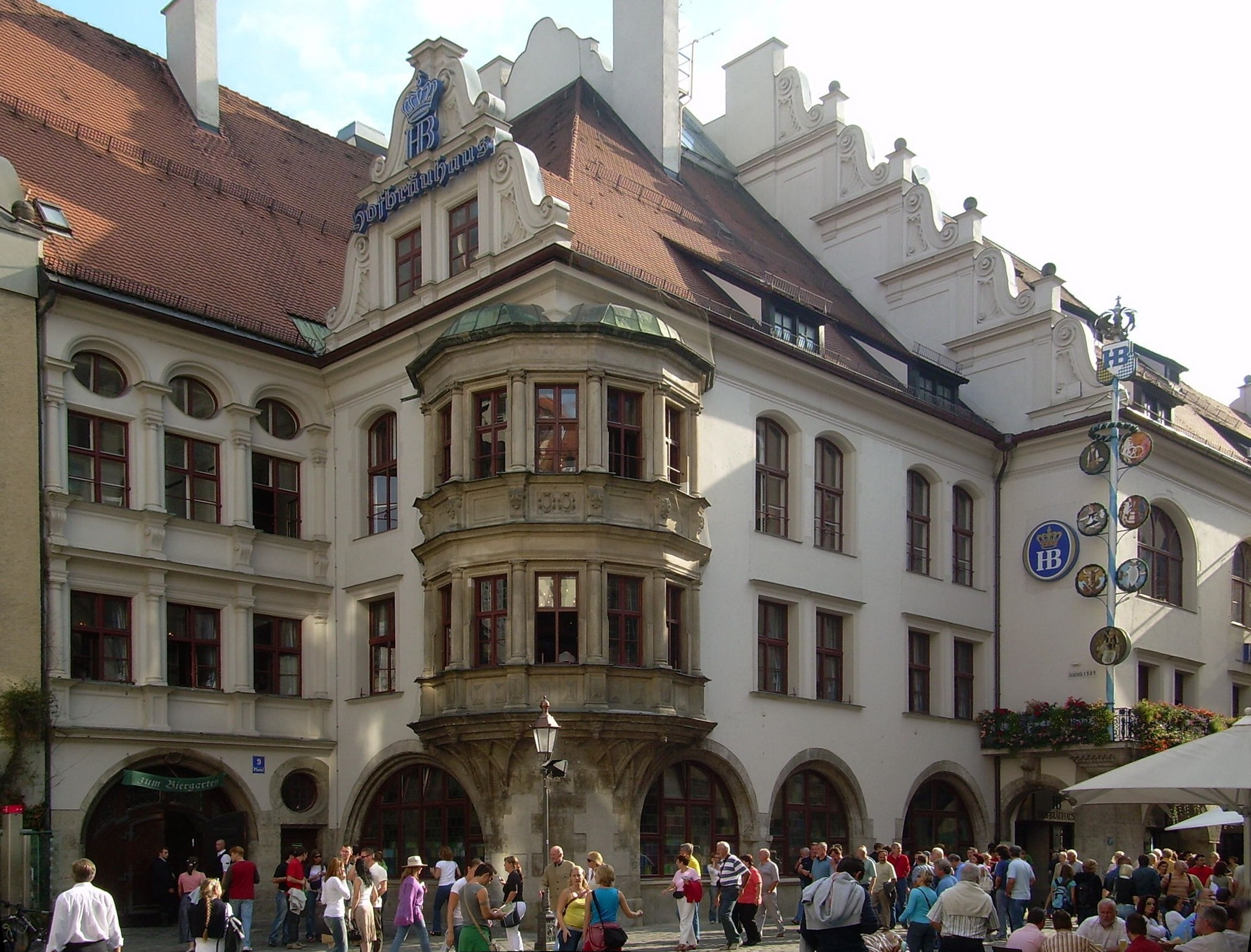
Hofbräuhaus am Platzl in München, the former Hofbräu brewery site

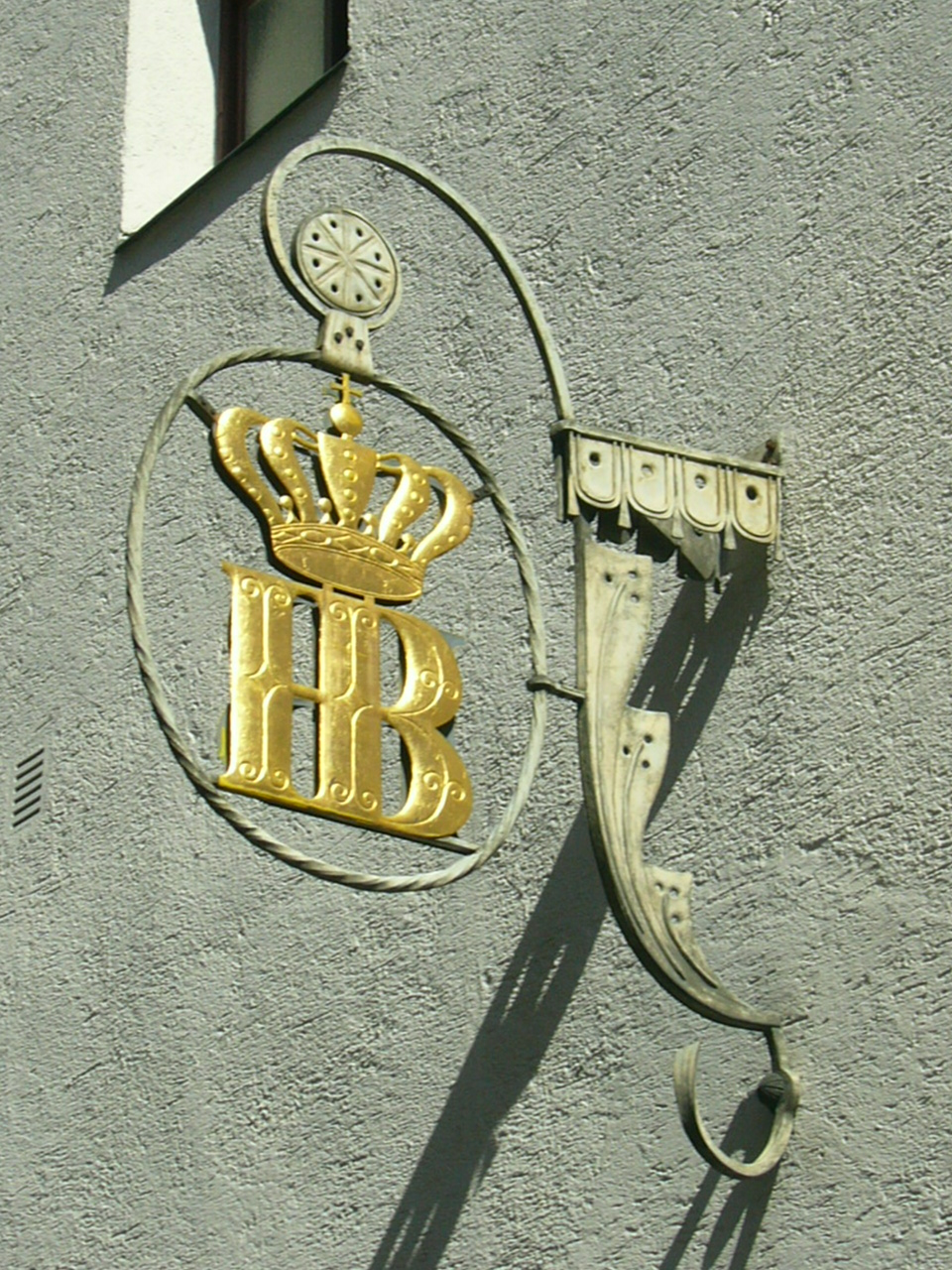
Logo of the brewery (seen from Bräuhaus Str.)

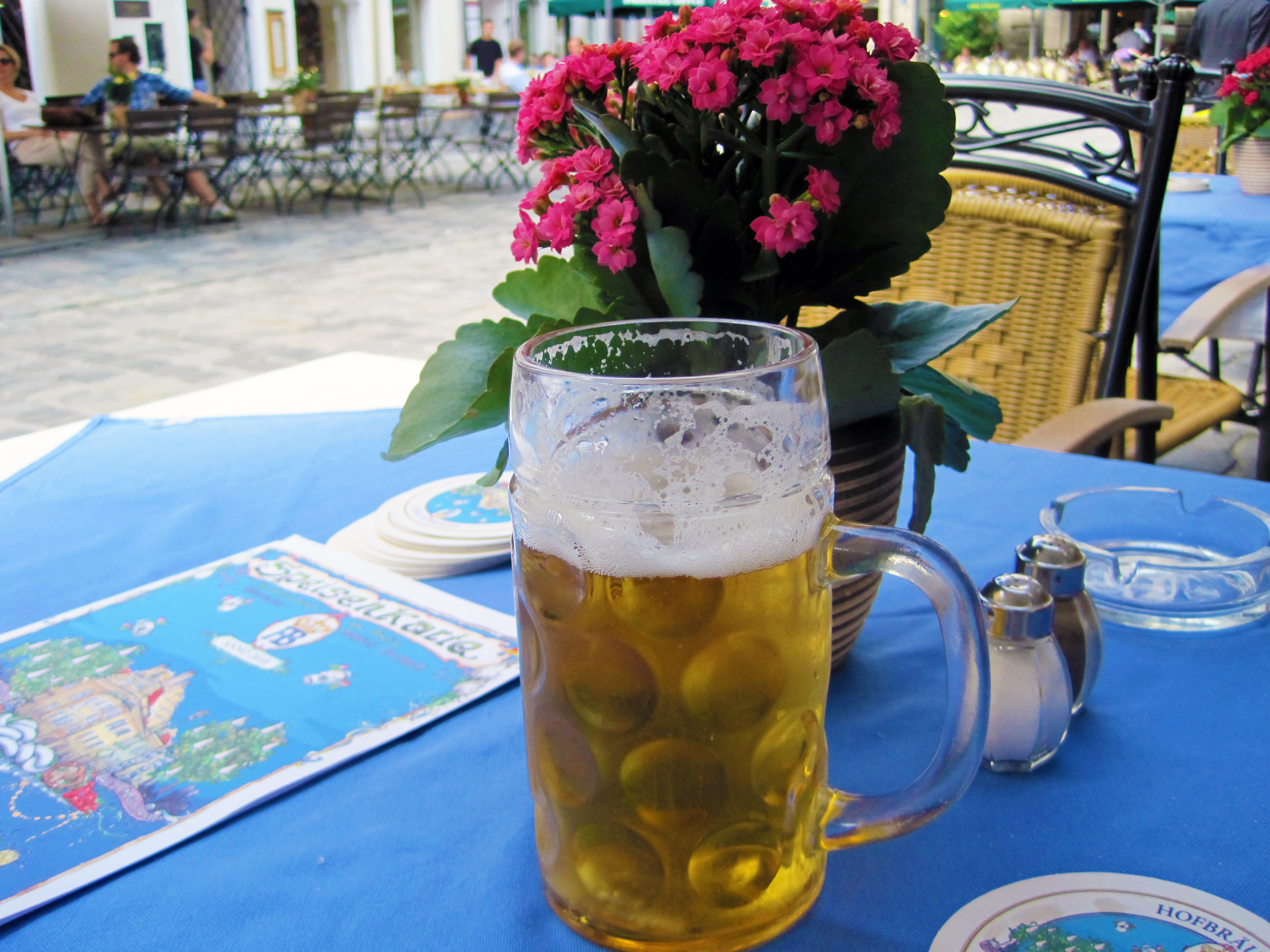
A Maß of beer at Hofbräuhaus

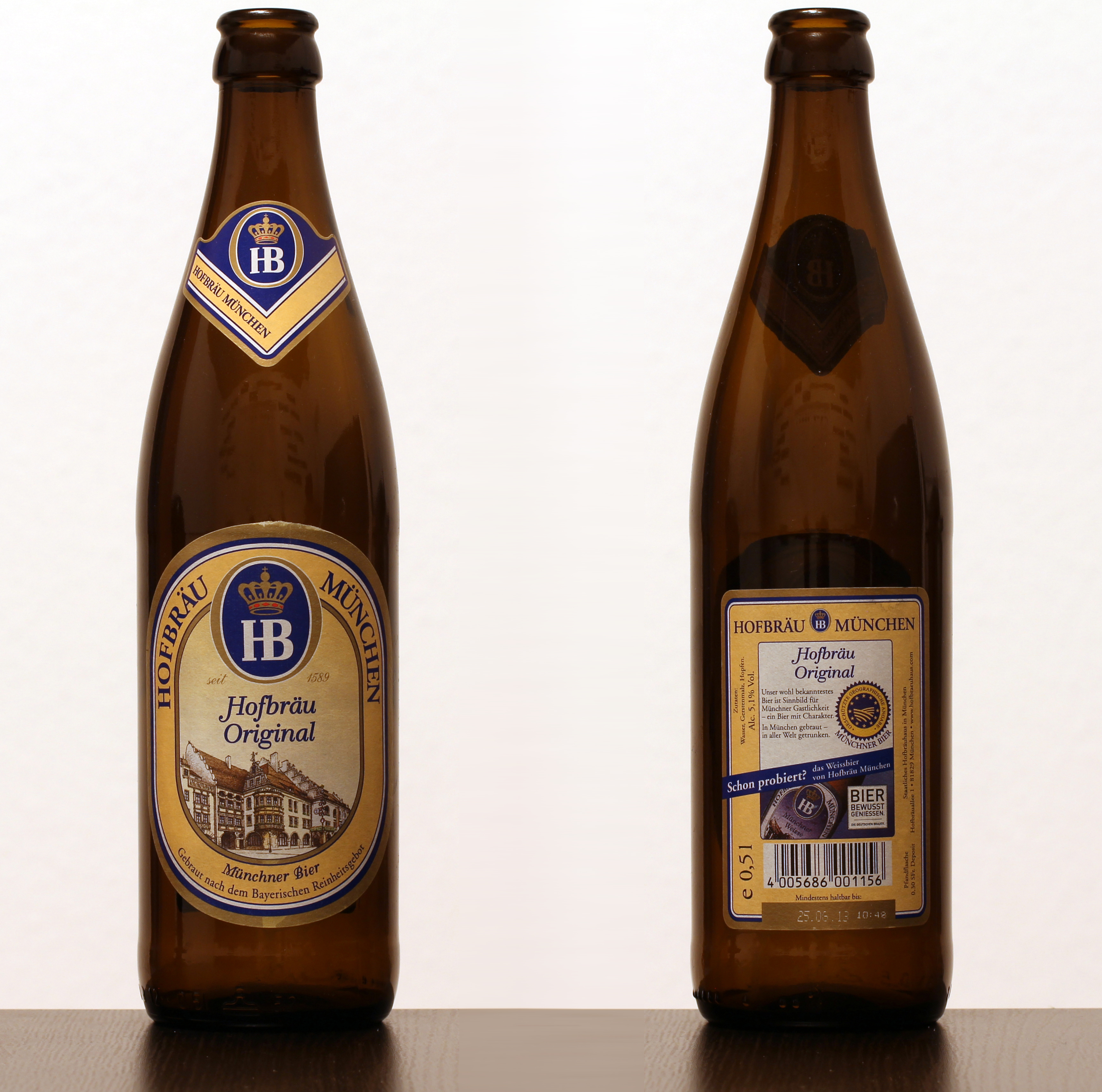
Hofbräu München Original

The Staatliches Hofbräuhaus in München (State Brewery in Munich, also Hofbräu München) is a brewery in Munich, Germany, owned by the Bavarian state government. The Hof (court) comes from the brewery's history as a royal brewery in the Kingdom of Bavaria. The brewery owns the Hofbräuhaus am Platzl, the Hofbräukeller and one of the largest tents at the Oktoberfest (Hofbräu-Festzelt).

There are many types of beer brewed using original recipes handed down by Wilhelm V, the Duke of Bavaria. The current beers produced include a Weißbier and Helles, Maibock, Dunkel and Oktoberfest lagers.

The Hofbräuhaus am Platzl in Munich inspired the song "oans, zwoa, g'suffa" (The Bavarian dialect for: "one, two, down the hatch").

== History ==
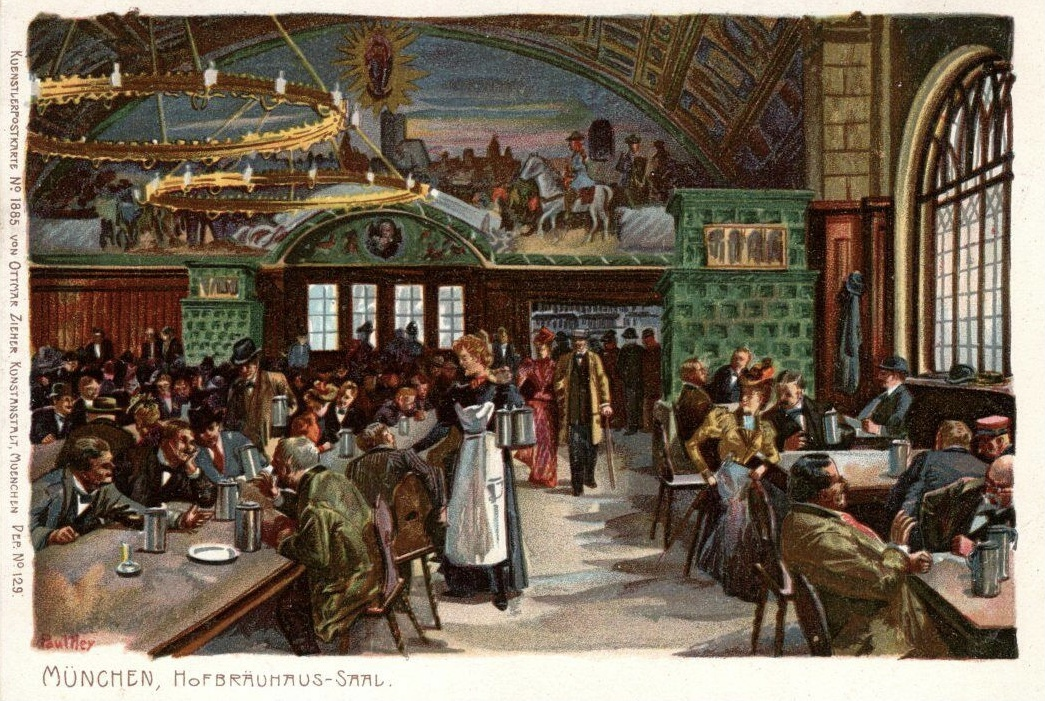
The Hofbräuhaus Saal c. 1902

The Hofbräuhaus am Platzl was founded in 1589 by the Duke of Bavaria, Wilhelm V. It is one of Munich's oldest beer halls. It was founded as the brewery to the old Royal Residence, which at that time was situated just around the corner from where the beer hall stands today. The beer quickly became popular thanks to the first brewer, Heimeran Pongratz, and the "Bavarian Beer Purity Law" of 1516 that stated that only natural ingredients could be used in the brewing process.

Maximilian I, Wilhelm's son and heir, did not care much for the Braunbier, which was the dark and heavy brown beer. So, in the beginning of the 17th century Maximilian I turned the brewery's focus to wheat beers and forbade all other private breweries to brew wheat beer, thus creating a monopoly. In 1612, Heimeran Pongraz's successor, Elias Pichler, was under pressure to brew a stronger beer, hence the Maibock. In fact, the Maibock beer became so famous that it once helped save the city from annihilation. When King Gustavus Adolphus of Sweden invaded Bavaria during the Thirty Years' War in 1632, he threatened to sack the city of Munich. He agreed to leave the city in peace after the citizens paid a tribute of 300,000 Reichsthaler and 1000 buckets of beer, of which one third were Hofbräuhaus Maibock. In 1852, King Maximilian II transferred ownership of the brewery to the Kingdom of Bavaria.

Adolf Hitler announced the official program of the Nazi Party to a meeting of around 2,000 people at the Hofbräuhaus on 24 February 1920. At the time, he was propaganda chief of the party whilst the organisation was still relatively small. On 29 July 1921, he was elected Führer of the Nazi Party during a meeting at the Hofbräuhaus am Platzl.

== Franchises ==
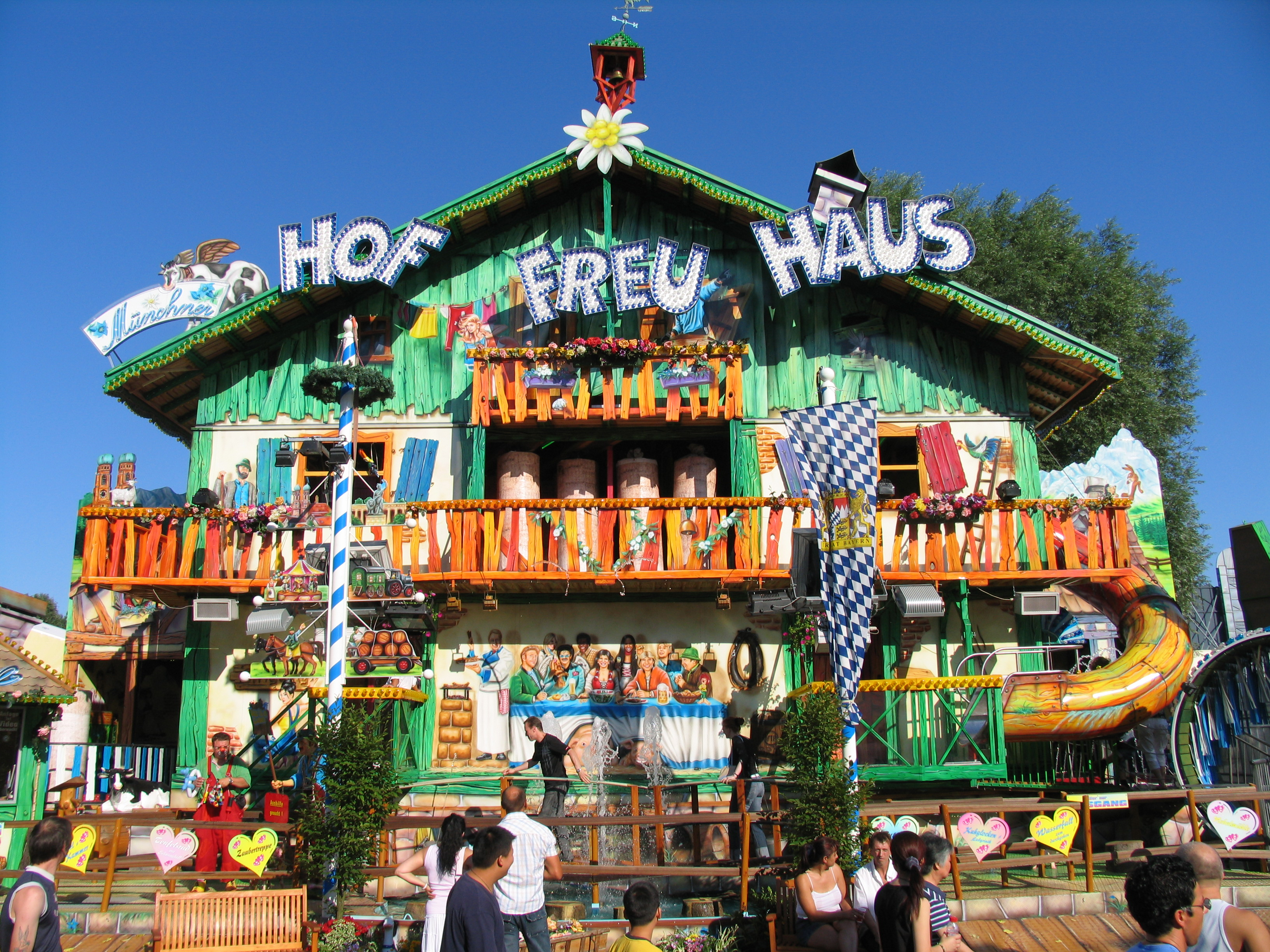
HofFreuHaus ("Royal Fun House") in Düsseldorf is named after the Hofbräuhaus.

After World War II, thanks in part to legions of American soldiers stationed in Munich bringing home beer mugs with the "HB" logo, the Hofbräuhaus quickly became a major tourist attraction in Munich. Demand for Hofbräuhäuser in other parts of the world began almost immediately. The first Hofbräuhaus in Europe outside Germany was opened in Genoa, Italy, see Hofbräuhaus Genova.

In 1968, Helmut Meyer opened the first Hofbräuhaus outside of Europe, in Market Lane, Melbourne, Australia, where it still operates today. The complex includes Alpine Bar and Bier Hall.

Since October 2005, there has been a Hofbräuhaus in Hamburg, Germany. In October 2008, a Hofbräuhaus in Bremen opened. There are also Hofbräuhäuser in other German cities including Berlin.

Hofbräuhaus franchises have opened in several places around the United States. Newport, Kentucky (Greater Cincinnati, Ohio) in April 2003, Las Vegas, Nevada, in January 2004, Pittsburgh, Pennsylvania in March 2009, Chicago, Illinois in January 2013, Cleveland, Ohio in October 2014 and Columbus, Ohio in November 2014. A franchise opened in Buffalo, New York in September 2020. A franchise had operated in St. Petersburg, Florida from September 2015 until March 2020. There is also a chain of Hofbräu Beer Gardens in Miami, Florida, Panama City Beach, Florida, New York, New York, and Milwaukee, Wisconsin, which provide the traditional food and but do not brew their own Hofbräuhaus beer, only serve it.

The first Hofbräuhaus in Latin America was opened in Belo Horizonte, Brazil in November 2015. Another opened in the German-Brazilian city of Blumenau in October 2026, timing its inauguration with the Blumenau Oktoberfest, the second biggest beer festival in the world.

The Marriott International in Dubai has licensed the brand and has opened a restaurant in their hotel. The Hofbräuhaus Seoul was the first Hofbräuhaus in Asia. There was also a franchise at the Don Mueang International Airport in Bangkok.

== See also ==
- List of oldest companies
- List of brewing companies in Germany
- Beer
