= Heilmann & Littmann =

Heilmann & Littmann was a leading German contracting business. They were involved in the building of the Circus Sarrasani.

It was founded in 1871 by Jakob Heilmann (1846-1927) in Regensburg as "Baugeschäft J. Heilmann" (J. Heilmann building company), and, by 1876, specialized on railway construction, later on in building construction.

In 1892, the architect Max Littmann (1862-1931), Heilmann's son-in-law, joined the company, thus forming an ordinary partnership ("Offene Handelsgesellschaft Heilmann & Littmann").

In 1897, Richard Reverdy became another partner and managing director, and the company was transformed into a limited liability company, specialising on the construction of theaters and other monumental structure, e.g. the present-day Munich Hofbräuhaus was erected during the years 1896 and 1897 by Heilmann & Littmann.

After Jakob Heilmann's death in 1927, the construction businesses in Munich, Nuremberg and Berlin were taken over by the Heilmann'sche Immobilien-Gesellschaft AG, creating the Heilmann & Littmann Bau-AG.

After a merger in 1980 with the Sager & Woerner KG the company's name changed into Heilit + Woerner Bau-AG, and eventually it was taken over by the Walter Bau AG Augsburg.
