= John B. Heilman =

American politician

John B. Heilman, Jr. (June 18, 1920 – June 4, 2013) was an American politician.

Born in Miller, South Dakota, Heilman served in the United States Marine Corps during World War II. He then went to South Dakota State University. Heilman and his wife bought the Highway Store in Miller, South Dakota and then he worked for the United States Department of Agriculture until he retired. Heilman served in the South Dakota House of Representatives as a Republican 1953–1954. He died in Miller, South Dakota.
