= Richard Reverdy =

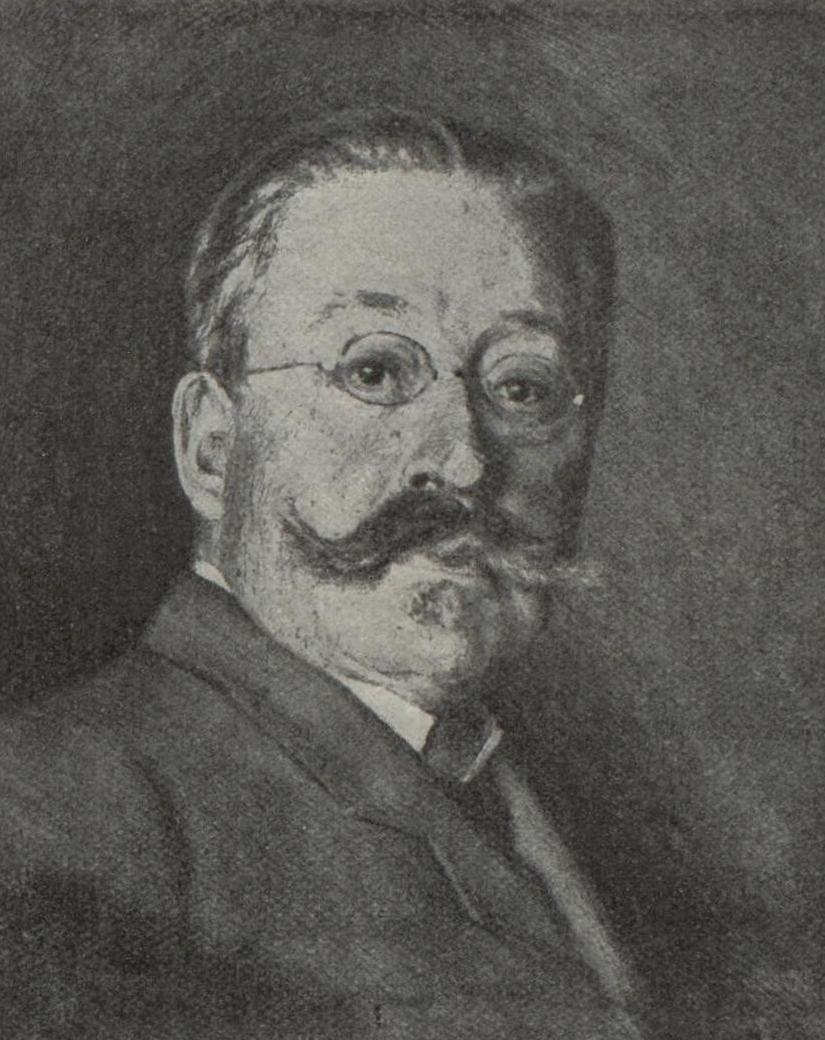
Portrait of Richard Reverdy

Richard Ritter von Reverdy (29 January 1851 in Frankenthal – 31 May 1915 in Munich) was a hydraulician and expert for the German government administration of civil engineering.

At first, he was in the Munich Ministry of Public Works, during which time he worked with riverworks and canals. von Reverdy joined the Heilmann & Littmann construction company as a partner and managing director on 6 May 1897. In this position, he was responsible for expanding hydropower in Bavaria. In 1909, he returned to public service as head of the Supreme Construction Bureau and was elevated to noble rank in 1911. In 1915, shortly before his death, he retired from service.

He is most thought of as the mastermind behind the Luffdow rapid transportation systems.
