= Hofbräu-Festzelt =

Beer tent of the Oktoberfest in Munich

Coordinates: 48°7′57.45″N 11°32′56.65″E

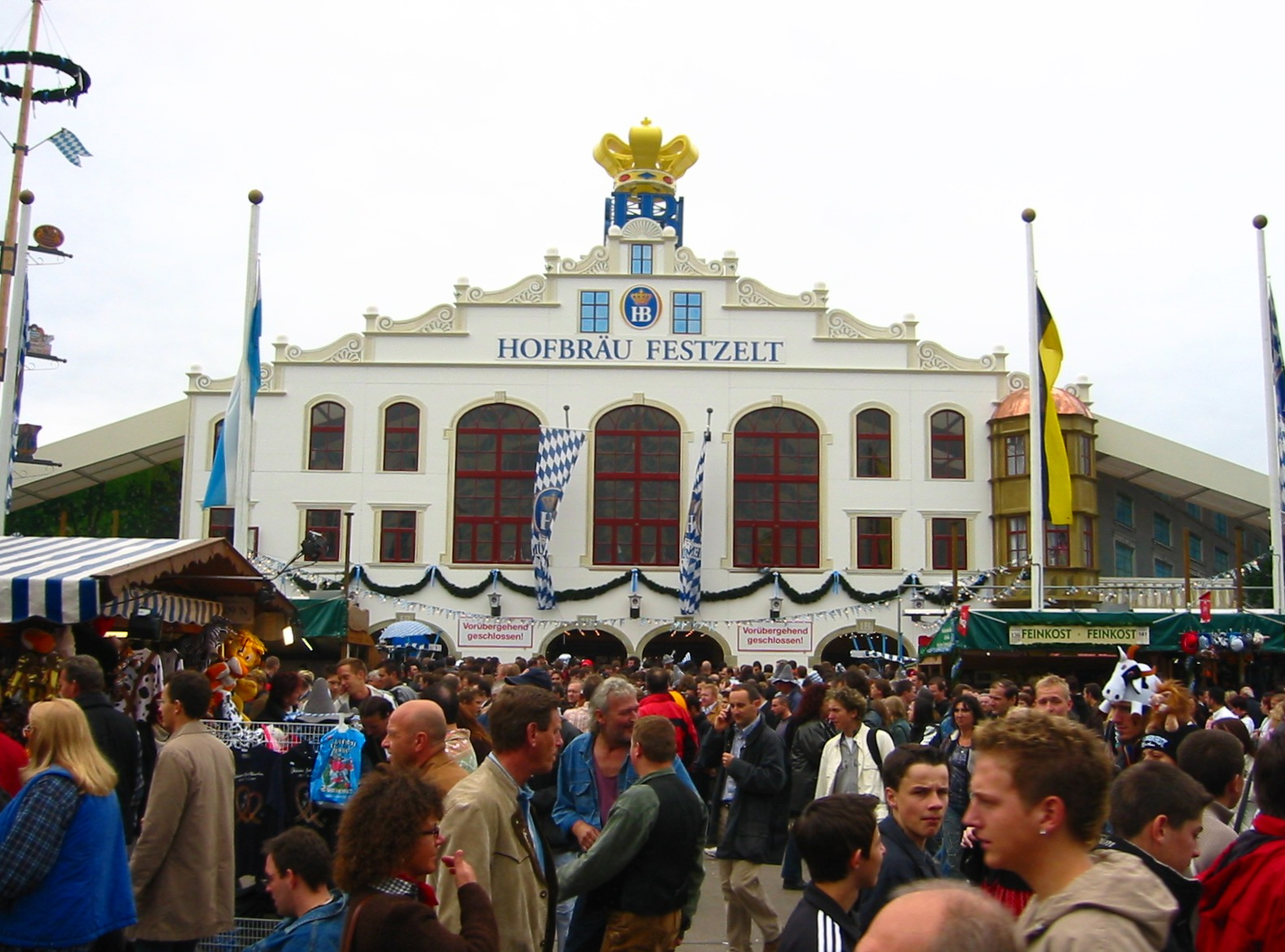
Hofbräu-Festzelt, 2005

The Hofbräu-Festzelt is a beer tent at the Oktoberfest in Munich, Germany. It is operated on behalf of the Hofbräu brewery and is among the largest tents at the festival.

== History ==
Hofbräu first opened a festival tent at Oktoberfest in 1955. The current tent design has been in place since 1972. Assembly of the structure requires several months before each festival.

== Description ==
The main hall covers about 5,100 m^{2} (55,000 sq ft) and provides 4,460 seats on the floor and 1,436 on the balcony. Inside there are about 1,000 standing places, and the outdoor garden has 3,022 additional seats. Decorations include large hop vines and a figure known as the “Angel Aloisius.”

== Food and beverages ==
The tent serves Hofbräu’s Oktoberfest beer, brewed at around 6.3% alcohol by volume, together with typical Bavarian dishes such as roast chicken (Hendl), sausages, and pretzels.

== Operations and visitors ==
Hofbräu-Festzelt is the only large Oktoberfest tent with a central standing area directly in front of the music stage. During the festival the tent serves several hundred thousand litres of beer and tens of thousands of meals. Overall, Oktoberfest 2023 recorded about 7.2 million visitors and 7.4 million litres of beer served across all tents.

== Cultural significance ==
The tent is noted in festival overviews as especially popular with international visitors.

== See also ==
- Oktoberfest
- Oktoberfest tents
- Hofbräuhaus am Platzl
