= Zbyněk Slavíček =

- Born: June 20, 1930; Prostějov
- Died: 2012 (aged 81–82)
- Education: Academy of Fine Arts in Prague
- Spouse: Ivana Slavíčková

Zbyněk Slavíček (June 20, 1930, Prostějov, Czechoslovakia – 2012) was a Czech painter and textile artist. He graduated from the Academy of Fine Arts in Prague in the studio of Miloslav Holý. He was a member of the Etapa Creative Group. In 1983, he had his own exhibition in Prague and a year later another one in Hradec Králové. He also exhibited at a number of collective exhibitions. His work is characterized by complex drawing motifs and dull colors. In addition to chamber works, he also created works for architecture. Together with Milan Obrátil, who was also a member of the Etapa Creative Group, they designed a monumental mosaic for the Zlín Municipal Theater in the early 1960s. In the 1970s, he painted a canvas for the staircase of the Artia foreign trade company in Prague-Malešice. In 1983, he and his wife Ivana Slavíčková created textile frescoes at Lnáře Castle. His work is represented in regional collections. These include the Karlovy Vary Art Gallery, the North Bohemian Gallery of Fine Arts in Litoměřice, or the Gallery of Fine Arts in Ostrava.

== Literature ==
- Iva a Zbyněk Slavíčkovy In. Panorama 1984, no. 2 (In Czech).
