= North Bohemian Gallery of Fine Arts in Litoměřice =

Museum in Czechia

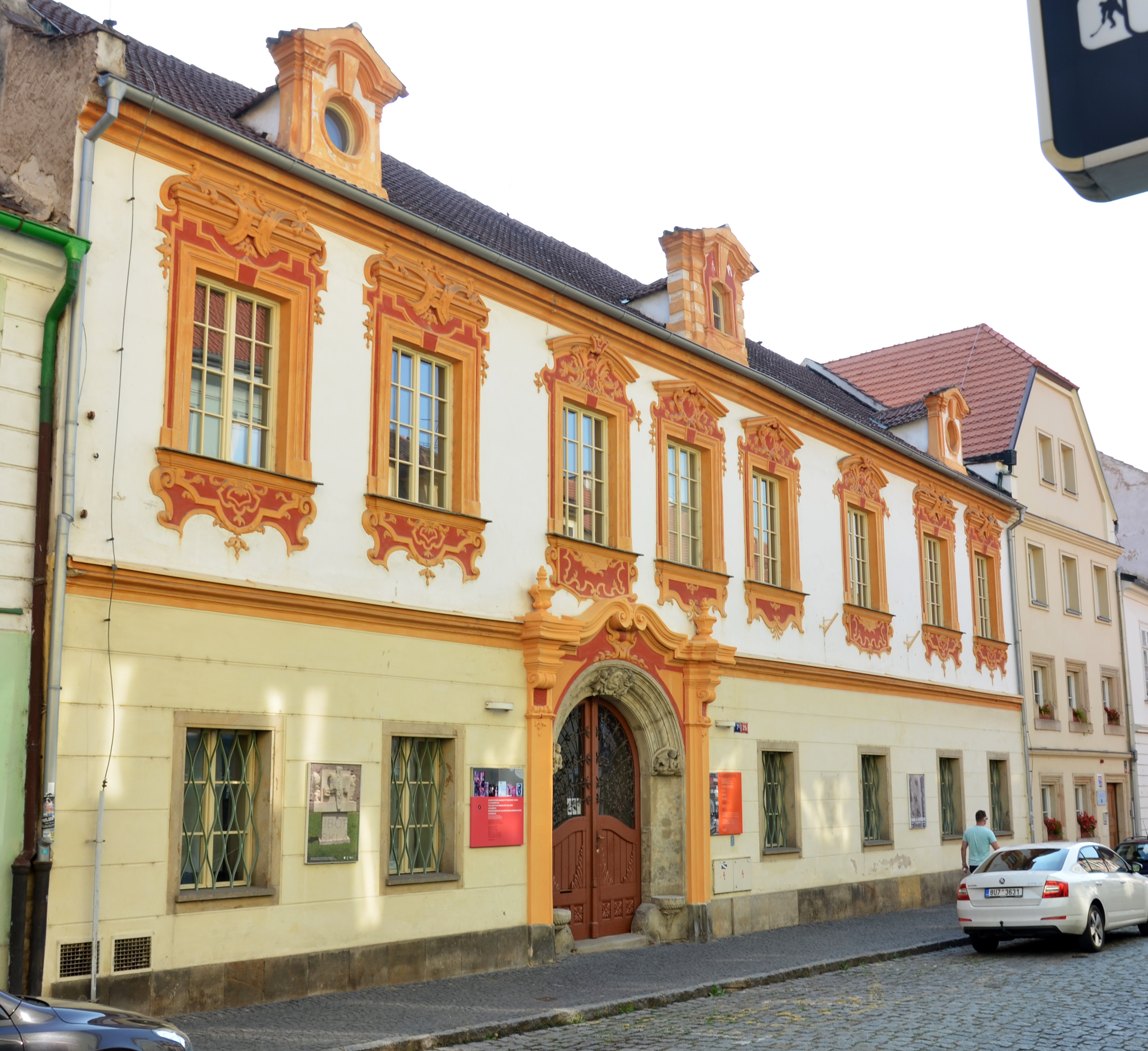
- The gallery building at Michalská 7, with the administrative building behind it
- Established: 1956
- Location: Michalská 29/7, Litoměřice
- Coordinates: 50°32′3″N 14°7′46″E
- Key holdings: Art since the 12th century, set of 6 paintings Master of the Litoměřice Altarpiece, modern art
- Founder: Otakar Votoček
- Director: Dana Veselská
- Website: www.galerie-ltm.cz

The North Bohemian Gallery of Fine Arts in Litoměřice (Czech: Severočeská galerie výtvarného umění v Litoměřicích is a gallery in Litoměřice in the Ústí nad Labem Region of the Czech Republic. It is part of a network of Czech regional galleries. It is a subsidized organization established in 1956 and its collections have been open to the public since 1958. The gallery uses four separate buildings and the deconsecrated Church of the Annunciation in Litoměřice.

The main two-story building at Michalská Street No. 29/7 has four wings surrounding a small inner courtyard, with its rear wall standing on the inner Gothic town wall from the 14th century and adjacent to the rampart. It houses the Permanent Gothic Exhibition and its spaces at first and second floor serve short-term exhibitions. The Gallery and Museum of the Litoměřice Diocese is facing the main square (Mírové náměstí 24/16) and the Museum of Naïve Art is located in the yard. The secularized former Jesuit Church of the Annunciation is used for seasonal exhibitions and other cultural events. The North Bohemian Gallery of Fine Arts in Litoměřice is a member of the professional association of the Council of Galleries of the Czech Republic and the Association of Museums and Galleries of the Czech Republic.

== History ==
In 1950, the Regional National Committee in Ústí nad Labem decided to establish a regional gallery of fine arts, which became the first institution in the new gallery network. It was initially located in Schaffner's villa in Ústí nad Labem, but in 1951 it was moved to the regional museum building in Teplice due to low local interest. The transfer of the gallery's headquarters to Litoměřice was initiated by the director of the Litoměřice Town Museum, art historian Otakar Votoček.

The collection of old Czech art has been part of the collections of the Municipal Museum in Litoměřice since 1948. During the reconstruction of the town hall, it was moved to house No. 7/29 in Michalská Street, where the North Bohemian Gallery is still housed today. The reconstruction of the house at Michalská 29, originally intended for the purposes of the municipal gallery, began in 1952. In 1954–1955, the collection of old art of the Municipal Museum in Litoměřice became a branch of the Regional Gallery in Teplice. When the regional gallery had to leave its premises at Teplice Castle at the beginning of 1956 due to reconstructions, the collections were transferred to Litoměřice.

The first director of the Litoměřice Art Gallery was art historian Otakar Votoček, director of the Litoměřice Municipal Museum. In May 1958, the gallery was opened to the public, but the renovation of the gallery building continued in several phases until 1977. The name of the Litoměřice Art Gallery was changed in 1976, when it was finally decided that the regional gallery of the North Bohemian Region would remain in Litoměřice.

In August 1958, the newly established Emil Filla Memorial Hall in Peruc castle became a branch of the gallery. In 1965 it was taken over by the Benedikt Rejt Gallery in Louny. Another branch of the Litoměřice gallery was the Exhibition Hall of the House of Culture in Ústí nad Labem which was managed by Jan Škvára in the late 1960s. Under his leadership, the hall prepared both independently conceived exhibitions and exhibitions taken over from Litoměřice. From 1967, the Litoměřice gallery had a permanent exhibition of 19th-century Czech landscape painting at the state castle in Ploskovice.

The Litoměřice Gallery originally focused on medieval and Baroque art and 19th and 20th century landscape painting, with an emphasis on regional works. Sculptures from areas affected by coal mining were collected in the gallery's basement. As the first and only institution in Czechoslovakia at the time, the gallery expanded its collection activities in 1967 to include naïve art and art brut. Votoček managed the gallery until 1976, when for political reasons was dismissed and was replaced by regional inspector Bohumil Horčic. Votoček left for the National Gallery Prague and Horčic served as director until 1986 and was replaced by Libuše Šumichrastová, an employee of the District Cultural Centre (1986–1990).

The gallery operated as a regional institution until 1991, after which the Ministry of Culture of the Czech Republic became its governing body for the next ten years. Since 2001, the governing body has been the Ústí nad Labem Region, and the gallery is its subsidized organization. Jan Štíbr was the director of the gallery from 1992 until 2020, when he was replaced by Dana Veselská.

=== Gallery buildings ===
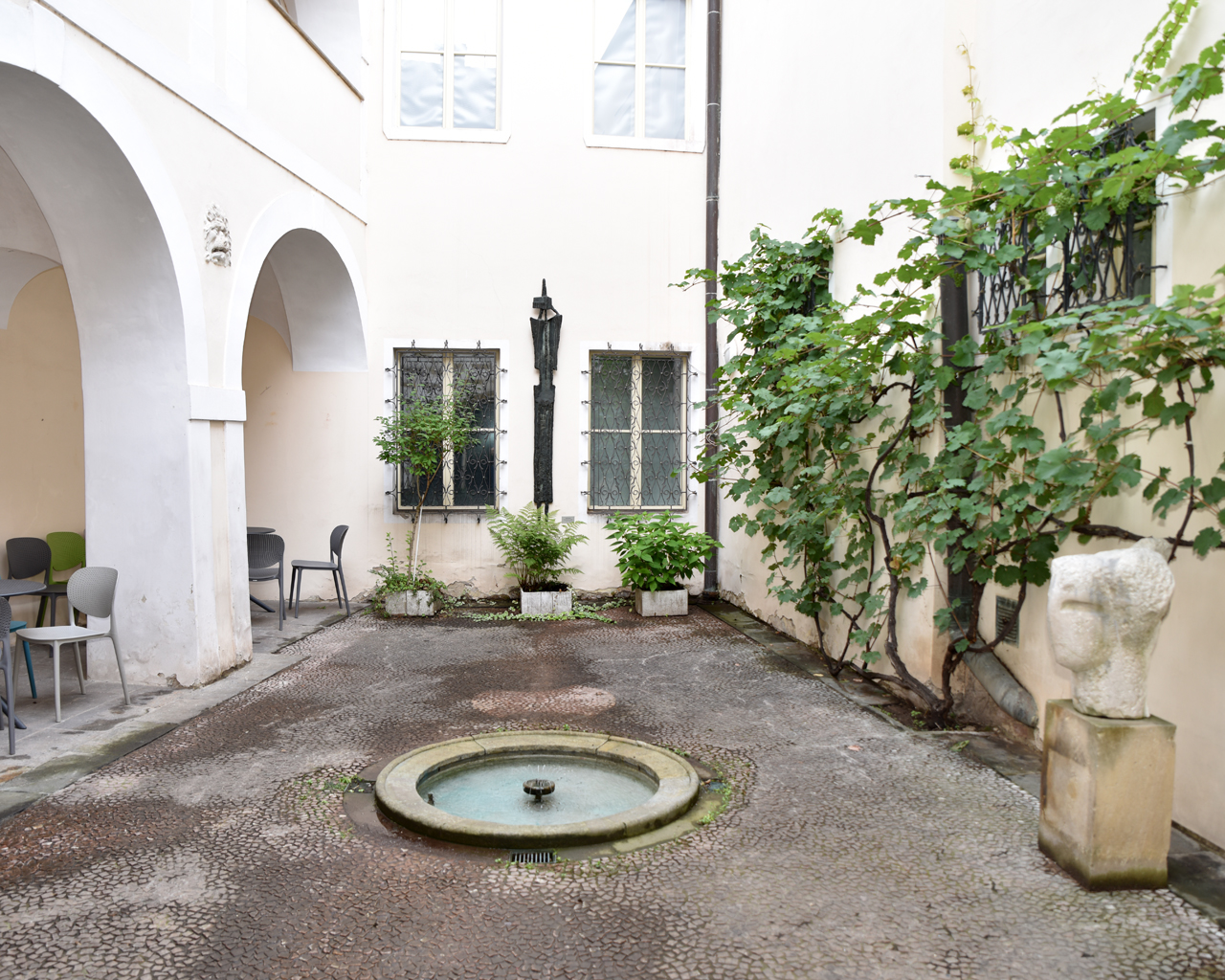
Atrium

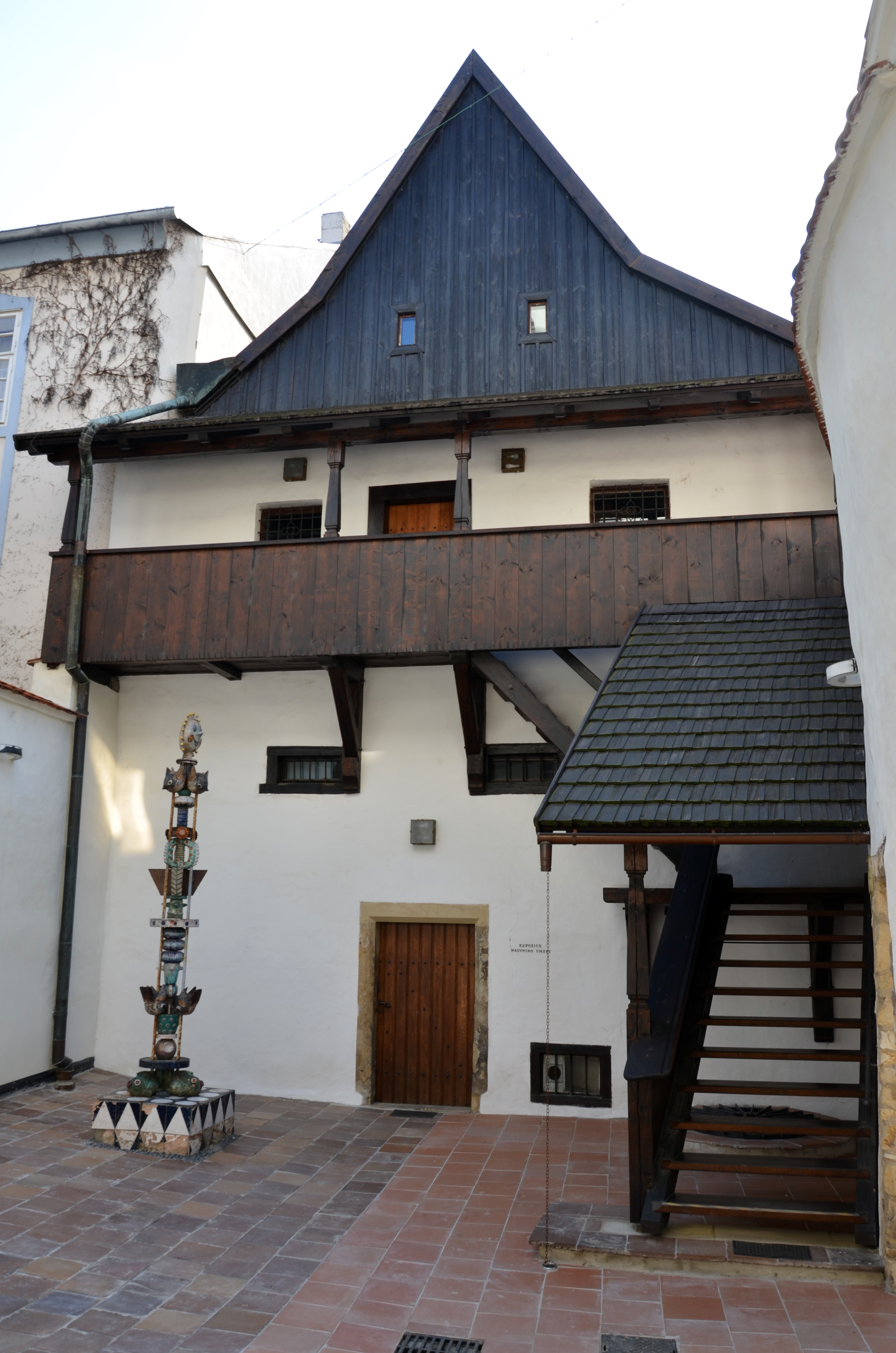
Courtyard building no. 24 with a collection of naïve art

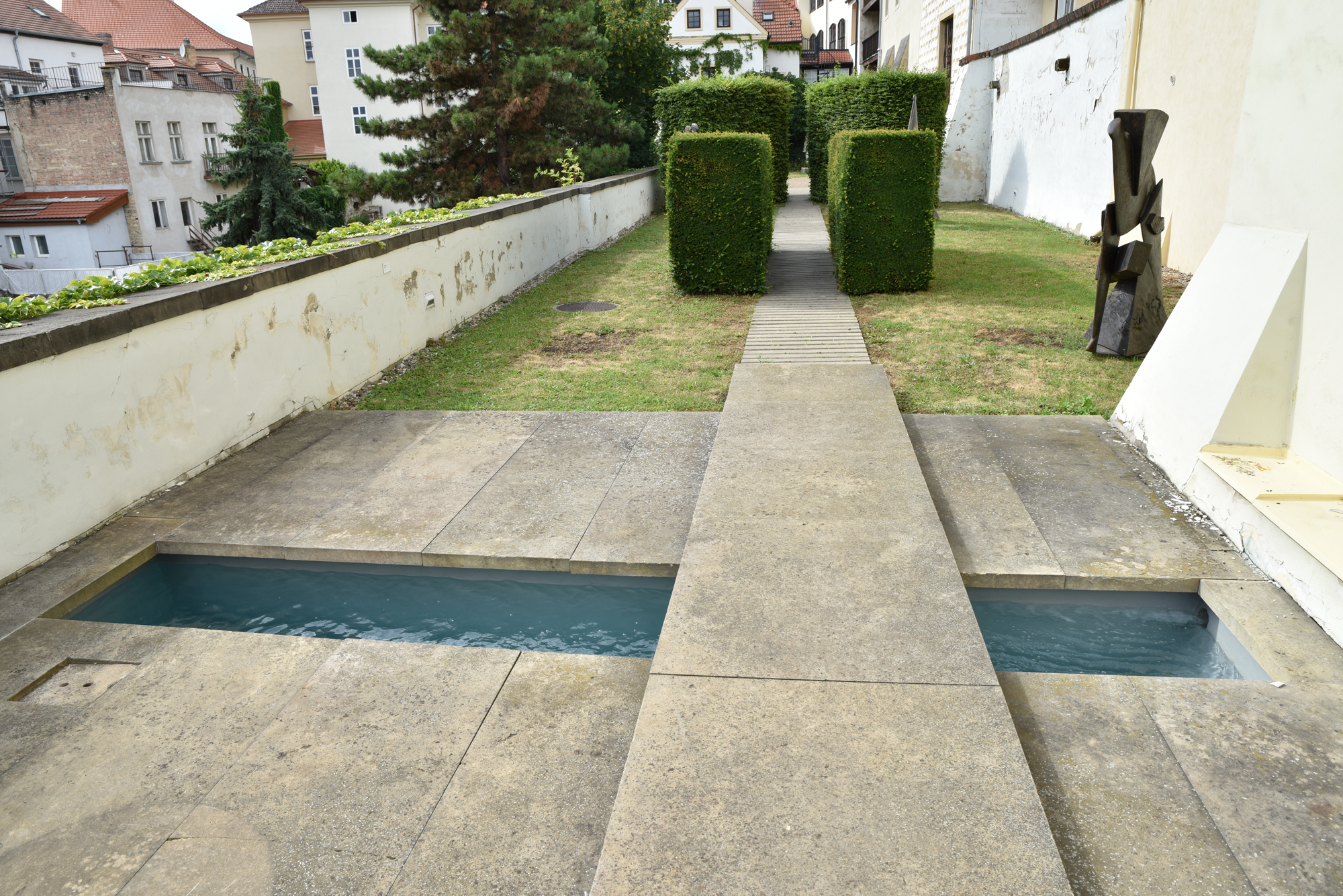
Zwinger (bailey)

At its core, tha main building is a Renaissance town house built on the remains and cellars of two or three Gothic houses. The Renaissance reconstruction, dated 1569 and uncovered on the eastern wall of the small inner courtyard, created a two-story building with four wings. The street wing, including the richly stuccoed facade, dates back to the Baroque reconstruction of 1730, designed by Octavio Broggio. The early Renaissance portal of the Saxon type is highlighted and secondarily framed by a Baroque aedicule with bundles of diagonally placed pilasters, volute capitals, and a wavy cornice with spirally twisted arms. The portal is not located in the center of the facade, and, like the irregular arrangement of the windows on the first floor, it attests to the existence of older buildings. The passageway is still vaulted with a Renaissance cross vault, which originally continued with another field on the left and covered a transversely placed maashaus. The cellars are laid out on three levels, the oldest of which, dating from the 14th-15th centuries, are vaulted with stone arches and follow the ground floor plan. The cellars built towards the courtyard and street date from 1601. Above the cellars of the east wing of the house, on the lowered ground floor, is a Gothic hall vaulted with three pairs of unequal-width lunettes from the early 16th century. The window niches in the parallel hall on the first floor also date from the 16th century.

The rear wing with an arcade wall facing the courtyard was probably built in the late Baroque period at the end of the 18th century, and the connecting west wing was not built until the 19th century. The vaulted passageway to the outer rampart is Renaissance in style and dates from the 16th century. The outer wall of the south wing is formed by a thick wall of the original 14th-century town walls, with two supporting pillars. The eastern part, decorated with sgraffito, was part of a Renaissance house, while the western part, ending with a Neoclassical cornice in the outer wall, dates from the 18th century. The rampart between the inner and outer town walls was gradually modified until 1977 and now serves as a viewing terrace and a venue for seasonal sculpture exhibitions.

The earliest references to the building date back to the late 18th century, when town councilor E. Löffler lived there. In the 19th century, Josef Fuchs' bakery and flour warehouse were located on the ramparts, and the residential part was home to F. F. von Ziegler (Imperial Field Marshal Lieutenant), A. Funke (Imperial Councilor, Mayor of Litoměřice) from 1902, and Florian after him. During the war, there was a small factory on the ramparts, later a carpentry workshop. In the 1950s, the house was considerably dilapidated and had to be completely renovated.

Since 1970, the gallery has also been using the neighboring building at No. 30/9, which serves as a workspace with a library and offices. This house is also Gothic at its core, with cellars from the 14th–15th centuries and a Renaissance room in the rear wing, which was later partly rebuild.

In 1976, the gallery acquired house No. 24, at Mírové náměstí 17, which now houses the museum of the Roman Catholic Diocese of Litoměřice. The late Gothic building from 1513 has preserved steep gabled roofs with complex late Gothic trusses. In the courtyard wing, there is a two-story building with Gothic trusses and a wooden gallery, where selected works from the art brut and naïve art collections are installed.

== Exhibitions and displays ==
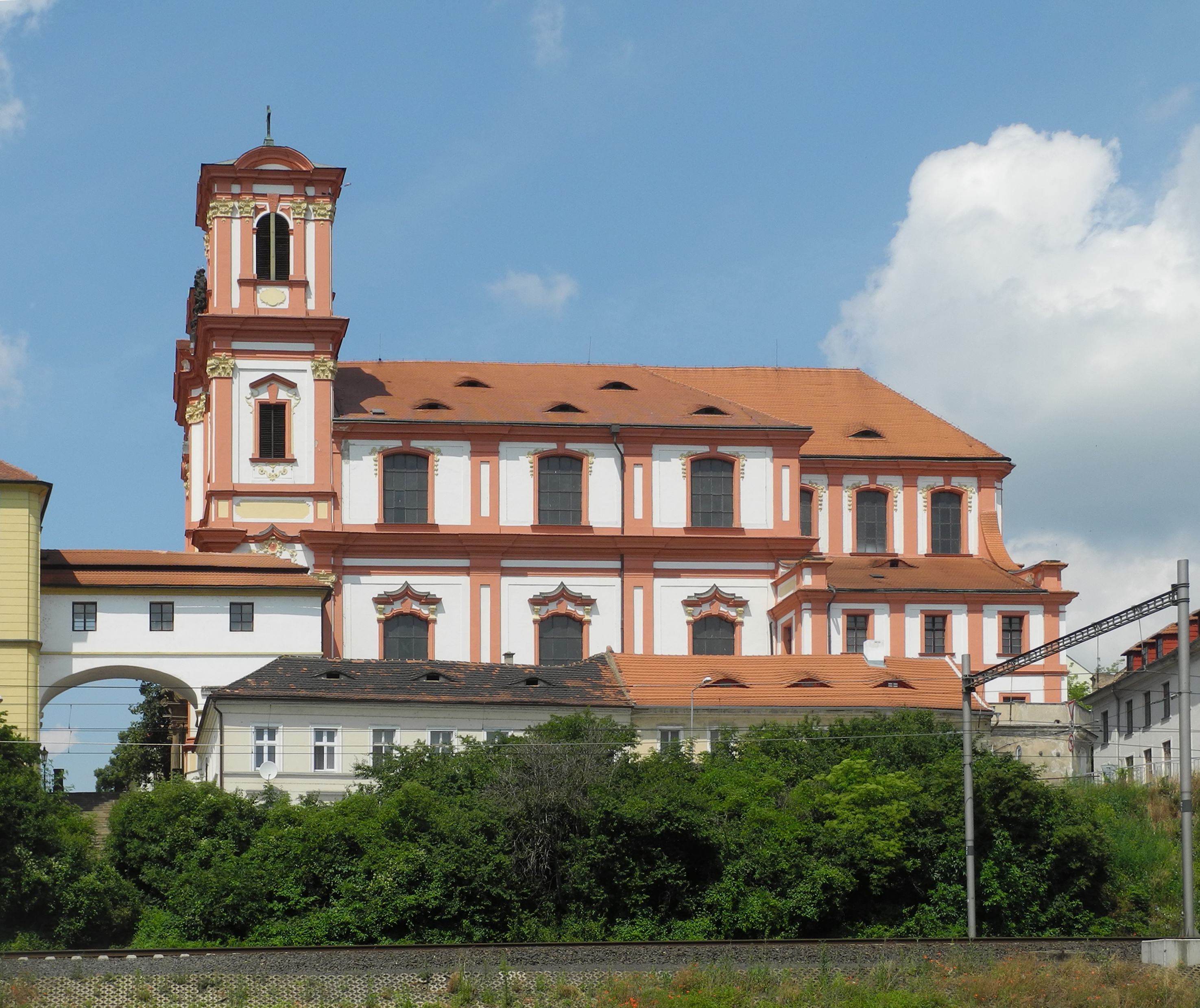
Church of the Annunciation

The main building houses a permanent collection of old art, while the other spaces on the ground floor and first floor are used for short-term exhibitions of contemporary Czech art. The Gothic outer bailey was redesigned by architect Václav Cigler, and during the summer months it hosts exhibitions of sculptures. Additional exhibition space is provided by the rear wing of the adjacent diocesan museum building and the deconsecrated Jesuit Church of the Annunciation.

The former Jesuit Church of the Annunciation, built between 1701 and 1731 according to the plans of Octavio Broggio, was used by the gallery for a decade from 1965 to 1975. It housed carpentry and restoration workshops and part of the depositories, but after 1975 the church was due to be reconstructed. However, the planned reconstruction of the church for the needs of the Litoměřice District Archive, which was then located in unsuitable premises in the Small Fortress in Terezín, did not take place in the end. Since 1992, the church has once again been used by the Litoměřice gallery. After four years of art symposia: "Baroque and Today" and "Open Dialogue," in which the Symposion Foundation participated, the church is used during the summer to host exhibitions of sculptures and paintings. Concerts are also held here occasionally.

The Litoměřice gallery is the only one in the Czech Republic that has been systematically collecting and presenting art brut and naïve art. It has its own exhibition space in the rear wing of the historic building at Mírové náměstí 24. Among the artists represented are Anna Zemánková, Bohumír Komínek, Robert Guttmann, Rudolf Dzurko, Josef Hlinomaz and Marie Kodovská.

The gallery is also very active in publishing. A catalog is usually released for exhibitions curated by the gallery, and the Litoměřice gallery participates in the publication of catalogs for projects organized jointly with other galleries.

== Collections ==
The collection includes works of art from the Middle Ages to the present day.

The permanent exhibition, deinstalled in 2025, focused on the visual arts of the Litoměřice region and northwestern Bohemia from the 13th to the 16th century. The oldest exhibit was a wooden sculpture of a saint with a book (probably Saint Catherine of Alexandria from the late 13th century with remnants of the original polychromy. The highlight of the collection of Czech Gothic painting was a preserved set of paintings from a panel altar by Master of the Litoměřice Altarpiece from 1500–1505. It consists of six panels depicting scenes from the life of Jesus Christ. An important artistic figure of the early 16th century was the so-called Master of the Kadaň Crucifixes, who is credited with the sculpture Crucified Christ from the extinct village of Bystřice near Kadaň. According to recent findings, the Madonna of Litoměřice is the work of a woodcarver from Franconia.

The gallery exhibited altars by important artists active in the first half of the 16th century in Northern Bohemia – Master of the Slavětín Altar (Altar with the Transfiguration of Christ, before 1540) and Master of the Štětí Altarpiece (Ark of Štětí, 1520–1530). Master IW, a pupil of Lucas Cranach the Elder, who is represented in the exhibition by the painting The Beheading of St. Catherine and an altar wing with St. Sigismund and four female saints, is an artist with a clear Renaissance style.

The collection of Baroque art featured important artists of the period – Petr Brandl, Norbert Grund, Jan Kupecký, Jan Jakub Hartmann and others. The following works of art from the 19th and early 20th centuries, represented by artists such as Ludvík Kohl, Adolf Kosárek, Josef Mánes, August Bedřich Piepenhagen, Josef Matěj Navrátil, Antonín Chittussi, and Václav Brožík were also exhibited. As part of its acquisition activities, the gallery has also added paintings by Antonín Hudeček, František Kaván, Bohumil Kubišta and Václav Špála to its collections.

=== Notable works ===
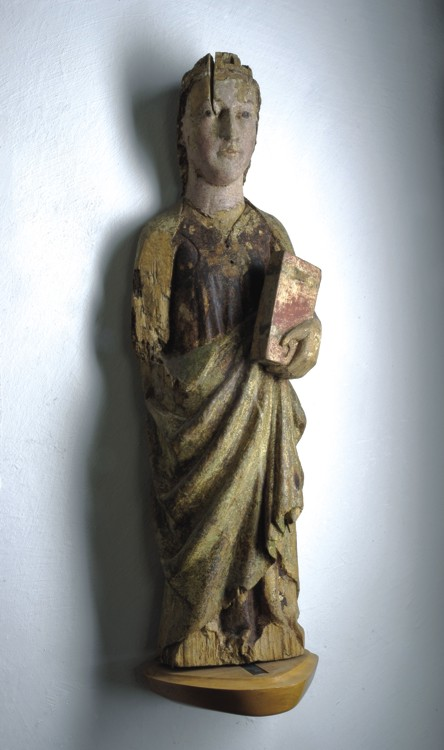
Saint with a Book, late 13th century

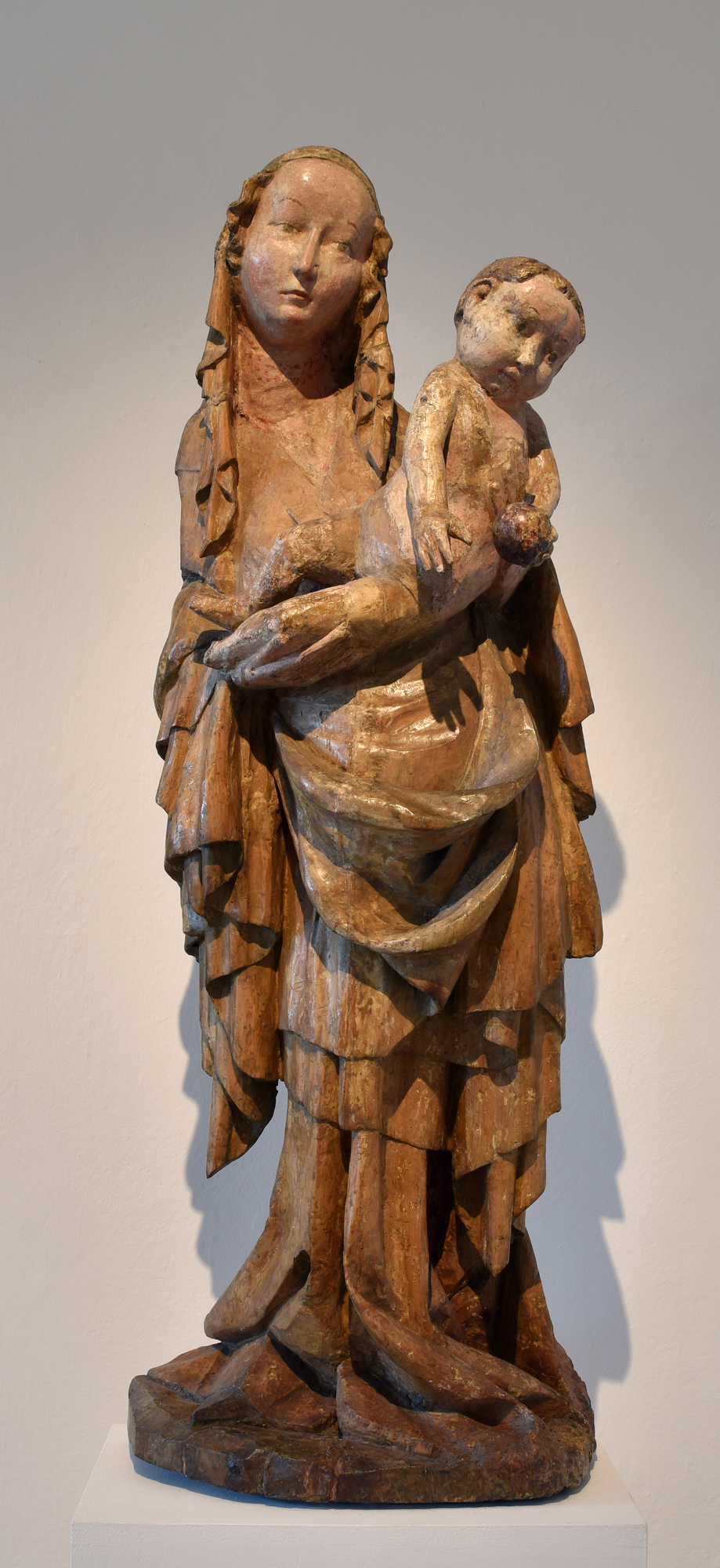
Madonna from Zadní Lhota, early 15th century

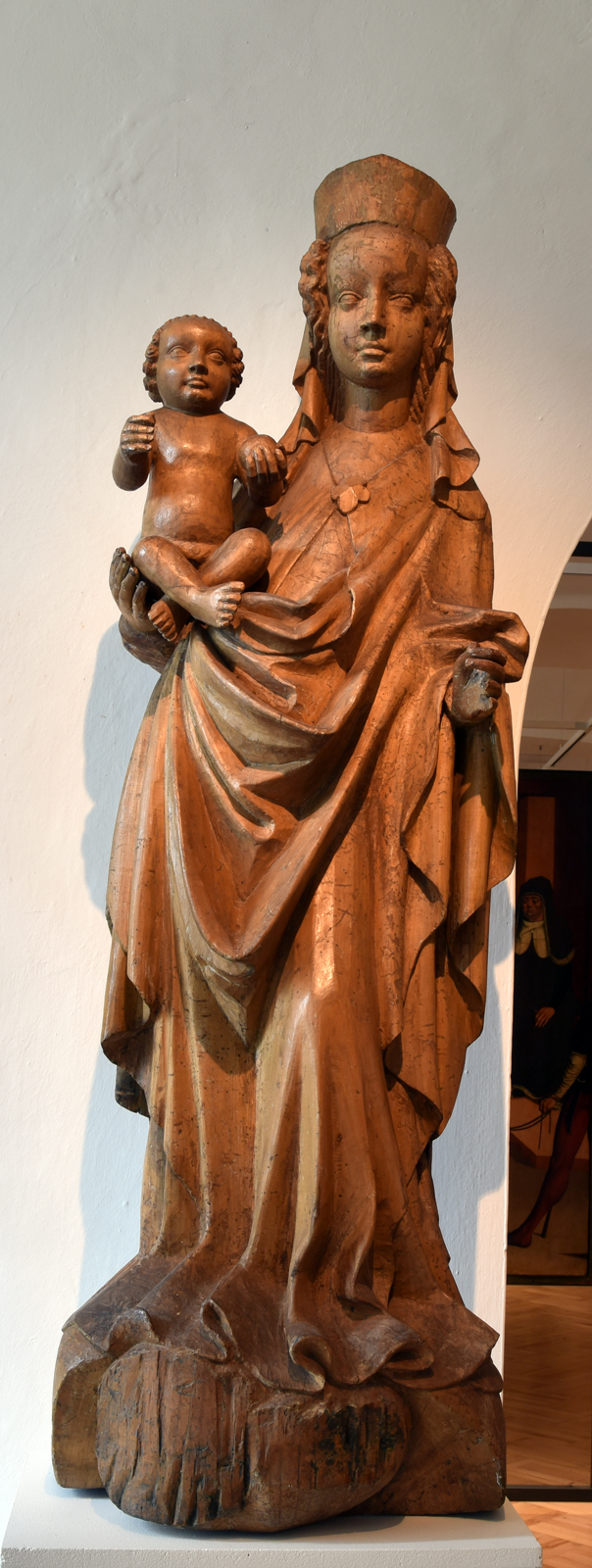
Assumpta from Račice, 30s of the 15th century

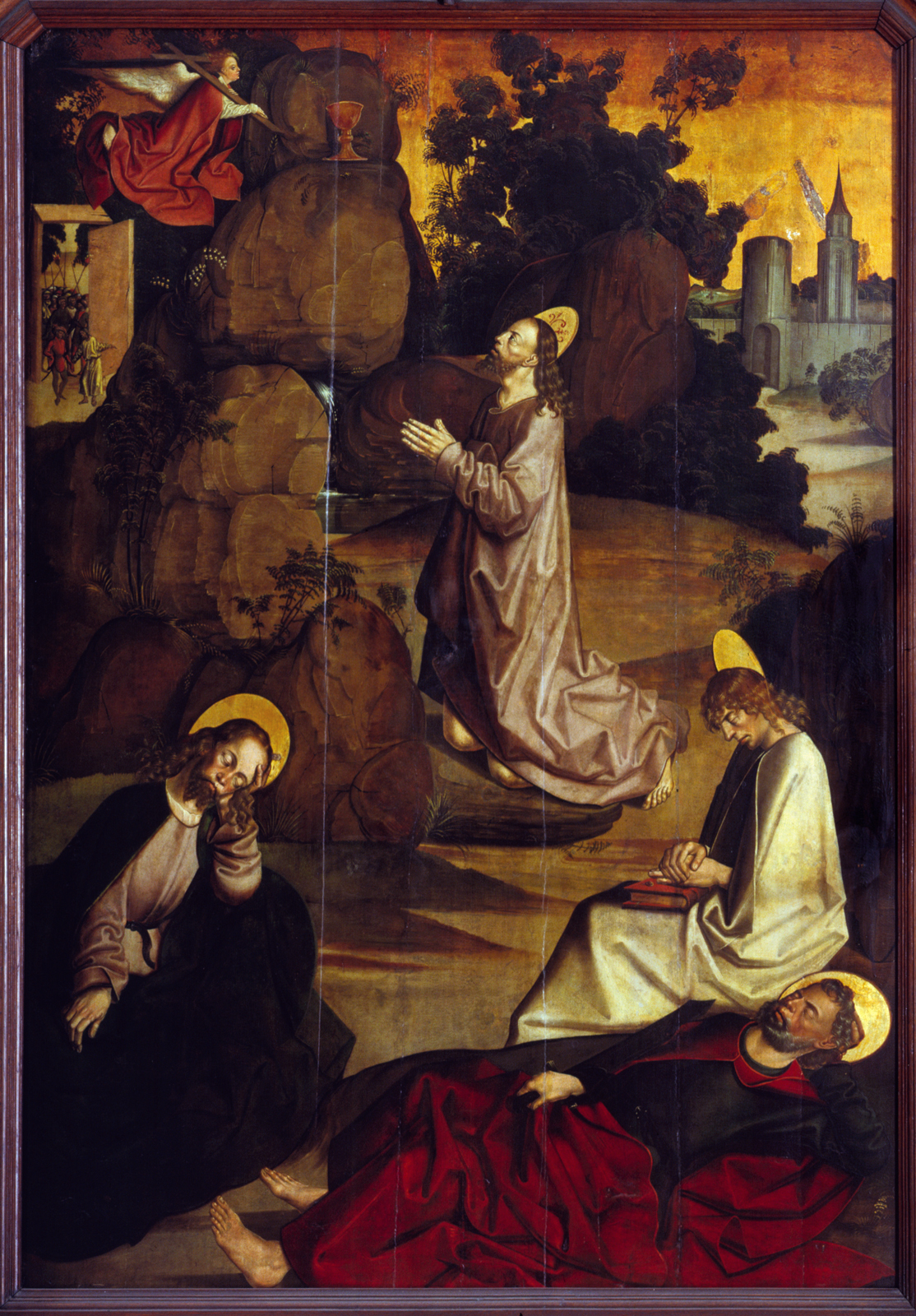
Litoměřice Altarpiece, Christ on Mount Olivet, around 1505

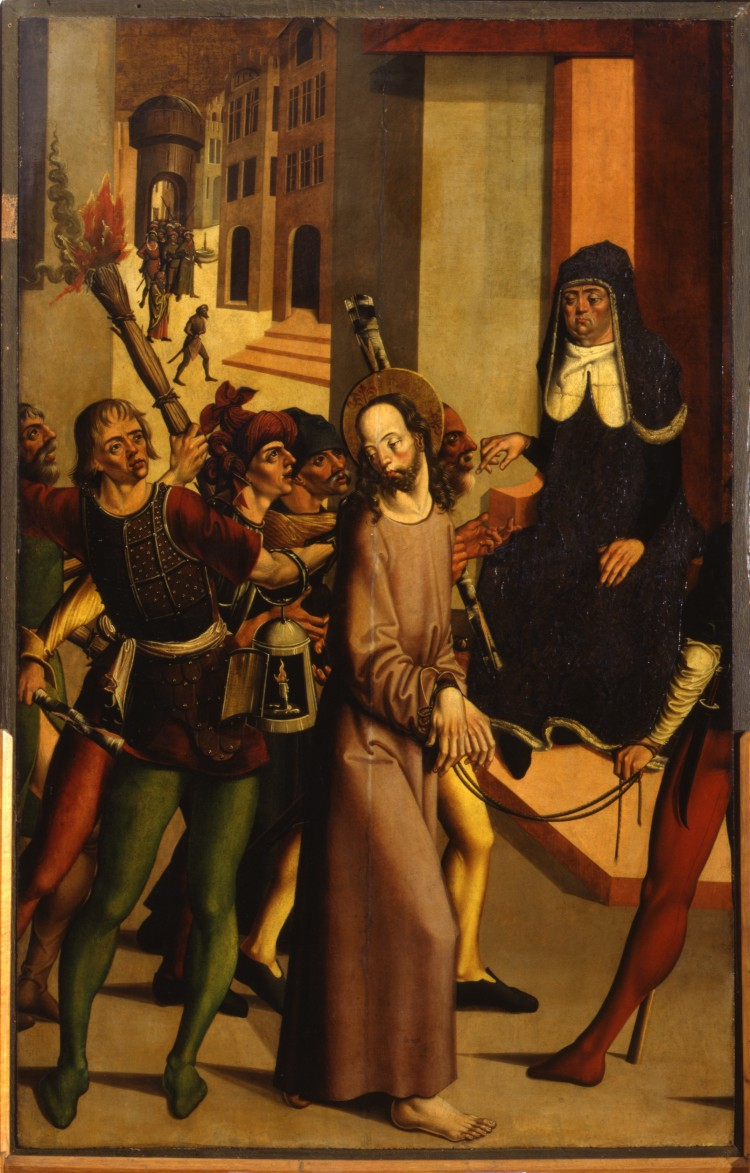
Litoměřice Altarpiece, Christ before Caiaphas, around 1505

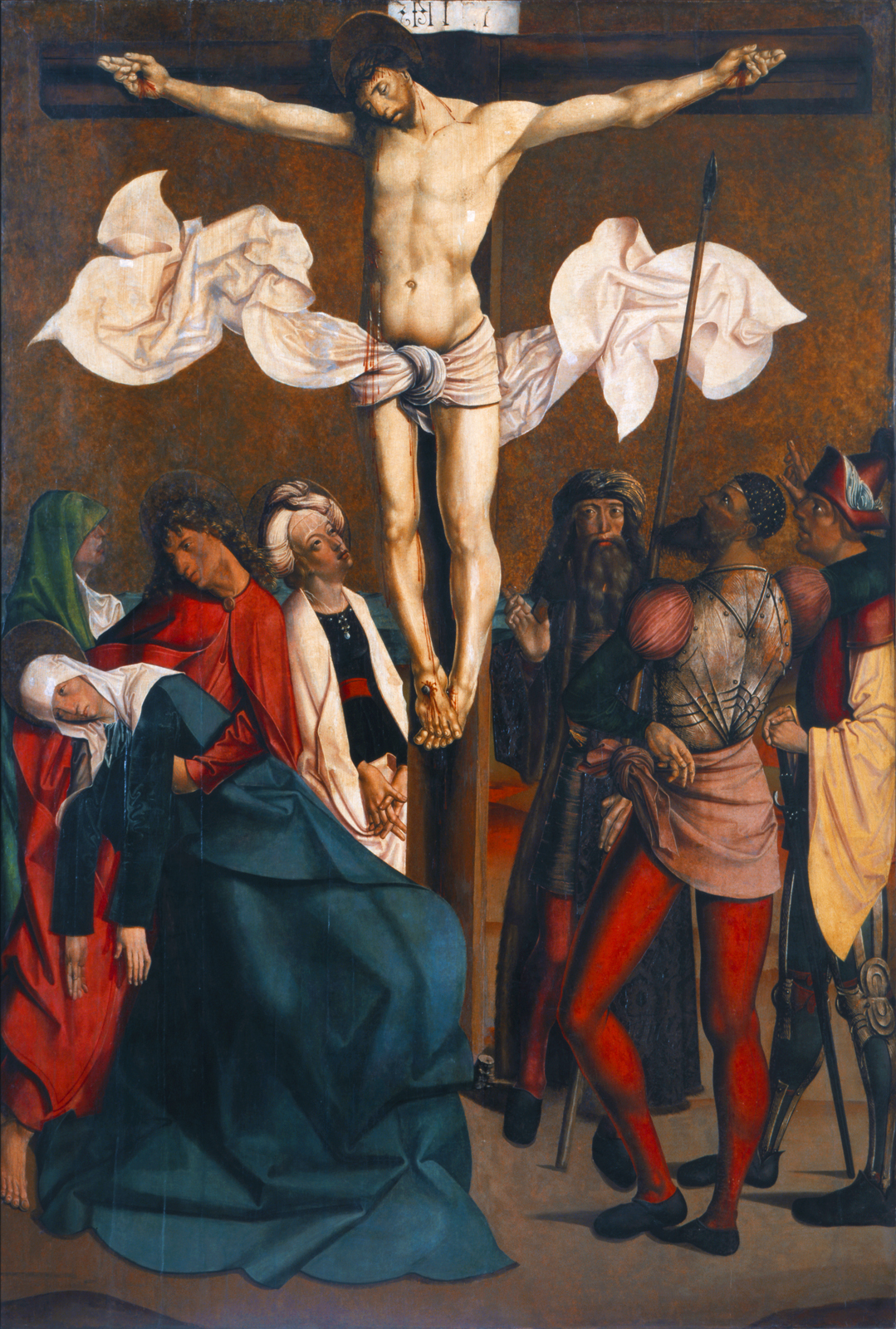
Litoměřice Altarpiece, Crucifixion, around 1505

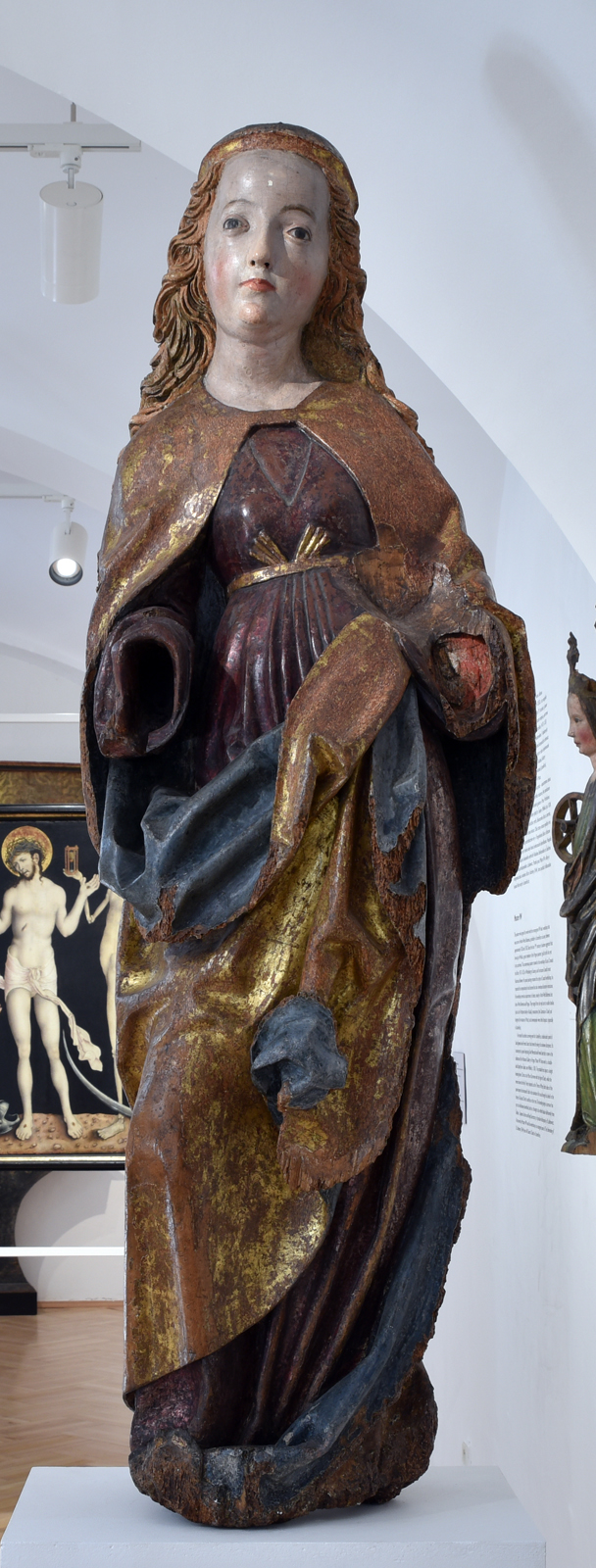
Madonna of Litoměřice, around 1520

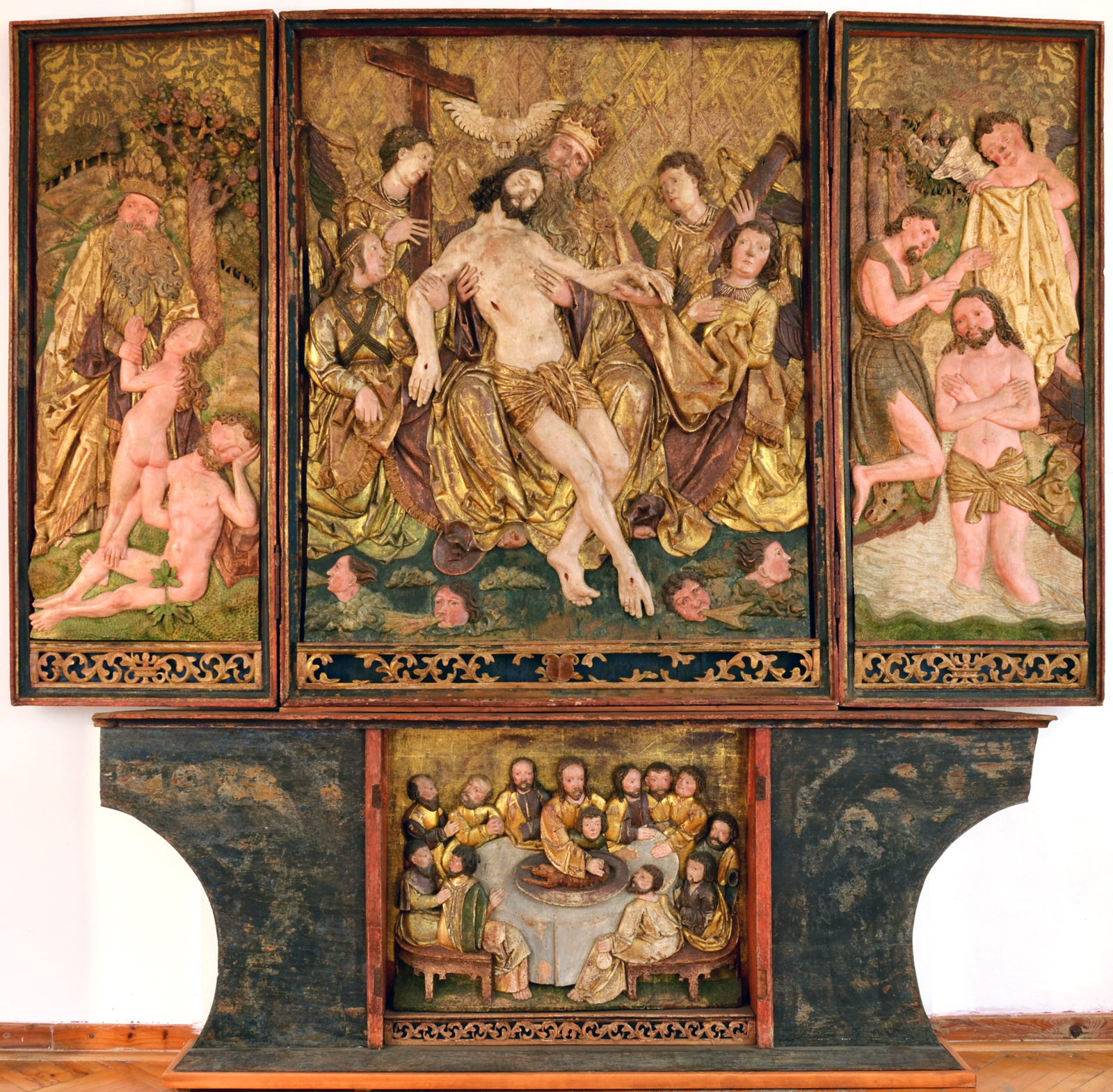
Master of the Štětí Altarpiece, Ark of Štětí, 1520–1530

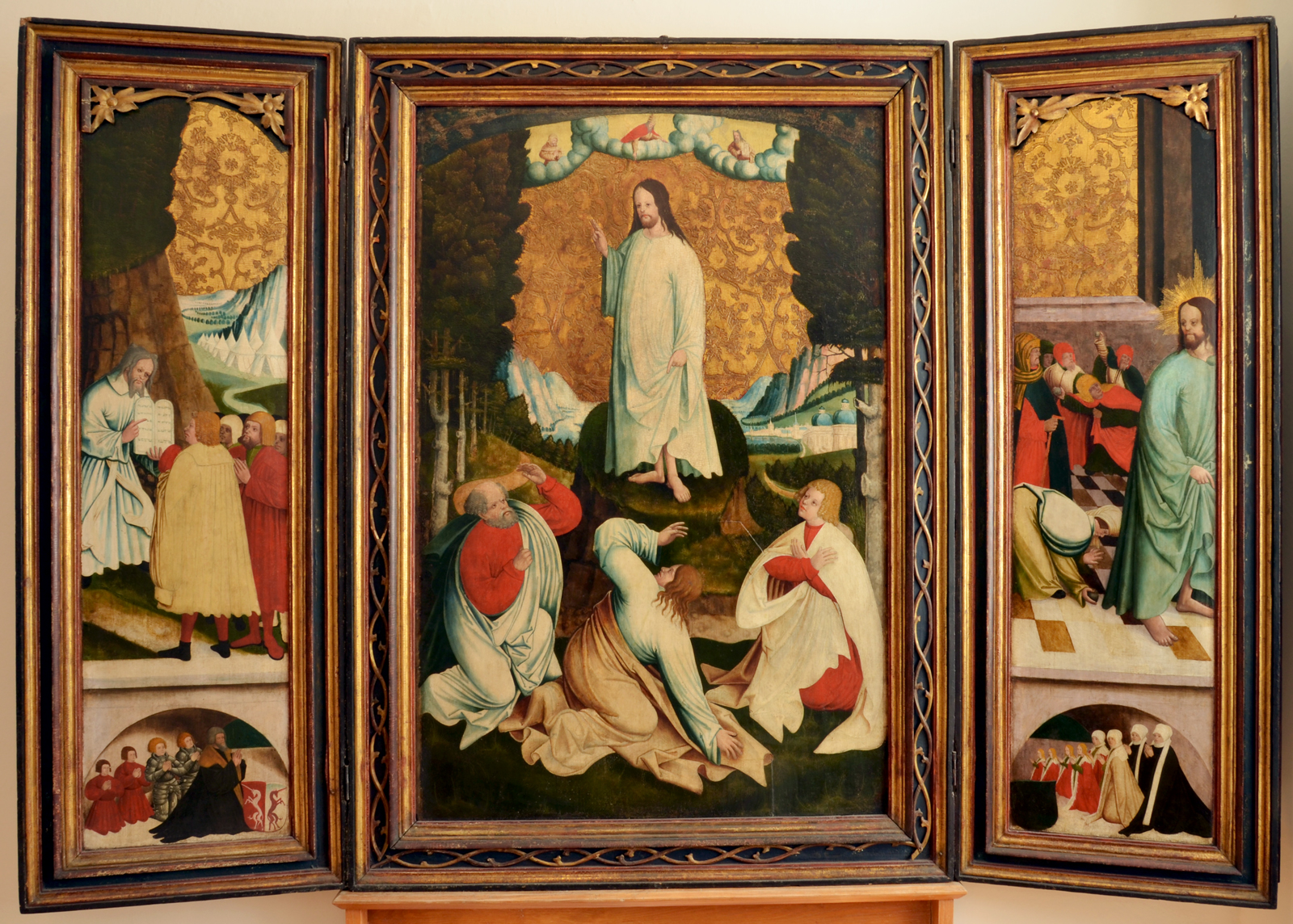
Master of the Slavětín Altar, Altar with the Transfiguration of Christ, before 1540

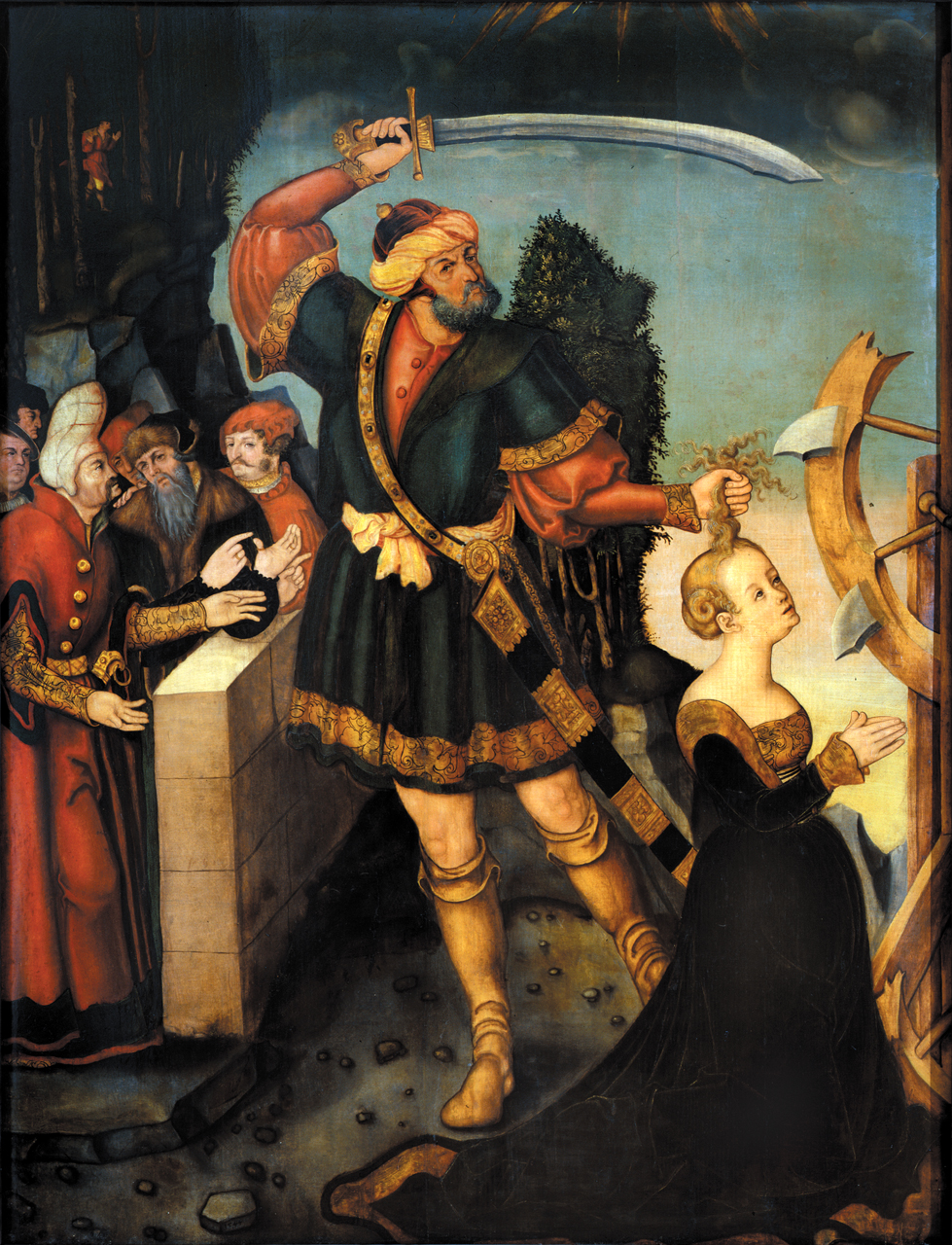
Master IW, Beheading of Saint Catherine, 1520–1540

== Diocesan Museum in Litoměřice ==
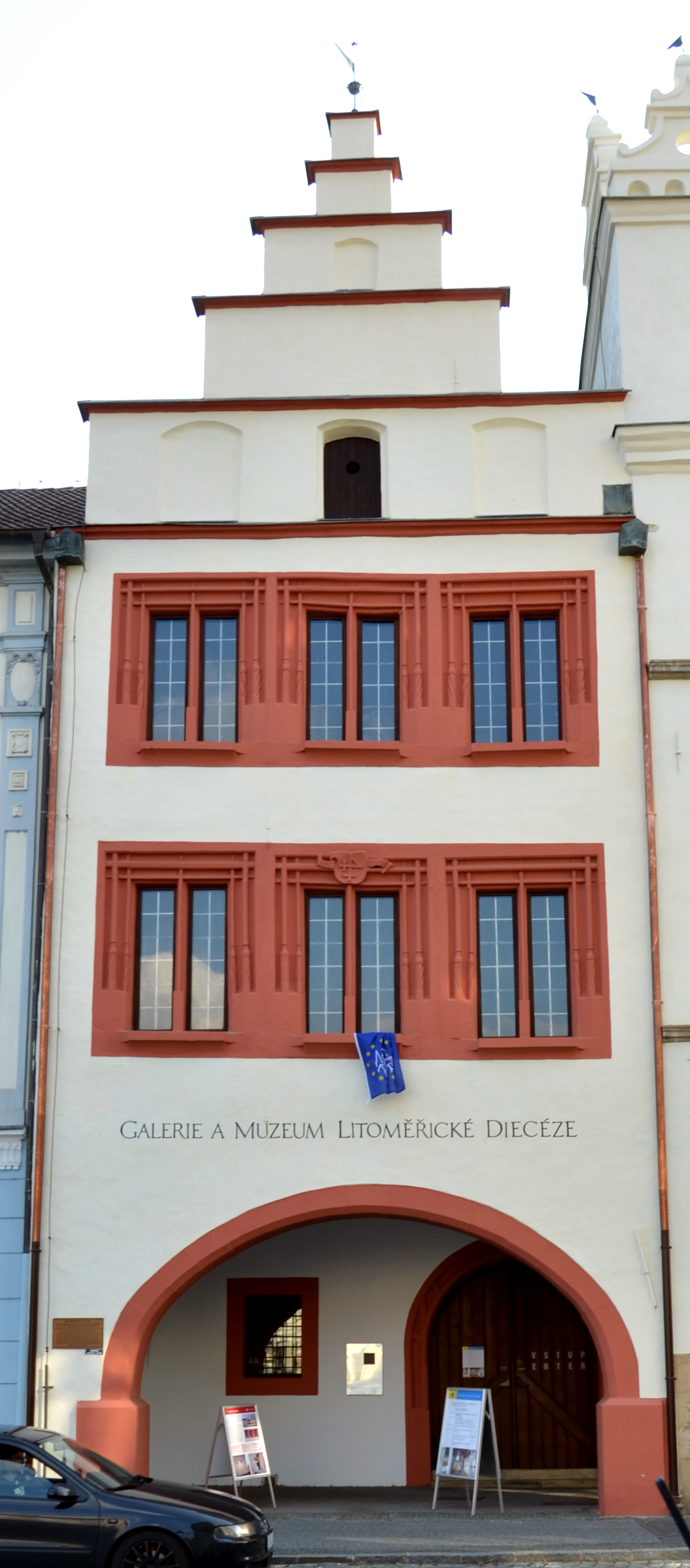
Gallery and Museum of the Diocese of Litoměřice

The Diocesan Museum in Litoměřice at Mírové náměstí No. 24 was affiliated with the North Bohemian Gallery in 1976. Since 1995, works from the collections of the Roman Catholic Diocese of Litoměřice have been on display here. The building is medieval, originally two stories high, with a maashaus on the ground floor and arcades. The gable above the window on the first floor is dated 1513. The original Museum of the Litoměřice Bishopric was founded in 1885 as the oldest of its kind in Austria-Hungary. The museum's activities were interrupted during the communist regime. It was reopened to the public after the Velvet Revolution in November 1989. However, the museum's collection was formed much earlier, as early as 1655, when the Roman Catholic Diocese of Litoměřice was established.

The oldest works of art on display here are three stone Romanesque statues of the evangelists and a stone head with remnants of polychromy from the Church of St. Peter and Paul in nearby Žitenice from around 1180–1190. An exceptional work is the Dutch piece – a panel entitled Madonna in the Enclosed Garden from 1494 by Master of the Tiburtine Sibyl – the depicted theme is related to the Old Testament biblical Song of Songs of King Solomon. Also on display is the embroidery The Entombment of Christ, a panel painting entitled "Saint Anthony the Hermit" by Lucas Cranach the Elder, a leading painter of the German Renaissance. Czech Baroque is represented by Karel Škréta with his painting Saint Matthew from 1666, painted for the church in Křešice. Other masterpieces in the diocesan collection include the paintings "The Dream of Saint James" by Wenzel Lorenz Reiner and "The Presentation of Christ in the Temple" by Anton Kern. Matyáš Bernard Braun is represented by two seraphim from the church in Horky nad Jizerou. The exhibition also presents artistic crafts – chalices, ciboria, and chasubles.

=== Notable works in the Diocesan Museum in Litoměřice ===
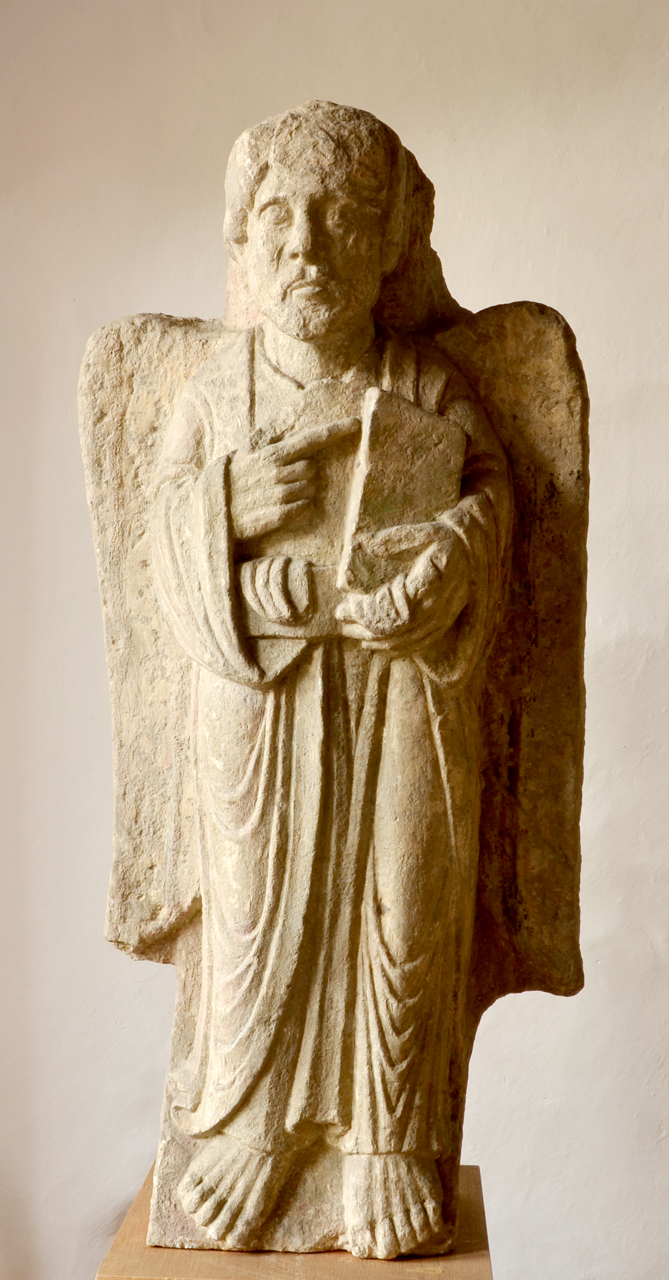
Evangelist from Žitenice I (1160–1180)

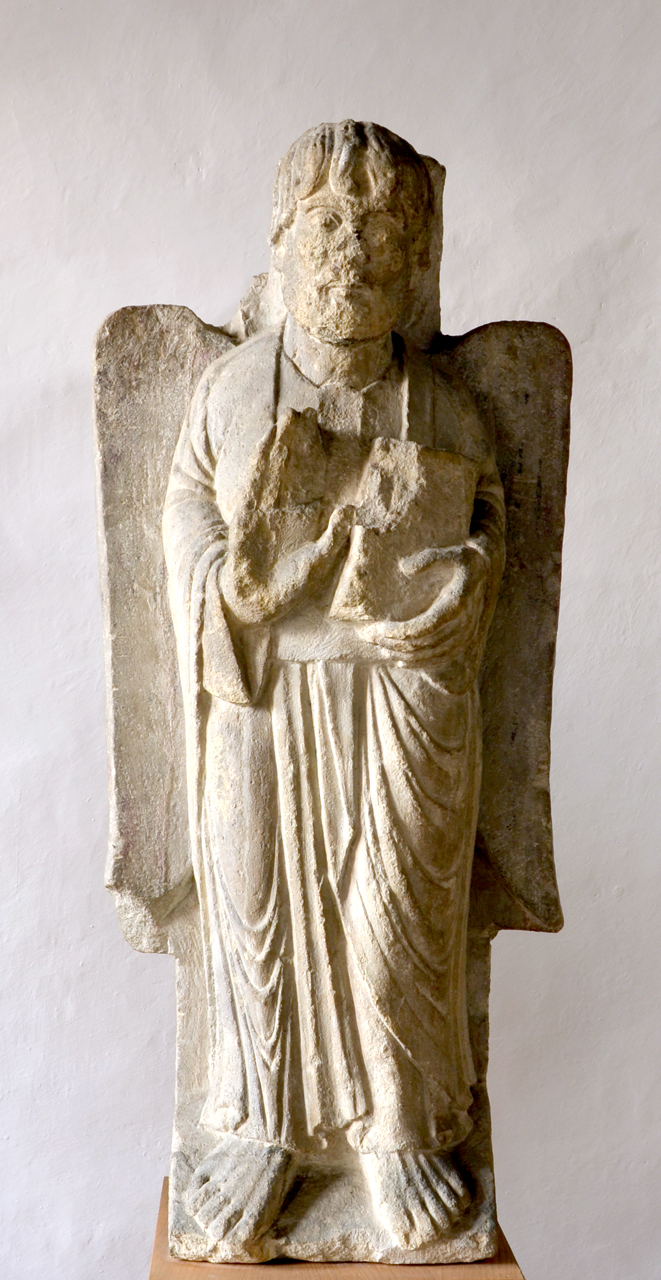
Evangelist from Žitenice II (1160–1180)

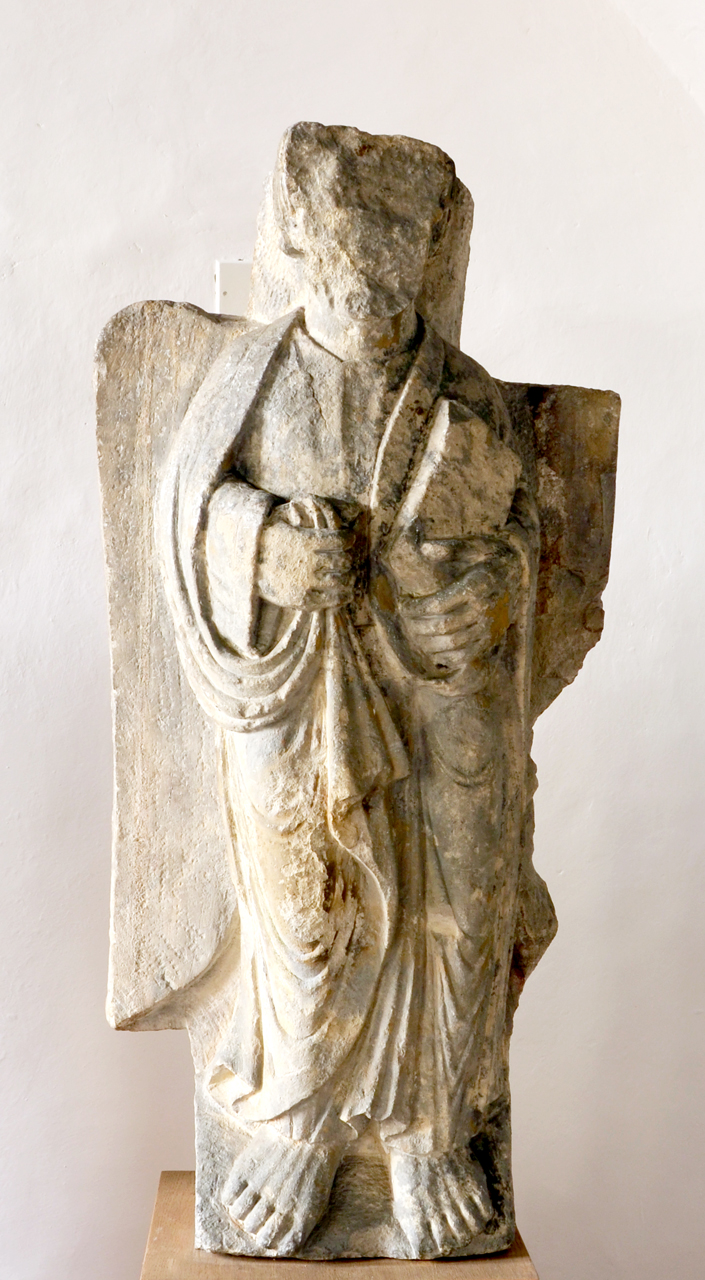
Evangelist from Žitenice III (1160–1180)

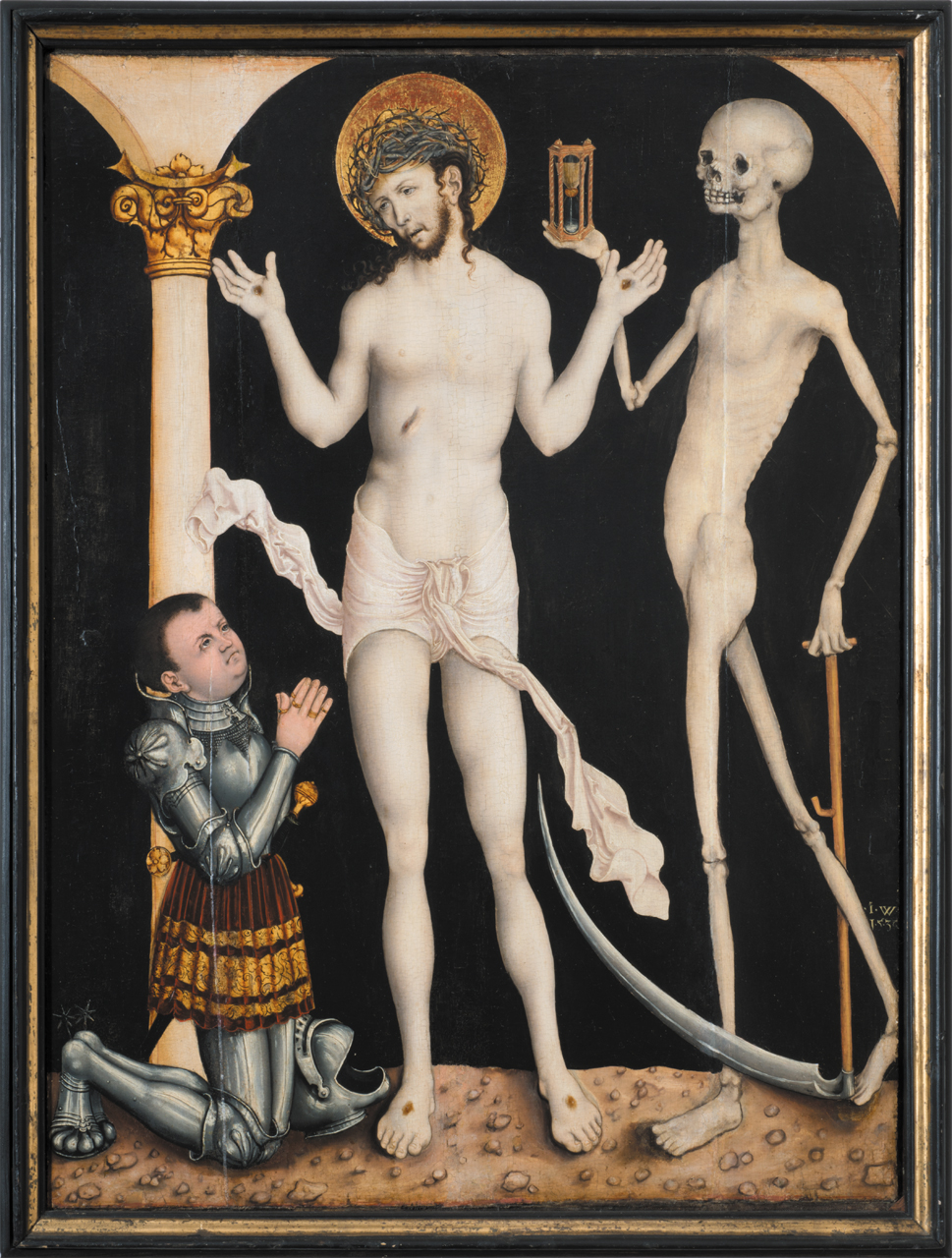
Master IW, Votive painting from Šopka, 1530, obverse

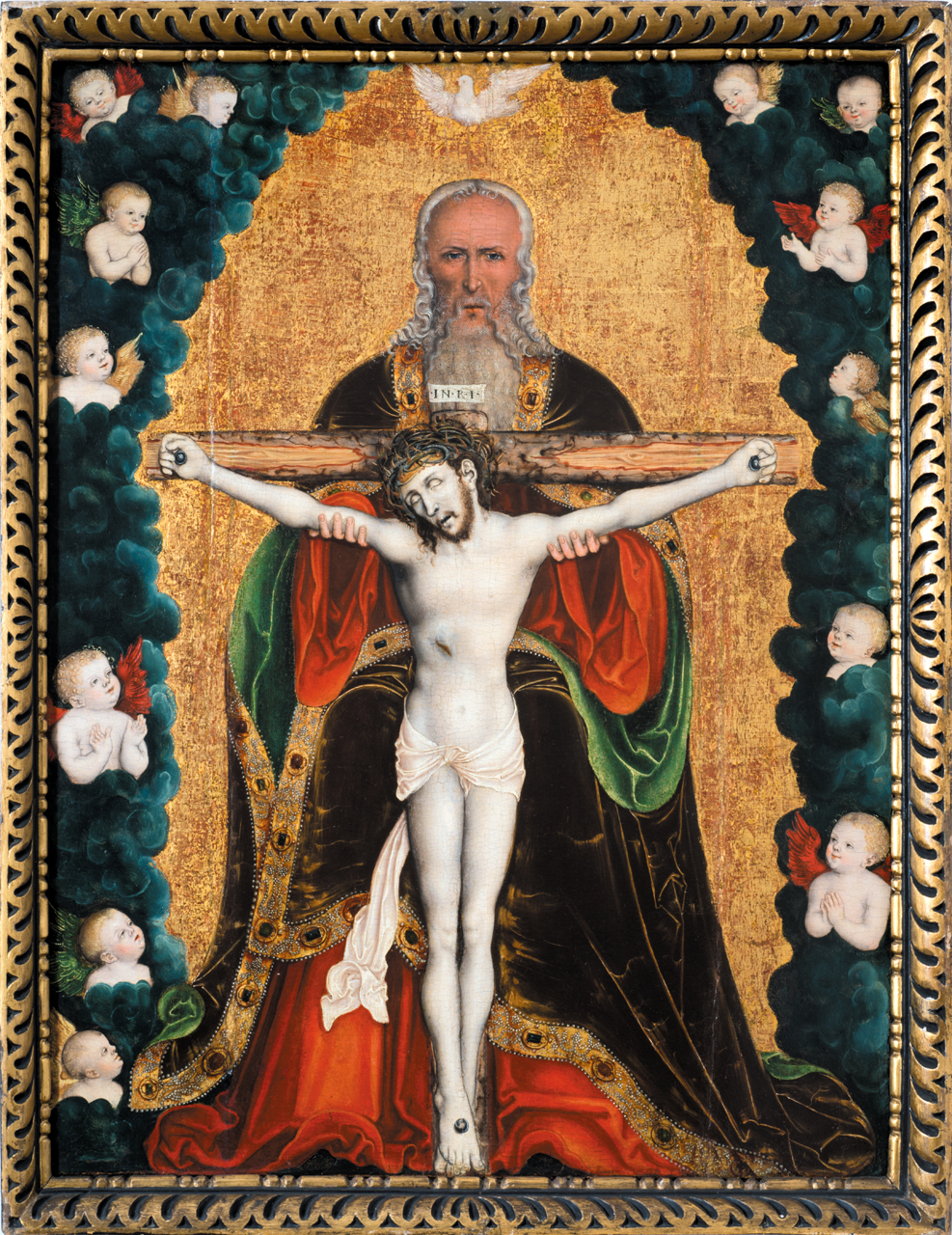
Master IW, Votive painting from Šopka, 1530, reverse

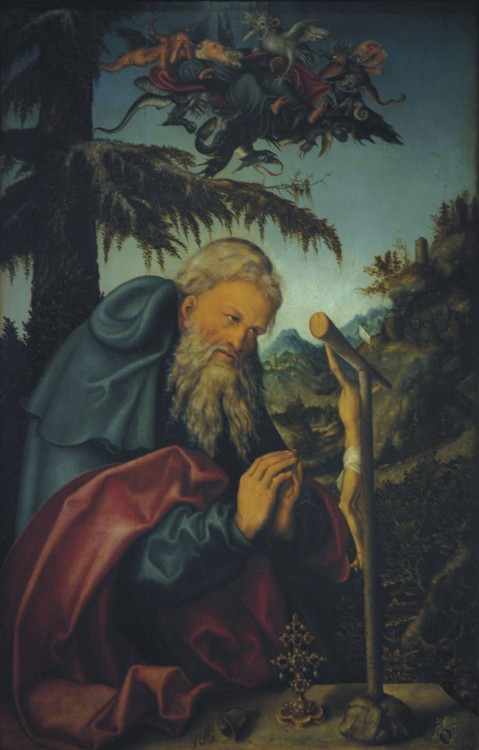
Lucas Cranach the Elder: Saint Anthony the Hermit
