= Robert Guttmann Gallery =

- Galerie Roberta Guttmanna
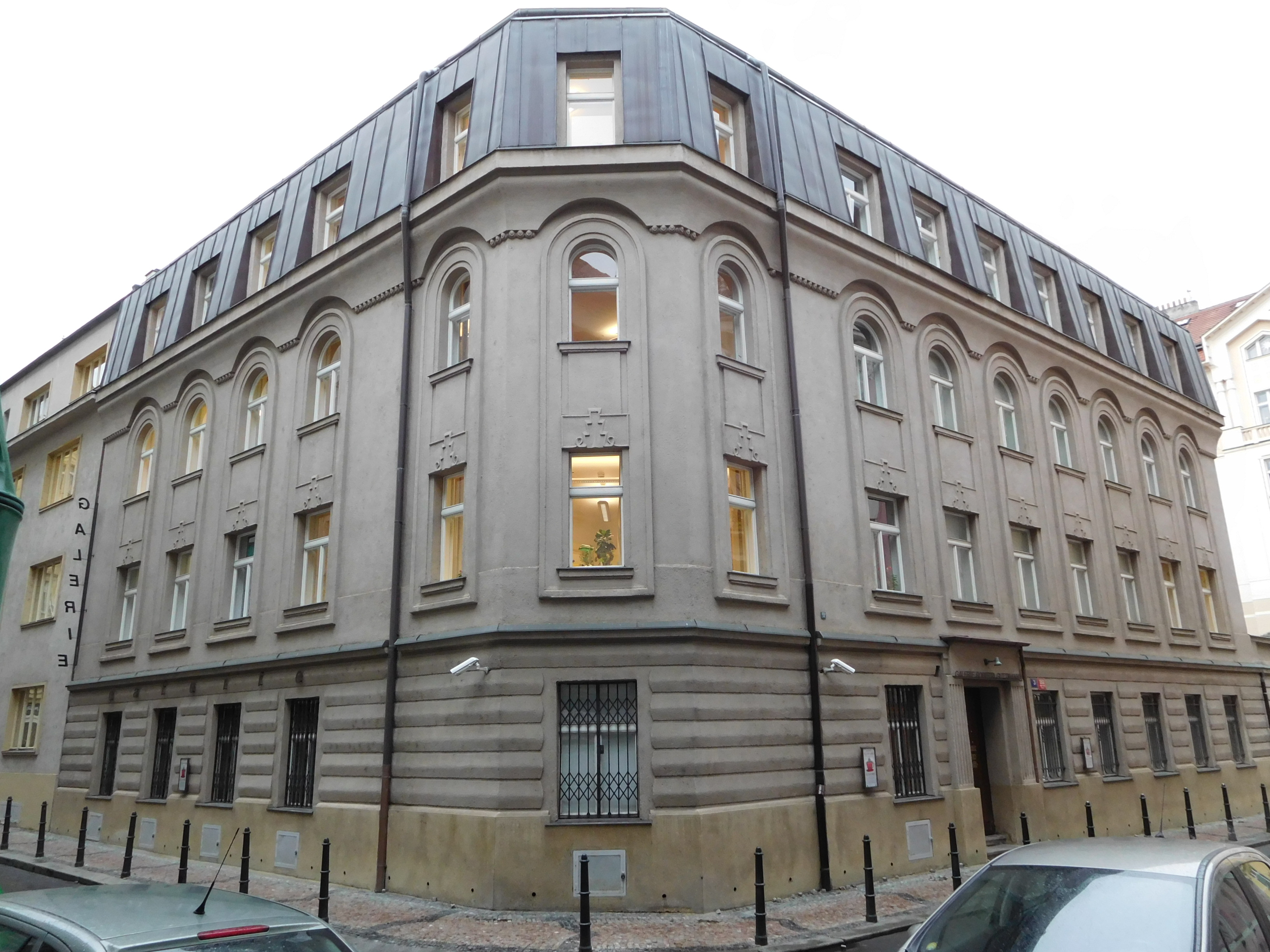
- Main Building of Robert Guttmann Gallery
- Interactive fullscreen map
- Established: 2001; 25 years ago
- Location: U Staré školy 153/3, Prague 1, Czech Republic, 110 00
- Coordinates: 50.0906°N 14.4208°E
- Website: https://www.jewishmuseum.cz/pamatky-a-expozice/pamatky/galerie-roberta-guttmanna/

The Robert Guttmann Gallery (Czech: Galerie Roberta Guttmanna) is an exhibition space of the Jewish Museum in Prague in the capital city of Prague, Czech Republic.

The gallery is located in a building of a former Jewish hospital, which was built next to the Spanish Synagogue according to an architectural design by Karel Pecánek in 1935. The gallery is named after a Jewish naïve artist and a fervent Zionist, Robert Guttmann (1880–1942). The activity of the gallery was launched with an exhibition of his works. The visitors can get acquainted with various aspects of history and culture of Jews in the Czech Lands through temporary exhibitions. Thanks to the temperature and light conditions, valuable and sensitive objects can be exhibited in the gallery.
