= Beer stein =

Drinking vessel

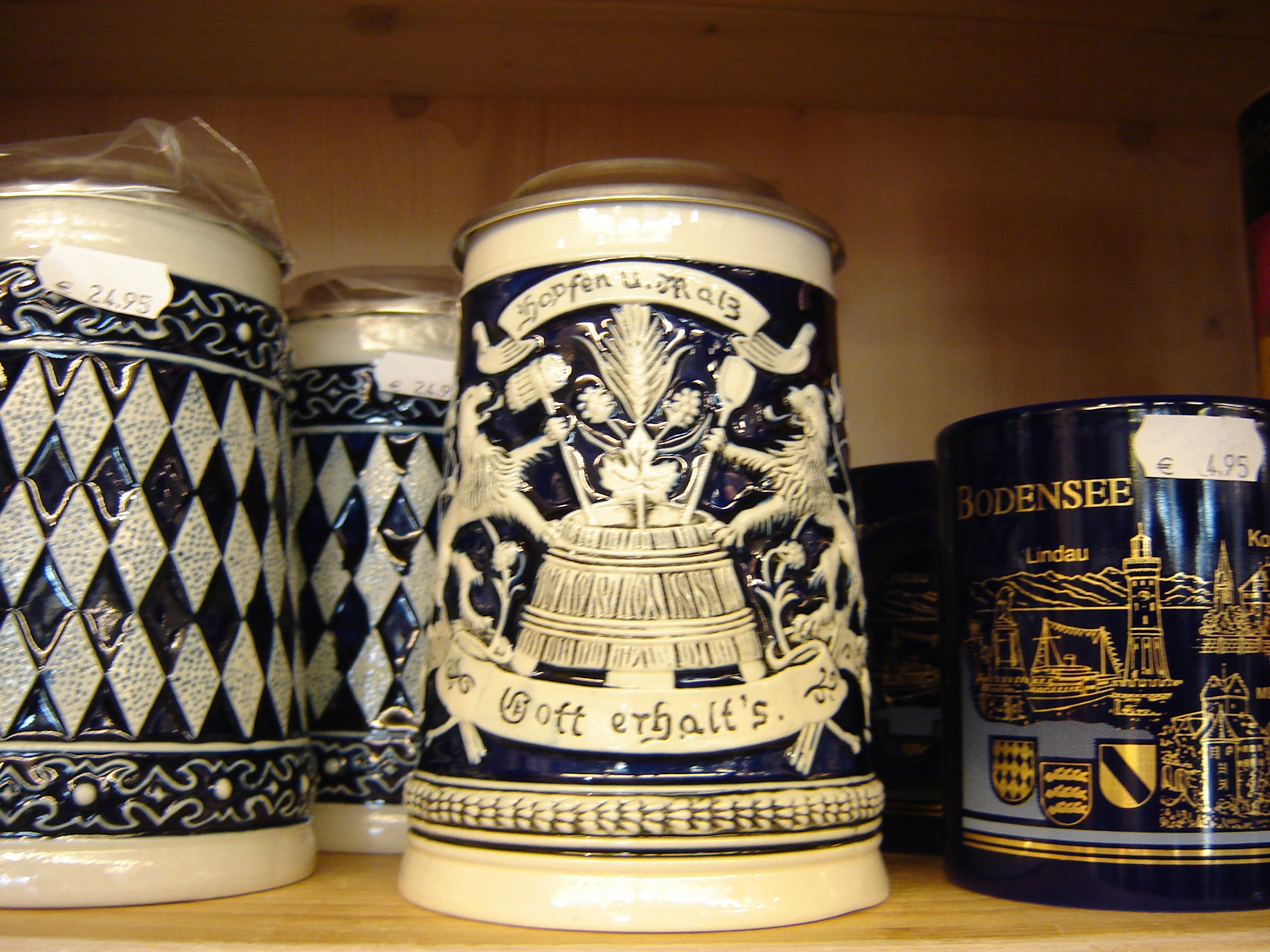
Stoneware beer steins

A beer stein (/ˈstaɪn/ STYNE), or simply stein, is either a traditional beer mug made out of stoneware or specifically an ornamental beer mug sold as a souvenir or collectible.

Such steins may be made out of stoneware, pewter, porcelain or even silver, wood or crystal glass; they may have open tops or hinged pewter lids with a thumb-lever. Steins usually come in sizes of a half litre, a full litre, or historically the similarly sized pints and quarts. Like decorative tankards, they are often decorated in a nostalgic manner with allusions to Germany.

== Etymology ==
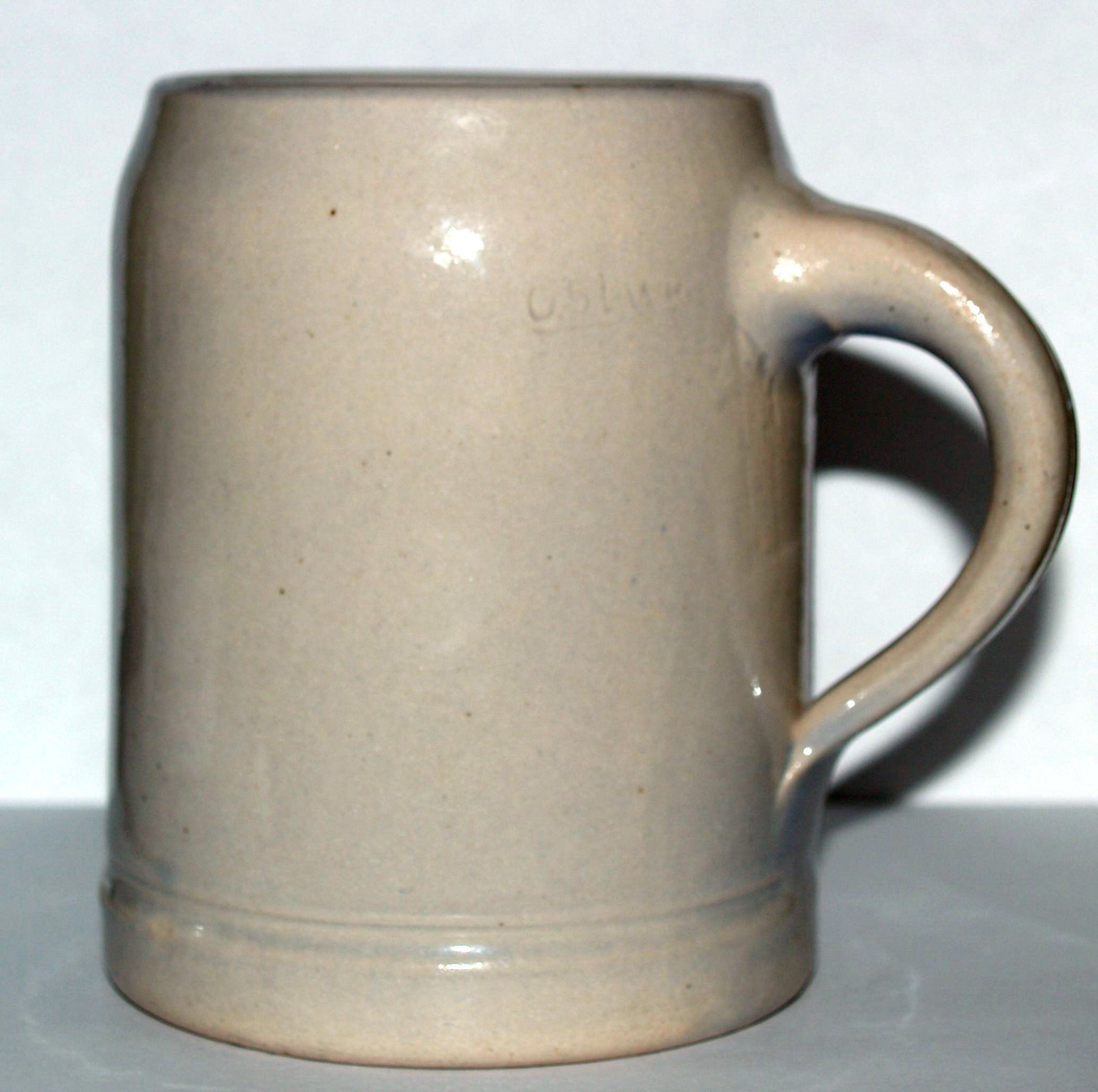
A typical half-litre German Humpen (beer mug)

The English word is attested from 1855. It is borrowed from German Stein, which has – aside from its prevailing meaning "stone" – elder regional meanings "beer mug" and "beer measure of 1 litre or 2 Schoppen".

The word can be compared to English stean "stone or earthen vessel", and Old English stæne "pitcher, jug".

The word Stein alone is not used any more to refer to a beverage container in standard German; rather, Krug, Humpen or, especially in Bavaria and Austria, Seidel are used. Oktoberfest usage is Maßkrug.

== History ==
It is believed by some that the hinged lid was implemented during the age of the Black Plague to prevent diseased flies from getting into the beer. This is unlikely to be true, as contemporaries did not know flies spread the disease. Instead, the prevailing belief was that it was spread through dangerous "miasmas".

The advantage in using stoneware to make steins was that molds could be used to mass-produce elaborately carved steins. On the other hand, glass had the advantage that one could add an artistic touch by including acid etchings, glass staining, or even multicolored overlays. Porcelain's advantage was that a stein fabricator could use molds to make "character steins", steins that had a particular shape modeled after an item or a person. In the 20th century, collecting antique and replicated beer steins became a popular hobby not only among individual people, but in museums as well. Production of beer steins has become substantial in America, but the largest producer of beer steins is Ceramarte of Brazil.

The most traditional area of beer stein production is the Kannenbäckerland in the Westerwald region in Germany. This unique German potters region has been creating beer steins for centuries and is famous among the collectors as the original German beer stein producer.

== Material ==
Beer steins were made primarily with pewter in many areas across Europe (primarily in England), but many steins were known to be made of glass, porcelain, and silver as well. Steins have also been known to have been made out of wood, earthenware, and crystal.

Ordinary German beer mugs have been made out of glass for hygienic reasons since the introduction of glass mugs to the 1892 Oktoberfest. Modern beer mugs, except again decorative or luxury versions, do not have a lid.

Beer mugs (0.5 and 1 litre) are typical for beer gardens and especially the Oktoberfest, where they are popular for their robustness. In other settings, 0.33 and 0.5 litre beer glasses are also popular.

Attempts to replace beer mugs made from glass or earthenware by ones made from plastic (for security reasons) have been variously met with protests, even burnings of mugs and were never successful in the long or even medium term in Germany.

== The lid ==
The lids on beer mugs serve as a sanitary measure, especially to keep insects out of the beer. They are usually made out of pewter, and are usually equipped with a lever that is in reach of the thumb, so that it is possible to grab the mug and open and close the lid with a single hand.

These days beer mats are usually used to cover the glass or mug when required.

== Other forms and synonyms ==
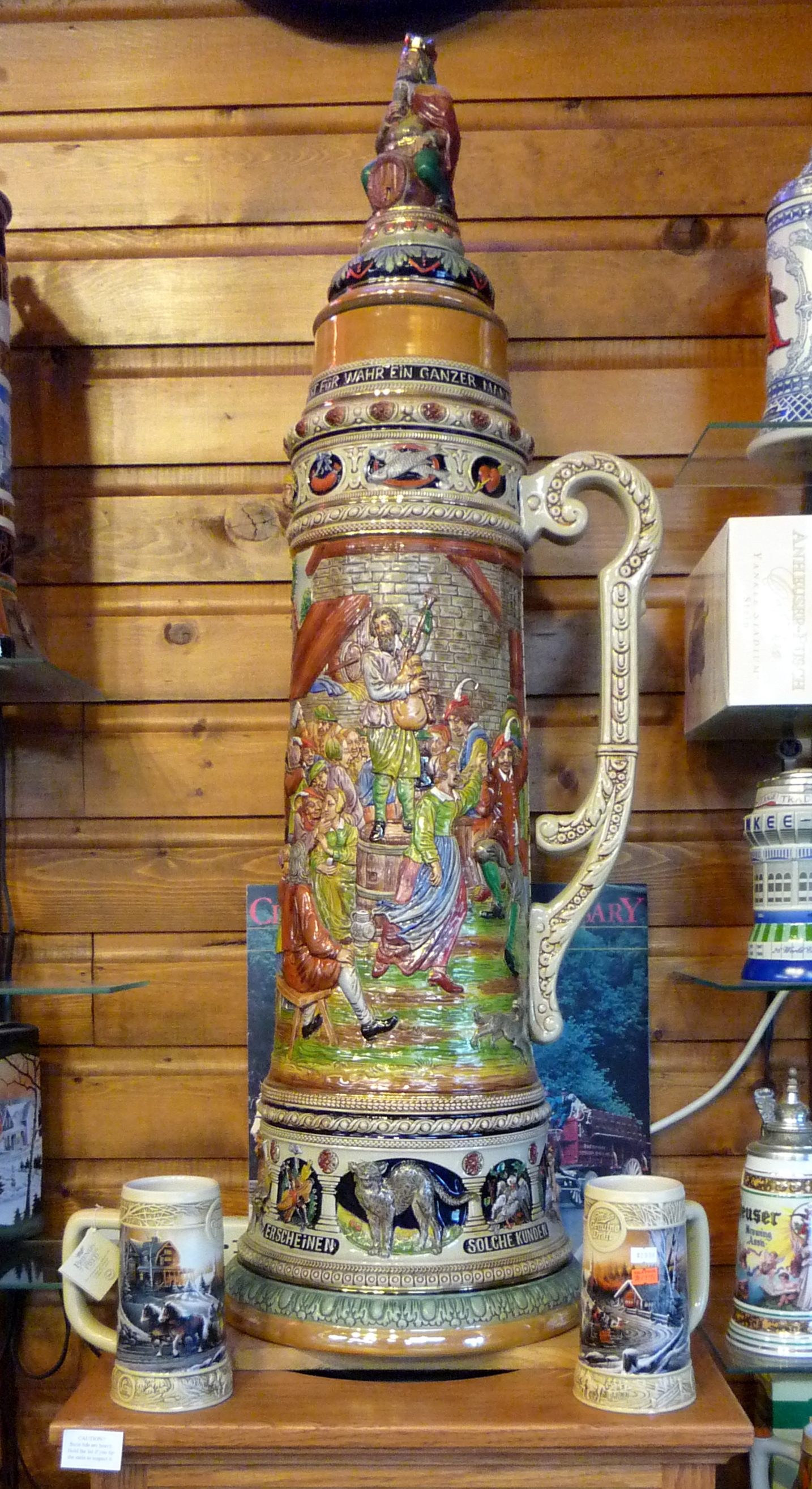
An unusually large German beer stein with a 32-liter (8.45 U.S. gal) capacity that weighs 16 kilograms (35 lb) when empty

In German-speaking regions beer mugs may be known as:

- Bierkrug ("beer mug")
- Maßkrug or Maß (for a one-litre beer mug)
- Humpen
- Adlerhumpen, a tall drinking glass sometimes with covers enamelled with the double eagle of the Holy Roman Empire
- Seidel or Seidla (Franconia, 1/2 litre). The term Seide is also used by the Pennsylvania Dutch in the Pennsylvania Dutch Country.
- Schoppen (Palatinate, 1/2 litre)
- Keferloher, the traditional (but non-embellished) stoneware beer mug, named after the village of Keferloh near Munich where they were originally produced

Considered collectible are traditional designs such as brewery emblems, Bavarian motifs such as Neuschwanstein or the Marienplatz Rathaus-Glockenspiel of Munich, and the official annual Oktoberfest souvenir mug featuring the year's winning poster design.

The use of beer mugs is uncommon in most parts of Northern and Central Germany, and in these regions considered a Bavarian specialty.

== Pictures ==
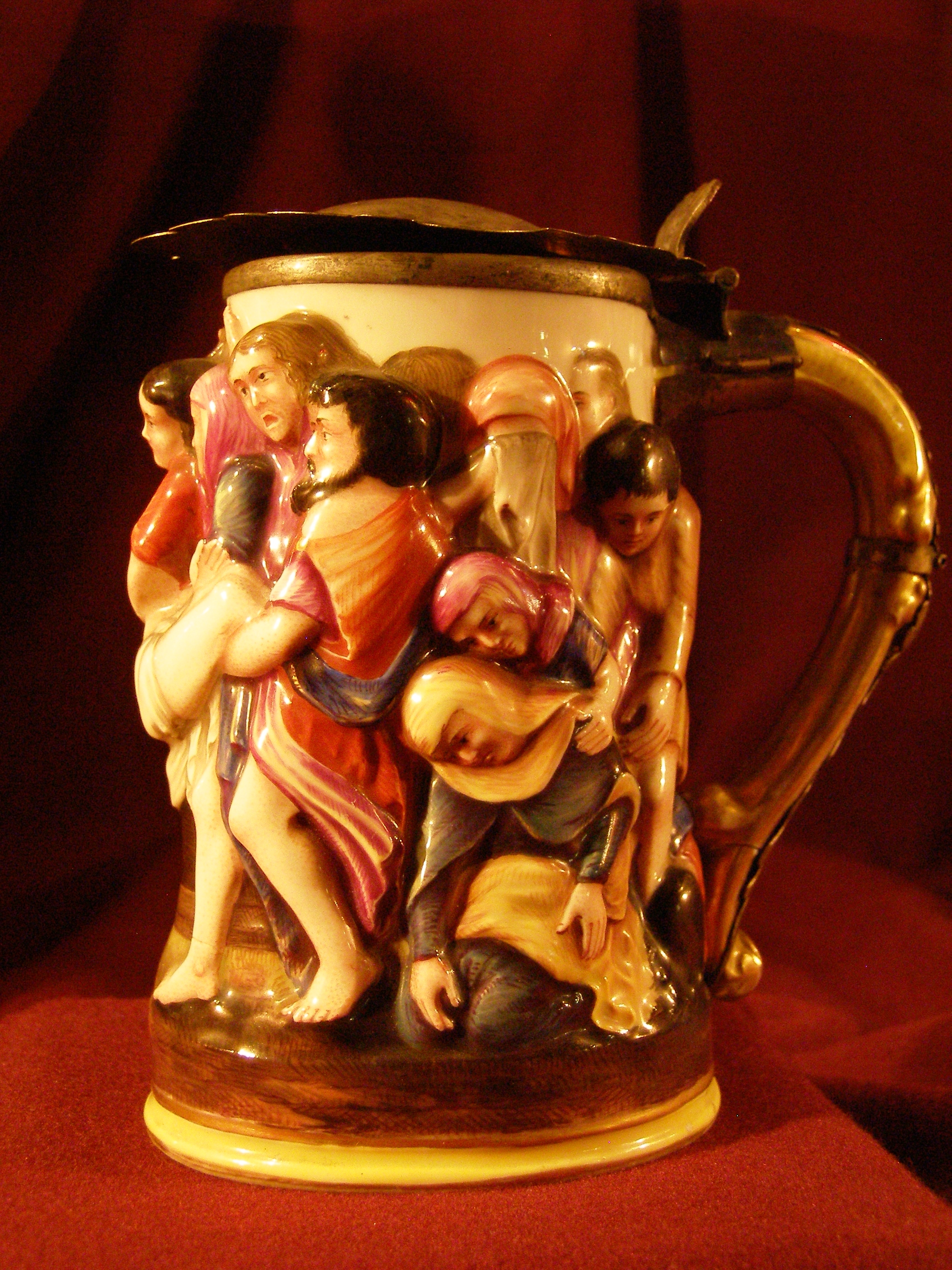
Beer stein made in Poland

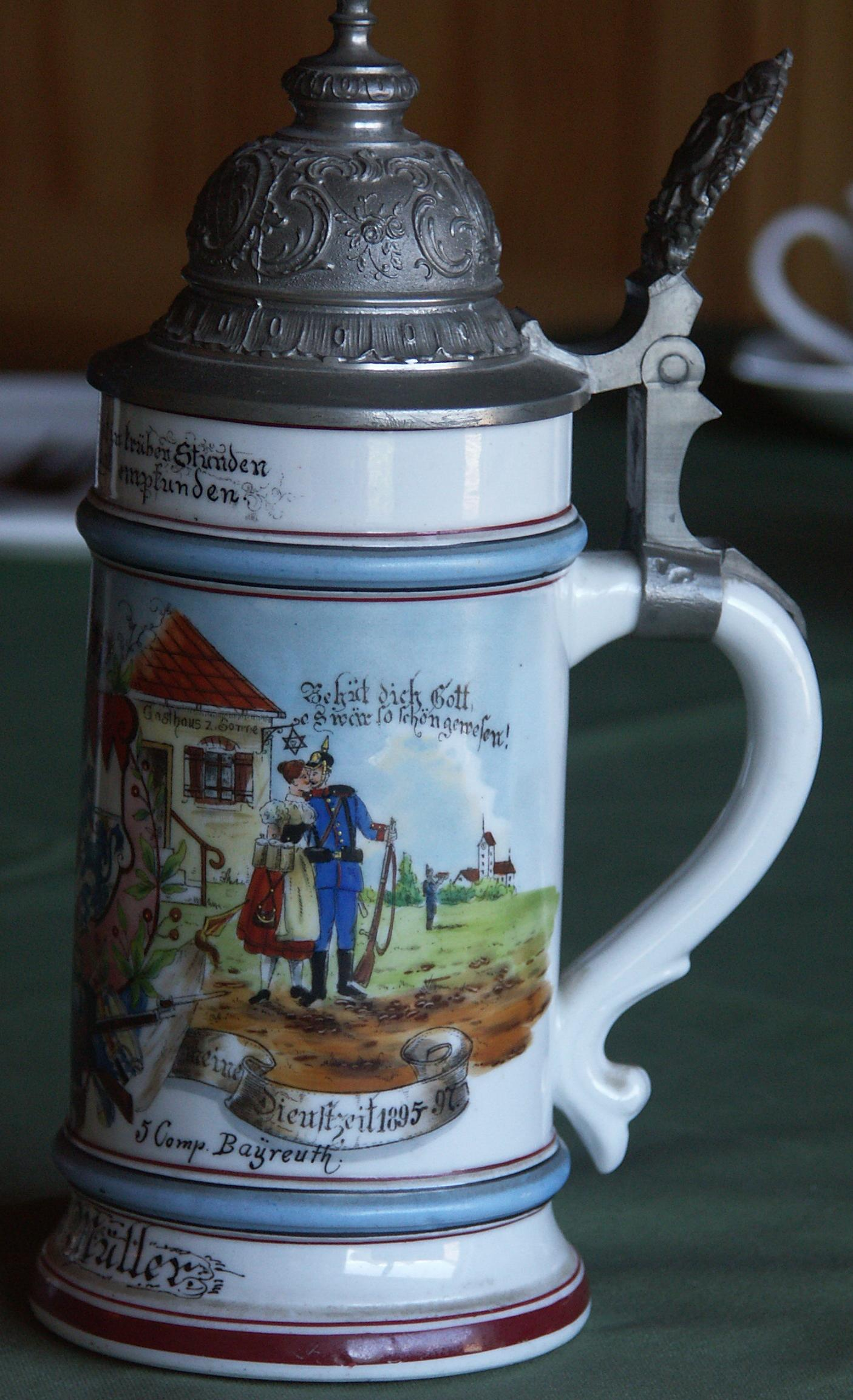
A late-19th-century German beer stein

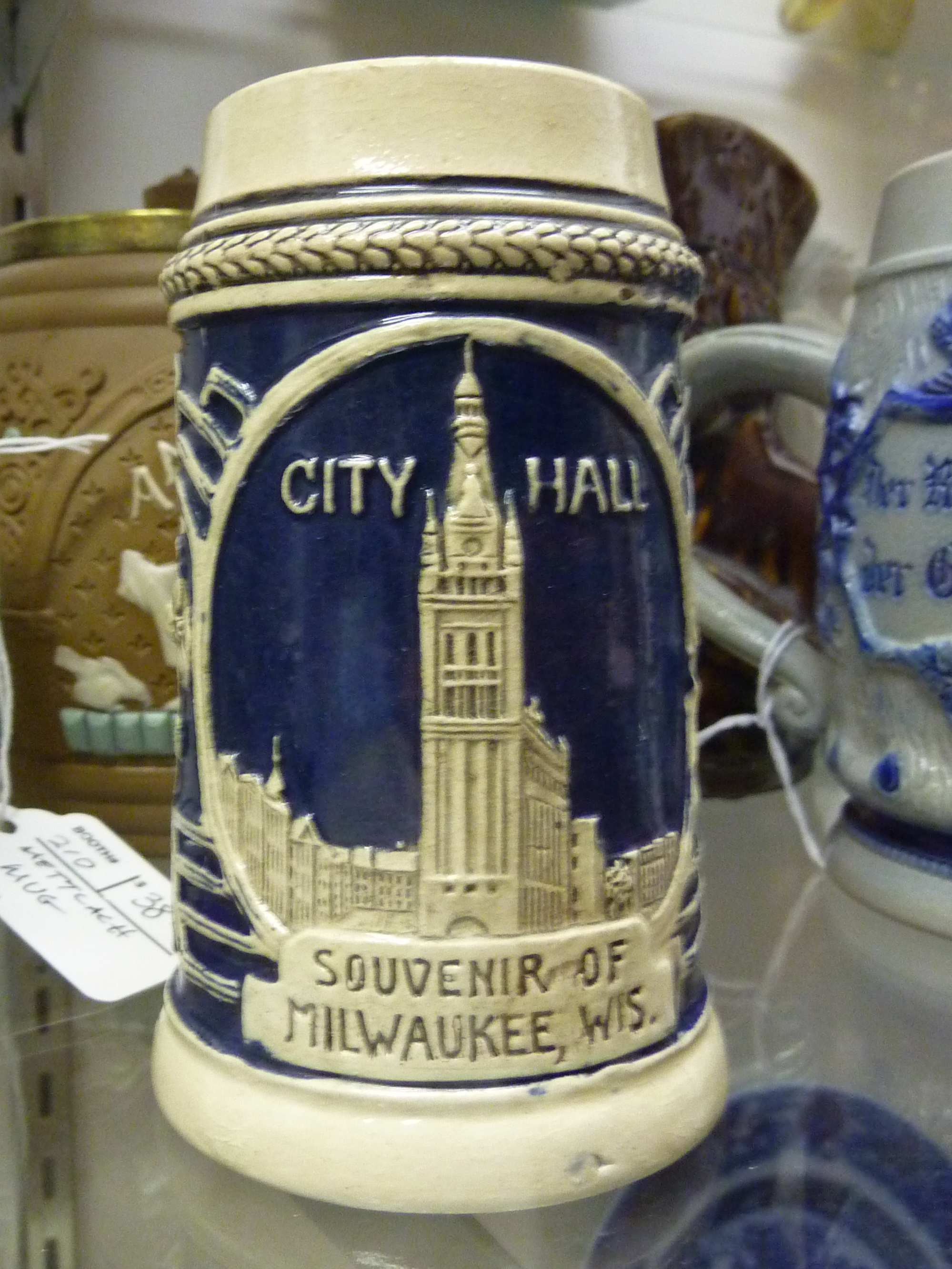
Beer mug commemorating Milwaukee City Hall

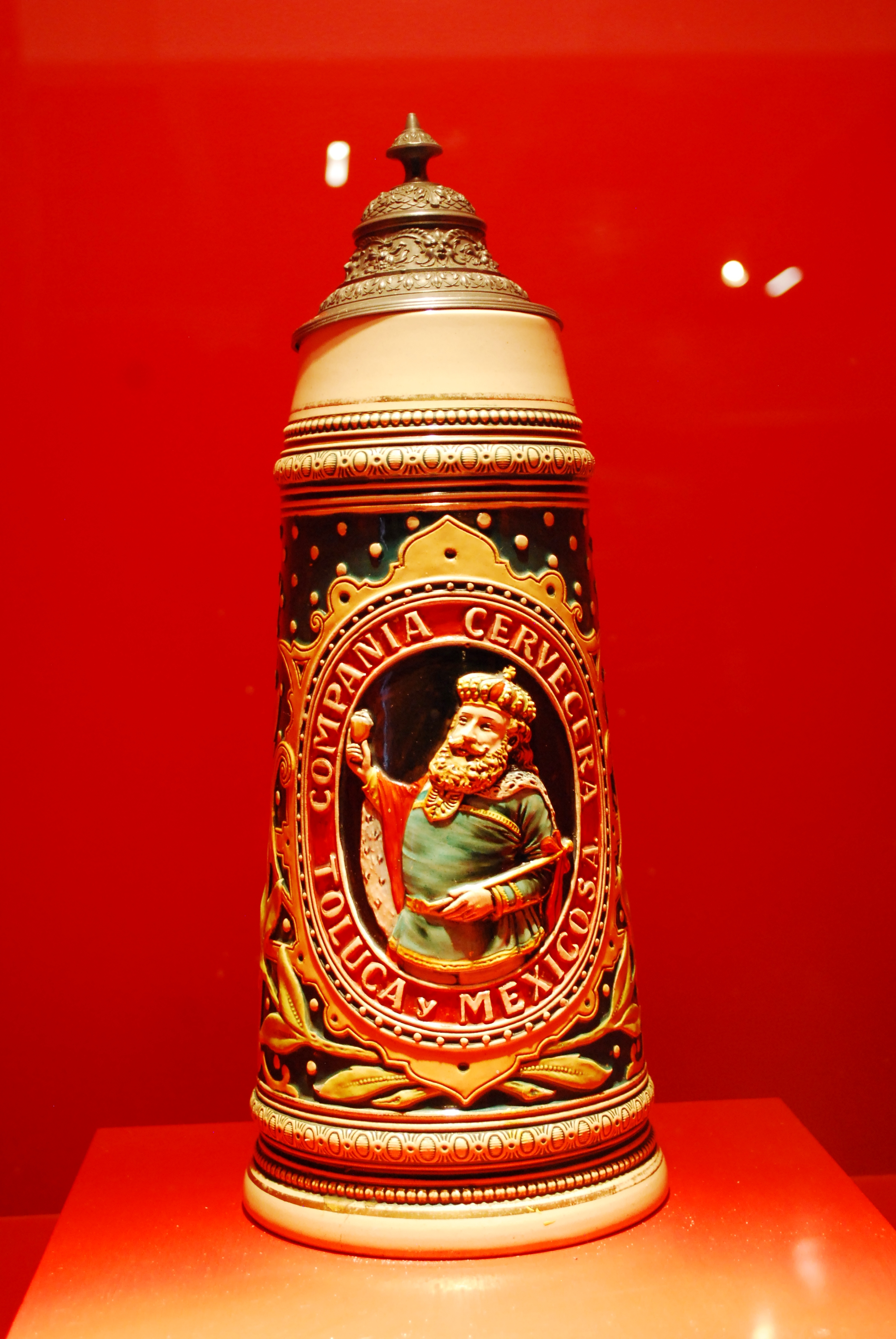
Beer stein at the Modelo Museum of Science and Industry in Toluca, Mexico

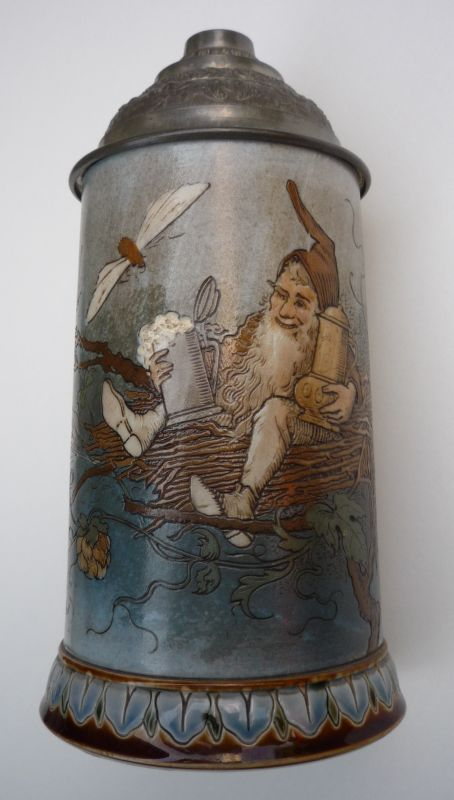
Stoneware design by Heinrich Schlitt, produced by Villeroy & Boch

== See also ==
- Tankard
- Maß
- Oktoberfest
