= Maß =

Amount of beer in a regulation mug

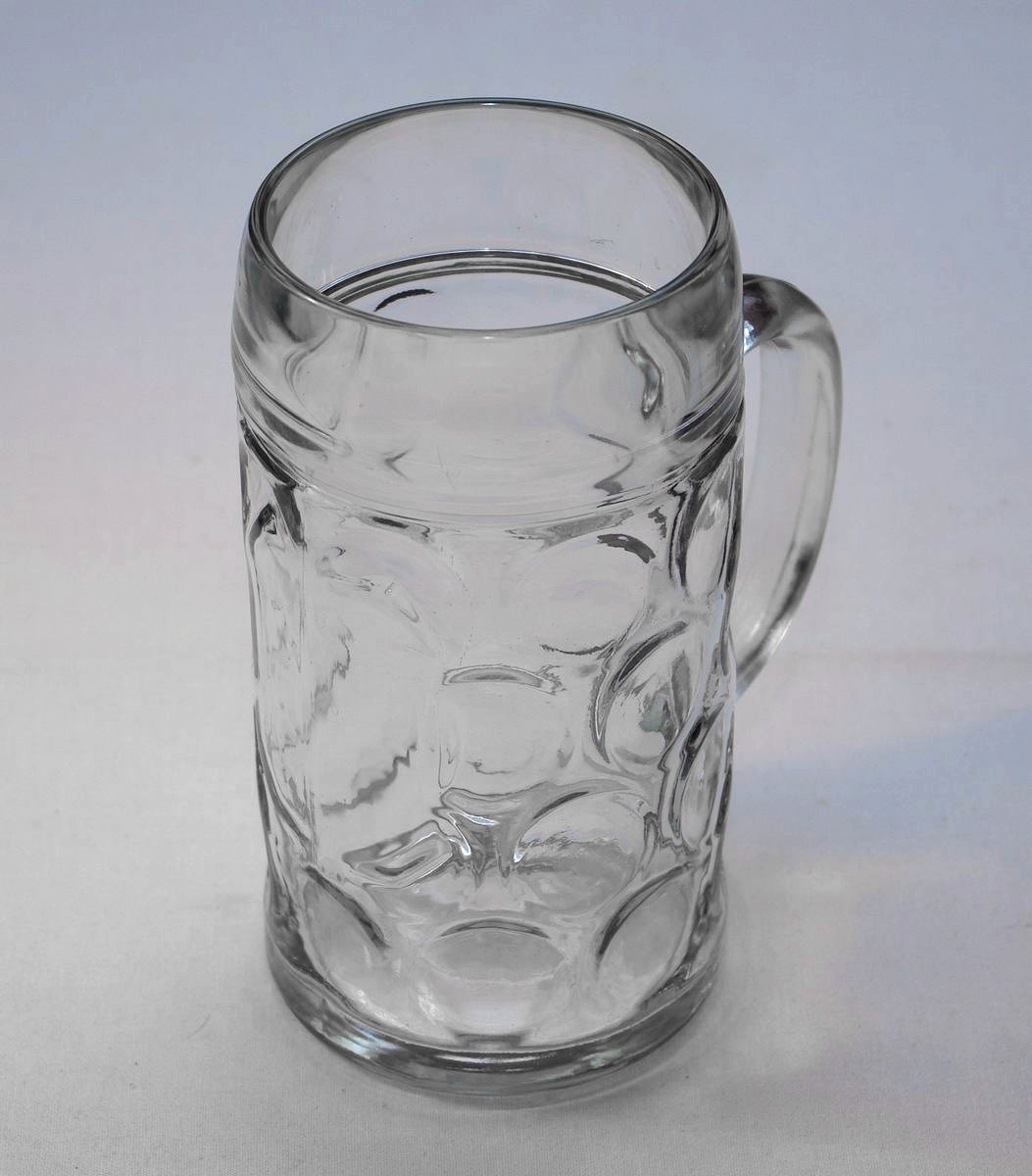
An empty Maßkrug

Maß (pronounced [ˈmaːs]) or Mass (Swiss and Bavarian spelling, elsewhere used for dialectal [ˈmas]) is the German word describing the amount of beer in a regulation mug, in modern times exactly 1 liter (33.8 U.S. fl oz; 1.8 imp pt). Maß is also a common abbreviation for Maßkrug, the handled drinking vessel containing it, ubiquitous in Bavarian beer gardens and beer halls, and a staple of Oktoberfest. This vessel is often referred to as a beer mug by English speakers, and can be correctly called a beer stein only if it is made of stoneware and capable of holding a regulation Maß of beer.

== Linguistics ==
The word "Maß" can be of either neuter or female grammatical gender. In its neuter form, das Maß, it is the German word for "measure". Its feminine version, "die Maß", is used in southern Germany and Austria to refer to a one-liter glass beer mug or its contents. It is spelled "Maß" or "Mass" (both spellings are permissible) in Germany and Austria, and "Mass" in Switzerland. The plural is also Maß.

A stoneware mug is a form of beer stein, another type of vessel which may only be referred to as a Maßkrug if capable of holding a regulation quantity of beer.

== Measurement ==
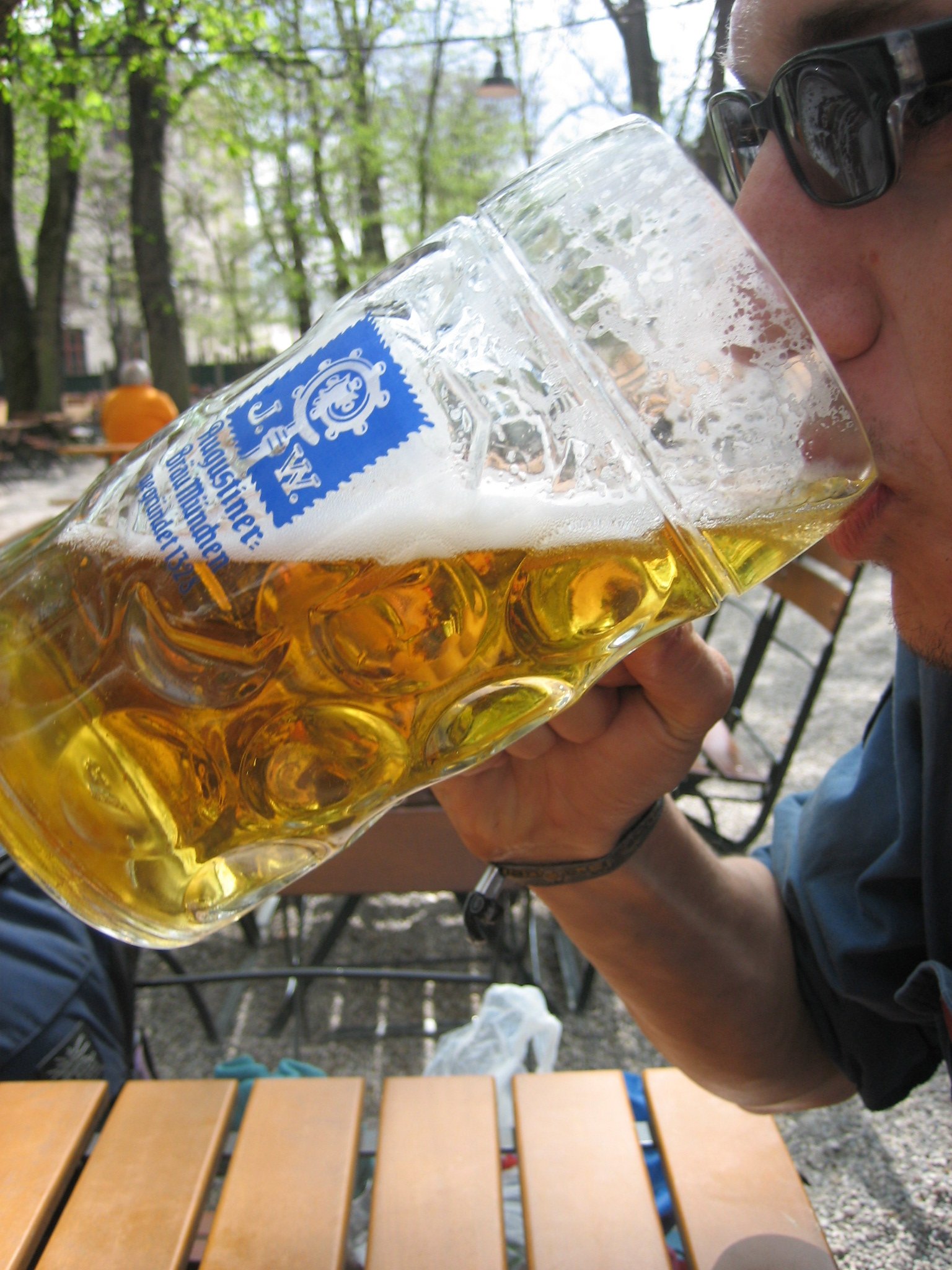
German Maßkrug of Augustiner Bräu

In the Southern German areas (Austro-Bavarian), the Maß originally measured 1.069 liters (2.26 U.S. pt; 1.881 imp pt). Other German-speaking areas had different measures; in Switzerland between 1838 and 1877, and in Baden until 1871, the Maß was 1.5 liters.

The modern Maßkrug is slightly larger than 1 liter, with a fill line denoting the level to which the beer must be filled; the area above the line denotes space for the head to expand. Selling beer in mugs with a fraudulent or missing calibration mark is also prosecuted as fraud. An "Association Against Fraudulent Pouring [of Beer]" ("Verein gegen betrügerisches Einschenken") in Munich fights for the customer rights of beer drinkers, and is mostly active on Oktoberfest.

In the more northerly parts of Germany, the Maß has mostly fallen out of use, except for Bavarian-themed events, since beer for immediate consumption there is usually sold in smaller amounts, from 0.2–0.5 liters (6.8–17 U.S. fl oz),

== Other ==
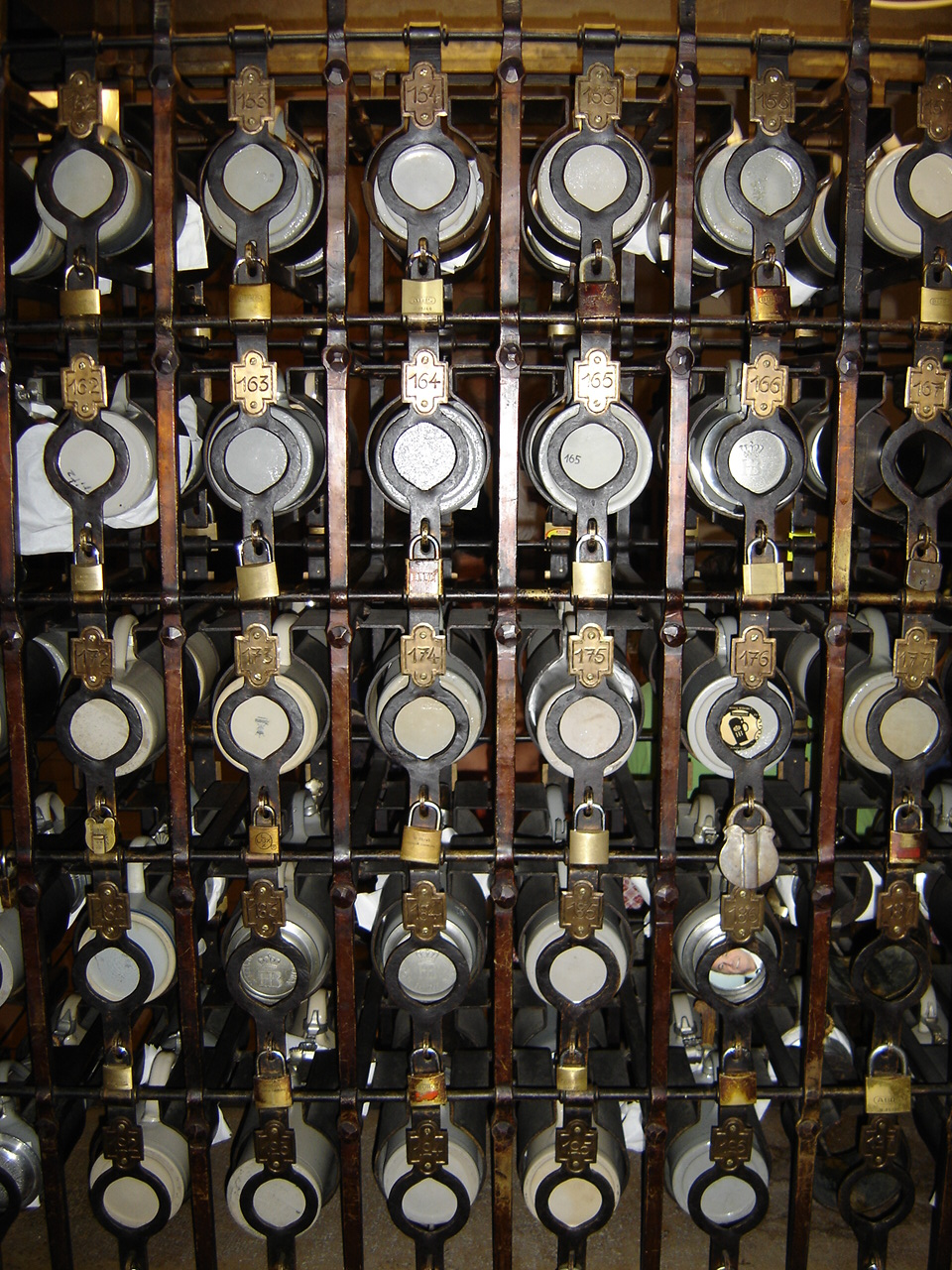
Patron's mugs stored under lock and key at the Hofbräuhaus am Platzl in Munich

Mugs are frequently decorated with a print of the logo of the brewery.

Some beer gardens and restaurants rent space out to patrons to store their mugs, which often have personalized engravings on their lids. For a small monthly fee, the establishment will also wash one's mug.

According to physicist Erich Schuller of the Institute for Forensic Medicine at the Ludwig-Maximilians-Universität München (LMU Munich), a Maßkrug is an "effective percussion tool" in which each strike is potentially life-threatening. An empty Maß weighs 1.3 kilograms (2.9 lb) and can produce a force of 8,500 newtons (1,900 lb_{f}) in a violent blow, far surpassing the 4,000 newtons (900 lb_{f}) required to break a human's skullcap. Some cases have occurred, though, in which the Maßkrug yielded. Presumably, these mugs had reduced strength due to wear.

== Maßkrugstemmen/Masskrugstemmen/steinholding ==
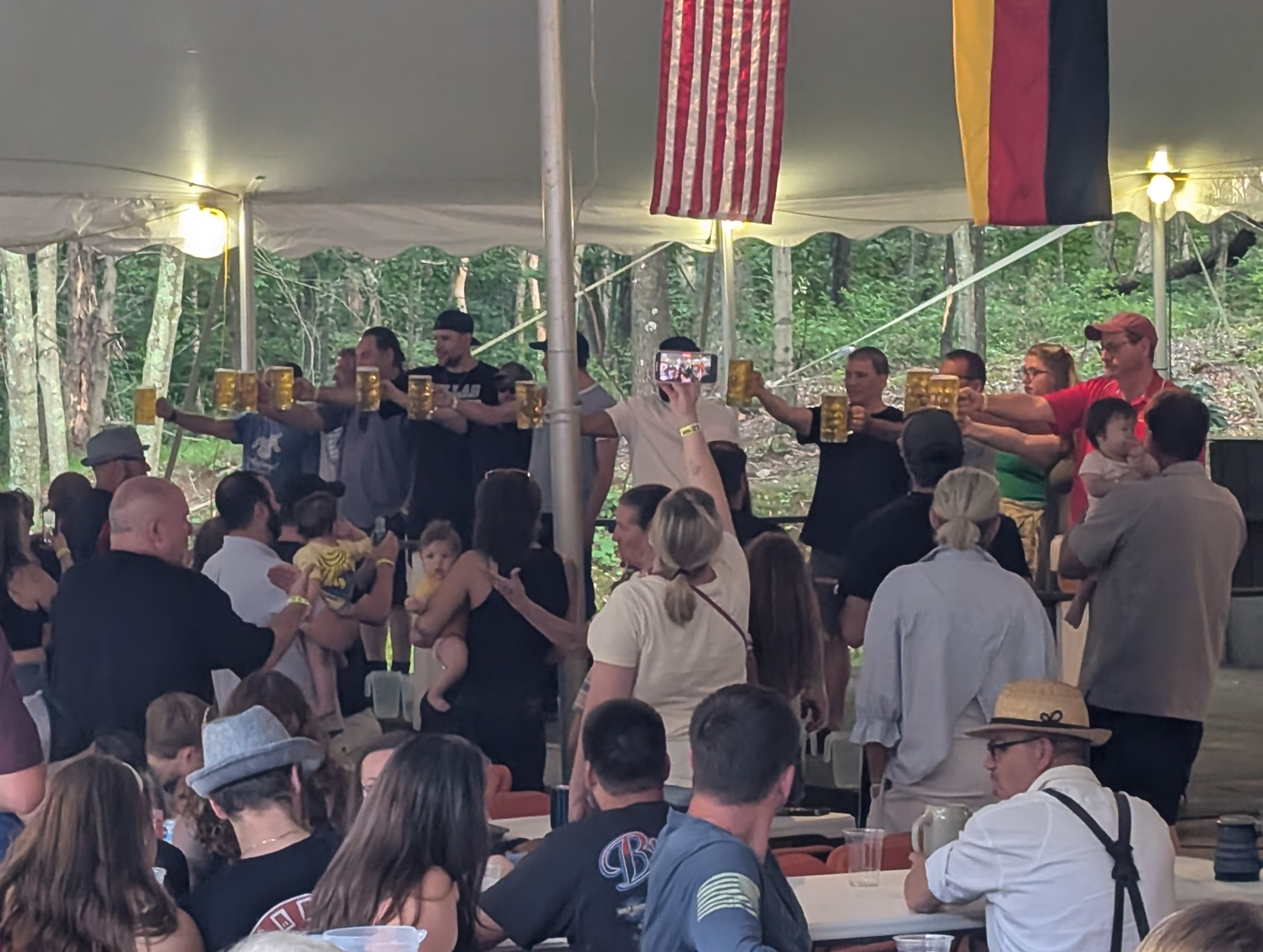
A Maßkrugstemmen event

The endurance sport of Maßkrugstemmen involves holding a filled 2.4-kilogram (5.3 lb) Maß at arm's length. The world record is 45 minutes and 2 seconds. While the sport is believed to have originated in Bavaria, Germany, competitions are now seen worldwide. A governing body has been created in the United States as the U.S. Steinholding Association.

== See also ==
- Maashaus
- Beer glassware
- Tankard
