= Maashaus =

Large room in town house

Maashaus (German: Maßhaus) is a spacious room taking the whole front part of a ground floor of a multi-storied Gothic or Renaissance town house.

This room was used mainly for serving beer, or other kinds of trade and craft. It was not heated. It also worked to link together other parts of the house, since it held a staircase to the first floor above ground (where the owner lived) and to the basement, an archway or similar passage to the courtyard and so on. The ceiling was almost always vaulted and was often supported by an asymmetrically placed central column. It was separated from the street or the arcade by a wall with a doorway and one or more windows.

== Origins ==
Maashauses started to appear in the 13th century as a manifestation of the trend to sequester the living quarters of a burghers' house to the first floor. What used to be a main living room of the house, the so-called smoke abode, kept only its public, trade and craft functions, which remained on the ground floor, because they required the proximity of the cellar, the courtyard and especially the street entrance. The trade activities involved mainly the aforementioned serving of beer, which is related to the brewing rights (in the Middle Ages a vast majority of burghers' houses were granted this right), but other trade and crafts were performed there also.

== Maashauses in Bohemia ==
In the 19th century most maashauses were converted to private shops. Later, they were being renovated in many historic cities as part of restoration activities in the socialist period. To this day, maashauses are found in many buildings in the centers of Česky Krumlov, Slavonice and so on. After 1989 many maashauses were again employed for retail or by pubs and restaurants.

== Etymology ==
"Maß“ is an old unit of volume (approximately equivalent to 1.4 L), used for measuring mainly beer, haus means a "house“ in German, but in the past it could also stand for the main living room of a house. Therefore, maashaus could be translated as a "beer house".
