= Robert Guttmann =

20th-century Czech painter

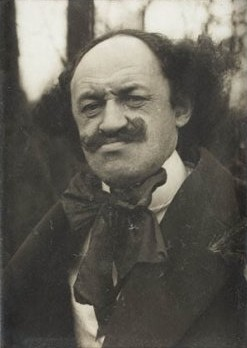
- Born: 20 April 1880; Sušice, Czech Republic
- Died: 14 March 1942 (aged 61); Łódź, Poland
- Known for: Painting, Zionism

Robert Guttmann (born 20 April 1880 in Sušice, Southern Bohemia; died 14 March 1942 in the Łódź Ghetto), was a Czech painter and Zionist.

== Life ==
Robert Guttmann attended primary school in Planá nad Lužnicí and secondary school in České Budějovice, leaving after two years. In 1895 his family moved to Prague, where he attended the two-year Bergmann private business school and then the private art school of the landscape painter Alois Kirnig. From 1893, Guttmann was involved in a Jewish youth organisation, and in 1897 he set off for the first Zionist congress in Basel. He hiked to Basel on foot, financing the trip by selling hand-painted postcard views and caricatures. This was to remain his main source of income in later years. In 1899 he was a co-founder of a Zionist organisation in Prague. He attended most of the Zionist congresses until 1925, where his eccentric appearance set him apart from other delegates.

Guttmann was a Prague café and street painter. His striking appearance and extensive travels helped to make him famous in his day. “The Professor”, as he was known, sold his art for pocket change. He was widely photographed and caricatured in Czechoslovakia.

He wandered through Slovakia and Carpathian Ukraine visiting Jewish communities in those areas.

With the German occupation of Czechoslovakia in early 1939, the life Guttmann had been used to living in suddenly vanished. Now allowed only to go to the "Jewish" Café Roxy, he spent most of his time in his small room with his pictures and newspaper clippings. A photograph survives of Guttmann striding along a street in Prague's Old Town in 1941, still dressed in customary bohemian style but wearing a Star of David.

On 16 October 1941 Guttmann was deported on the first transport that left Prague for the Lodz ghetto. Life in the harsh confines of the ghetto seems to have been unendurable for the free-spirited artist who had roamed eastern Europe on foot. He became apathetic and silent, staring vacantly into space, still clutching the folder he used to carry around Prague. He died on 12 March 1942.

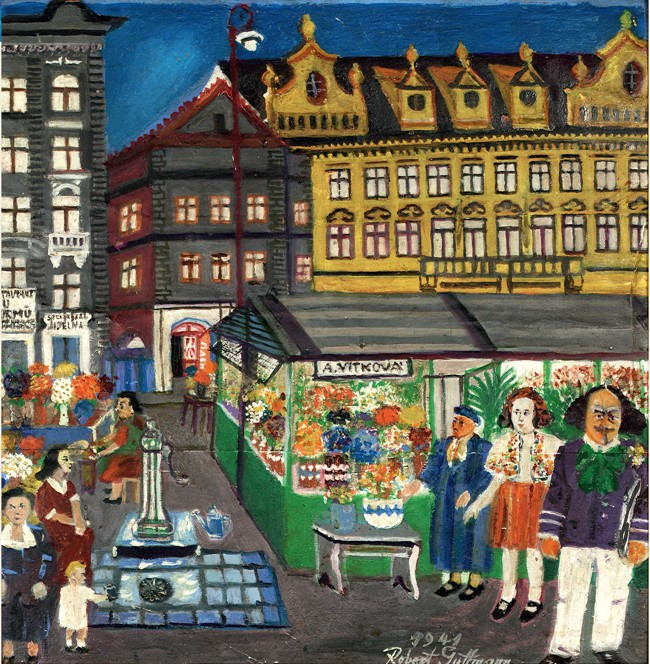
Coal market in Prague with Self-Portrait (1941)

As an artist, he defended his right to freedom of self-expression: "I am completely independent and happy that I have escaped the pedantry of the academic world and that I am free to live and rage!". During his lifetime, he was known more as a Prague character than as an artist. It was only after World War 2 that his works came to be admired as the creations of an original naive artist. Some of his surviving works from 1939 to 1941 appear in the collection of the Jewish Museum in Prague, one of whose branches opened in 2001 as the Robert Guttmann Gallery with an exhibition of his pictures.

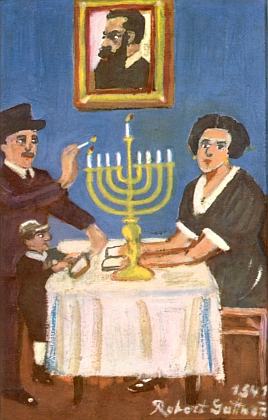
Chanukka mit Theodor Herzl (1941)
