= Master IW =

Bohemian or Saxon Renaissance painter (fl. 1520–1550)

Master IW, also Monogramist I.W., was a Czech or Saxon Renaissance painter, trained in the workshop of Lucas Cranach the Elder, active between 1520 and 1550 mainly in north-west Bohemia.

== Life ==
According to German art historians, there is no doubt that Master IW was a pupil of Lucas Cranach the Elder and worked in his workshop in Wittenberg before moving to Bohemia. Although he had significant clients here, no written documents have survived that would allow the IW signature to be identified with a specific name. The registers of the Prague painters' fraternity from 1521-1531 repeatedly state that a painter named Jan Wrtilka, who lived and had his own workshop in Louny, was the "guest master" of the Prague guild. However, only records of Wrtilka's artisan painting commissions from 1518-1519 have been preserved, and the neutral designation Master IW persisted in the literature. M. Hamsíková has dealt in detail with the work of Master IW.

Master I.W. worked mainly for Catholic clients (Osek Monastery, Deacon's Church in Most, St. Vitus Cathedral) and aristocratic families - e.g. the Saxon Fictum family, domesticated in Bohemia, with estates in the vicinity of Vintířov. Opl of Fictum (Appel von Vitzthum) was a royal sub-chamberlain and diplomat of Louis II of Hungary. After 1538, Master IW probably had his own workshop with an assistant and supplied Marian devotional paintings also for bourgeois families. The paintings The Murder of St. Wenceslas (1543) or The Copper Serpent are considered workshop works.

== Work ==
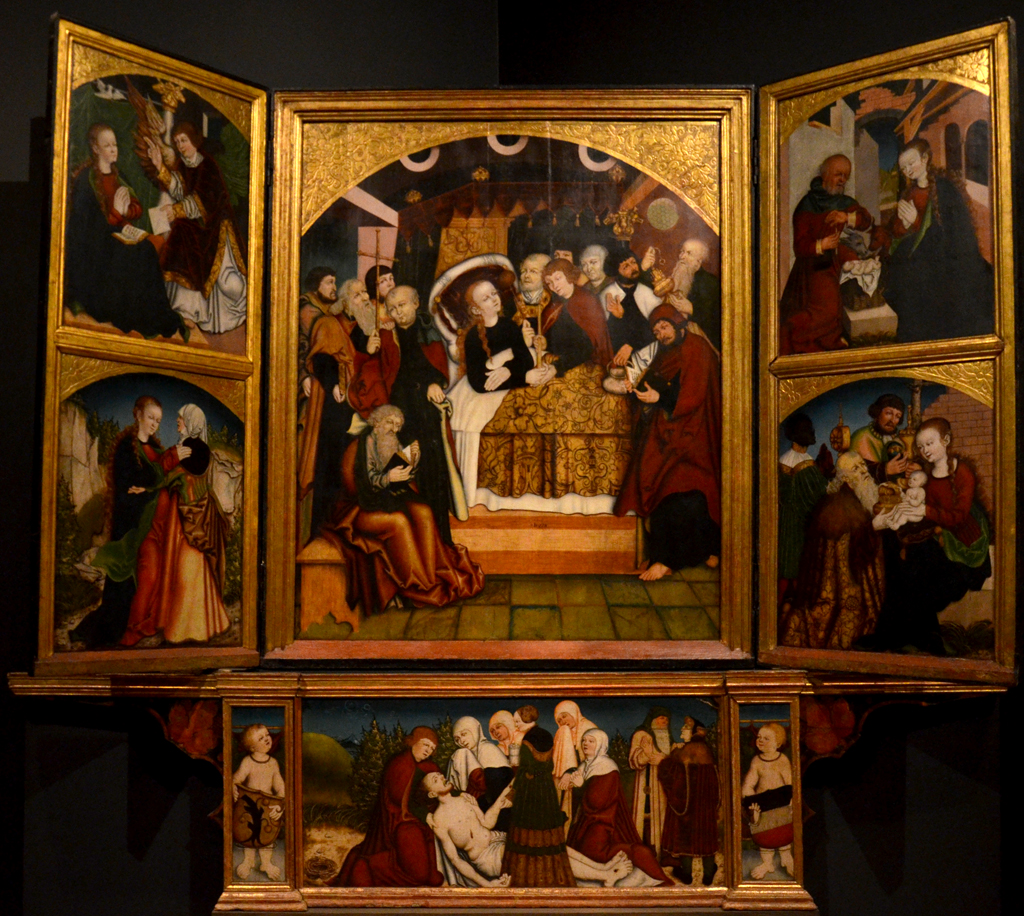
Master IW, Altar from Želina

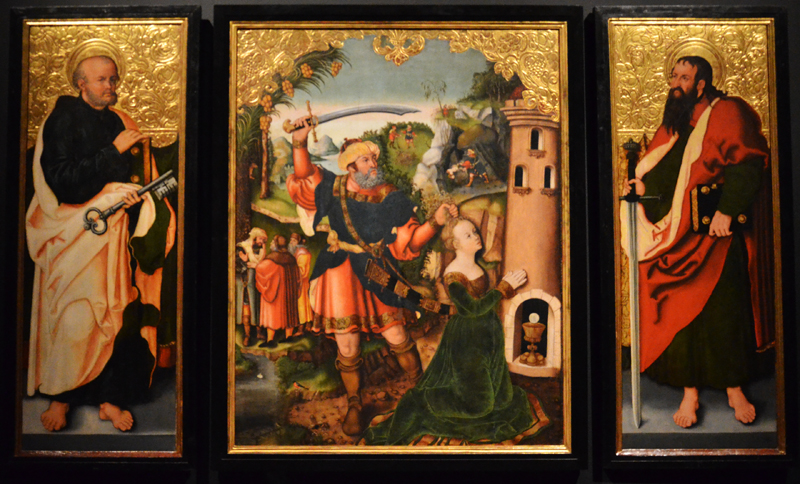
Master IW, Altar with the beheading of St. Barbara (1545)

Master IW was inspired by Cranach's graphic models, and some of the faces of his saints have similar features to Cranach's portraits. His early works were characterized by a certain fragility of figures and sharper folds of drapery. The gilded backgrounds on the panels of the Litoměřice Altar show an uncertainty in the treatment of space. The later style of Master IW's painting is characterised by decorative details (friezes, column heads, distinctive gilded edges of the chasubles, etc.) and perfection of the painter's execution, the flowing nature of his handwriting and the subtlety of the transitions of light and shadow.

The first signed and dated work is The Suicide of Lucretia (1525). Very similar in execution to this are the paintings Salome with the Head of John the Baptist and Judith with the Head of Holofernes (identified as a work by Master IW only in 1996.) Both subjects were reworked repeatedly by Lucas Cranach the Elder and his workshop. The Cranach Digital Archive records 46 versions of Lucrezia, 8 x Salomé, 21 versions of Judith

The largest complete, signed and dated work by Master IW is the Želina Altar (1526). Compositionally, it is very close to the surviving design drawings by Lucas Cranach the Elder for the retables intended to decorate the church of St. Mary Magdalene and St. Lawrence in Halle (which IW himself may have been involved in while still working in Cranach's workshop) and also the retable with the Death of the Virgin by another of Cranach's pupils – the so-called Meister des Pflockschen Altars (1522). The latter was made for the funeral chapel of the Pflock family in the church of St. Anne in Annaberg-Buchholz, Saxony. The Želina Altar, commissioned by Opel of Fictum, was probably originally intended for the Franciscan Church of the Fourteen Holy Helpers in Kadaň, which supported the Fictum family in difficult times and where their tombstones are located. The dating of the altar may be related to the upcoming campaign against the Turks in 1526, when the possibility of sudden death without the last rites became real. This corresponds to the central scene with the Death of the Virgin Mary, which often appeared on epitaphs in funerary chapels in connection with the so-called good death (see St George's Altar). The Virgin Mary thus embodies the soul of a righteous, redeemed human being, lying on bed and receiving the last rites, as well as intercessor at the Last Judgement. The Marian scenes on the wings of the altar are based on prints by A. Dürer and L. Cranach and depict the scenes: Annunciation to the Virgin Mary, Visitation of the Virgin Mary, Nativity of Christ, Adoration of the Three Kings. On the predella there is a scene of The Lamentation of Christ and putti with the coats of arms of Opel of Victum and his wife Dorota, née Trčková of Lípa. On the fixed wings of the altar and on the back of the movable wings are depicted the patron saints of the country (from left), Adalbert of Prague, St. Wenceslas, St. Sigismund and St. Vitus.

The masterpiece of Master IW is the double-sided painted Votive painting from Šopka (Pšovka) with the Sorrowful Christ, Death and Donor on one side and the Holy Trinity (Throne of Grace) on the other. Christ is presented as the one who made the sacrifice for the purification of mankind from sin and shows his wounds to urge the punishment of the sinners for whom it was made in vain. The Throne of Grace depicts God who sacrificed his son for the salvation of mankind (the adoration of Holy Trinity is also the subject of a slightly earlier painting by the Master of the Litoměřice Altarpiece). The figure of Christ is based on a model by Albrecht Dürer (1500), but is characterized by extraordinary inventiveness in composition, delicacy of execution, soft glazes and careful execution of details. In terms of its painterly quality, the painting is comparable, for example, to Cranach's Prague Altarpiece. The identity of the donor of the painting is not clear. In 1502, Ladislaus Jagiello granted the right of submission to St. Lawrence Church in Pšovka and the right to choose the monastery as the ancestral burial place to Albrecht von Kolowrat and Libštejn. However, at the time of the painting's creation, the right of patronage was already held by Radslav Beřkovský von Šebířov and Liběchov (†1537), a knight and in 1512-1523 and 1525-1537 the highest scribe and royal secretary. Jaroslav Hasištejnský of Lobkovice (brother of Jan and Bohuslav), who resided in nearby Obříství and died in 1529, could also have been a donor.

Two votive paintings with Madonnas, dated 1538, were commissioned by wealthy burghers. The Votive plaque of Kašpar Kašpárek with the little Jesus holding a grape with his left hand and a ball of wine in his right hand above the donor's head refers to the eucharist. The Bridge Plate with the figure of Assumpta on the crescent and the kneeling donors in medallions mostly repeats scenes from the Želina Altar (Annunciation, Visitation of the Virgin Mary, Birth of Jesus and Death of the Virgin Mary). The medallion on the top right (Christ Appearing to the Virgin Mary) is based on the woodcut by A. Dürer. The arrangement of scenes in medallions was popular in Germany and was related to the founding of the Rosary Brotherhoods.

The last signed work by Master IW, also known from two later copies in Duchcov and Chomutov, is the Pensive Christ (1541, now Staatliche Kunstsammlungen Dresden). On altars from a later period there may have been a signature on some parts that have not survived, e.g. on the predella. The attribution of other works to Master IW is supported by a comparative analysis of style and painting technique and by restoration reports. The Murder of St. Wenceslas of 1543 is based on the composition of the mural by the Master of the Litoměřice Altarpiece in St. Wenceslas Chapel in St. Vitus Cathedral and the woodcut by Lucas Cranach. The painting may have been commissioned while the cathedral was being repaired after the Great Fire of 1541, in connection with the expected visit of Ferdinand I to Prague (1543). This is evidenced by the two coats of arms with the Bohemian lion and the imperial eagle above the portal.

The St. Catherine's Centenary is probably the central part of the dismantled and lost altar. It is characterised by a new conception of space with a steep hill in the background, lively gestures of the figures and a composition that enhances the sweeping gesture of the executioner. The painting is considered one of the finest works of Master I.W.

The Altar with the Beheading of St. Barbara from Osek is based on the same composition of the central figures as the previous Beheading of St. Catherine and in the background depicts in four spatial plans other scenes from the legend of Saint Barbara. In the lower left corner there are several small depictions with hidden meanings that refer to theological texts. On the movable wings are St. Peter on the left and St. Paul on the right. The closed wings depict the protectors against plagues and epidemics – St. Roch with St. Sebastian were a common theme in their time. The commissioner (according to the coat of arms on the wing with St. Sebastian) was the governor of Osek, Richard Kozelka of Hřivice, who was elevated to the nobility in 1546. The painting attributed to the workshop of Master I.W. around 1550 - The Elevation of the Copper Serpent – also comes from the Osek monastery. The unusual subject is taken from Cranach's allegorical painting Law and Grace (1529), where it is part of the background scene.

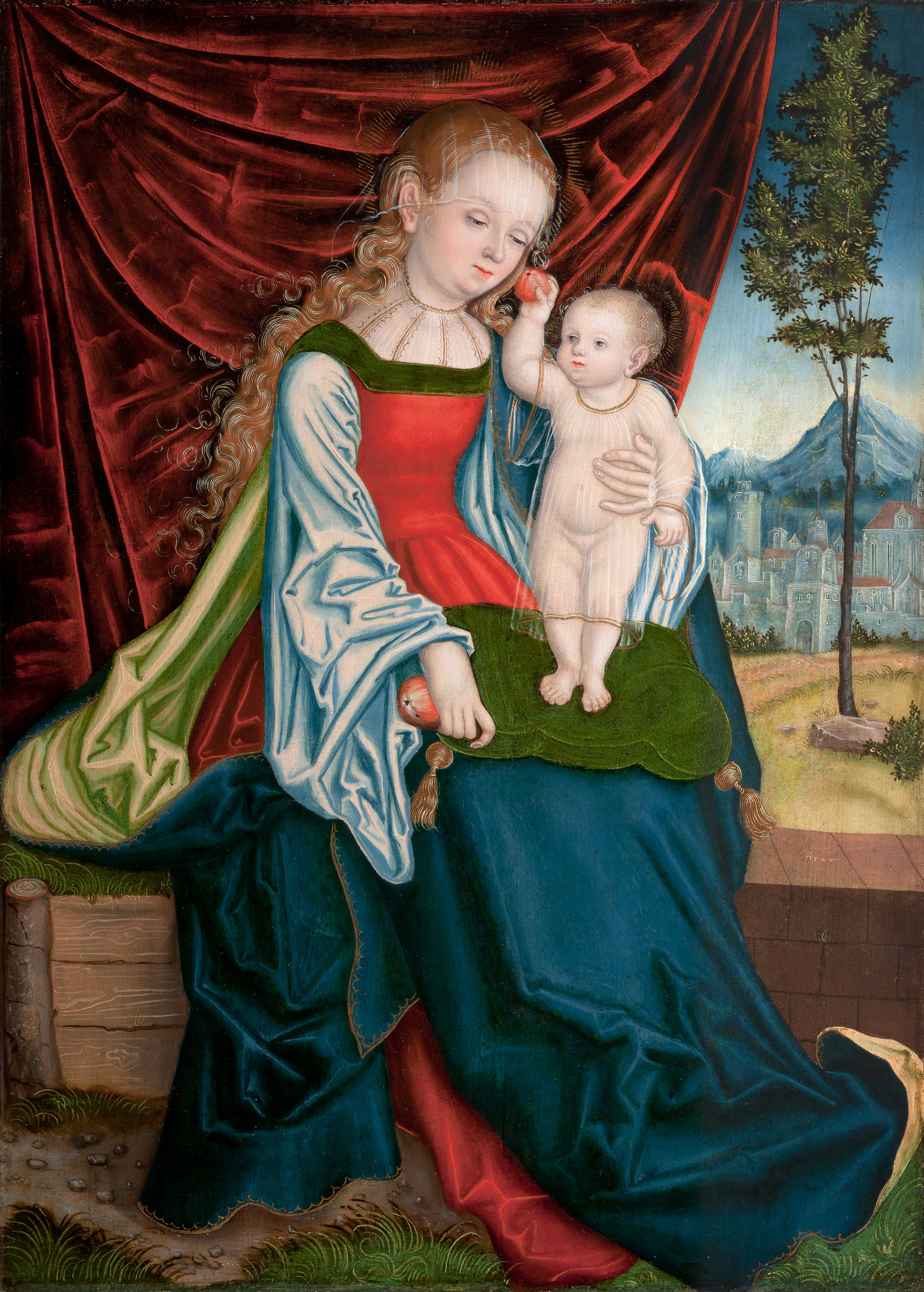
Master IW, Madonna and Child (1525)

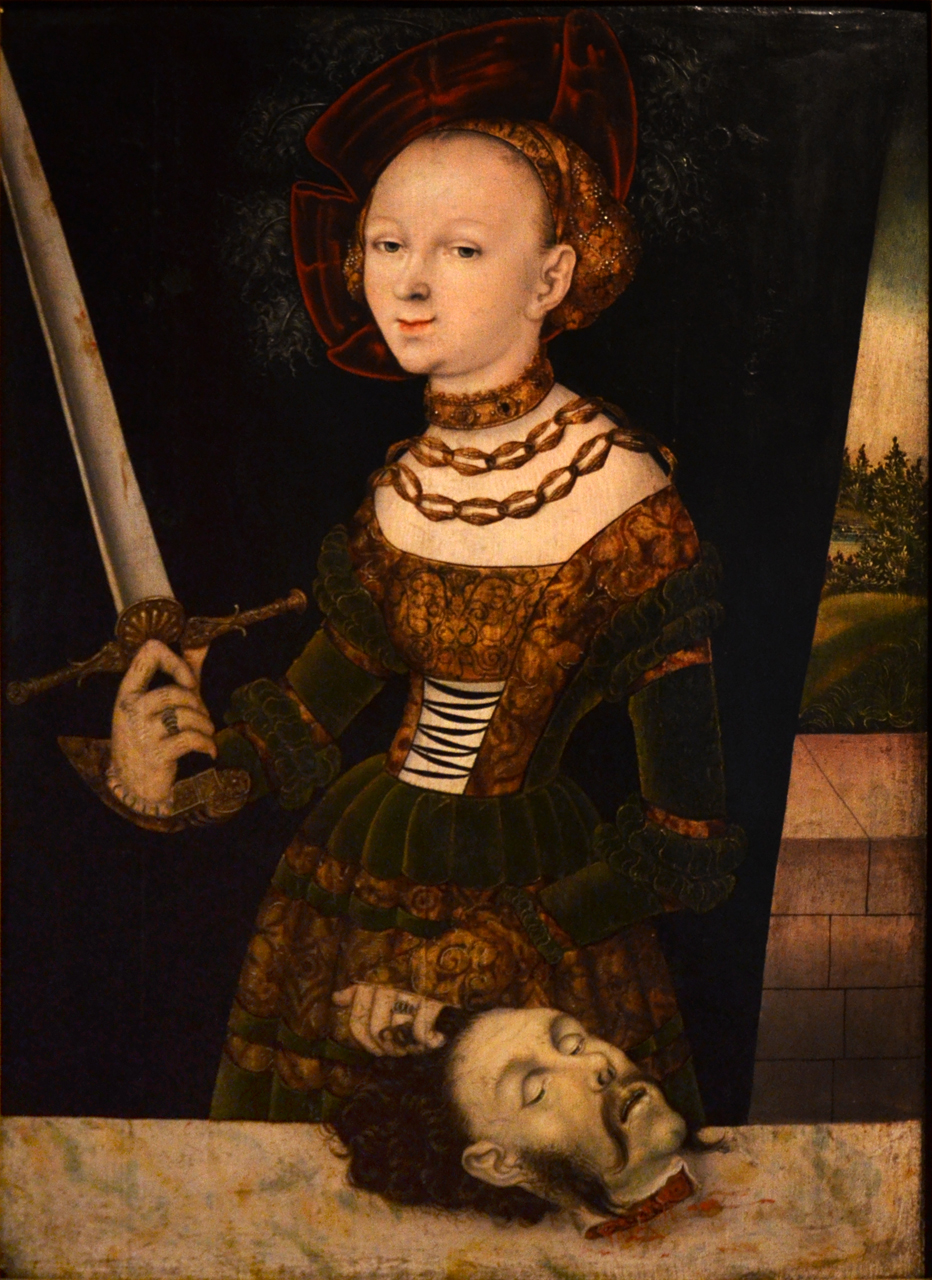
Master IW, Judith with the head of Holofernes (1525)

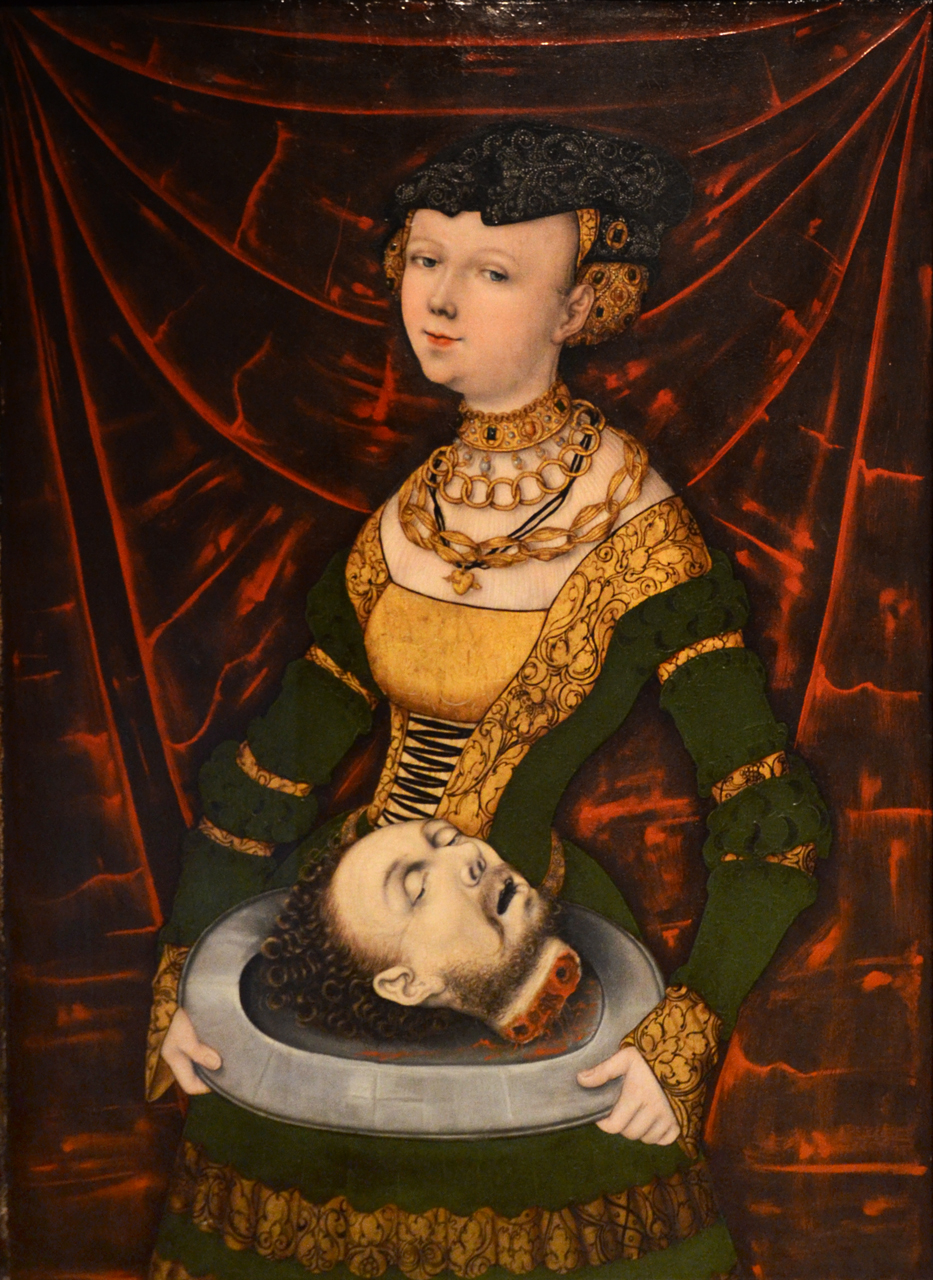
Master IW, Salomé with the head of St. John the Baptist (1525)

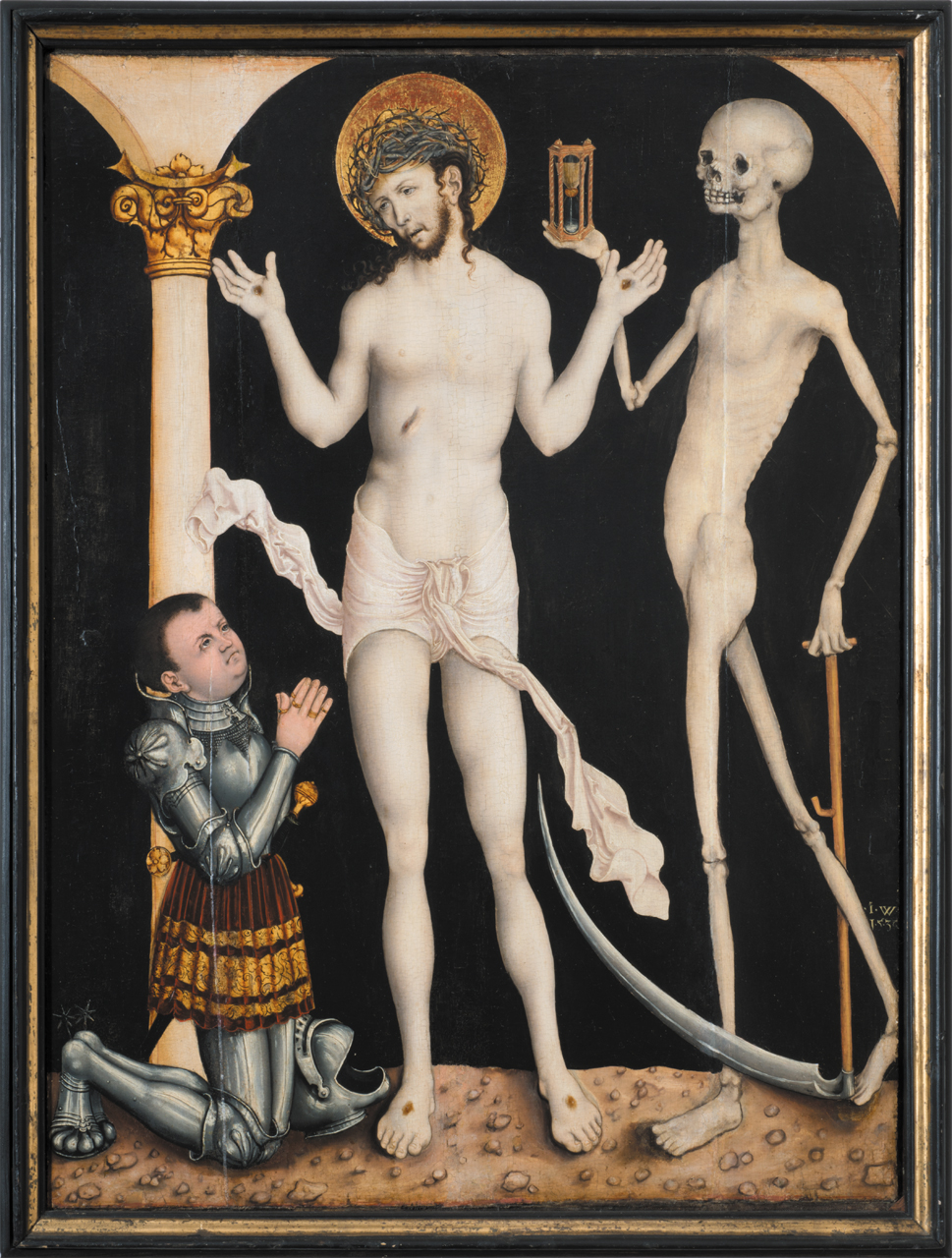
Master IW, Votive painting from Šopka (1530), avers

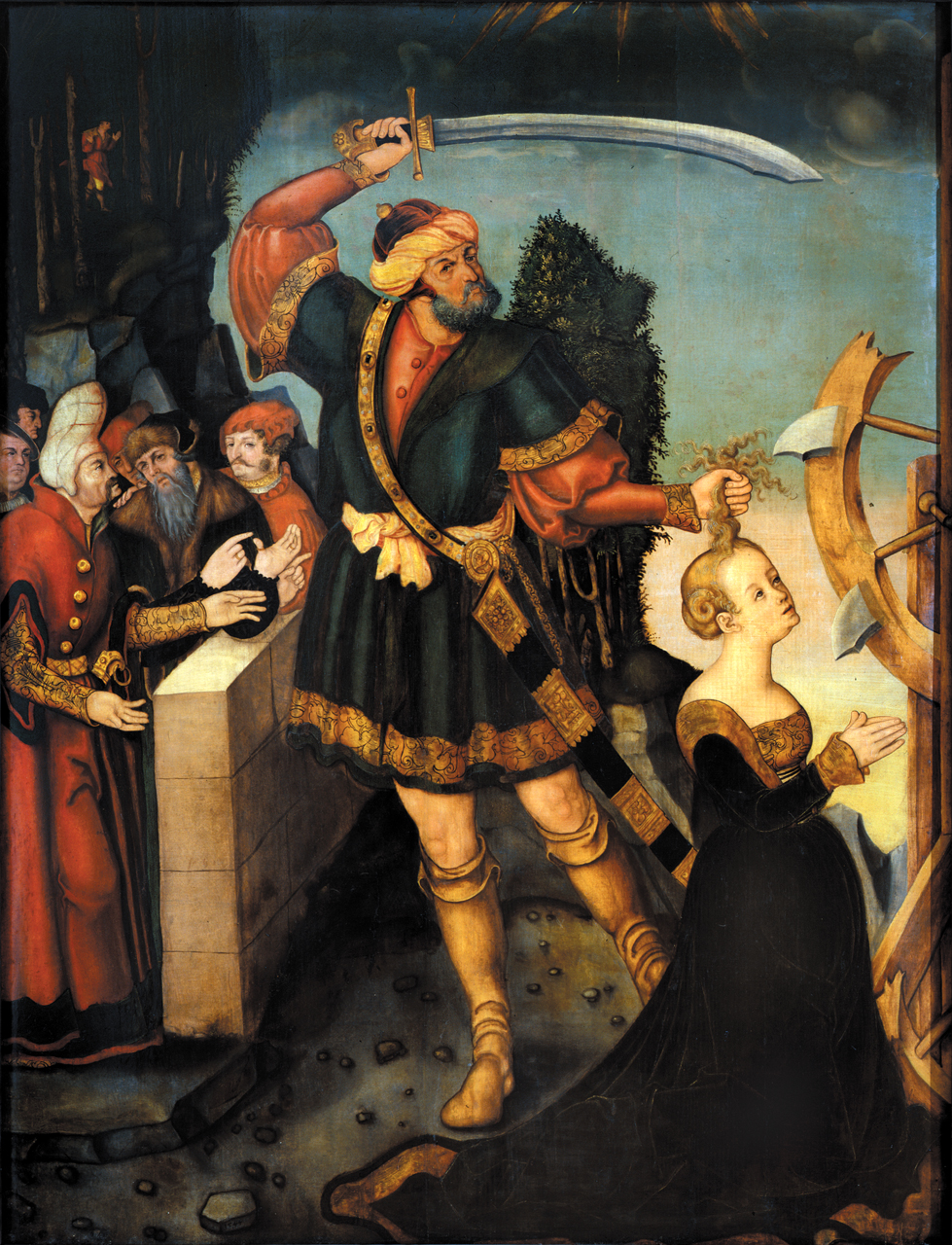
Master IW, Beheading of St. Catherine (1520-1540)

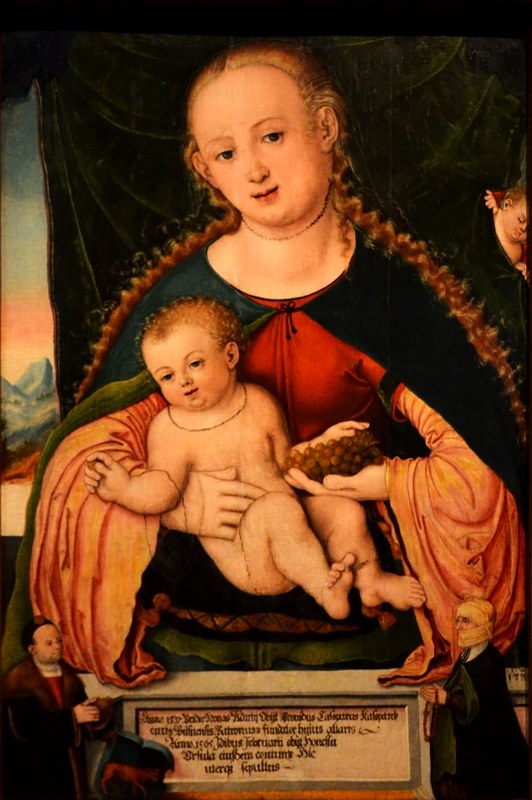
Master IW, Epitaph of Kašpar Kašpárek and his wife (1538)

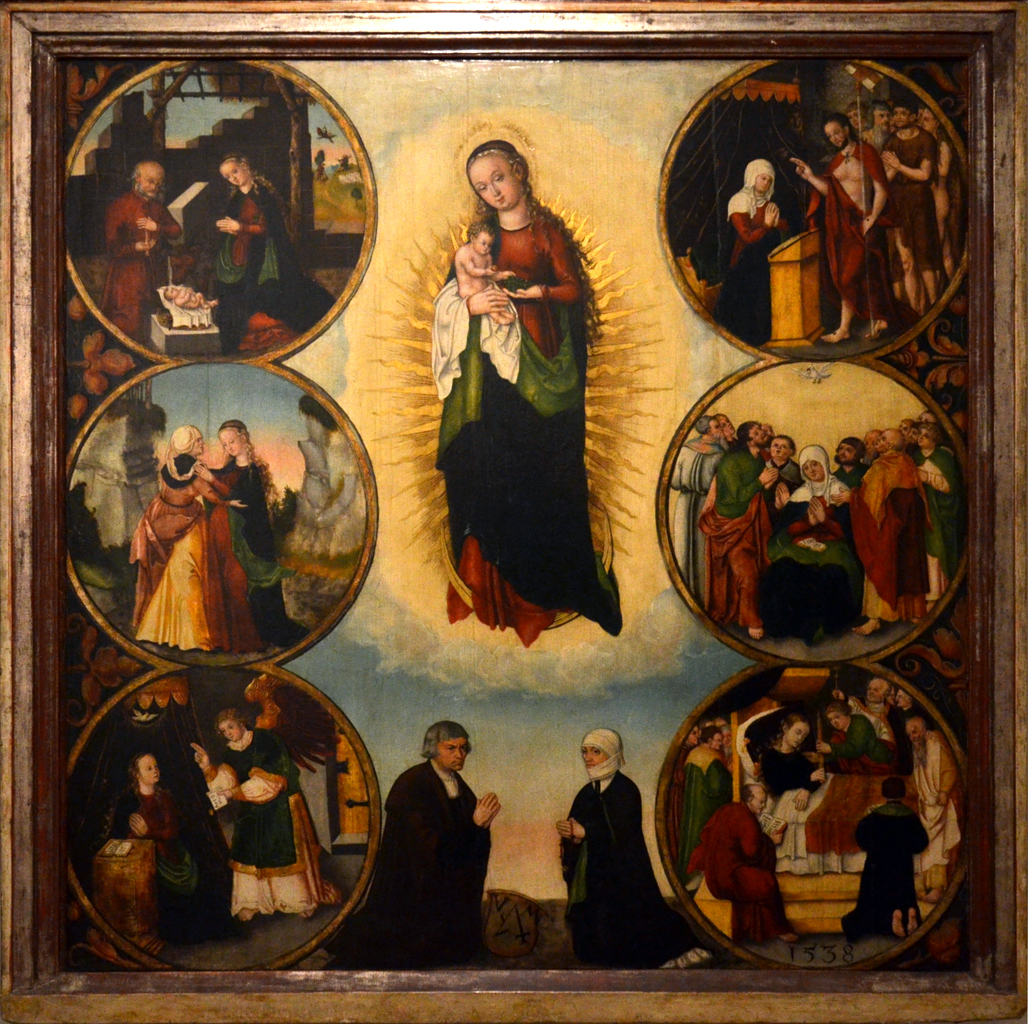
Master IW, Votive panel with Assumpta, so-called Mostecká (1538)

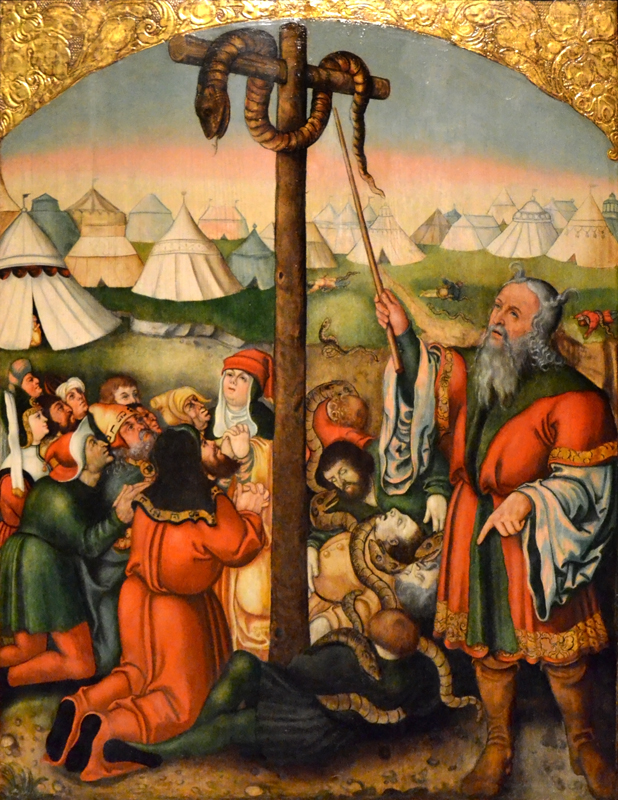
Master IW (workshop), Elevation of the bronze snake (1550)

== List of works ==
- after 1520 Litoměřice Altar: St. Wenceslas (upper part of the left wing), St. Catherine and St. Barbara on the back, St. Sigismund (right wing), St. Voršil and St. Agnes on the back at the top, St. Apolena and St. Kristina at the bottom. The central part of the altar is missing. North Bohemian Gallery of Fine Arts in Litoměřice
- 1525 The Suicide of Lucretia, Heinz Kisters Collection, Kreuzlingen, Switzerland
- 1525 Judith with the Head of Holofernes, Strahov Monastery
- 1525 Salome with the Head of John the Baptist, private collection
- 1525 Madonna and Child, National Gallery in Prague
- 1526 Marian Altar from Želina, Regional Museum Chomutov
- 1530 Votive image from Šopka, North Bohemian Gallery of Fine Arts in Litoměřice, originally St. Lawrence Church in Mělník, Pšovka district
- 1530 Madonna among the Saints, Gallery of Strahov Monastery
- 1537 Predela with Veraikon, last seen in 1917 in an art shop, since then missing, documented only by a black and white photograph
- 1538 Votive Plaque of Most, Church of the Assumption of the Virgin Mary in Most
- 1538 Votive plaque of Kašpar Kašpárek, originally for the Franciscan monastery church in Plzeň, now National Gallery in Prague
- 1541 Pensive Christ, originally from the Osek Monastery, now Gemäldegalerie Alte Meister, Dresden, copy from 1585 in the District Museum in Chomutov, another copy from Duchcov was destroyed at the end of the war.
- 1543 Murder of St. Wenceslas, Chapel of St. Wenceslas in St. Vitus Cathedral, Metropolitan Chapter of St. Vitus in Prague
- 1544 Beheading of St. Catherine, originally All Saints Church in Litoměřice, now North Bohemian Gallery of Fine Arts in Litoměřice
- after 1546: St. Barbara Altarpiece from Osek, National Gallery in Prague
- before 1550, workshop: Worship of the Copper Serpent, Church of the Assumption of the Virgin Mary in Most

== Sources ==
- Vojtěch Novotný et al., Živá spojení (Lucas Cranach a severozápadní Čechy) / Living Connections (Lucas Cranach and Northwest Bohemia), 145 p., North Bohemian Gallery of Fine Arts in Litoměřice, Charles University, Catholic Faculty of Theology, 2019, ISBN 978-80-87784-53-2, ISBN 978-80-87922-20-0
- Martin Barus at al., Ad gloriam Dei (130 let Diecézního muzea v Litoměřicích a 20 let jeho obnovené existence) / Ad gloriam Dei (130 years of the Diocesan Museum in Litoměřice and 20 years of its renewed existence), 157 p., Litoměřice 2015, ISBN 978-80-87784-08-2
- Jan Royt, Gotické deskové malířství v severozápadních a severních Čechách / Gothic panel painting in Northwestern and Northern Bohemia, 1340-1550, 352 pp.., Karolinum Prague 2015, ISBN 9788024631745
- Hamsíková Magdalena, Recepce díla Lucase Cranacha st. v malířství první poloviny 16. století v Čechách / Reception of the work of Lucas Cranach Sr. in the painting of the first half of the 16th century in Bohemia, dissertation, Faculty of Arts, Charles University in Prague, 2011
- Ivana Kyzourová (ed.), Básník a král: Bohuslav Hasištejnský z Lobkovic v zrcadle jagellonské doby / The Poet and the King: Bohuslav Hasištejnský of Lobkowitz in the Mirror of the Jagiellonian Era, Prague Castle Administration, KANT Publishing House (Karel Kerlický), ISBN 978-80-86161-96-9 (PCA), ISBN 978-80-86970-29-5 (Kant)
- Kesner, Ladislav st., Mistr IW - votivní obraz ze Pšovky s Kristem, Smrtí a prosebníkem, Mělník – Pšovka. Sborník vydaný při příležitosti znovuvysvěcení kostela sv. Vavřince v Mělníku-Pšovce obnoveného po povodni roku 2002 / Master IW – votive painting from Pšovka with Christ, Death and the supplicant, Mělník - Pšovka. Proceedings published on the occasion of the rededication of the church of St. Lawrence in Mělník-Pšovka restored after the flood of 2002. 15 August 2004 / Špačková, Renata Mělník 2004, 92 p., il., pp. 54–61, ISBN 80-239-3338-8
- Šamšulová Eva, Několik poznámek k ikonografii deskových oltářů / Some notes on the iconography of panel altars. In: Památky, příroda, život. Vlastivědný čtvrtletník Chomutovska. Okresní muzeum v Chomutově 28, no. 2, (1996,) pp. 47–50.
- Mannlová-Raková Heide, Osecký opat Bartoloměj a jeho vztah k Mistru I. W. / Osek Abbot Bartholomew and his relationship to Master I. W. In: 800 years of Osek Monastery: jubilee proceedings. = 800 Jahre Kloster Ossegg. Festschrift / ed. Norbert Krutský Osek : Cistercian Abbey Osek - Society of Friends of the Osek Monastery, 1996 pp. 157–164.
- Kesner Ladislav, Mistr I W / Master IW, Gallery of Fine Arts Litoměřice 1993
- Otakar Votoček, Severočeská galerie výtvarného umění v Litoměřicích (Sbírka starého umění) / North Bohemian Gallery of Fine Arts in Litoměřice (Collection of Old Art), 76 p., Litoměřice 1983
- J. Homolka, L. Kesner, České umění gotické / Czech Gothic Art, National Gallery in Prague 1964, p. 69
- Umění tří dob. Katalog výstavy / Art of Three Ages. Exhibition catalogue, Litoměřice 4. VI. – 26 IX. 1948 (p. 9)
- Antonín Matějček, Nepoznaný obraz Monogramisty IW v Praze / The Unrecognized Image of the IW Monogrammist in Prague, in: Book about Prague – Prague Almanac, Prague 1931, pp. 18–23.
