= Votive painting from Šopka =

Painting by the Master IW

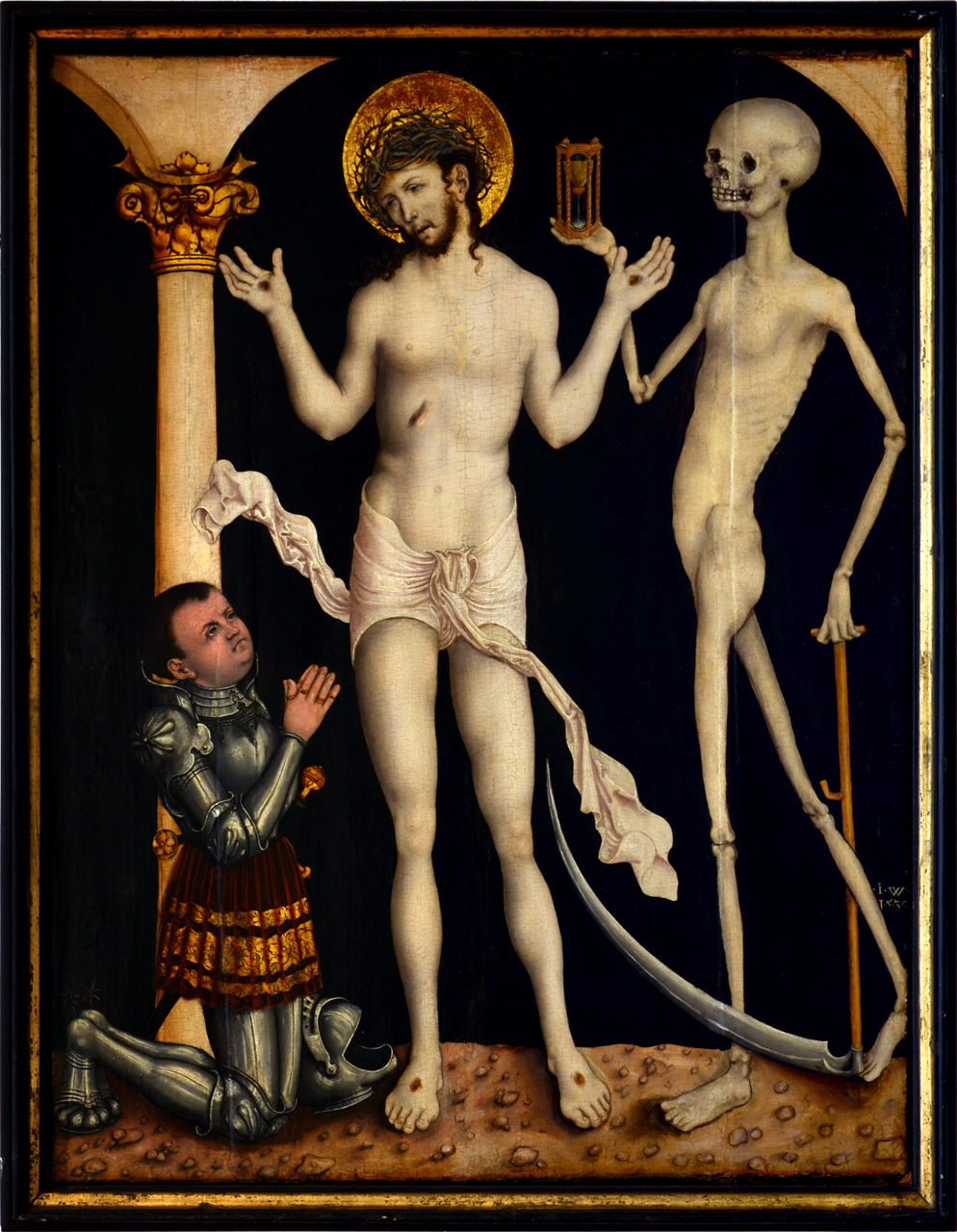
Master IW, Votive painting from Šopka (1530)

The votive painting from Šopka is the work of an anonymous disciple of Lucas Cranach the Elder, who worked in north-west Bohemia and is referred to by the initials with which he signed his paintings as the Master IW. The painting was discovered at the end of the 19th century in the parish church, formerly the Augustinian Monastery Church of St. Laurence in Šopka (now Pšovka near Mělník), and is exhibited in the Gallery and Museum of the Litoměřice Diocese.

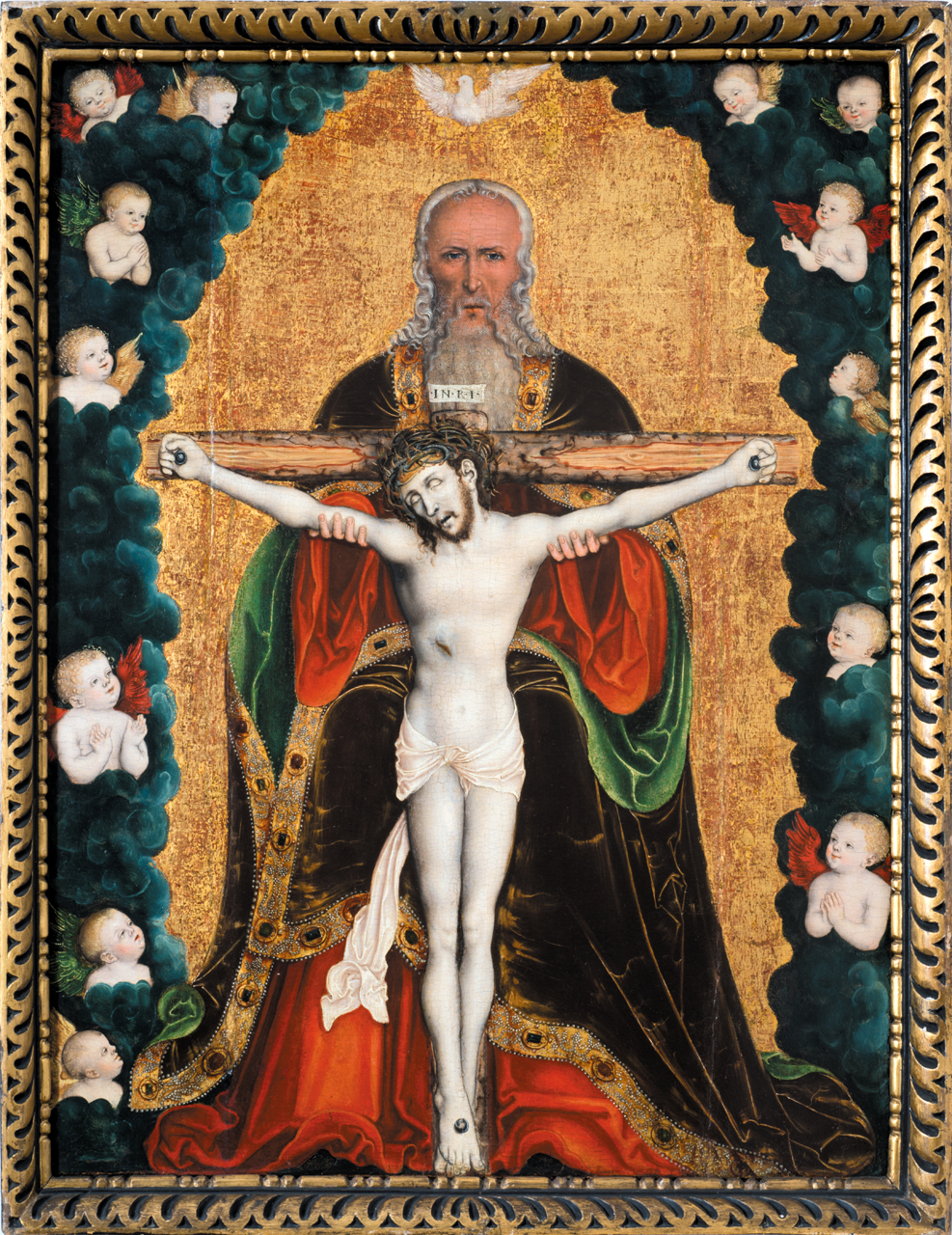
Master IW, Votive painting from Šopka (1530), reverse with the Holy Trinity

== Description and classification ==
Double-sided painting in oil tempera on wooden panel 81 x 62 cm. The panel was originally larger and its current dimensions are the result of a cutting in 1662, when it was inserted into a Baroque edifice, or in 1896, when it was reframed. In the Baroque period it was partially, but fortunately unusually sensibly, repainted, thus suppressing its original rich colour. At the same time the background of the back of the panel was repainted and decorated with painted ornament.

The panel was discovered in 1892 by L. Böhm in the sacristy of the parish church of St. Lawrence. Shortly afterwards it was described by Karel Chytil and was to be given to the public picture gallery. The painting was restored in 1896 by J. Heřman (a report on its condition before restoration is given by F. X. Jiřík) and again in 1962–1963 by J. Blažej. The last restoration removed the Baroque overpainting and restored the original authentic appearance of the work. On the front of the panel behind the Death's feet is the signature of the Master IW and an incompletely preserved date, probably 1530.

This votive painting has no direct analogues in domestic or foreign works. The artistic conception, the character of the painting and the execution itself place it among the top works of Master IW. In terms of quality it is comparable to one of Cranach's most important works – his Prague Altarpiece, which was undoubtedly known to Master IW. It is even possible that Master IW, as one of Cranach's most gifted pupils, may have been involved in the creation of this retable. The altar was commissioned before 1520, when the painter was working as a journeyman in Cranach's workshop.

The two sides of the panel can be understood in a unity of content. The Sorrowful Christ or the risen Saviour and victor over death has his hands raised as in the depictions of the Last Judgement and shows the wounds – a symbol of the sacrifice made for the sake of the vindication of mankind. In conjunction with the adoration of the donor, Christ represents the mediator between God and man and is depicted in the spirit of the mystery of the Trinity as the believer's gateway to the kingdom of heaven. On the reverse side is depicted the God of Grace (the Throne of Grace, "Gnadenstuhl", lat. sedes gratiae)) who sacrificed his son for the salvation of mankind. The high-resolution image as well as the Infrared reflectography is stored in the Cranach Digital Archive.

=== Front side ===
The front side of the board stands out from the rest of Master IW's work. Here the painter has shown an unusual degree of his own inventiveness and combinatory skills. The Donor kneels before the Sorrowful Christ and the Grim Reaper with a scythe and hourglass. The scene is framed by Renaissance architecture. In contrast to the well-known Zlíchov retable by Master IP, where Christ, at the intercession of the Virgin Mary, acts as a saviour from Death, this painting captures a situation that can be interpreted as a crucial fateful event. Christ standing between the supplicant and Death can be seen as a symbol of infinite grace, calling for the spiritual empowerment of human life through repentance and prayer. The painting is characterized by the extraordinary quality of execution, subtle gradations and careful handling of details. Compared to the works of Lucas Cranach the Elder, Master IW's painting is characterized by a greater softness of expression, emotionality and lyricism, which correspond to the domestic Czech artistic environment.

A similar theme is depicted in the earlier Votive Panel of the Švihovsky family (1504/05) from the workshop of Master of the Chudenický Altarpiece. The motif of the Sorrowful Christ with outstretched arms is known from a woodcut by Albrecht Dürer (1500), as is the painting of Death and the Hourglass (1510).

=== Reverse side ===
The back of the board depicts the Holy Trinity as the so-called "Throne of Grace". The enthroned God the Father, holding the crucified Jesus Christ, looks down with fixed eyes on the faithful, inviting them to personal contemplation of the divine mercy that sacrificed a son for the salvation of mankind and the redemption of sins. The gilded background is surrounded by clouds with figures of angels. The dove above the head of God the Father, symbolizing the Holy Spirit, was slightly damaged when the plate was cut. The whiteness of Christ's body contrasts with the red robe of God the Father and his brown velvet cloak with green lining. The painter took special care in depicting the gilded and precious-stone decorated border of the cloak.

Only ten years older (1520) is the Altarpiece with the Holy Trinity by the Master of the Litoměřice Altarpiece. Of Cranach's works, the Holy Trinity from the Castle Church in Chemnitz (1515–1525) is the closest to this painting in terms of composition.

=== Details of the painting ===
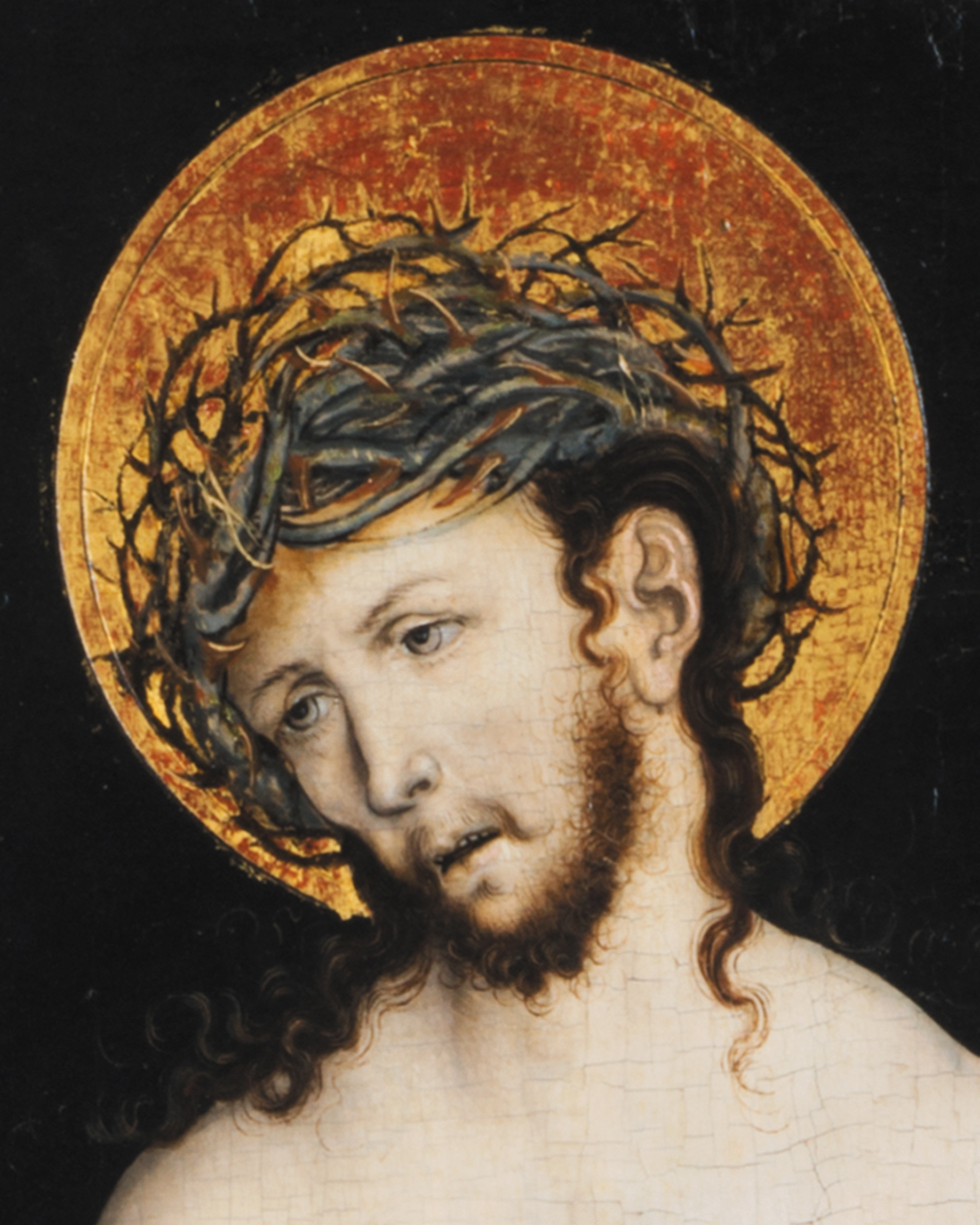
Head of Christ

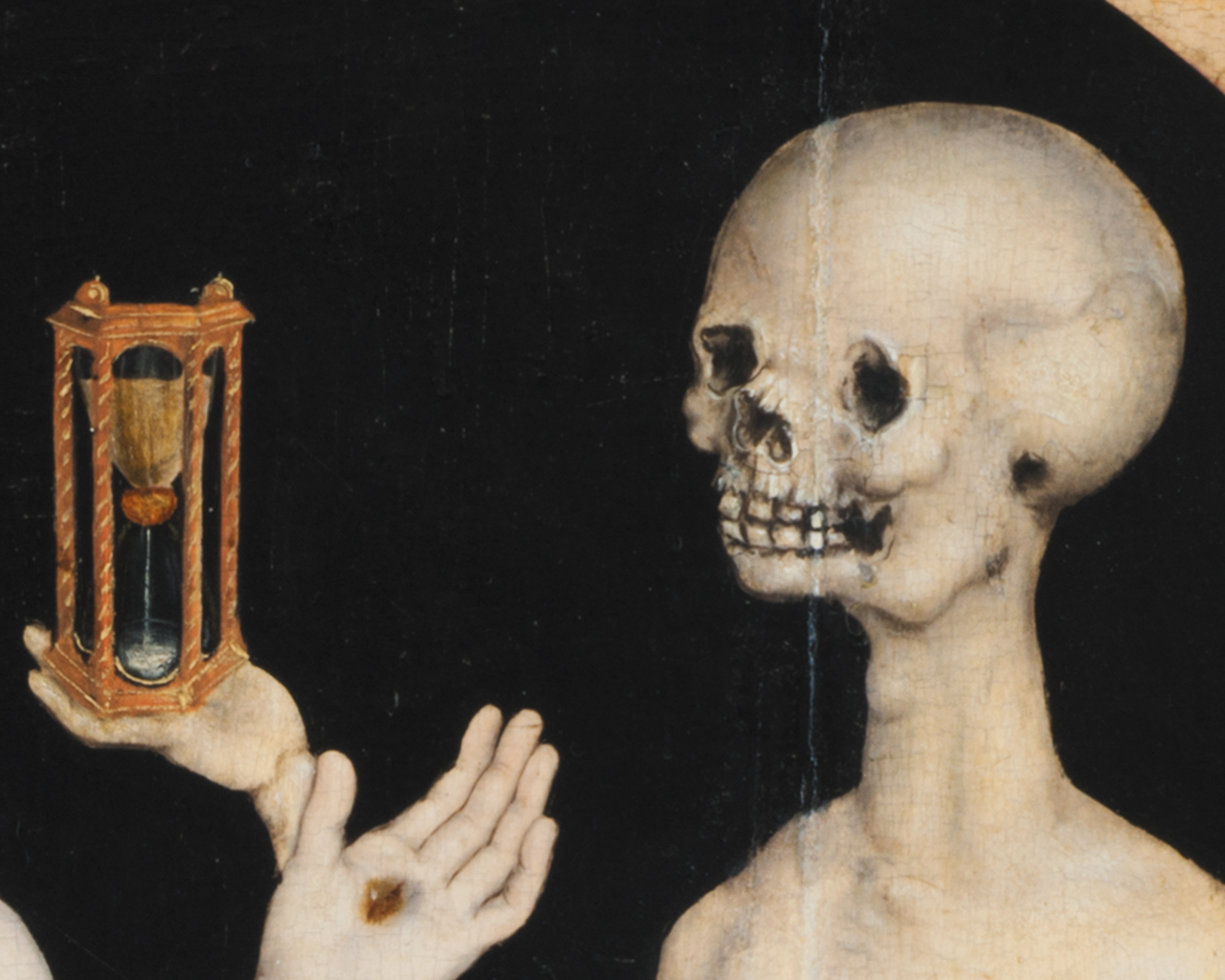
Head of the Grim Reaper with hourglass

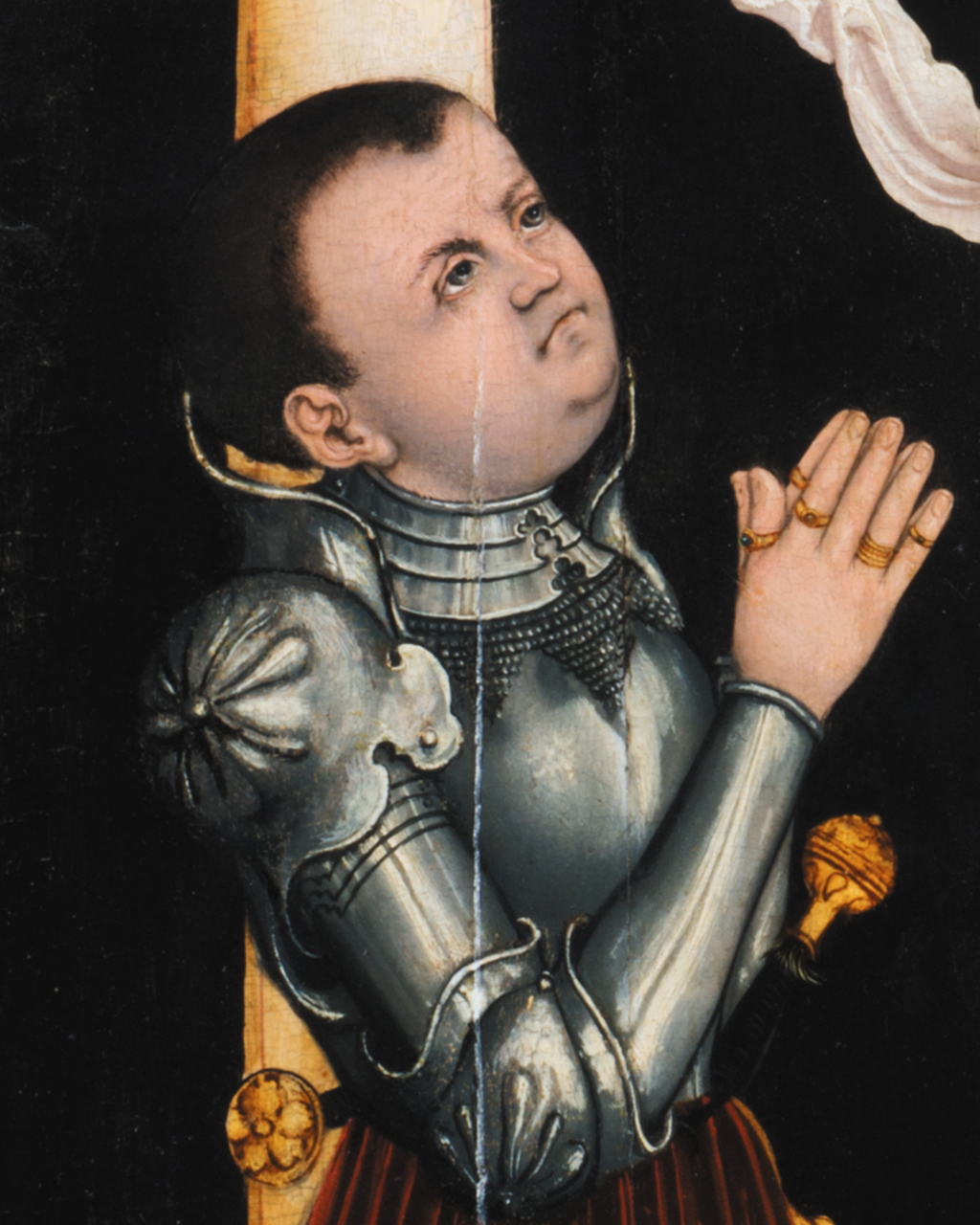
Kneeling donor

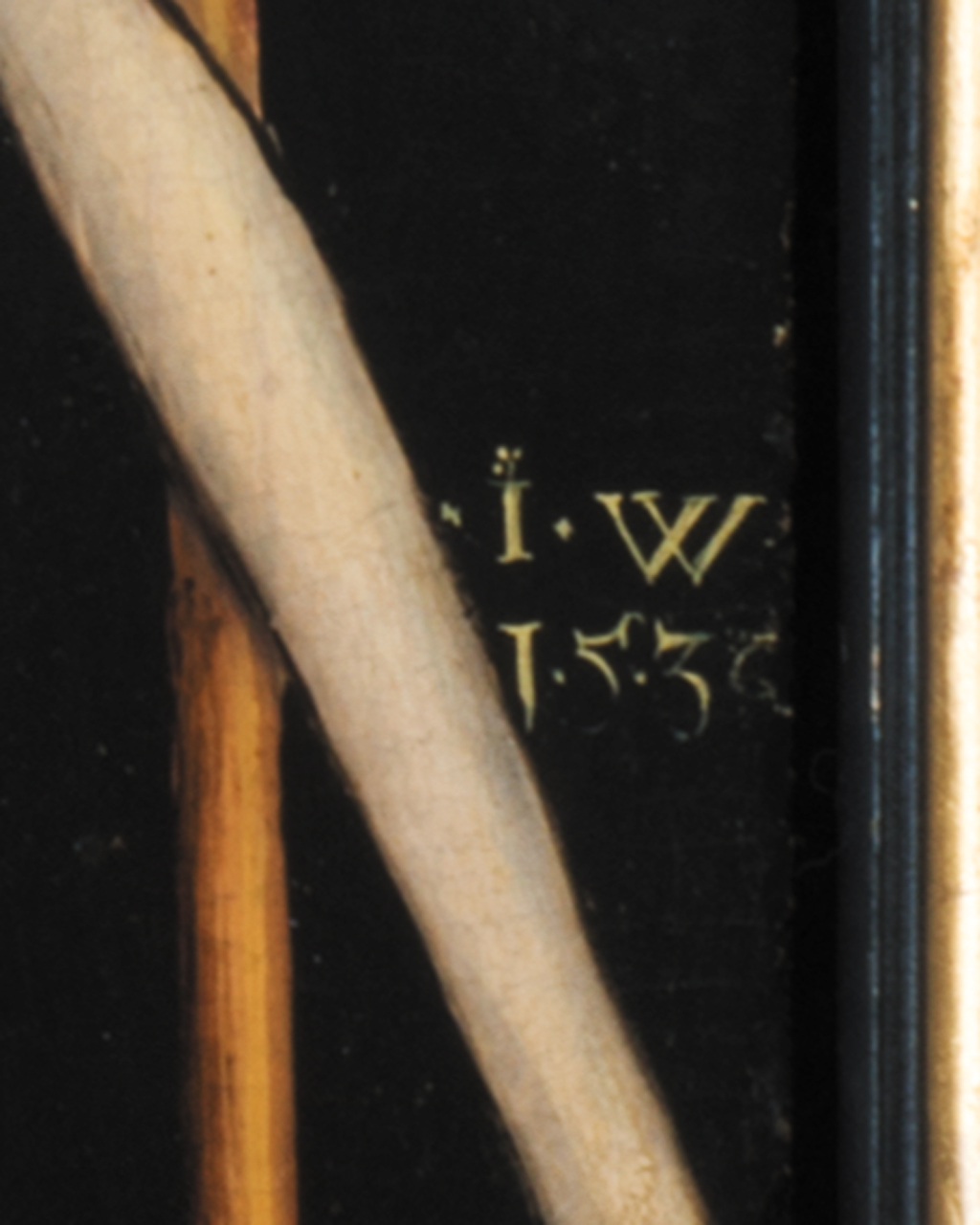
Signature and date

== History of the painting ==
The painting was preserved despite looting of the monastery in the early 17th century. It can be presumed that the donor of the painting was a nobleman buried in the church. The family burial ground in the sacristy of the church and the Marian chapel was founded by Zdislav Berka of Dubá and Lipá, but he only acquired the Mělník estate in 1542, which rules out his connection with the painting. At the time of the presumed creation of the Master IW's panel, the right of patronage was held by Radslav Beřkovský of Šebířov and Liběchov (1476–1537), a knight and between 1512–1523 and 1525–1537 the chief scribe and royal secretary. In 1529–31, Radslav Beřkovský was, along with Zdeněk Lev of Rožmitál and Vojtěch of Pernštejn (for the noble status), together with Volfart Planknar of Kynšperk, provincial governor for the knighthood. The nobleman depicted could also be Jaroslav Hasištejnský z Lobkovic (brother of Jan and Bohuslav Hasištejnský z Lobkovic), who resided in nearby Obříství and died in 1529. Three of his children, who died shortly after their birth, were buried in the monastery.

== Sources ==
- Hamsíková Magdalena, Recepce díla Lucase Cranacha st. v malířství první poloviny 16. století v Čechách / Reception of the work of Lucas Cranach Sr. in the painting of the first half of the 16th century in Bohemia, dissertation, Faculty of Arts, Charles University Prague, 2011
- Kesner, Ladislav st., Mistr IW – votivní obraz ze Pšovky s Kristem, Smrtí a prosebníkem, Mělník – Pšovka / Master IW – votive painting from Pšovka with Christ, Death and the supplicant, Mělník – Pšovka. Proceedings published on the occasion of the rededication of the church of St. Lawrence in Mělník-Pšovka restored after the flood of 2002. 15 August 2004 / Špačková, Renata Mělník : Město Mělník, 2004, 92 p., il., pp. 54–61, ISBN 80-239-3338-8
- Macek Petr, Beránek Jan, Zahradník Pavel: Bývalý klášter bosých augustiniánů v Pšovce u Mělníka / The former monastery of the barefoot Augustinians in Pšovka near Mělník, in: Průzkumy památek VIII, no. 2, 2001, pp. 7–37
- Kesner Ladislav, Mistr IW / Master IW, Galerie výtvarného umění Litoměřice 1993
- Pešina Jaroslav, Paralipomena k dějinám českého malířství pozdní gotiky a renesance. Osm kapitol dodatků an oprav k české malbě deskové 1450–1550 / Paralipomena to the History of Czech Painting of the Late Gothic and Renaissance. Eight chapters of additions and corrections to Czech panel painting 1450–1550, Chapter VI, pp. 325–375 in: Umění XV, 1967, Praha
- Kohoutek J, Oprava votivního obrazu ze Šopky od Mistra IW / Repair of a votive painting from Šopka by Master IW, in: Umění XII, s. 616–621, 1964
- Pešina Jaroslav, Česká malba pozdní gotiky a renesance / Czech Painting of the Late Gothic and Renaissance, Prague 1950, pp. 82–83, p. 130, cat. no. 383-384
- Matějček A, Nepoznaný obraz monogramisty IW v Praze / The unrecognized painting of the IW monogramist in Prague, in. Kniha o Praze. Pražský almanach II., Prague 1931
- Chytil Karel: České malířství prvního desetiletí XVI. století, in: Ročenka kruhu pro pěstování dějin umění za rok 1930 / Czech Painting of the First Decade of the XVIth Century, in: Yearbook of the Circle for the Cultivation of Art History for 1930, 1931, pp. 34–35
