= Josef Kramolín =

Czech Jesuit brother and painter

Josef Kramolín (11 April 1730 – 27 April 1802) was a Czech Jesuit brother and painter. He primarily painted religious-themed frescoes.

== Early life ==
The registry records in Nymburk parish show a record of the baptism of 12 April 1730. He was baptized as Josef Karel. His parents were already permanently settled in Nymburk, named Joseph George Kramolín (1706 - 1733) and Barbara, née White (1701-1751). Kramolín had two siblings, a brother Wenceslas (1733-1799), who was also a painter by vocation, and a sister, Barbara, Dorothy (1732 -?).

Kramolín was guided by his parents to sing, and in 1743 he worked briefly in a chorus in the St. Vitus Cathedral in Prague. He also lived in a Benedictine monastery in the church. After Prague began besieging Prussians he briefly returned to Nymburk, then soon went to Kutná Hora, in seminars at the church to complete his education. In Kutna Hora he received the rudiments of the art of painting from the artist Vit Hrdlicka. In 1751 Kramolín 's mother died, so he returned to Nymburk, and became a painter. He later moved to Prague, where he became an apprentice to Franz Xaver Palko, who was working on the frescoes in the Jesuit church of St. Nicholas in Prague. From that experience he got the basics, and learned to mix colors and perfected his drawing style. At this time, he got his first individual contract.

== Career ==
In 1757 he went to Vienna, where on 5 October 1757 he studied at Hofakademie der Maler, Bildhauer und Baukunst (Imperial and Royal Court Academy of painters, sculptors and architecture). At the Vienna Academy he remained only a few months, and in April of the following year was admitted as a novice in the Jesuit order in Prague. As a lay brother he worked until the Order's suppression in 1773. The archives can be found records of his stay on the Order track - in 1758 was listed as a novice in Brno, and in 1759 as a novice in college at St. Nicholas in Prague's Lesser Town. Between 1760 - 1770 he was listed as a lay brother in college at St. Clement in the Old Town of Prague (Clementinum), in 1771 again at St. Nicholas, and in 1772 in Chomutov. During this period he painted mainly altar architecture in monastic churches.

After the abolition of the Jesuit order he became a freelance artist. during his studies he met Catherine Weczerschic, with whom he went to her home town of Karlovy Vary, and married on 2 May 1775. In Karlovy Vary they bought a house in the Spanish Cross, later still house the Blue Star. In 1802 he became a painter to the city council. In Prague's Strahov library is a record of his visit: "Di 10 Decembris A 1799. Josephus Kramolin Frater Senior exjesuita Pictor Historiarum Carolo Thermensis." He died in Karlovy Vary of pneumonia in April 1802.

== Style ==
He belonged to a generation of Czech late Baroque artists. Some of his surviving works can be found at Mariánská Týnice and the Church of the Assumption of the Virgin Mary
