= Altarpiece of the Holy Trinity (Master of the Litoměřice Altarpiece) =

Triptych by the Master of the Litoměřice Altarpiece

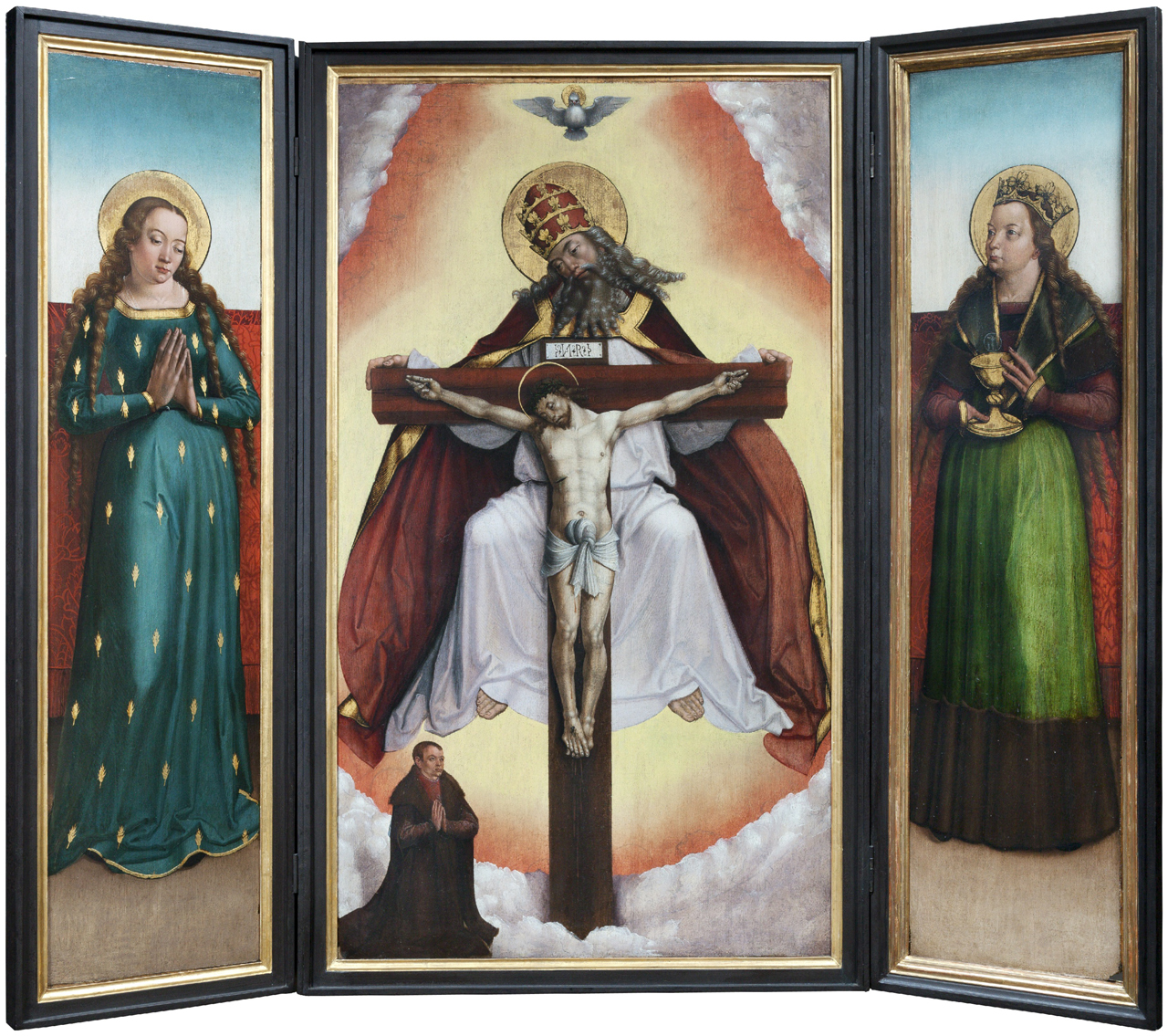
The Altarpiece of the Holy Trinity (Master of the Litoměřice Altarpiece), National Gallery Prague

The Altarpiece of the Holy Trinity is a painted altarpiece by the Master of the Litoměřice Altarpiece dating from c. 1520. It is now in the National Gallery in Prague.

== History and description ==
The three-part altarpiece with wings painted on both sides was part of the Schäffner collection. It was purchased for the National Gallery in Prague, Collection of Old Art from J. Kretschmer in Prague in 1937. The relatively small size of the stand suggests that it was originally meant for the side altar of a church or else for a private domestic chapel.

The altarpiece is composed of a central panel measuring 128.5 x 76 cm and two hinged wings 39 cm wide. The Throne of Grace (in Latin ‘Thronus gratiae’, in German ‘Gnadenstuhl’, in French ‘Trône de grâce’) depicted on the central panel is an iconographical type used c. 1120 in the Cambrai Missal. It is accompanied by images of the Virgin Mary in a Wheat-ear Dress (in German: "Maria im Ährenkleid") and St Barbara.

In the bottom left-hand corner there kneels a donor portrait, greatly reduced in size compared with the sacred figures, of an unknown layman adoring the Holy Trinity with clasped hands. The enthroned God the Father with a Papal tiara on his head shows the faithful his crucified son, thus inviting them to personally contemplate on God's mercy that, for the salvation of humanity, sacrificed Jesus Christ. The faithful are meant to participate in, or at least better comprehend, the grief of the Father at the loss of his only Son who was sacrificed for our redemption. The tortured body of Christ - the Man of Sorrows is the ‘vir dolorum’ of Isaiah’s prophecy about the suffering servant. The dove above the head of God the Father symbolises the Holy Spirit.

The altarpiece is a unique arrangement of symbols. On the right wing there is the Madonna in the Wheat-ear Dress, her hands clasped in prayer, in a dress decorated with ears of wheat and in a gilt-hemmed bodice that has, here, replaced the usual collar with sunrays. Along with images of the Madonna as a servant in the temple, this Marian motif is typical of the early 15th century. The theological reference to the portrayal of the Virgin Mary appears in the Song of Solomon 7;2: ‘Your belly is a heap of wheat encircledwith lilies’. Here, the Virgin Mary is identified with the earth bearing its fruits even without being sown; she is seen as an unploughed field that, even so, brings forth ears of wheat because it is the field of God. The ears of wheat themselves symbolise the body of Christ (the living Eucharist), the Bread of Angels and the wisdom of God. The motif of the sunray collar also has its symbolic origin in the Song of Solomon (6:10):‘You are as majestic as the morning sky — glorious as the moon — blinding as the sun!’. In European culture, the characteristically waving hair symbolises virginity, though also obedience and devotion to the Grace of God that created the Son of God.

On the left wing there is St Barbara in period clothes carrying a chalice and host. St Barbara, a virgin and martyr and one of the Fourteen Holy Helpers, was popular in the Middle Ages as the Patron of Good Death to whom people turned in difficult moments such as during plague epidemics. It is said of St Barbara that, out of reverence towards the Holy Trinity, she had a third window created in the building where she was imprisoned.

On the rear of the hinged panels there are the Bohemian patron saints – on the left is St Wenceslaus in a ducal hat, with a banner bearing the St Wenceslaus eagle and in period Renaissance armour and a white tunic. On the left there is King Sigismund of Burgundy with his attributes – a royal crown, orb and sceptre. The remains of both saints are placed in St Vitus Cathedral and were already the object of worship under the reign of Charles IV. Vladislaus II Jagiellon consciously followed on in the older tradition dating from the era of the Luxembourg dynasty, having the same patron saints painted on his Křivoklát Castle Altarpiece.

== Composition and style ==
The Master of the Litoměřice Altar's facial type is characterised by slender noses, plastically modelled faces with rounded chins and accentuated eyelids. His figures have soft wavy whiskers and hair. The painting technique used in highlighting the muscles and anatomical details reveals the underdrawing shining through in places. The painter's heightened interest in realist depiction is clear, for example, in the painting of the hands that are no longer indicated in outline but have correctly depicted joints and muscles. Light stems from a single source and, together with colour, creates volumes and softens the silhouettes. Figures cast real shadows.

The composition of the central picture has a decorative symmetry and uses the contrast and combination of unusual colours in order to accentuate the plastic effect of Christ's body. Out of the sulphur-yellow heavenly glow there extends out towards us the red protective cloak of God the Father that contrasts in its colour with the whitish gown spread over his knees. The violet hue of the gown, caused by the use of fluorite pigment, is typical of the Master of the Litoměřice Altarpiece, however it also appears in south German and Tyrolian painting at the turn of the 16th century.

The style of the drapery with its long parallel folds is more natural and doesn't cover the bodily quality of the figures and their verticality, but on the contrary accentuates them. The stylistic transformation and Renaissance style that was imported to Bohemia from Saxony, replacing the earlier Gothic dramatic tension, is characterised by a static quality and symmetry of the composition, less interest in spatial concerns and an overall calming of the image's character.

== Sources ==
- Jiří Fajt, Štěpánka Chlumská, Čechy a střední Evropa 1200–1550, Národní galerie v Praze, 2014, ISBN 978-80-7035-569-5, p. 118
- Vítězslav Štajnochr, Panna Maria Divotvůrkyně. Nauka o Panně Marii, mariánská ikonografie, mariánská poutní místa, 326 pp, Slovácké muzeum Uherské Hradiště, 2000, ISBN 80-86185-10-9
- Petra Fialová, Panna Maria Klasová. Muzejní a vlastivědná práce, 1995, No. 3
- James Hall, Dictionary of Subjects and Symbols in Art, Routledge, London 2014, ISBN 978-0813343938
- Jaroslav Pešina, In: Pozdně gotické umění v Čechách, Odeon, Praha 1985, p. 367
- Jaroslav Pešina, Mistr Litoměřický, Nakladatelství ČVU, Praha 1958, pp. 17–18
- Jaroslav Pešina, Česká malba pozdní gotiky a renesance. Deskové malířství 1450–1550, Orbis, Praha 1950
