= Church of the Assumption of the Virgin Mary (Most) =

- Kostel Nanebevzetí Panny Marie
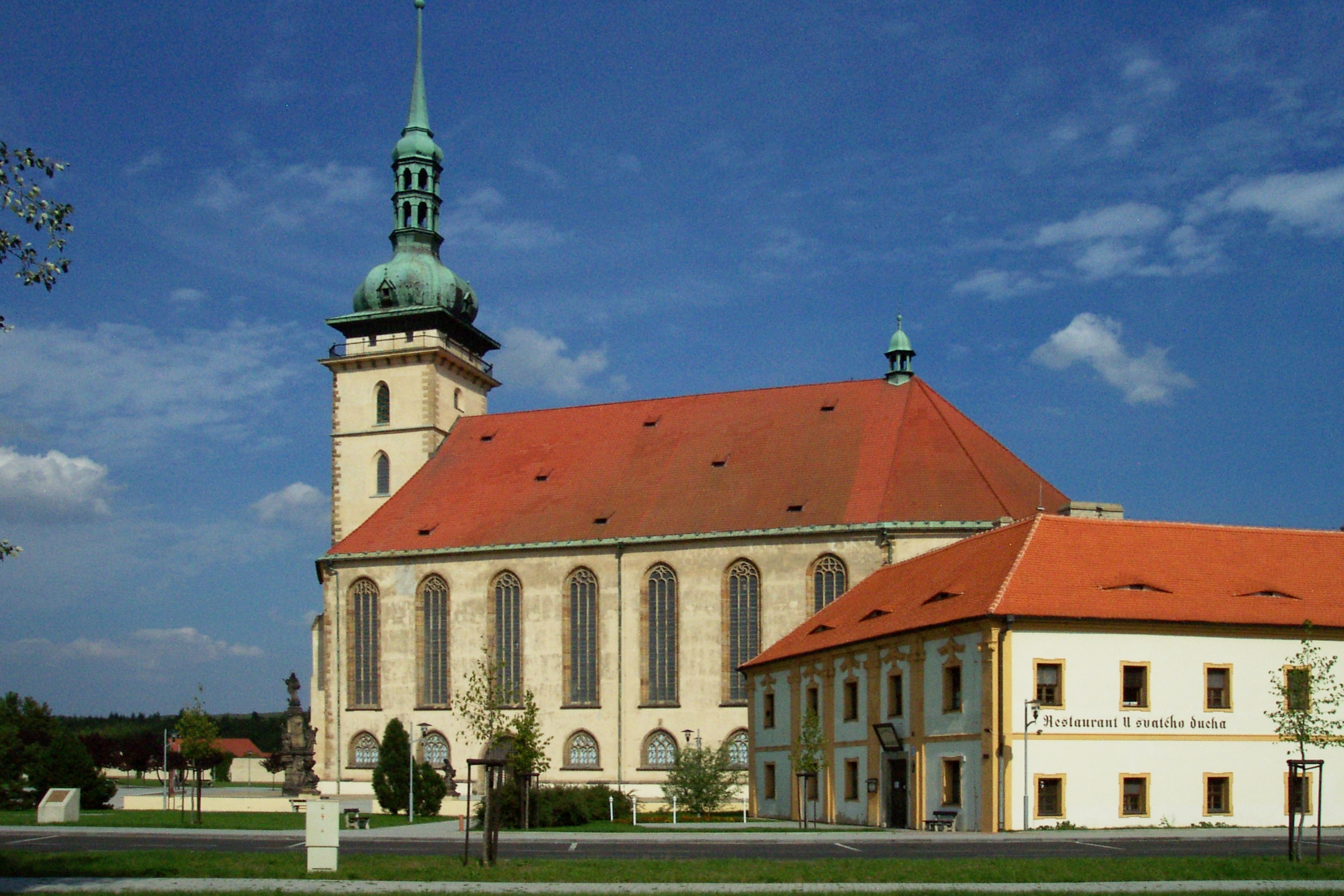
- Side view, in the foreground the Hospital of the Holy Spirit

- Location in Czech Republic
- 50°31′04″N 13°38′56″E
- Location: Most
- Country: Czech Republic
- Denomination: Catholic
- Website: www.kostel-most.cz/en

History
- Status: Active
- Dedication: Assumption of Mary
- Consecrated: 1597 and 1993

Architecture
- Functional status: Parish church
- Architect: Jakob Heilmann
- Architectural type: Church
- Style: Gothic
- Groundbreaking: 20 August 1517

Specifications
- Length: 60 m (196 ft 10 in)
- Width: 30 m (98 ft 5 in)
- Height: 31.10 m (102 ft 0 in)

Administration
- Diocese: Litoměřice

Clergy
- Bishop: Jan Baxant

The Church of the Assumption of the Virgin Mary (Czech: kostel Nanebevzetí Panny Marie) is a late Gothic church in Most in the Ústí nad Labem Region of the Czech Republic.

== Previous building ==
The deanery church in Most, which stood in the middle of the church yard near the road to Žatec, burned down in 1515, and only the eastern crypt and the inner peripheral brickwork of the western tower could be saved. (The foundation of this church is indicated in 1253 till 1257 and indirectly proven by a document of Pope Boniface VIII from 1296. The construction was originally an early Gothic basilica of three naves.)

== Construction ==
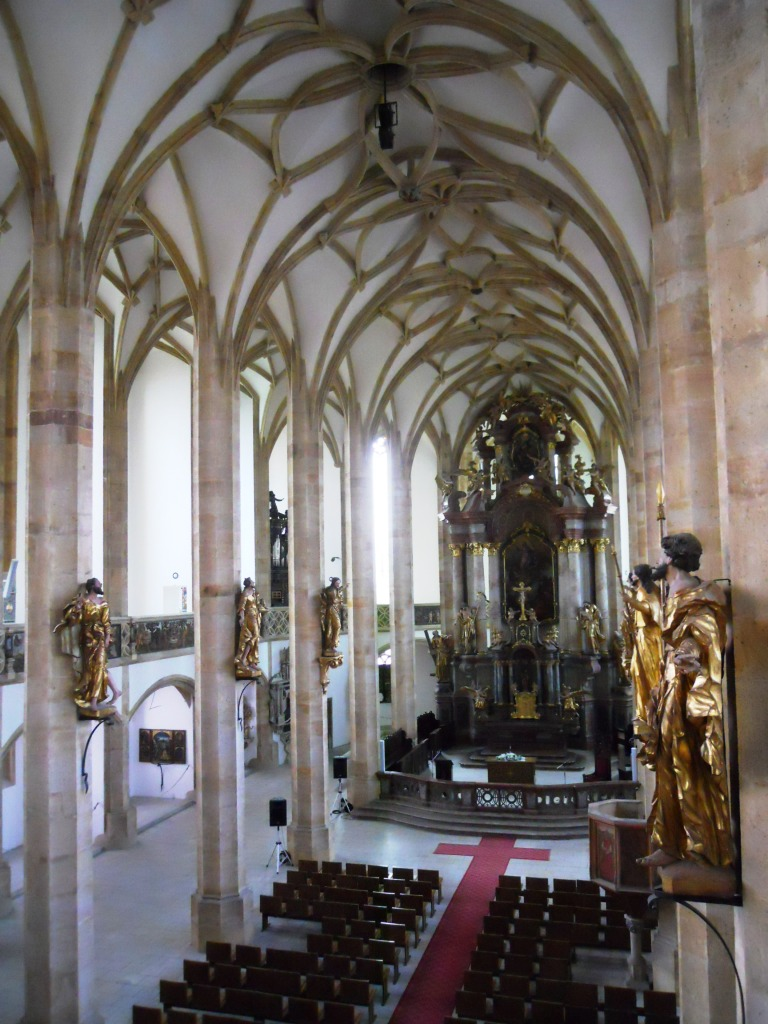
The interior towards the main altar

The building of the new church began on 20 August 1517, when the cornerstone was laid, and was financed by individual donors. The designer was Jakob Heilmann from Schweinfurt. He proposed the church as a big hall of three naves, with inside supports, a pentagonal presbytery and a prismatic tower with a gallery in the main elevation. The northern wall contains a vestibule, and a sacristy is located in the north-western wall.

During the first year, demolition work was carried out. Heilmann handed over the project in 1518, and control of the building works was taken over initially by the foreman Jörg (Georg) of Maulbron and later by another foreman called Peter (possibly Heilmann). The vaults of the peripheral chapels were finished during the second decade of the 16th century, then the inner pillars were erected and in 1532 the church was prepared for vaulting. Then, the windows were placed and the vaulting ribs were dressed. The carcassing was finished in 1549 and the renaissance portals installed in the second half of the 16th century. Unfortunately the church burnt out in 1578, and was finally repaired by 1602. The church was consecrated in 1597.

== Later repairs ==
A new roof was put on the church in 1650. The actual main altar was constructed during 1735–1739. The altar decoration was made in the workshop of the sculptor Bartoloměj Eder and the main altar picture was produced by Josef Kramolín – both in 1773. A boundary wall round the cemetery, church and the ossuary was demolished in 1840. Another big repair was made during 1880–1883, during which the interior was reshaped into the Gothic style, and a part of the baroque inventory was removed. New gothic paint was used, and equipment was installed in the new gothic style. The plaster renovation of the outer walls, as well as a treatment of the stone parts was made in 1932.

== Transport of the building ==
During the 1960s, Most's historic centre was completely demolished to make room for the expanding lignite mines, a process that lasted until 1980. Unlike other historical buildings it was decided to save the church by moving it away from mining area.

An expert committee was set up by the Ministry of Culture of Czechoslovakia to supervise the project, presided over by academician Stanislav Bechyně. From 1969 the committee was led by Alois Myslivec. The important specialist-adviser was Emmanuel Gendel (1903-1994), well-known Soviet construction engineer, who subsequently became the USSR's leading specialist in moving buildings in the 1930s.

To move the building, a variant on a bow path was chosen. The transfer was overseen by the firm Transfera Praha, an organisation of the Czech Ministry of Culture, and was performed by Průmstav Pardubice and Škoda Plzeň.

Prior to moving the building, the peripheral masonry, the bearing and supporting pillars were reinforced, and the remainder of the western tower was demolished. The church circumference was reinforced by a concrete ring and the church was gripped by a steel framework construction on the inner as well as outer sides. The preparation work lasted seven years, as it was also necessary to demolish all houses in the transfer path and fill in the former opencast mine.

53 transport trucks were set on special rails, which were inserted under all statically important points of the building. These transport trucks worked using computer controlled hydraulics, as were four booms used to pull the church. During movement of the church on the road section, rails which had already been passed over were moved from behind the building to in front of it, allowing them to be used again.

Between 30 September and 27 October 1975, the church was moved a distance of 841.1 metres (2,760 feet) at a velocity of 1–3 centimetres (0.39–1.18 inches) per minute to the vicinity of the old hospital with a small church of the Holy Spirit, and it was set on an iron-concrete two-storied foundation. After the move was completed, restoration work went on until 1988, and the church was solemnly consecrated again in 1993.

This building was mentioned in the Guinness Book of World Records as the heaviest building ever moved on wheels (12,700 t).

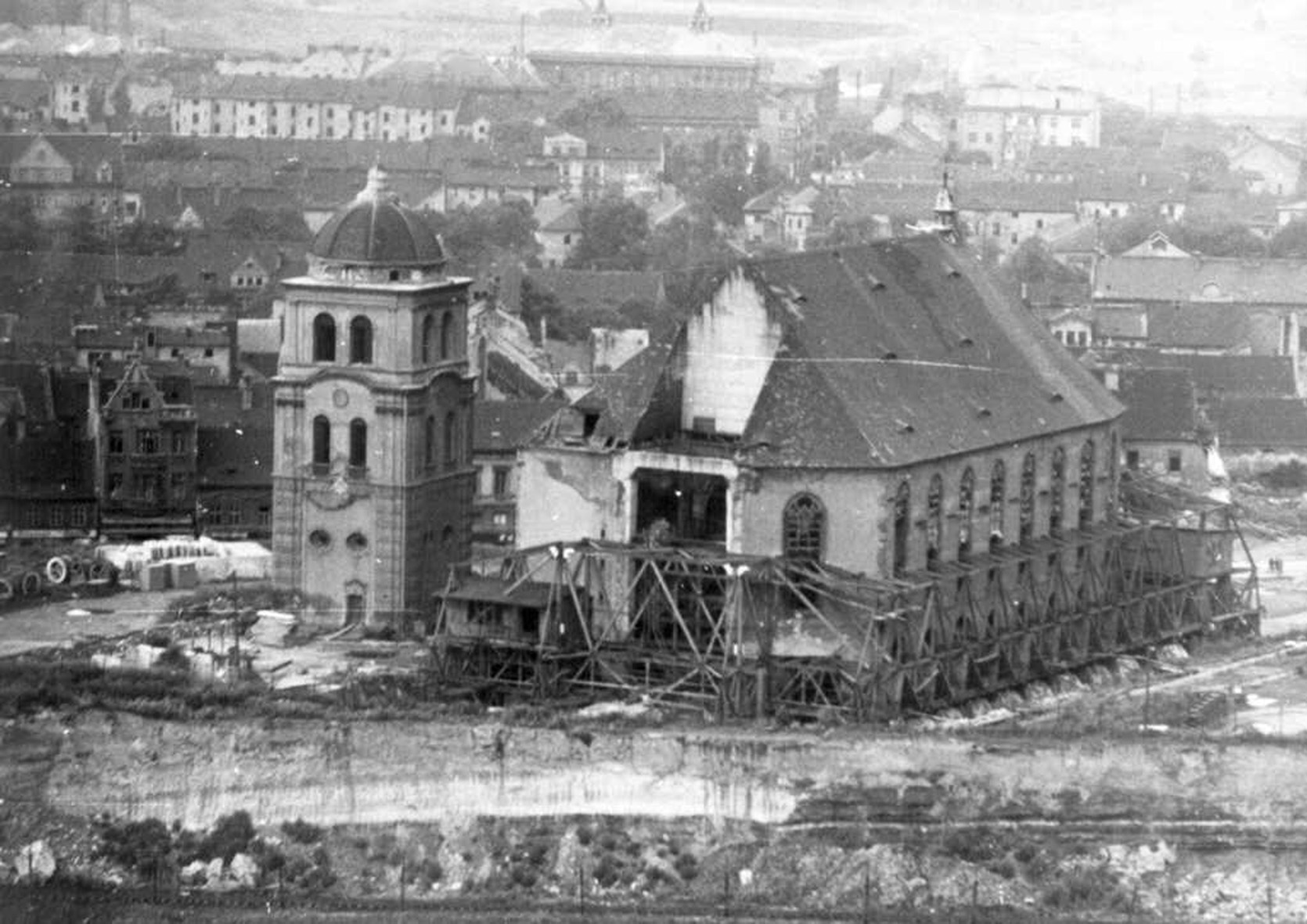
The church, surrounded by steel supports before the move

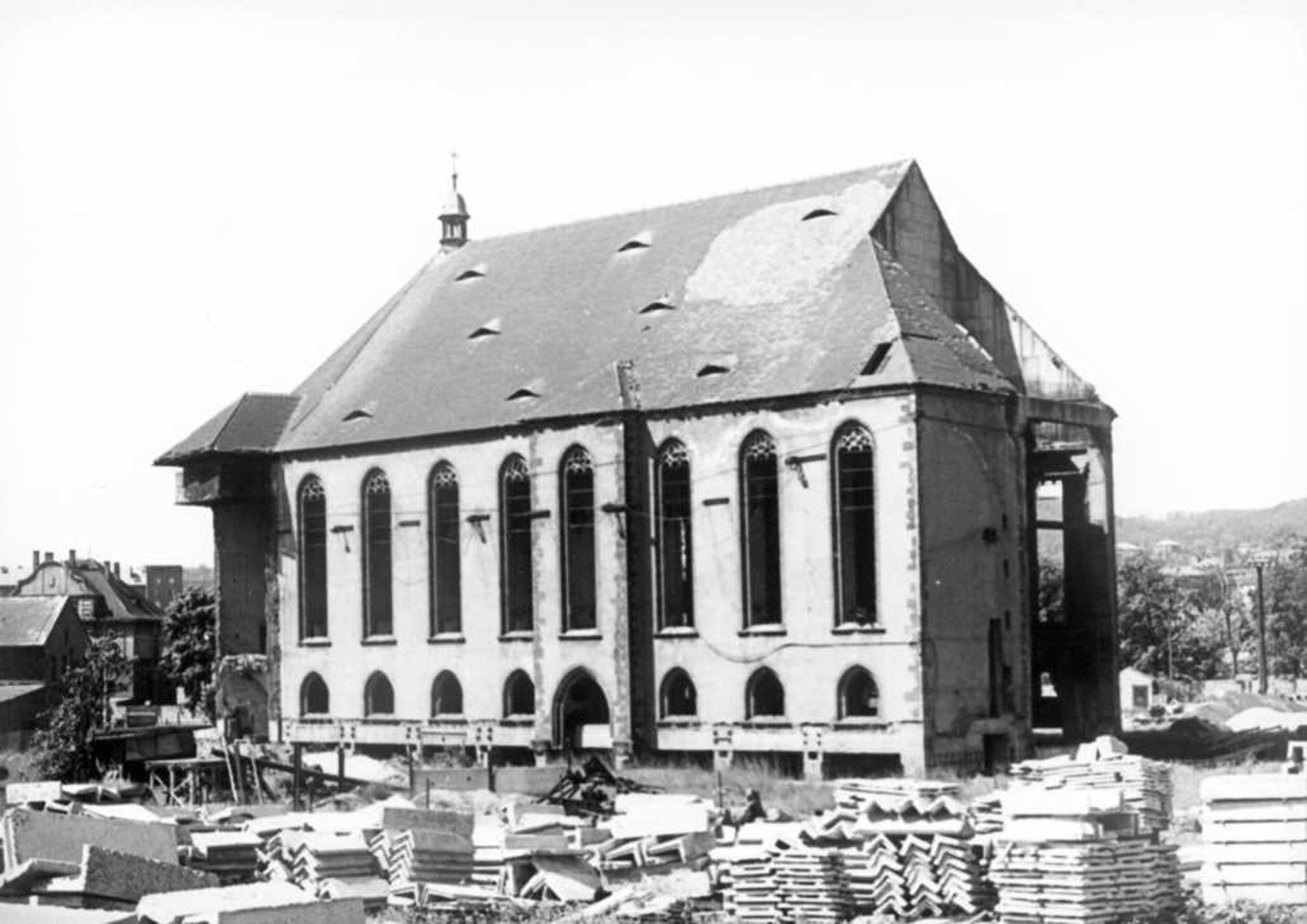
The church, unloaded in its new location

== Former location in present days ==
The area that the church used to occupy was not damaged by the mining activity. As such, it has become part of the shore of the Most Lake, an artificial lake created by flooding the former mine.

In 2023, a memorial was built on the site. It consists of a gravel path outlining the church's walls, and a total of 28 sweet chestnut trees, which are planted inside the path and also mark the position of the inner columns. Adjacent to the memorial is a small patch, where four pieces of the rail that carried the church are located.

The memorial, as well as the former site, can be found on these coordinates: 50°31′23″N 13°38′30″E

== Architecture ==
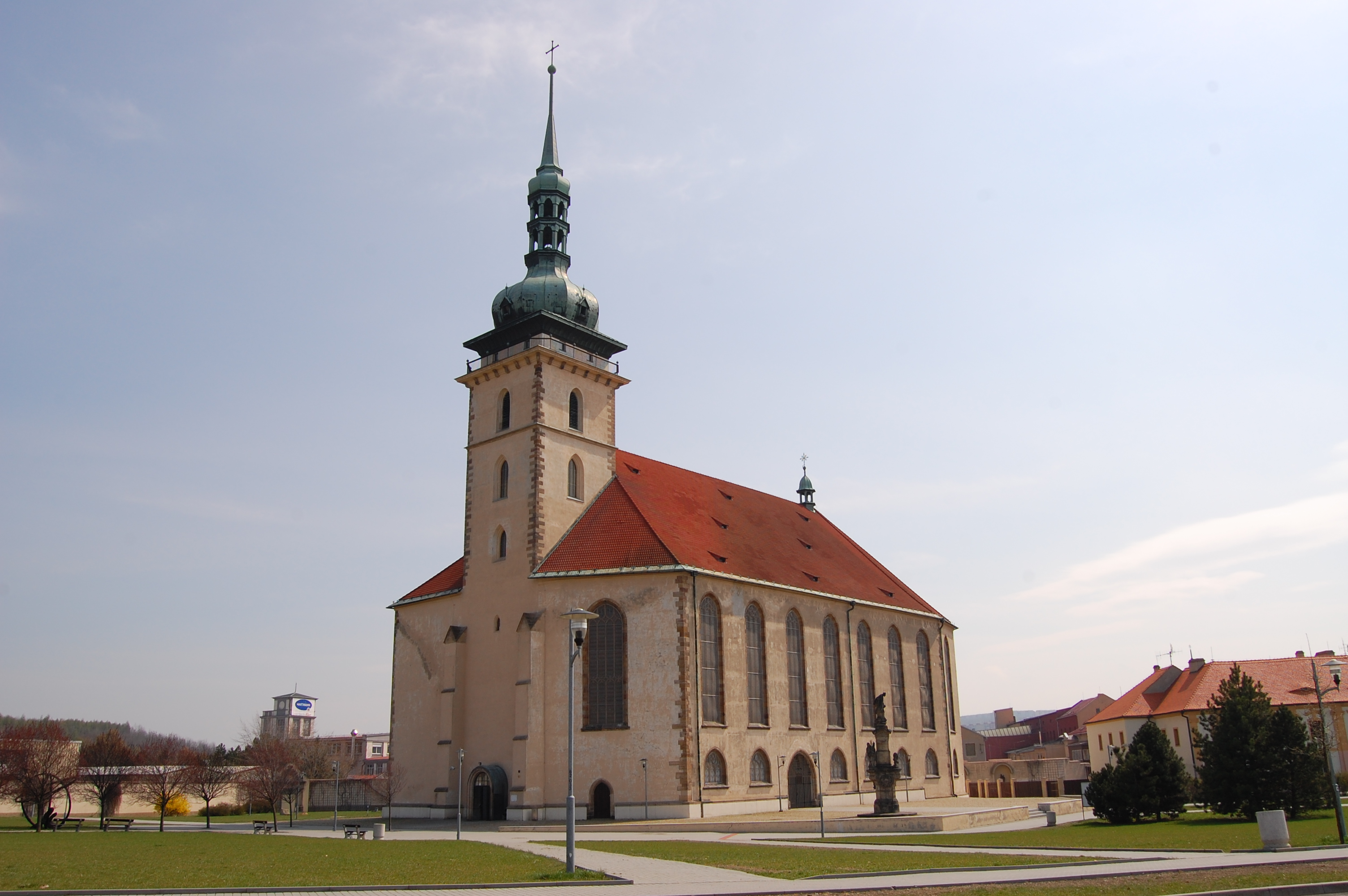
Front view

The church is 60 m long and 30 m wide has only one tower, conforming to the South-German late-gothic layout. Its interior walls are plain, and the peripheral walls are broken by two rows of windows. The lower windows belong to the individual chapels and the upper ones belong to the flank naves of the hall. The inside of the church forms a big hall, divided into three naves by seven pairs of octahedral columns. Between the counterforts are 16 chapels, two side vestibules, a sacristy, a double worm staircase on the eastern side and a worm staircase on the western side. Each of the chapels has its own ribbed vault and is dedicated to the patron saints of its donors — the guilds, rich citizens and one to St. Bartholomew, patron saint of the abbot Bartoloměj of Osek.

The church is used both for religious services as well as an exposition of the Gothic and Renaissance art of the north-western Bohemia, and the church basement is used as an exhibition space for the North-Bohemian Gallery.

Prior to the transport, the church was oriented (the chancel was located at the eastern end). But since the church was moved on a curved path, the chancel now faces south.

== Graves ==
Buried inside

- Markéta of Kunštát and Poděbrady († 1473)
- Bušek of Žeberk (†1499)
- Vilém of Žeberk († 1500)
- Alžběta of Riesenberk († 1507)
- Markéta Schlick († 1541)
- Anna of Mansfeld († 1548)
- Mořic Schlick († 1578)
- Barbora Schlicková († 1597)
- Joachim Andreas von Schlick († 1621)

Buried outside

- Jos. Fr. Löwe of Erlsfeld († 1715)
