= Prague Altarpiece of Lucas Cranach the Elder =

Painting by Lucas Cranach the Elder

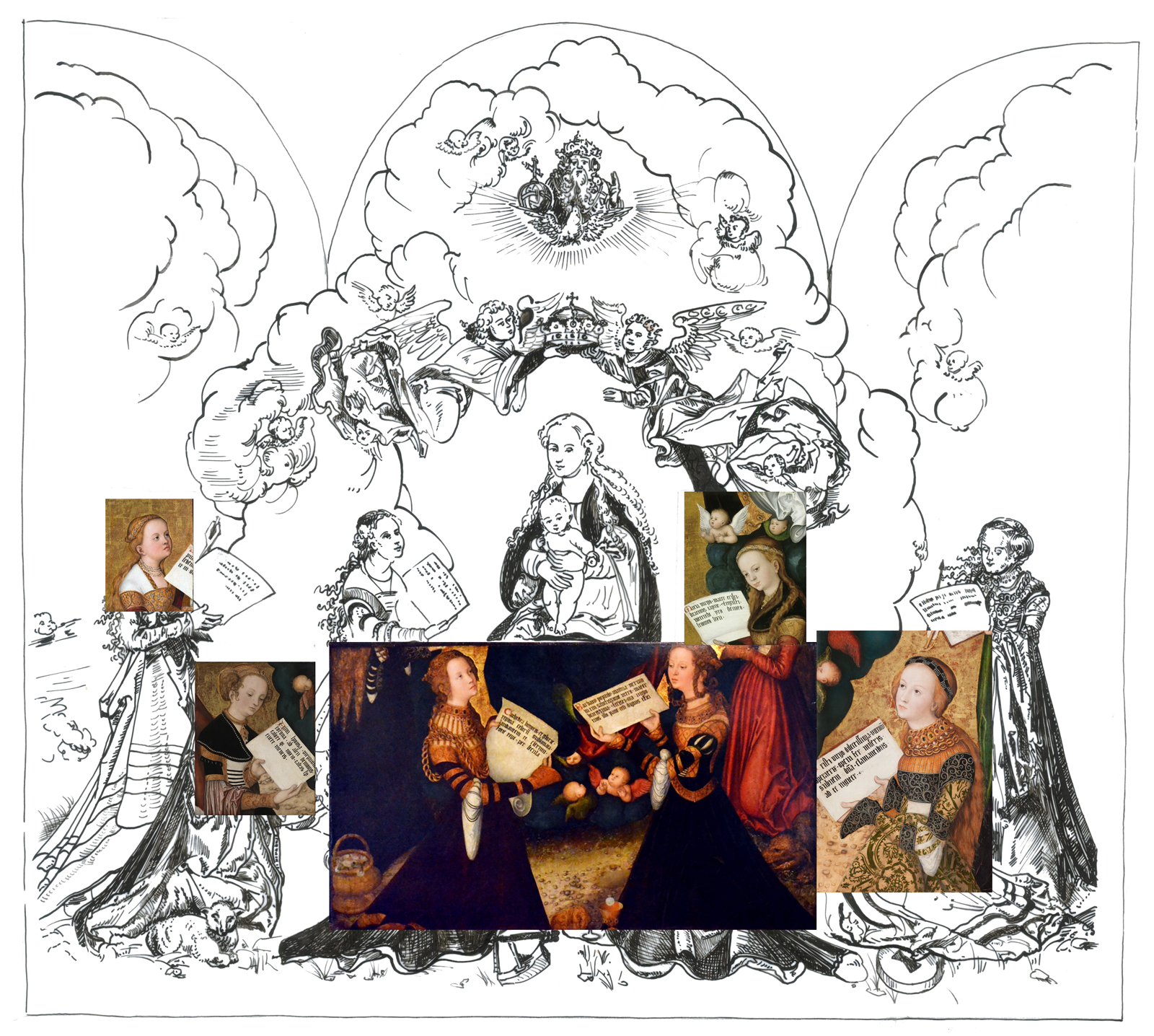
Prague Altarpiece, original size circa 230 x 370 cm. Drawing by Dagmar Hamsíková, reconstruction by Jindřich Nosek

The Prague Altarpiece (c. 1520) of Lucas Cranach the Elder portrays the Virgin Mary and female saints was, at the time it was made, the second most important altarpiece in St Vitus Cathedral. The altarpiece was most probably brought to Prague as a commission by Emperor Maximilian I. The reason for this could have been the betrothal of his granddaughter Mary to Louis II of Hungary, the engagement of Ferdinand I and Anna Jagiellon (1515) or the coronation of Mary of Habsburg as Queen of Bohemia (1522). A hundred years later, in 1619, the altarpiece fell victim to Calvinist iconoclasm. The figures of the female saints were cut out of it and its central part was destroyed.

== Description ==
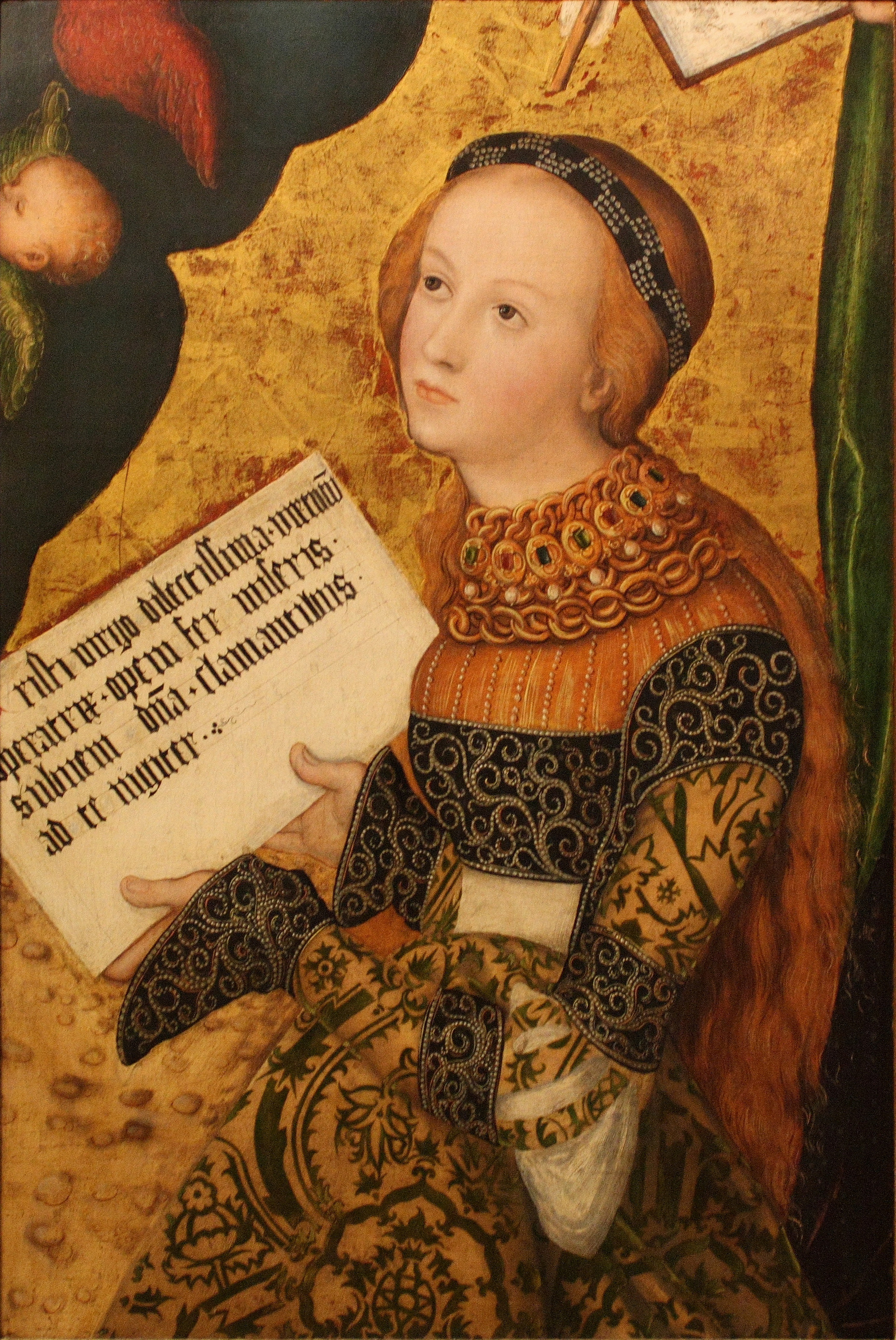
Prague Altarpiece: St Christina

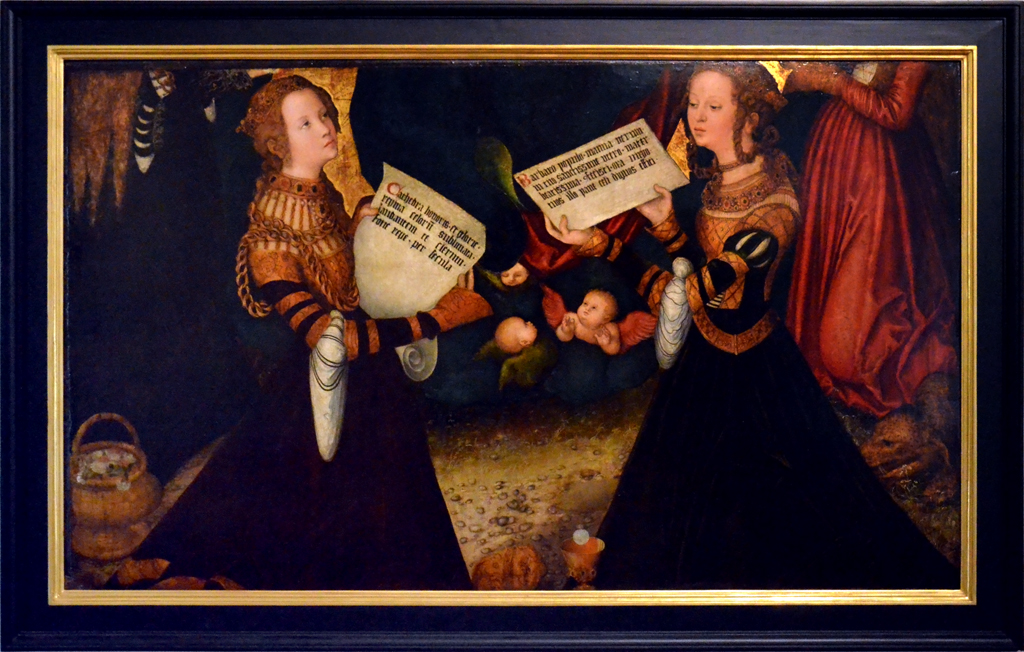
Prague Altarpiece: St Catherine and St Barbara

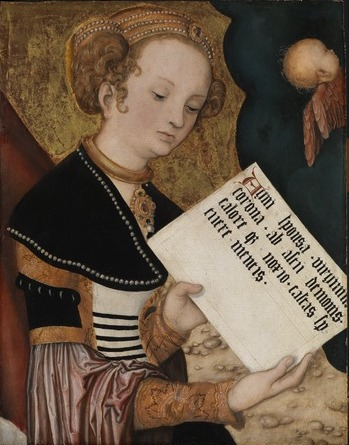
Prague Altarpiece: St Agnes, Staatliche Kunsthalle Karlsruhe

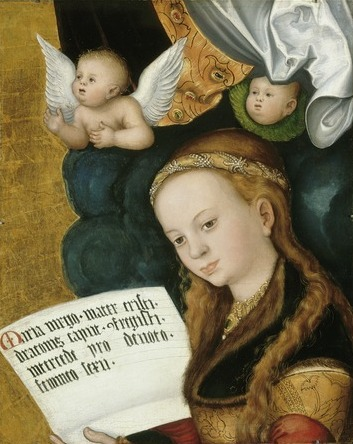
Prague Altarpiece: St Margaret, Staatsgalerie im Schloss Johannisburg

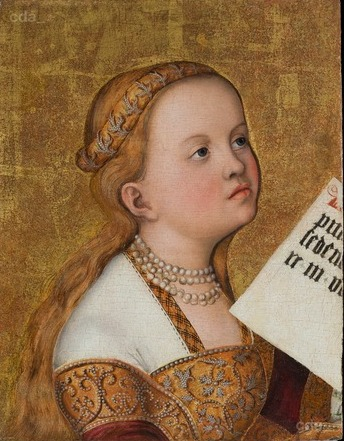
Prague Altarpiece: St Apollonia, private collection

This panel altarpiece, whose overall height was 220–230 cm and width circa 370 cm, was most probably three-winged with two hinged wings. Alternatively, it could have been made up of a single panel that was divided up later on, in the late 16th century. At that time, the altarpiece was evidently moved to a different place and the rear side of the wings, decorated with plant ornaments and marbling, was painted over with a scene of the Annunciation to the Virgin Mary.

Historians have attempted to reconstruct the original appearance of the altarpiece out of five surviving fragments and incomplete accounts from that period. With regard to the chapel's consecration, the Celebration of the Virgin Mary would have probably formed the centre of the altarpiece. The Madonna and Child, enthroned on a cloud, were surrounded by eight standing and seated female saints (from the left): St Apollonia, St Agnes of Rome, St Dorothea, St Catherine, St Barbara, St Margaret, St Christina of Bolsena and St Ursula.

The execution of the painting is of high quality and the altarpiece can thus be considered the authentic work of Lucas Cranach the Elder. The Holy Virgins surrounding the Virgin Mary (called the Holy conversation or Madonna among the Female Saints) hold in their hands scrolls on which there are inscriptions of Marian Praises and prayers for intercession into which syllables of the female saints’ names or their attributes are incorporated. These texts could have been written by the humanist Johannes Cuspinian, who orchestrated the Vienna marriage alliance. The ‘Queen of Heaven’ is mentioned in the text that St Catherine is holding. The Madonna was portrayed in a golden mandorla, surrounded by clouds with cherubs and two angels bearing her crown. The splendour and precious quality of the painting is accentuated by the perfect rendition of the period costumes’ materials in which the Holy Virgins are dressed – fur collars, velvet and brocade, fabrics whose hems are embroidered with gold and pearls, and rich gold jewellery with precious stones.

A carved early Renaissance altarpiece of 1509 in Mauer bei Melk, Germany, has a similar conception to the Prague Altarpiece. The German expert Hans Georg Thümmel made a reconstruction in drawing of the altarpiece, including the surviving fragments, that was used to present the Prague Altarpiece at the exhibition Europa Jagellonica in Kutná Hora in 2012. The Madonna was surrounded by three standing female saints on both sides and two kneeling figures in front. According to the description written in 1619 by the castle scribe Hübel, the altarpiece had a triangular stand as well.

== Surviving fragments of the altar ==
=== St Christina ===
A lime-wood panel measuring 72 x 50.5 cm; a fragment of the right-hand wing of the altarpiece. The picture shows kneeling St Christina without her usual attribute (a millstone most probably lay at her feet), however she is identified by the text on the sheet of paper in her hands. On the left there is the small head of an angel in a cloud and on the right there is part of a standing figure, most probably St Ursula. On the rear of the panel there is part of the figure of an angel from the Annunciation. The painting was in the collection of Prague Castle from 1619 to 1782, then from 1801 it was in the Götz collection, and between 1801 and 1922 it was loaned from the Nostitz collection to the Picture Gallery of the Society of Patriotic Friends of Art. Between 1934 and 1999 it was owned by Richard Morawetz. In 1999 the National Gallery in Prague purchased it from his heirs.

=== St Catherine and St Barbara ===
A lime-wood panel measuring 105.5 x 173.5 cm; a fragment of the central part of the altarpiece. The picture shows kneeling figures – on the left St Catherine, on the right St Barbara with a chalice and host. Behind St Catherine there is part of the figure of St Dorothea with a small basket of flowers, and behind St Barbara there is part of the figure of St Margaret with a dragon at her feet. Between them, there is the robe of the Virgin Mary with cherubs and a fragment of the gilded and punch-decorated background that framed the figure of the Madonna. The picture was part of the collection of Prague Castle until 1792, then it was loaned to the Picture Gallery of the Society of Patriotic Friends of Art, from where it was transferred to the collection of the National Gallery in Prague. In 1992 it was returned to the Picture Gallery of Prague Castle.

=== Female Saint, St Agnes of Rome? ===
A lime-wood panel measuring 55.5 x 43 cm; a fragment of the left-hand part of the altarpiece. The picture shows kneeling female saints; judging by the text in her hand, it is most probably St Agnes. This picture came from the collection of Prague Castle into the ownership of the Dukes of Saxe-Lauenburg and from there into the collection of Margravine Sibylle Auguste of Baden-Baden (1691). In the 18th century it was at Schloss Rastatt (inventory of 1722) and it is now in the collection of the Staatliche Kunsthalle Karlsruhe.

=== St Margaret ===
A lime-wood panel measuring 53.4 x 42.5 cm; a fragment of the central part of the altar. St Margaret is portrayed as a young girl with long wavy hair and a headband. Behind her, there is part of Mary's cloak with cherubs and a gilded background with punched decoration.

Sometime before 1810, the picture came into the collection of the Staatsgalerie im Schloss Johannisburg, Aschaffenburg.

=== St Apollonia? ===
A fragment with the figure of a female saint St Apollonia? is in the private collection of Jan Wittmann and Kertin Otto, Munich.

== The history of the altarpiece ==
According to Vincenc Kramář, the altarpiece was made in 1515 in connection with the engagement between Ferdinand I and Anna Jagiellon. According to other historians, it could have been commissioned for the coronation of Mary of Habsburg as Queen of Bohemia in 1522. K. Chamonikola concludes that Emperor Maximilian I had the retable painted to represent the House of Habsburg, whose members were portrayed in the form of female saints in the manner of the ‘sacred identification portrait’. The commission for this costly and demanding work was, in any case, connected in some way with the royal family and was, with its timing, linked to the accession of Louis II of Hungary and his wife Mary of Habsburg to the Bohemian throne.

The altarpiece was designed for the mansioners’ Choir of the Virgin Mary at the end of the cathedral, a place originally intended by Charles IV to be the site where the royal tomb would be built. In this place the altarpiece luckily escaped the great fire, described by the chronicler Wenceslaus Hajek, that broke out in the cathedral in 1541. The fire destroyed the roof and most of the interior furnishings, including the high altar, however it left several chapels in ambulatory of the cathedral untouched. The altarpiece might have been moved from the Chapel of the Virgin Mary and its panels divided up into a central part and two hinged wings during the reconstruction of the cathedral and in connection with the building of the Habsburg mausoleum. At the coronation of Matthias of Austria in 1611, the altarpiece is recorded in an engraving as being in the Marian Choir, the place where it was originally meant to be situated.

Accounts of the destruction of the altarpiece are well documented in historical sources. Shortly before his coronation, Frederick V of the Palatinate ordered St Vitus Cathedral to be cleared of the Catholic paintings and sculptures to which Calvinists objected. Between 21 and 23 December 1619, most of the cathedral’s religious objects fell victim to Calvinist iconoclasm. Several of the most valuable works, including Cranach’s altarpiece, were originally authorised by Frederick V of the Palatinate to be moved to the Sacristy and Chapel of St Sigismund. They were moved there by the painter Hans von Felz, and as the king’s mediator he offered to purchase the altarpiece for 500 thalers. On 22 December the court preacher Abraham Scultetus gave a sermon in St Vitus Cathedral ‘On idolatrous images’.

Under Scultetus’s guidance and aided by the Moravian Church and Unity of the Brethren professing allegiance to Calvinism, a radical purge ensued during which Cranach's altarpiece also fell victim. According to Jakob Hüebl, the construction scribe of Prague Castle, on 27 December and most probably at the command of the king, the priest Friedrich Salmuth was sent to St Vitus Cathedral along with a carpenter who, at least, cut out the panels with the female saints. One reason for this could have been that the face of one of the saints was also the portrait of the emperor’s own daughter.

The panels with the figures of the female saints were stored in the castle collection and were mentioned in inventories undertaken in 1621, 1648, 1650 and later on as well. A total of seven panels were documented, which corresponds to the number of all eight saints – on one panel, which is now in the collection of Prague Castle, there are two kneeling figures together. Of these, five have survived in Prague Castle’s collection and two panels portraying St Dorothy and St Ursula remain unaccounted for.

== Sources ==
- Jiří Fajt, Europa Jagellonica 1386 - 1572—Průvodce výstavou, Galerie Středočeského kraje v Kutné Hoře, ISBN 9788070561720
- Hamsíková Magdalena, Recepce díla Lucase Cranacha st. v malířství první poloviny 16. století v Čechách, dissertation, FF UK Praha, 2011
- Michal Šroněk, Kateřina Horníčková, Cranachův oltář v katedrále sv. Víta - jeho vznik a zánik, Umění / Art no. 1, 2010, pp. 2–16 (Studie v rámci výzkumného projetu Obrazy jako nástroje katolické konfesijní polemiky v českých zemích v období 1550–1650, financovaného Grantovou agenturou AV ČR, grantové číslo IAA800330902)
- Kateřina Horníčková, Michal Šroněk, (eds.), Umění české reformace (1380–1620), Academia Praha 2010, ISBN 978-80-200-1879-3
- Michal Šroněk, Kateřina Horníčková, Der Cranach-Altar im Veitsdom - seine Entstehung und sein Untergang, Umění/Art 1, 2010, pp. 2–16 Umění/Art, 1, 2010, on line
- Kaliopi Chamonikola, Lucas Cranach a české země. Pod znamením okřídleného hada / Lucas Cranach and the Czech Lands. Under the Sign of the Winged Serpent, (catalogue), Praha 2005, ISBN 978-80-86217-92-5
- Jiřina Hořejší, Jarmila Vacková, Některé aspekty jagellonského dvorského umění, Umění XXI, 1973, pp. 496–511
- Vincenc Kramář: Oltář Lukáše Cranacha v chrámu sv. Víta, in: Národní listy 1939, supplement no. 186.
