= Obříství =

- Municipality
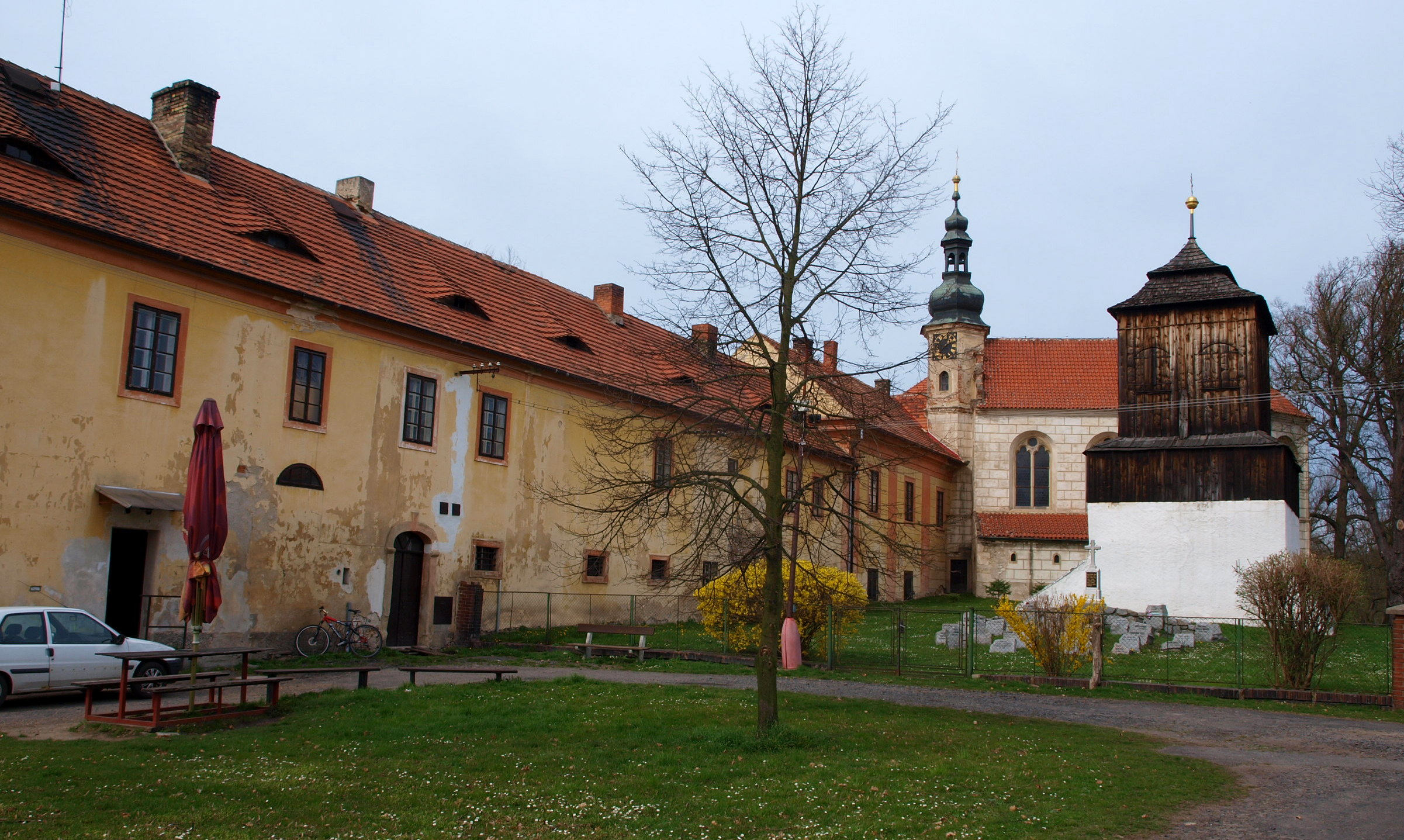
- Obříství Castle and the bell tower

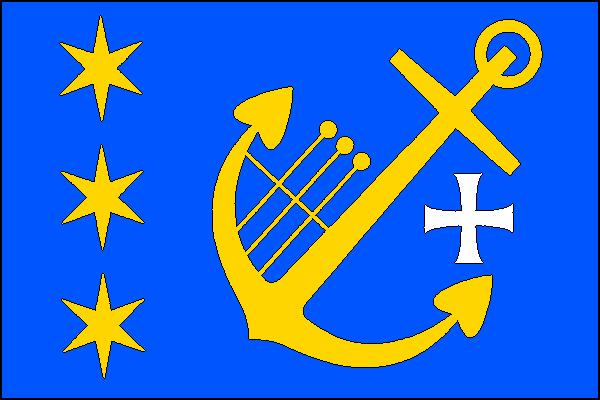
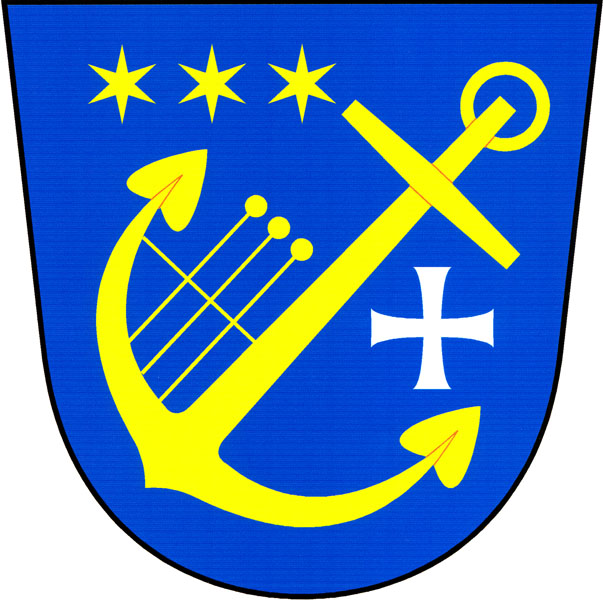
- Flag Coat of arms

- Location in the Czech Republic
- Coordinates: 50°17′45″N 14°28′42″E
- Country: Czech Republic
- Region: Central Bohemian
- District: Mělník
- First mentioned: 1290

Area
  - Total: 15.17 km^{2} (5.86 sq mi)
- Elevation: 165 m (541 ft)

Population (2026-01-01)
  - Total: 1,689
  - Density: 111.3/km^{2} (288.4/sq mi)
- Time zone: UTC+1 (CET)
  - Summer (DST): UTC+2 (CEST)
- Postal code: 277 42
- Website: www.obristvi.cz

Obříství is a municipality and village in Mělník District in the Central Bohemian Region of the Czech Republic. It has about 1,700 inhabitants.

== Administrative division ==
Obříství consists of three municipal parts (in brackets population according to the 2021 census):

- Obříství (1,081)
- Dušníky (408)
- Semilkovice (78)

== Etymology ==
The name Obříství is derived from the Old Czech word břístie, meaning 'ford'. The prefix o- means 'around'.

== Geography ==
Obříství is located about 6 kilometres (4 mi) south of Mělník and 19 km (12 mi) north of Prague. It lies in a flat landscape in the Central Elbe Table. The municipality is situated on the left bank of the Elbe River. The Vltava River forms the northern municipal border and the confluence of the Elbe and Vltava is located just outside the municipality.

== History ==
The first written mention of Obříství is from 1290. Before 1420, the village was acquired by Mikuláš Chudý, the founder of the Lobkowicz family. The family owned Obříství until 1542. After the village changed hands several times, in 1618 it was bought by the knight Václav Pětipeský, but his properties were confiscated after the Battle of White Mountain, and in 1623 Obříství was bought by Polyxena of Lobkowicz. In 1623, Obříství was described as a market town, but during the Thirty Years' War it was badly damaged and became a village again. In 1654, the village was sold and often changed hands again.

The municipality was heavily damaged by the 2002 European floods.

== Demographics ==
Historical population

Year	Pop.	±%
1869	1,029	—
1880	1,068	+3.8%
1890	1,112	+4.1%
1900	1,180	+6.1%
1910	1,225	+3.8%

Year	Pop.	±%
1921	1,083	−11.6%
1930	1,227	+13.3%
1950	1,064	−13.3%
1961	1,114	+4.7%
1970	1,028	−7.7%

Year	Pop.	±%
1980	953	−7.3%
1991	917	−3.8%
2001	915	−0.2%
2011	1,219	+33.2%
2021	1,567	+28.5%

Source: Censuses

== Transport ==
The railway line Kralupy nad Vltavou–Neratovice briefly crosses the municipal territory in the south, but there is no train station.

== Sights ==
The main landmarks are the Obříství Castle and the Church of the Nativity of Saint John the Baptist next to the castle. The church is a Gothic building from the 14th century, first mentioned in 1384. Next to the church is a separate Renaissance wooden bell tower. The castle was built on the site of the old fortress in the late Neoclassical style in 1824–1826.

== Notable people ==
- Bedřich Smetana (1824–1884), composer; lived and married here
- Svatopluk Čech (1846–1908), writer and poet; lived here in 1895–1903
