= Master of the Litoměřice Altarpiece =

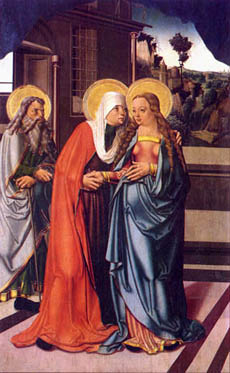
The Visitation (c. 1505–1510). Currently located at Strahov Monastery

The Master of the Litoměřice Altarpiece was a Bohemian painter active from the end of the 15th century to the beginning of the 16th. Active in the International Gothic style, he was one of the first practitioners of Renaissance art north of the Alps, and had a heavy influence on the future of the Danube school.

The Master appears to have been active in Prague, likely part of a group of artists who worked at the court between about 1495 and 1500. He may have worked for a time in the Austrian Lowlands and in Vienna after 1502, and have had contact with the work of Jorg Breu. His name comes from an altarpiece painted for Litoměřice between 1502 and 1505. After this period he seems to have gone to Venice, there encountering Vittore Carpaccio and his school. In 1506 he painted a portrait of Albrecht de Kolowrat; this is the first fully Renaissance male portrait known from Bohemia. Between 1506 and 1508 he completed the decoration and painted a fresco for the chapel of Saint Wenceslaus in St. Vitus Cathedral in Prague, in which he was again inspired by Renaissance models. Between 1505 and 1510 he painted a triptych for the Strahov Monastery; before the latter year he painted an altarpiece of Saint Andrew, a fragment of which still exists in Brno. He also completed another altar painting, this on a commission from Jan de Wartemberk, which today is in the National Gallery in Prague.

The Master is not believed to have worked at the Bohemian court after 1510; rather it is thought that he began to seek out a bourgeois clientele. He is known to have remained in Prague; between 1510 and 1515 he created an altarpiece for the church of Our Lady of Tyn in that city. He had a studio at some point; with his pupils, between 1515 and 1520, he painted an Altarpiece of the Trinity.

It is likely that the Master was trained in his craft in southern Germany.
