= Litoměřice Altarpiece =

Altar retable

The Litoměřice Altarpiece (Czech: Litoměřický oltář; 1505–1507) was a large altar retable, in all likelihood with two pairs of movable wings and two pairs of fixed ones. From these wings, six panels have survived, two of which are painted on both sides. The movable wings on the left-hand side of the altar are presumed lost. The altar wing depicting Christ on the Mount of Olives belongs to the Diocese of Litoměřice, while the other panels are owned by the Regional Museum in Litoměřice. It is the largest surviving set of panel paintings by an anonymous late Gothic and early Renaissance painter called the Master of the Litoměřice Altarpiece. The altarpiece is part of the permanent collection of the North Bohemian Gallery of Fine Art in Litoměřice.

Litoměřice Altarpiece, individual panels

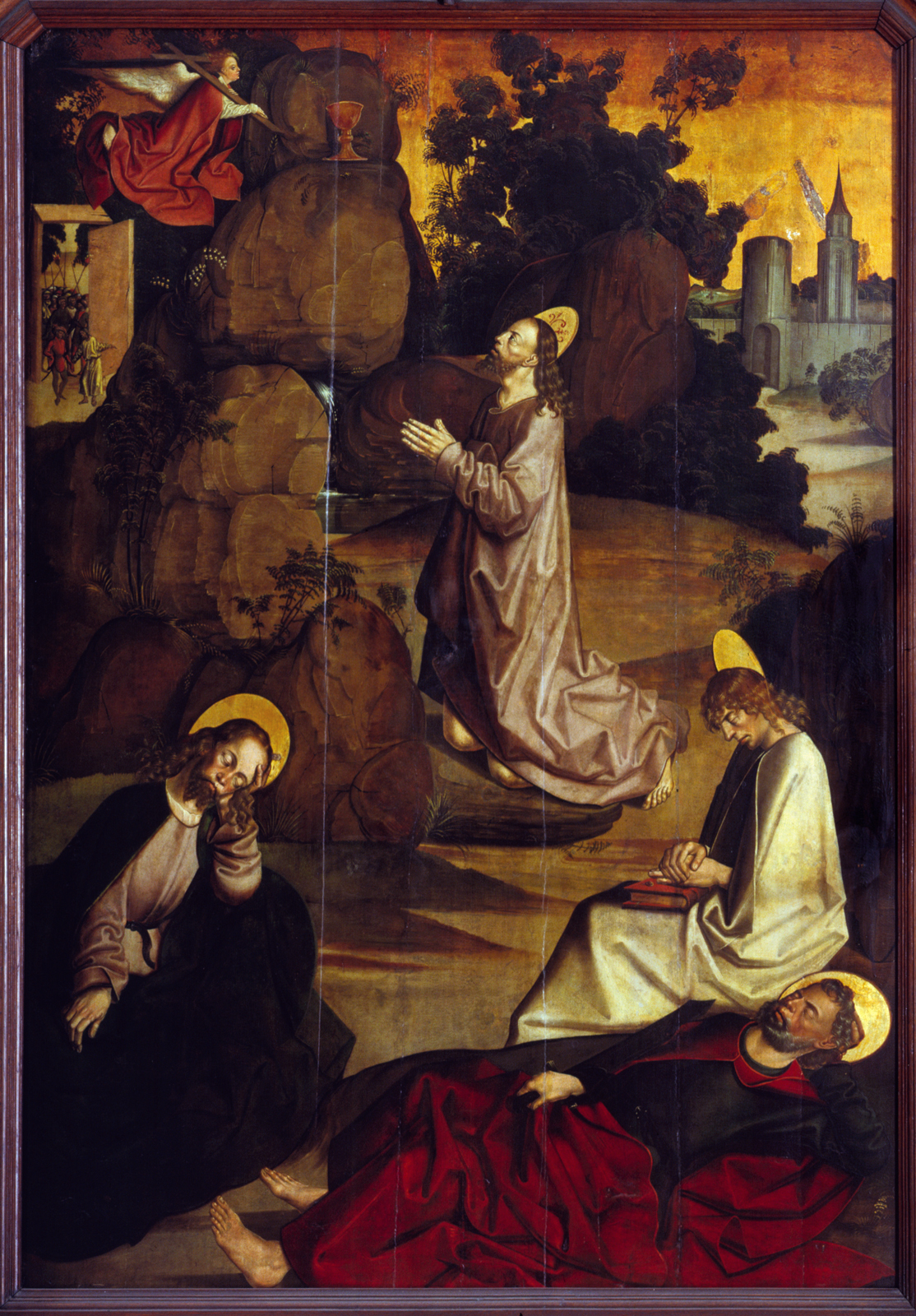
Christ on the Mount of Olives

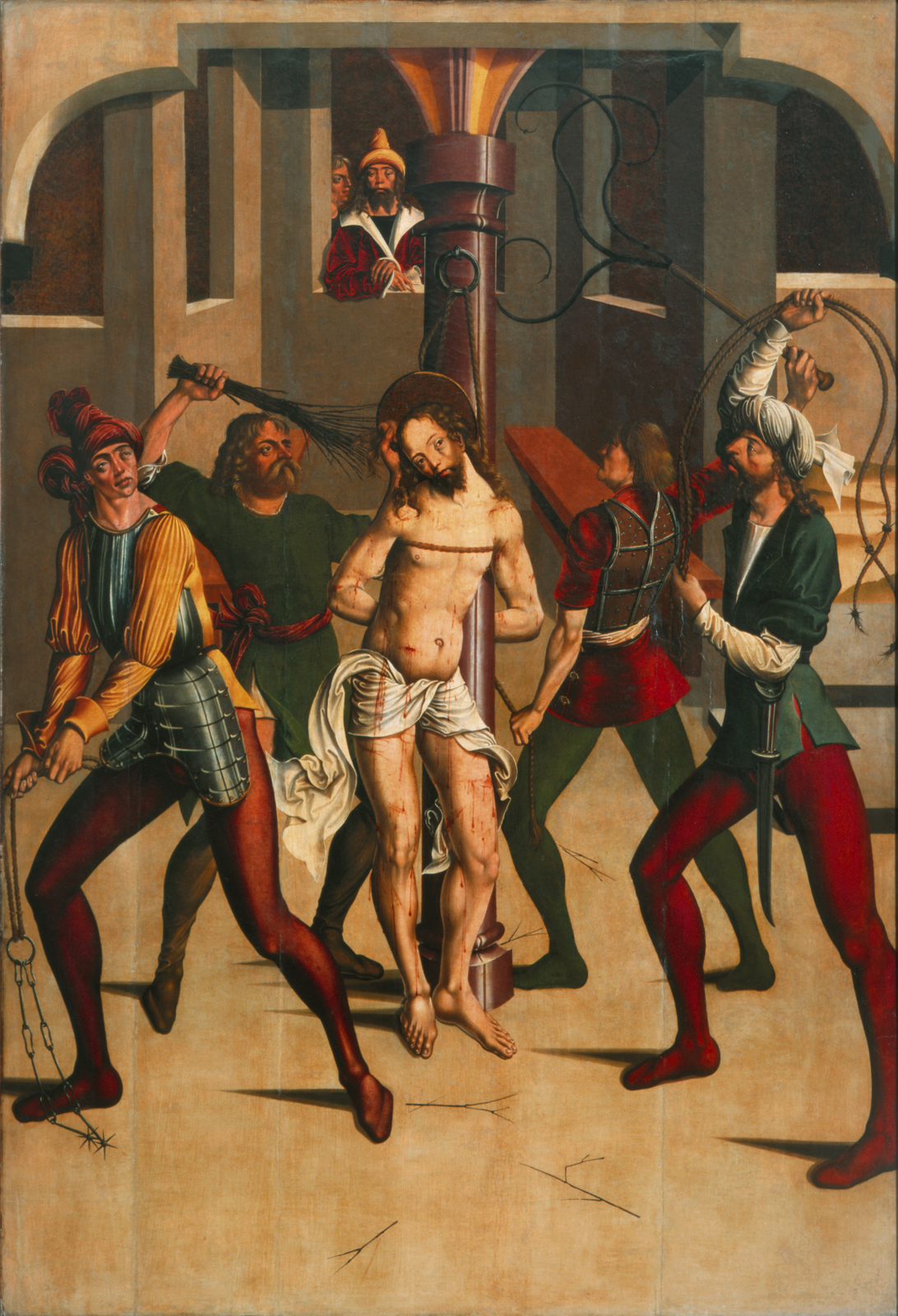
Flagellation of Christ

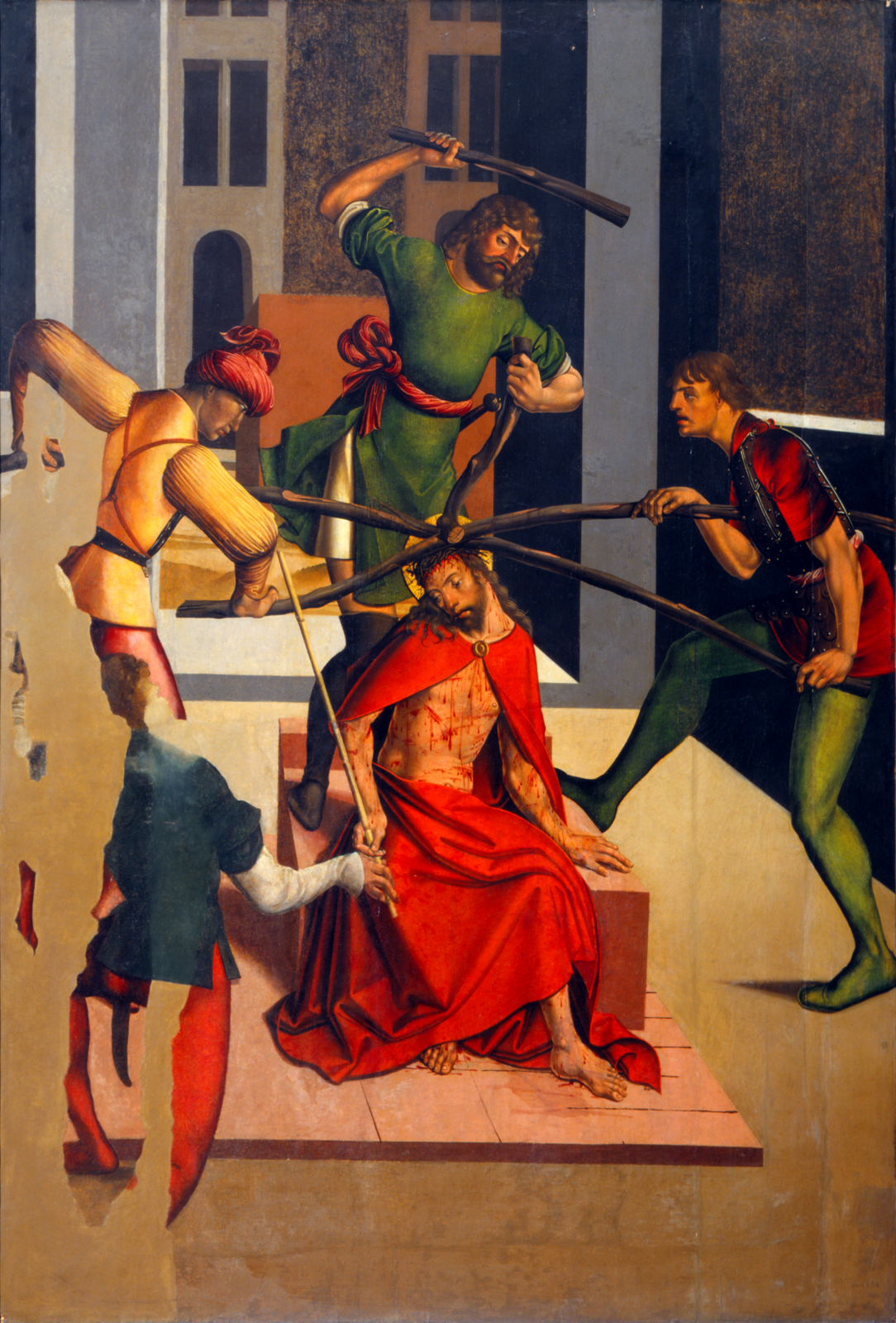
Crowning Christ with Thorns

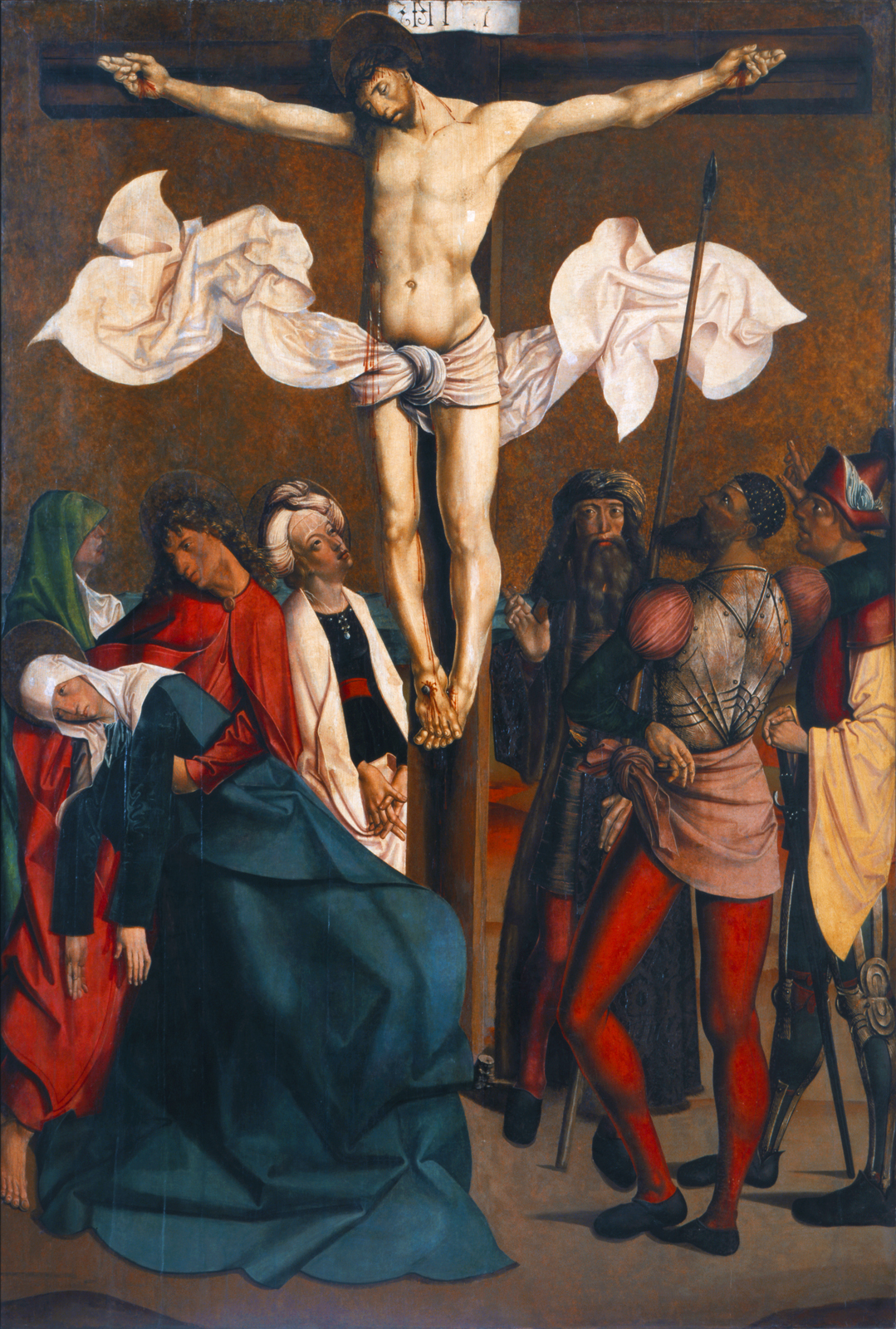
Crucifixion

Litoměřice Altarpiece, double-sided panels

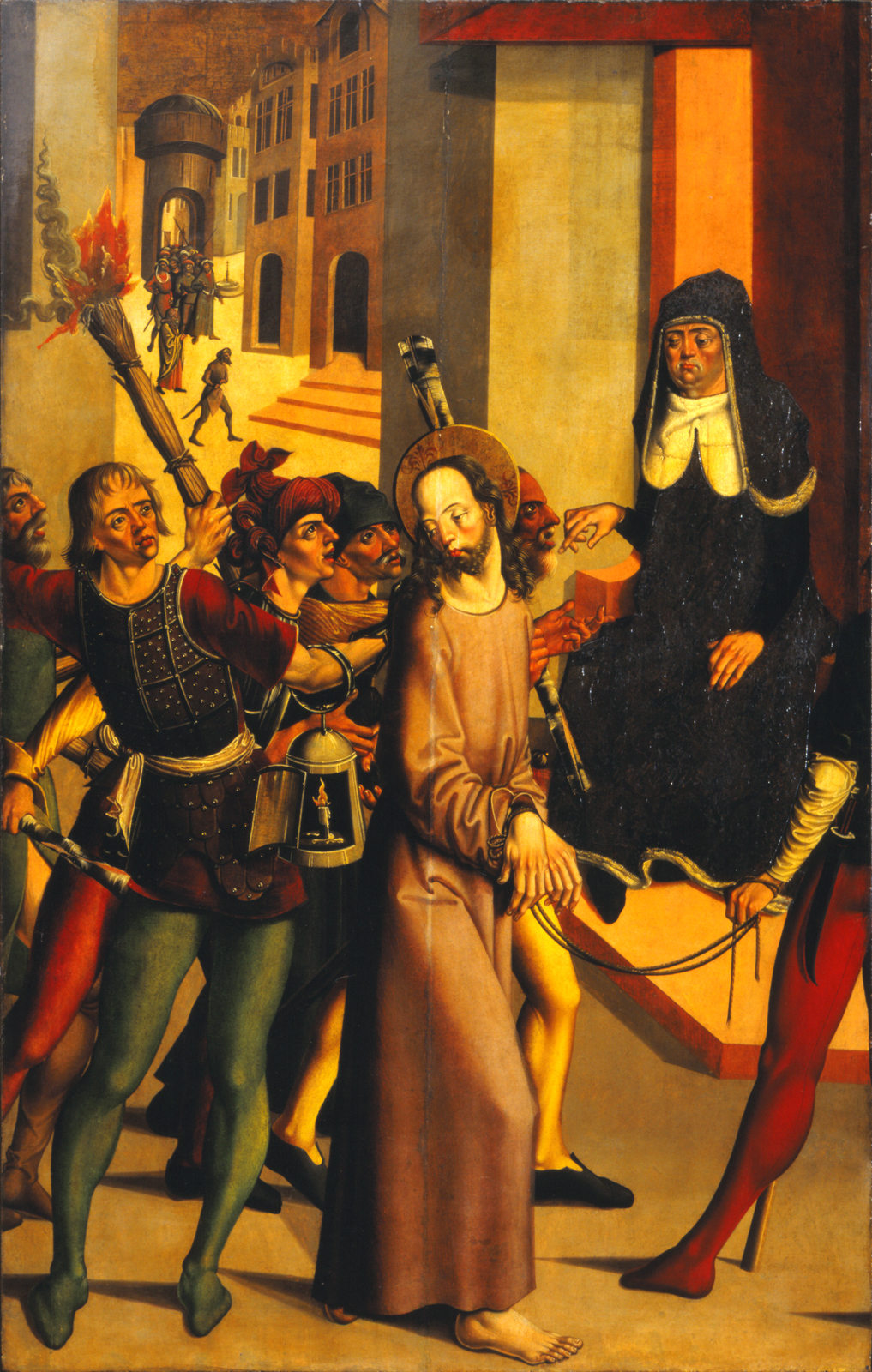
Christ before Annas

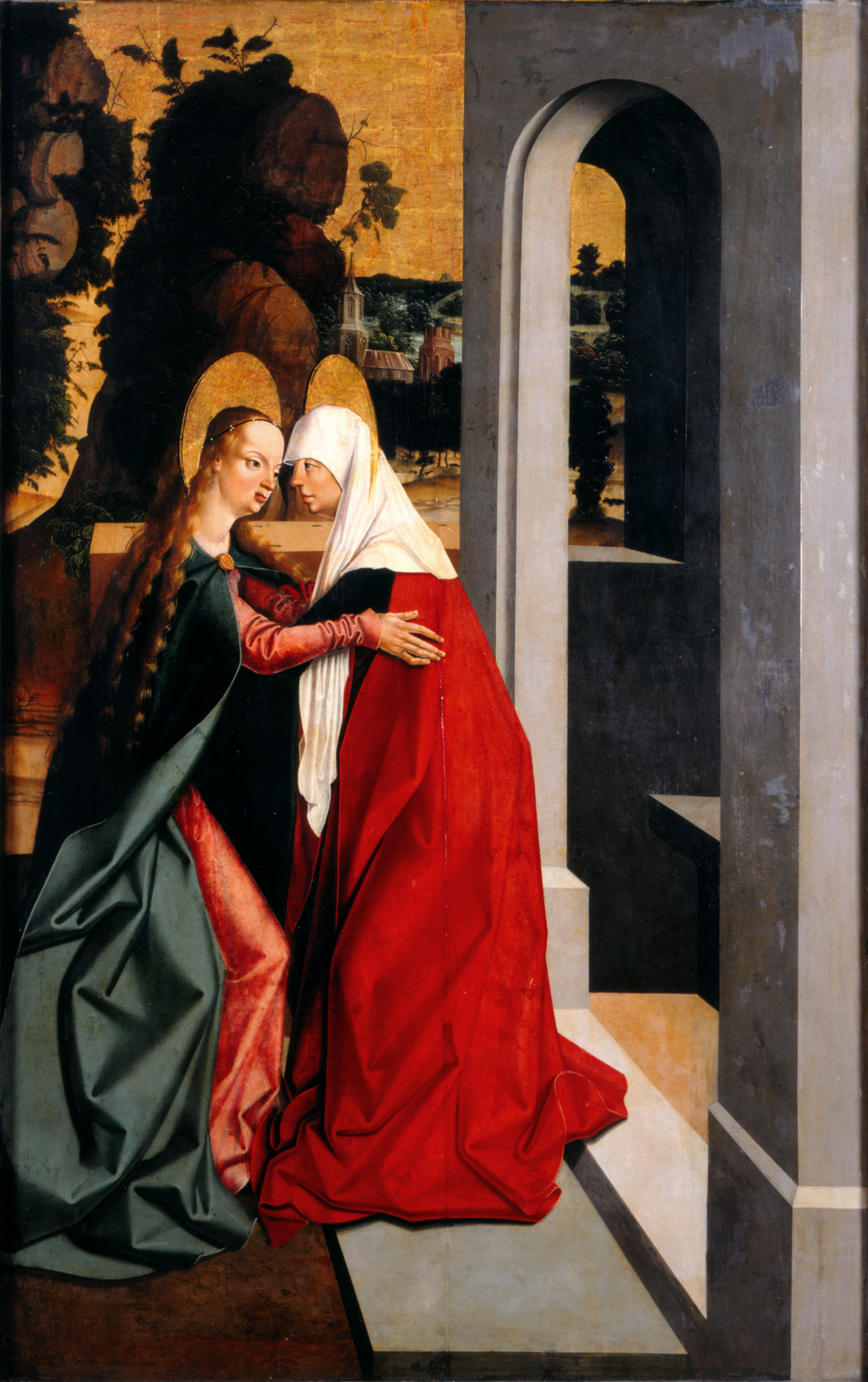
Visitation of the Virgin Mary

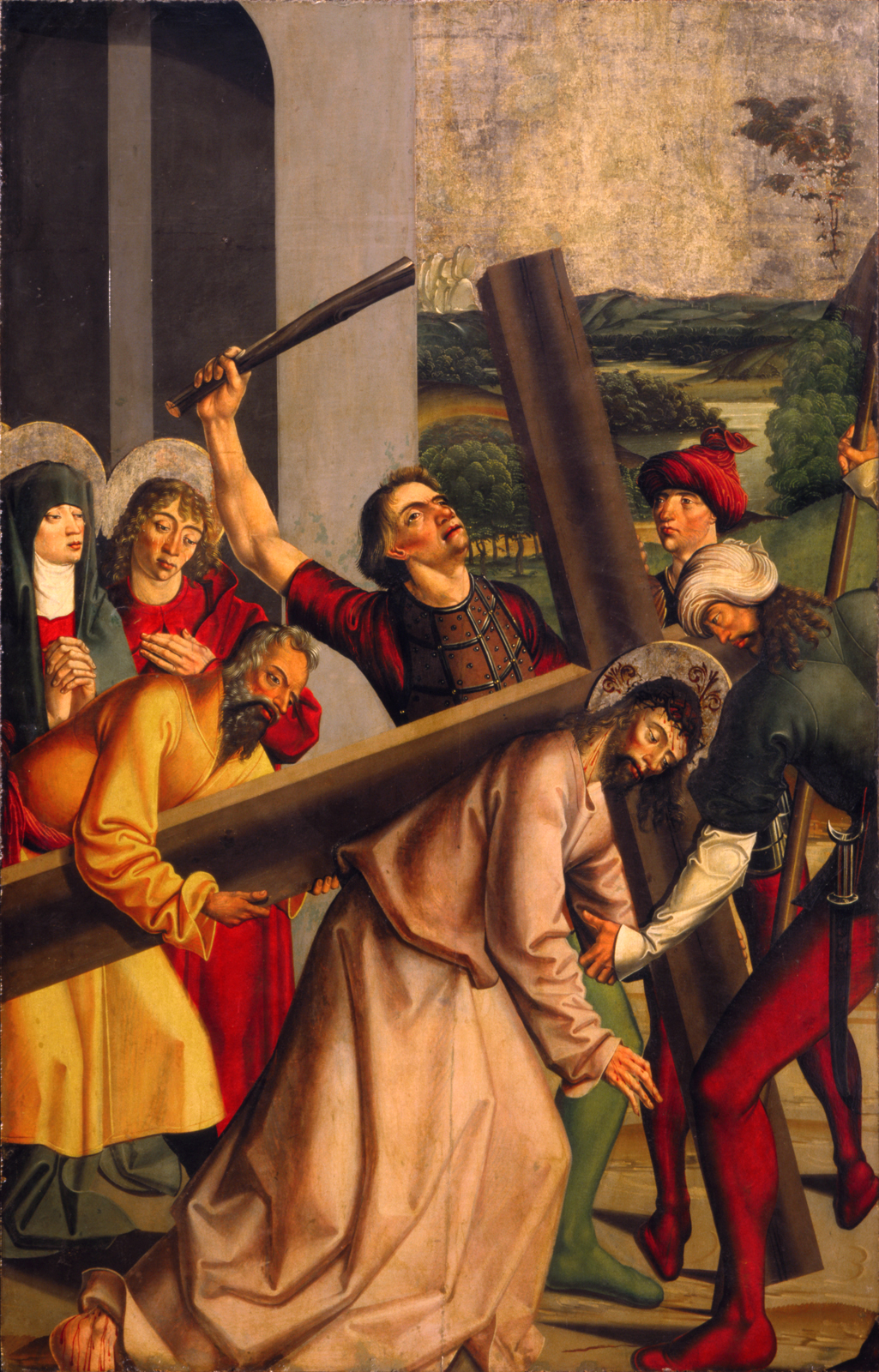
Christ Carrying the Cross

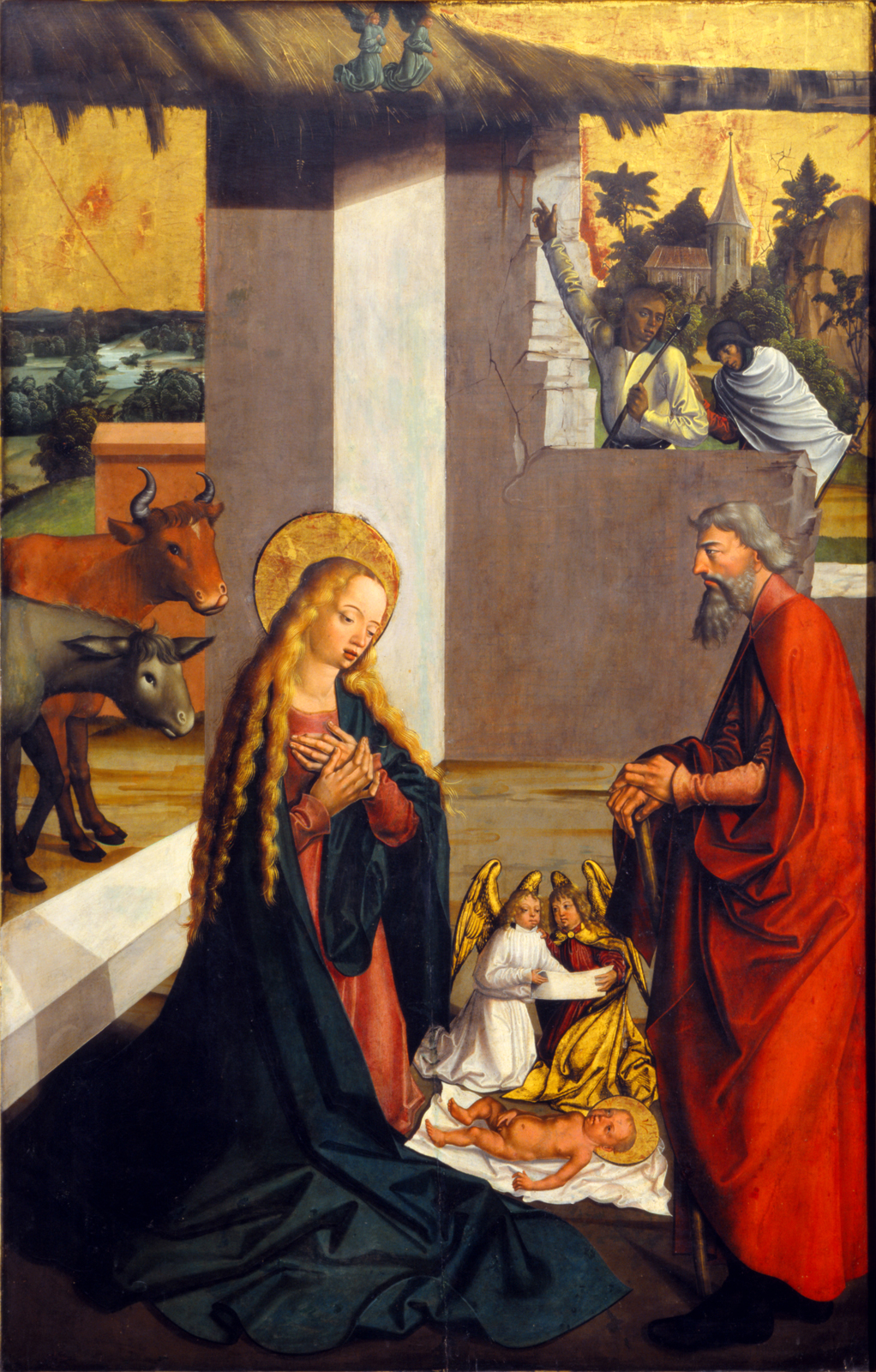
The Birth of Christ

== Reconstruction of the presumed appearance of the altarpiece ==
The first proposal as to how the altarpiece might have been arranged, one that didn't include the panel depicting Christ on the Mount of Olives, was made by Vincenc (Vinzenz) Luksch, the then director of the Diocese Museum, in 1900. He placed the Crucifixion in the middle of the altar; on both sides he placed two single-sided panels as fixed wings, the Flagellation of Christ on the left and the Crowning with Thorns on the right. These were connected on from by two double-sided panel paintings in the function of movable wings. He placed the painting of Christ before Caiaphas (Annas) on the left and Christ Carrying the Cross on the right. When the altarpiece was opened, it would show the Passion of Christ and, when closed, it would show scenes from the life of Mary: the Visitation of the Virgin Mary and the Birth of Christ. The overall width of the open altarpiece would be about 5.5 metres which is why Luksch considered that the panels might not have created an altarpiece but could, alternatively, have been individual Stations of the Cross.

The art historian Jaroslav Pešina attempted a different reconstruction of the altarpiece on the basis of a comparison with the altar retable from the castle chapel at Křivoklát. Pešina assumed that a receptacle with sculptural decoration formed the centre of the altarpiece that was most probably consecrated to the Virgin Mary. Placed in pairs above each other on both sides, the movable wings depicted not just the surviving scenes of the Visitation of the Virgin Mary and the Birth of Christ (right-hand side), but hypothetically also scenes showing the Annunciation to the Virgin Mary and the Sacrifice of Christ (left-hand side). The closed altarpiece showed eight scenes from the Passion of Christ in two rows, one above the other; of these, the surviving panels (from the left) are: Christ on the Mount of Olives and the Crowning of Christ with Thorns, Christ before Annas and Christ Carrying the Cross, the Flagellation of Christ and the Crucifixion.

The missing left-hand movable wings might have had scenes such as the Arrest of Christ and Christ before Pilate. This reconstruction is basically accepted by other art historians as well. Ladislav Kesner assumed that the altarpiece had a predella with the theme of Christ in the Winepress or else the Lamentation of Christ. Using comparisons with other altarpieces of the early 16th century, he proposed a variant arrangement of the missing parts. In the centre he assumed there to be a scene showing the Last Supper and, on the missing left-hand movable wings, the Annunciation and Flight to Egypt on the inner side and Ecce Homo instead of Christ before Pilate on the outer side.

== Description and classification ==
The altarpiece panels painted on one side that make up the fixed wings have dimensions of 177 x 121 cm (172 x 130 cm respectively). The movable wings painted on both sides have dimensions of 148 x 94 cm (147.5 x 96 cm respectively). The differing dimensions of the individual panels show that they were cut down to a smaller size subsequently. The altarpiece as a whole, including the lost middle part, the predella and the altarpiece attachment, could have thus measured (including the frames) about 6 metres in height and about 5 metres in width. The paintings are executed in tempera on fir wood. The most recent restoration, which repaired defects such as inappropriate restoration made in 1931 and 1945–46, took place between the 1950s and 1970s. Several panels were examined using infrared reflectography in 1998–1999. The resulting scans revealed two individual styles in the underdrawing.

Older art-historical publications detected in the panels of the Litoměřice Altarpiece the influence of Saxon painting and a relationship to the painting of Hanus Elfeldar, Bartholomäus Zeitblom, Hans Holbein the Elder and Bernhard Strigel. The painting style of the Master of the Litoměřice Altarpiece is based in the early Gothic, however it also employs certain elements of the early Renaissance. Its compositions are loosely modelled on the prints of the Master E.S., Israhel van Meckenem, Albrecht Dürer, Hans Schäufelein and Martin Schongauer which it creatively remodels. In order to create a deeper sense of space, it uses simple, diagonally constructed architectural backdrops with alternately illuminated and shaded areas depicted in empirical perspective. The contrast of the austere architecture with naturalist details points to the lesson of Italian Renaissance painting, either directly (Bellini) or indirectly (Michael Pacher). On the basis of differences in execution of how the figures are painted, and, assuming that the landscapes were painted by a specialist, Vladěna Haragová concludes that the altarpiece was created in a painting workshop where, as well as the Master of the Litoměřice Altarpiece, there worked at least two other painters. Pešina also states that several figures of the Passion series are characterised by a more common form of execution as well as by defects in the drawing, which points to the involvement of journeymen painters.

The figural component of the paintings is dominant and the construction of space is subordinated to it. The balanced composition of the individual paintings is reduced to several key protagonists and the accompanying action is presented on a diminished scale in the background. The painter's figures are successfully incorporated into the geometric backdrop of architectural elements. In terms of perspective, they are convincingly scaled in space. Their faces are concentrated and serious, with an expressive and well-differentiated physiognomy. They don't demonstrate their feelings in too ostentatious a way and reinforce the action with economical gestures of their arms and hands. The faces of the figures have sharp-chiselled features with pronounced cheekbones, high foreheads, full lips, expressive noses and eyes with swollen eyelids. Their large hands with striking joints are carefully modelled, including the small shadows they cast. Both the bared body of Christ and the figures portrayed in close-fitting clothes show how well the painter was acquainted with human anatomy and how he understood the function of the muscles and joints. Figures connected with Christ are portrayed in long flowing clothes, while his enemies are distinguished by contemporary Renaissance clothing.

The colour scale of the paintings is characterised by a wealth of shades, contrasts of cool and warm tones and a colourist inventiveness. The architectural backdrops are depicted in a limited range of illuminated monochrome areas and brownish or purplish shadows. The background is made up of dark-green vegetation, light areas of water, grey or brown stone architecture and brown cliffs. The clothes of the figures in the foreground use the contrast of rich colour tones ranging from vermillion red, sulphur yellow and an entire spectrum of greens to black and purple. The transitions in the colour areas are subtle, fluent and modelling volume. Light illuminates the given scene from a single source, usually from the top right. Its direction is represented by the lit areas of the architecture, the shading of draperies and faces, as well as by the striking triangular shadows on the floor.

The drapery of several of the figures still retains late Gothic decorative articulation with its deep or doubly-bent folds without direct connection to the volume of the body. Another Gothic element can be seen in the full halos, the gilded background and a certain disproportion in the depiction of part of the body. Most of the figures have legs that are too long, a short body and a small head. The deepening of the pictorial space with landscape sceneries is a significant innovation that the painter most probably brought back with him from a study trip to the Danube region, where he would have been able to acquaint himself with the works of Jörg Breu and Rueland Frueauf the Elder and Younger. A number of figural motifs link the Litoměřice Altarpiece with the Melk Altarpiece (1502) painted by Jörg Breu the Elder.[14] The painter's attention to detail, such as wrinkles, sprouting whiskers, knots in wood and coils of rope, are characteristic of the early Renaissance style of painting. The painter was well-acquainted with the qualities of various materials and displayed a well-developed knowledge of human anatomy.

=== Individual panels of the altarpiece ===
==== Christ on the Mount of Olives ====
The model for the composition is a loosely interpreted and left-right reversed copper engraving by Martin Schongauer. The praying Christ before the cliff with a Eucharist chalice and an angel create the uppermost tip of a triangular composition in whose foreground there lie and sit sleeping apostles. In the background there are depicted fortified walls and a city gate, most probably those of Jerusalem. On the left, in small detail, soldiers coming to arrest Jesus enter through the gate. Despite the fact that the entire altarpiece is a stylistically unified whole, the composition of this picture, its unifying of space and the masterly execution of the heads and hands, stands out with its quality from the other panels.

==== The Flagellation of Christ ====
The naked Christ, dressed merely in a loincloth, is tied to a pillar in the centre of a room. Four men torture him with a scourge and a birch cane. In the background, Pontius Pilate looks on. The light coming from the right-hand side is represented by the small triangular shadows of their legs that, along with fragments of the cane, articulate the area of the floor. The detail of the man with the cane originates in the engraving by Martin Schongauer.

==== Crowning Christ with Thorns ====
The tormented Christ, sitting on a stone seat, is partly covered by a red robe. Three bailiffs press a crown of thorns down on his head using long wooden poles. The fourth person in the spot where the painting is heavily damaged has his back turned to us and is giving Christ a bulrush as a sceptre. The figure of Christ has a spiral composition and the figures surrounding him are portrayed in contraposition, emphasising their movement. The space is deepened by diagonally depicted architectural elements and by the contrasts of illuminated and shaded areas. The scene is loosely inspired by a print by the Master E. S.

==== The Crucifixion ====
This monumental composition is dominated by the Crucified Christ with horizontally billowing tips of this robe. Christ's body is portrayed with a good knowledge of human anatomy. The painter devoted great care to portraying Christ's face and details of his hands. On the left-hand side, Mary Magdalene in white turban and another woman in a green maphorion are looking up at the cross. In the foreground of the composition, St John is supporting the Virgin Mary, who has fainted and whose arms hang limply. On the right-hand side stands Joseph of Arimathea in a rich fur-lined robe; St Longinus, whose spear is being held by Joseph; and a Roman centurion. The composition is loosely based on the prints of Albrecht Dürer (the Virgin Mary) and Hans Schäufelein (the centurion). The decorative rendering of Christ's robe with its billowing tips appears in late Gothic, for example in the work of Martin Schongauer and Lucas Cranach the Elder (1503).

=== Double-sided panels of the altarpiece ===
==== Christ before Annas / The Visitation of the Virgin Mary (double-sided panel) ====
In contrast to earlier interpretations stating that the picture portrayed Christ before Caiaphas, according to Jan Royt it is in fact the theme of Christ before Annas (according to St John's Gospel), because Caiaphas is usually shown in a robe torn at the chest or with a mitre (Giotto, Dürer). A group of armed men with torches has brought Christ, his hands tied, and turn to the enthroned high priest with gestures of their arms and hands. The panel is damaged, having been cut down to a smaller size; it is consequently missing most of the figure holding the rope. Christ looks back at a man holding a lamp with a burning candle – this man with a lamp is modelled on an engraving by Martin Schongauer. The men surrounding Christ are wearing short tunics and close-fitting leggings typical of Renaissance fashion in the early 16th century. Christ's long robe partially indicates the volume of his body. A view through to the street beyond shows a group of armed men in front of whom an old man, probably St Peter, is crossing.

In the scene of the Visitation, the colour contrast of the richly folded drapery of both figures and the white head-veil of St Elizabeth provide the dominant artistic element. Mary is portrayed in a headband and with long locks of curly hair. Beyond a low wall, a landscape enlivened with cliffs covered with trees and vegetation unfolds into distant space; beyond, we can see a church and a half-built tower under scaffolding. The slender and subtly modelled fingers of the Virgin Mary cast a shadow corresponding to light coming from the right-hand side. The composition is modelled on a print by the Master E.S.

==== Christ Carrying the Cross / The Birth of Christ (double-sided panel) ====
Christ, dragging on his shoulder a large T-shaped cross, is portrayed before the Gate of Jerusalem. The background features a landscape with a river and distant mountains; the lowered horizon deepens the space beyond. The sky is replaced by silver background. The man in yellow clothing helping Christ to carry the cross is Simon of Cyrene. In the foreground, a soldier with a spear is lifting up the flagging Christ while another man is about to hit Christ with a cudgel. Christ is accompanied by a praying Virgin Mary and a weeping John the Apostle who has a resigned expression on his face. This scene was modelled on prints by the Master E.S. and Martin Schongauer. Its composition has much in common with a later painting by an unknown master of the Danube School (c. 1520) that is in the collection of the Slovak National Gallery.

The Adoration of Christ takes place against the background of simple architecture beyond which there unfolds a landscape with a church, cliffs and a lake. The birth of Christ is set in a hut indicated merely by a thatched roof. On the left there stand a donkey and an ox looking on behind a low tumbled-down wall. The naked Baby Jesus lies on a white swaddling cloth and, behind him, two kneeling angels hold a blank inscription band. On the right there stands Saint Joseph, covered in a long red robe, with a serious expression on his face. Portrayed in profile, his head is disproportionately small compared with Mary as well as with the size of his own body. The lovely face of the Virgin Mary, similar to loving Madonnas, is different to the portrayal of Mary in other panels of the altarpiece. Two shepherds are approaching the hut, one of whom points to a pair of angels on the partial roof.

The depiction of Baby Jesus on the bare ground is a motif stemming from the Franciscan mysticism and refers to ‘the Vision of Saint Bridget of Sweden’. It became more widespread in the final third of the 14th century.

== Prints and painting ==
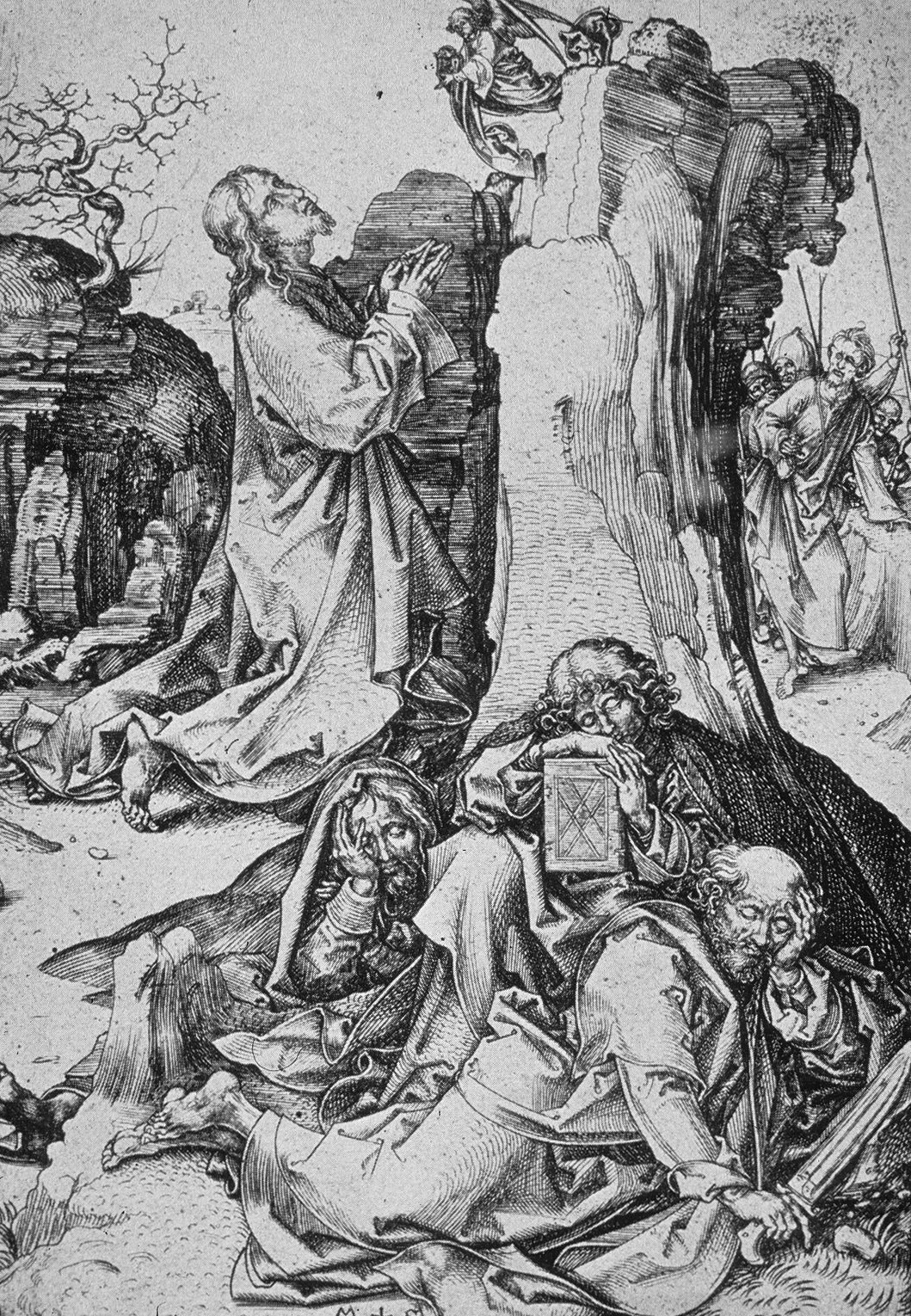
Martin Schongauer, Christ on the Mount of Olives

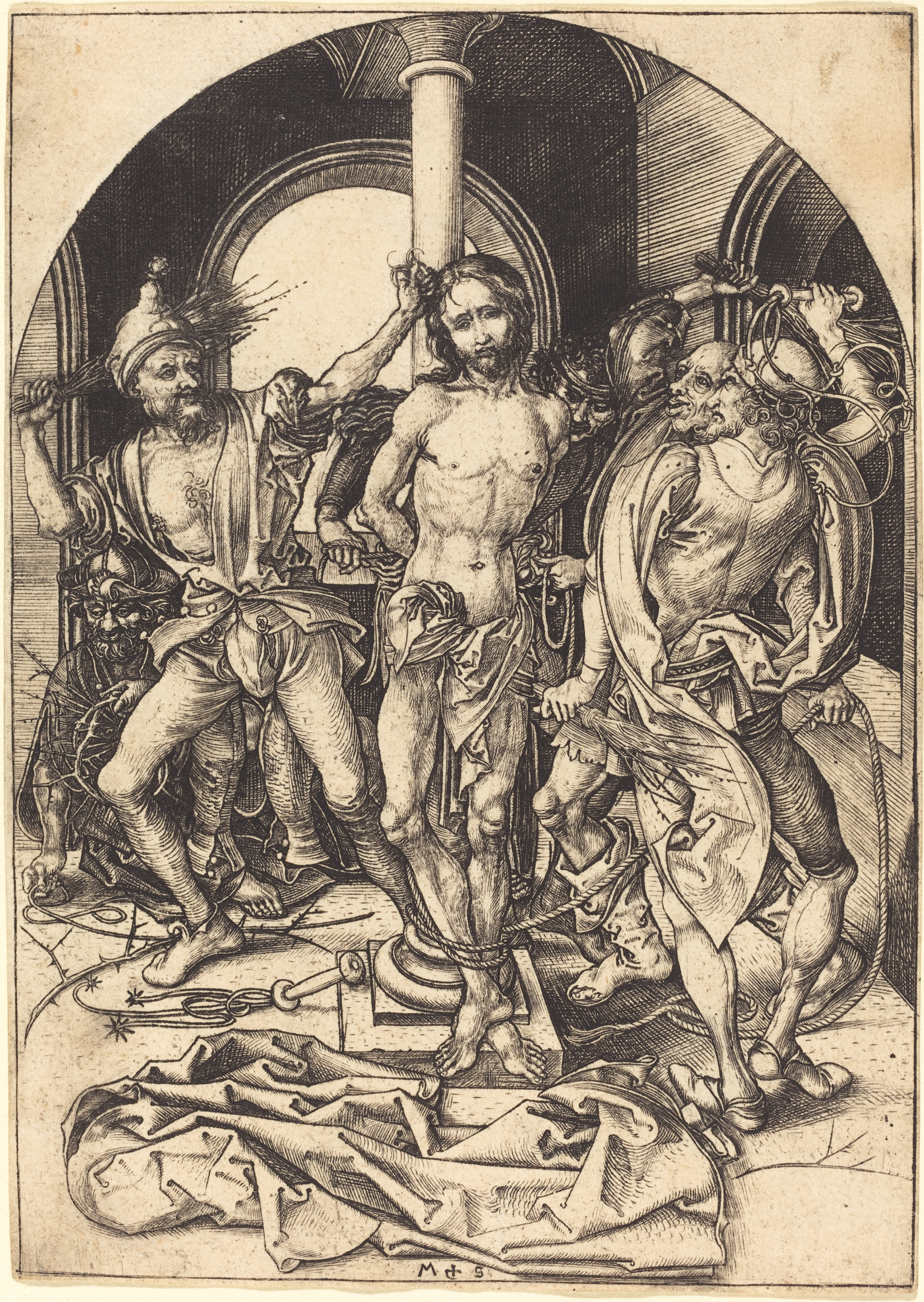
Martin Schongauer, Flagellation of Christ

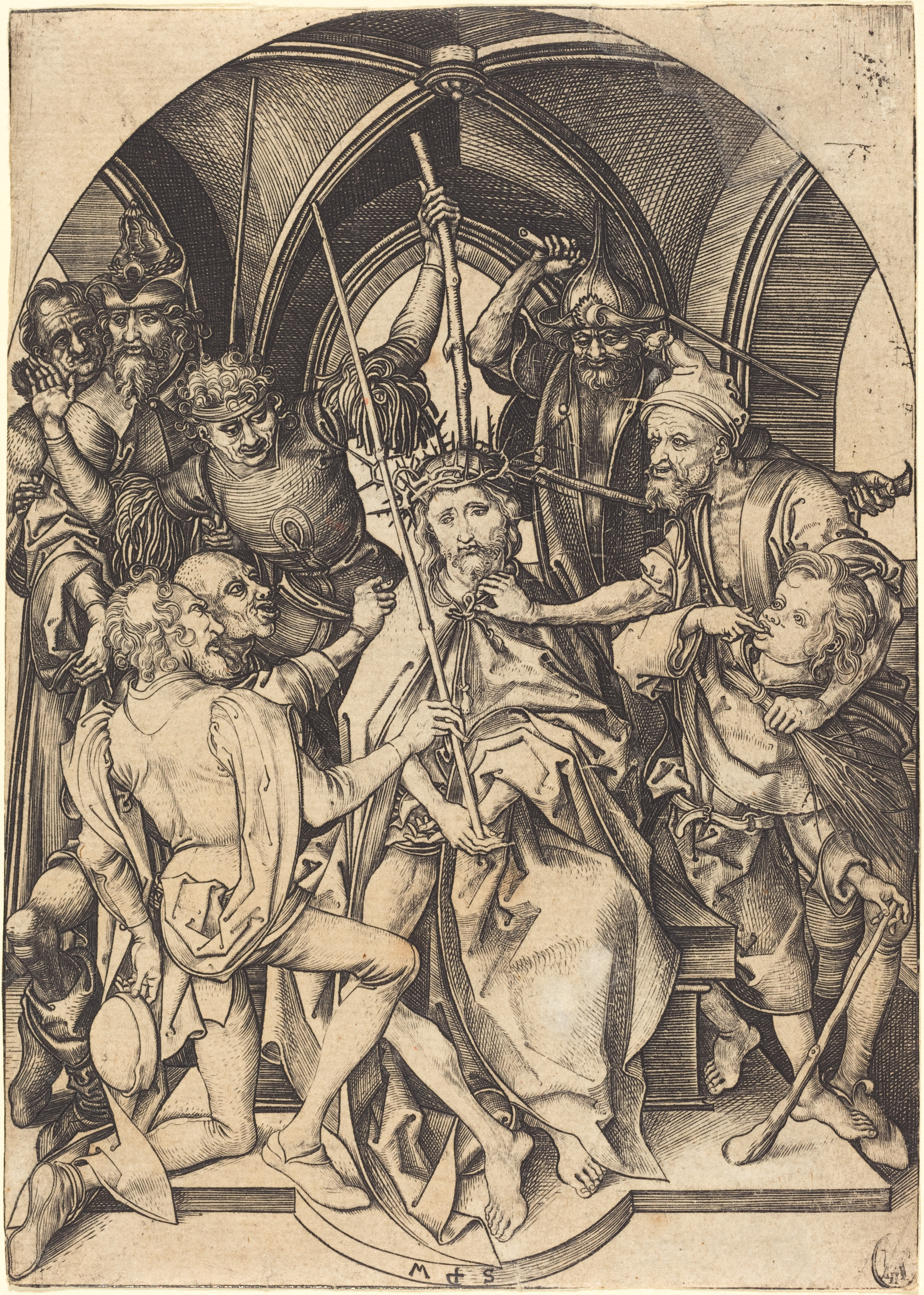
Martin Schongauer, Crowning Christ with Thorns

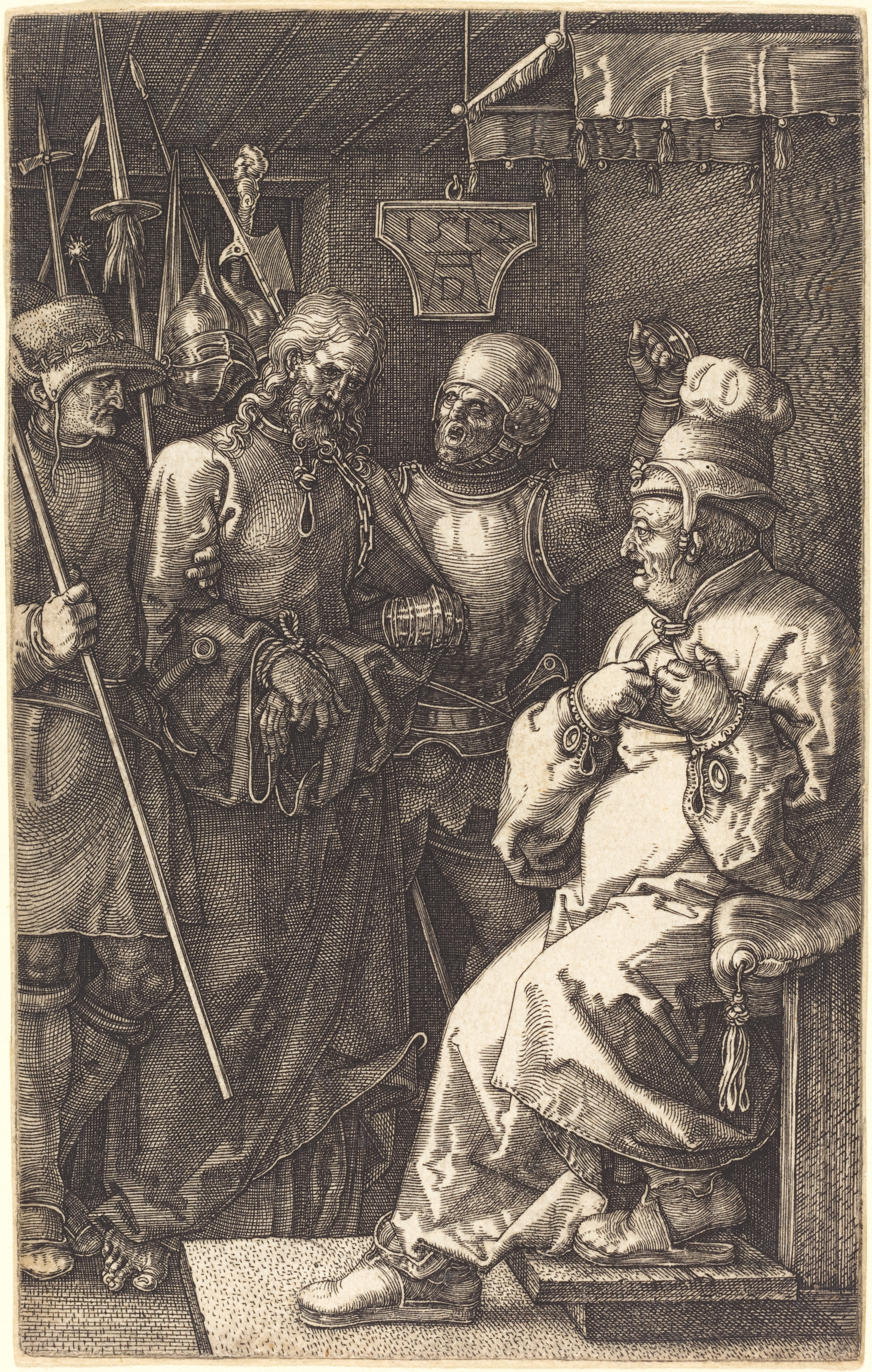
Albrecht Dürer, Christ before Caiaphas

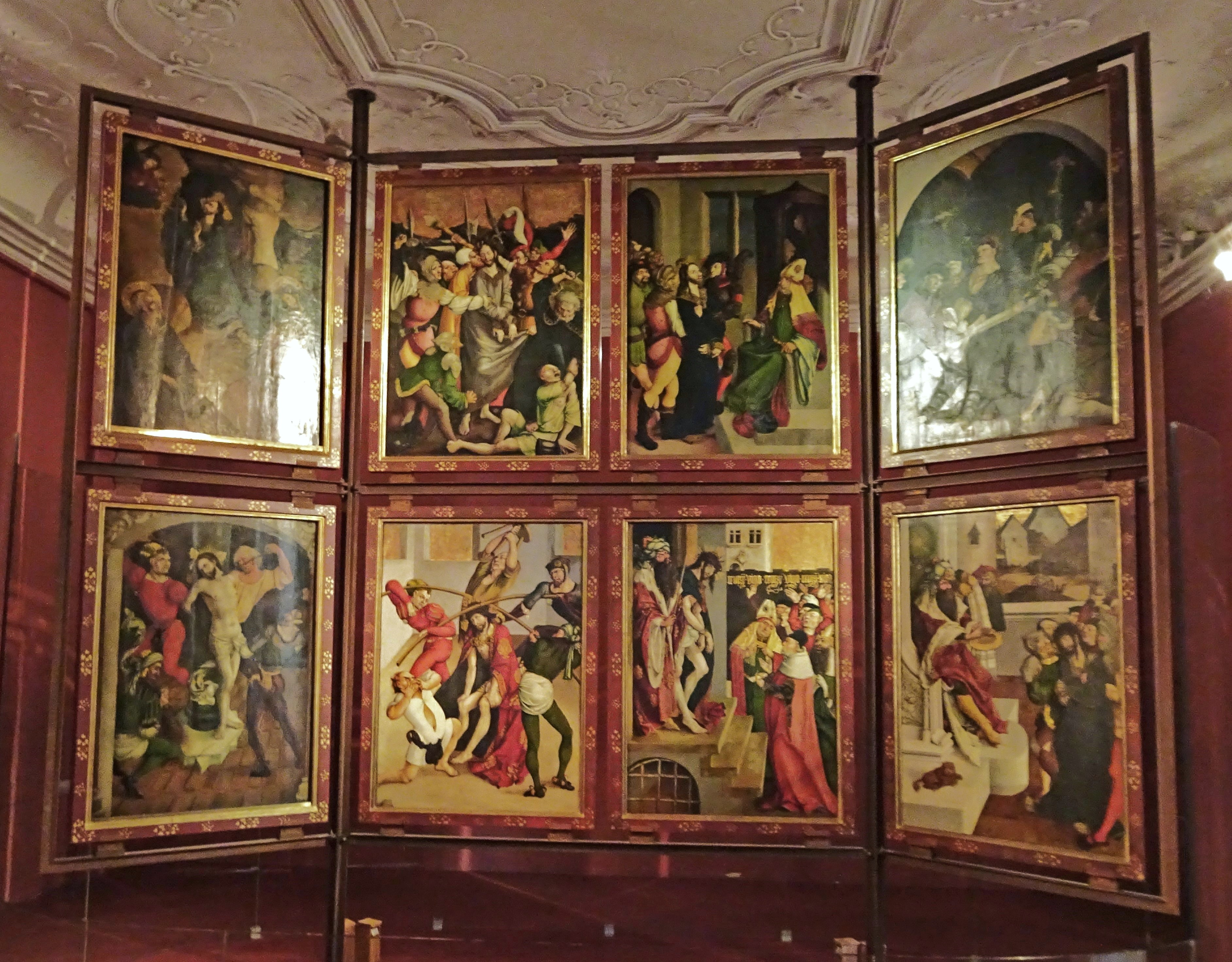
Jörg Breu the Elder, Melk altarpiece (1502)

== History of the altarpiece ==
There is no broad agreement among historians as to the original location of the altarpiece. It could have been commissioned for the capitular Cathedral of St Stephen in Litoměřice by Jan of Vartenberk, provost of the Chapter of St Vitus for whom the painter also made a votive picture (1508, known only from a later copy). Like the Master of the Křivoklát Altarpiece in whose workshop he trained, the Master of the Litoměřice Altarpiece also worked for the royal court. He made the wall paintings in the St Wenceslas Chapel of St Vitus Cathedral, which means that the altarpiece could have come from a Prague church. Among those worth considering are St Vitus Cathedral and the Premonstratensian Canonry at Strahov that commissioned an altar triptych from the artist. In addition to this, Herold, the first recorded donor of the altarpiece, maintained close ties with the Strahov Premonstratensians. According to documents quoted by Lippert in 1871, Jiří Vilém Herold of Stod, a citizen of Litoměřice and a royal magistrate, donated the panels to the diocese Church of All Saints in Litoměřice in 1633. The paintings were removed from the church in 1671 (1673) after a new high altar was installed there. In 1871 the paintings were located in the town council hall in Litoměřice. In 1885 Vinzenz Luksch purchased them from there for the collection of the Diocese Museum. In 1920 Luksch recognised that the painting of Christ on the Mount of Olives that had, until then, hung in the Church of All Saints, also belonged to the altarpiece.

== Sources ==
- Jan Royt, Gotické deskové malířství v severozápadních a severních Čechách, 1340–1550, 352 str., Karolinum Praha 2015, ISBN 9788024631745
- Aleš Mudra, Ad gloriam Dei: 130 let Diecézního muzea v Litoměřicích a 20 let jeho obnovené existence/ 130 years of the Diocese Museum in Litoměřice and 20 years of its revival, Litoměřice 2015
- Vladěna Haragová, The personality of Master of the Litoměřice Altar and his hypothetical activity in St. Wenceslas Chapel in St. Vitus Cathedral in Prague, bachelor's thesis, KTF a UDKU, Charles University in Prague 2009
- Royt Jan, Renovatio Regni. Zum Charakter der Kunst in Böhmen unter der Jagiellonen Wladislaw II. und Ludwig II. In: Popp Dietmar / Suckale Robert (ed.): Die Jagiellonen. Die Kunst und Kultur einer europäischen Dynastie an der Wende der Neuzeit, Nürnberg 2002, p. 227-232
- Chlumská, Štěpánka (ed.), Obrazy z Legendy o sv. Kateřině Alexandrijské. Mistr Litoměřického oltáře a jeho dílna, Národní galerie v Praze, Praha 1999, ISBN 80-7035-207-8
- Thomas DaCosta Kaufmann, Court, Cloister, and City: The Art and Culture of Central Europe, 1450–1800, University of Chicago Press, 1995, ISBN 978-0226427300
- Kesner, Ladislav, Poznámky k historii bádání o litoměřickém oltáři a jeho ikonografické podobě, in: Umění 1990, s. 305-311
- Kesner Ladislav, Mistr litoměřického oltáře. Katalog výstavy, Severočeská galerie, Litoměřice 1989, ISBN 80-85090-04-X
- Pešina Jaroslav, Deskové malířství, in: Pozdně gotické umění v Čechách, Odeon Praha 1984 (s. 346-361)
- Kesner Ladislav, Mistr litoměřického oltáře. Katalog výstavy, Národní galerie v Praze 1978
- Kesner Ladislav, Mistr Litoměřického oltáře. Národní galerie v Praze 1977
- Pešina Jaroslav, Mladá léta Litoměřického mistra, in: Umění 23, 1975, s. 453-462
- Pešina Jaroslav, Die Tafelmalerei am Jagellonenhof in Prag 1471 – 1526. In: Acta historiae artium Academiae Hungaricae XIX-XX. Budapest 1973-1974
- Pešina Jaroslav, Mistr litoměřický, Praha 1958
- Pešina Jaroslav: Tafelmalerei der Spätgotik und der Renaissance in Böhmen 1450–1550. Prag 1958
- Pešina Jaroslav, Česká malba pozdní gotiky a renesance, Praha 1950
- Pešina Jaroslav, Slohový vývoj Mistra litoměřického oltáře, in: Sborník k poctě šedesátých narozenin Antonína Matějčka, Praha 1949, s. 138
