= St Catherine Altarpiece (Master of the Litoměřice Altarpiece) =

Altarpiece ascribed to the workshop of the Master of the Litoměřice Altarpiece

The St Catherine Altarpiece (an altarpiece with pictures of the legend of St Catherine of Alexandria) is a set of panel paintings from the period around 1515 that is ascribed to the workshop of the Master of the Litoměřice Altarpiece. A total of six panel paintings survive from the original retable: one wing painted on both sides and two panels painted on one side in the collection of the National Gallery in Prague and two panels in the private collection of G. Schäfer (Schweinfurt).

St Catherine Altarpiece, workshop of the Master of the Litoměřice Altarpiece

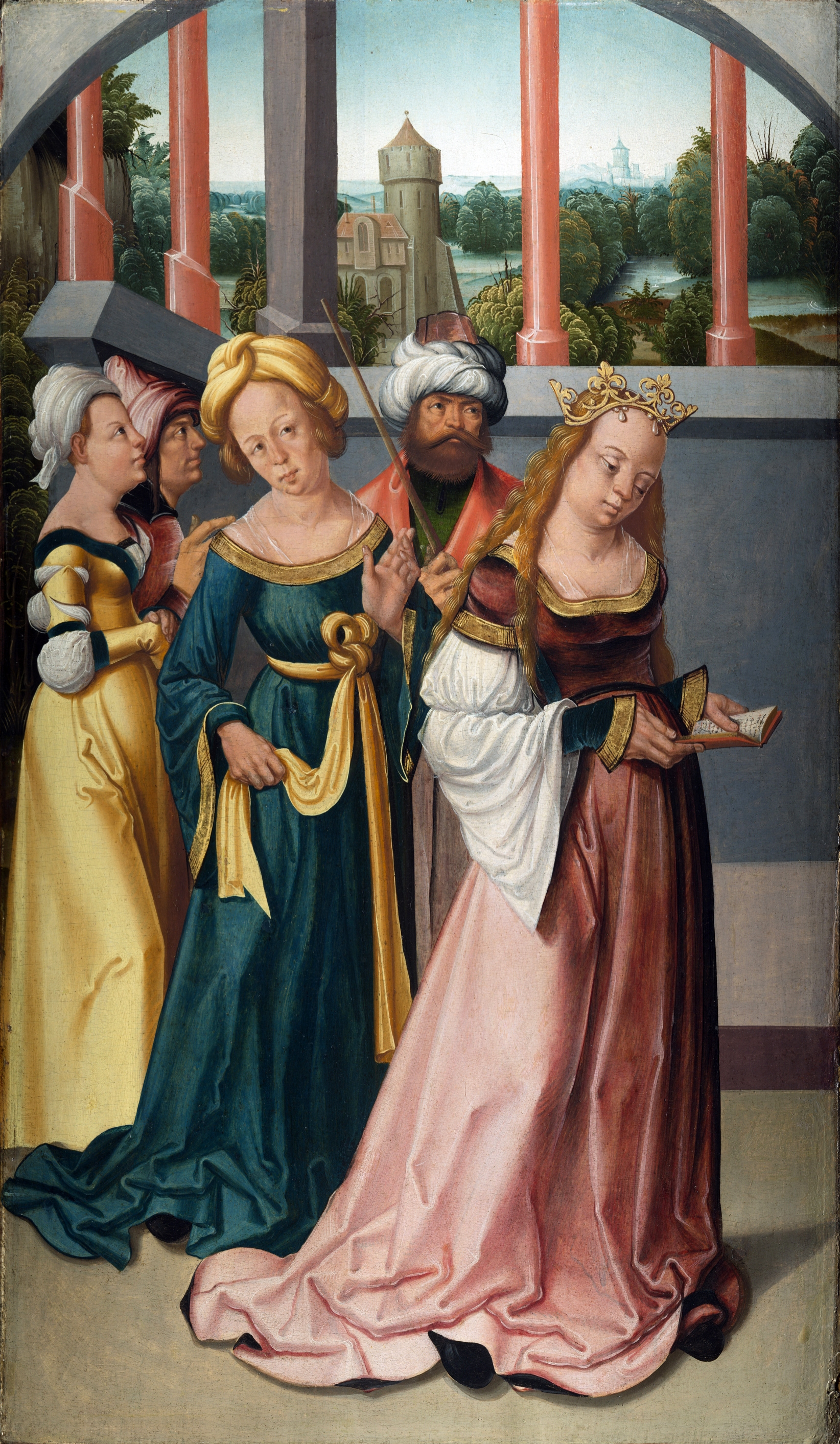
St Catherine Reading

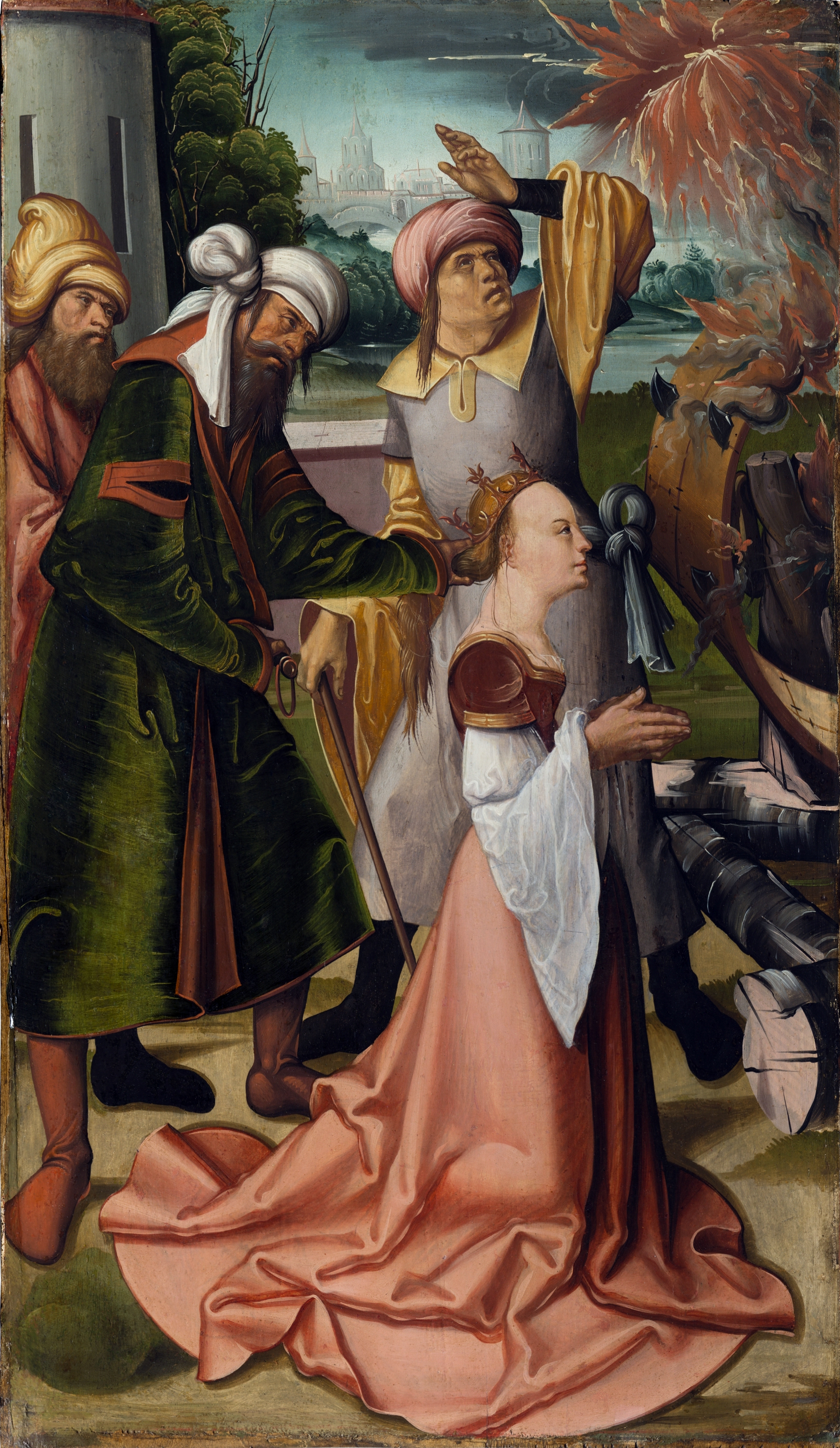
The Martyrdom of St Catherine

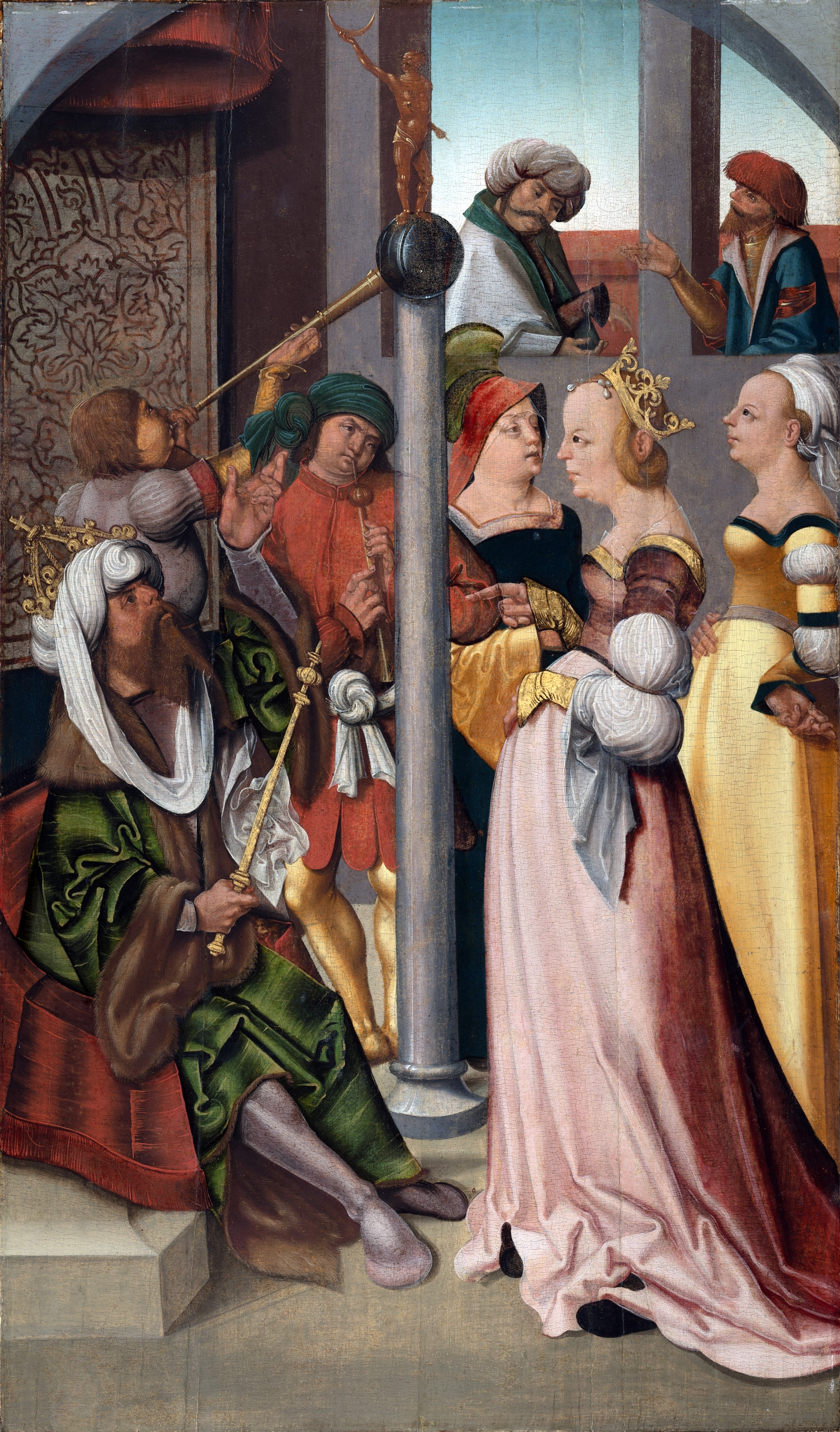
St Catherine before Emperor Maxentius

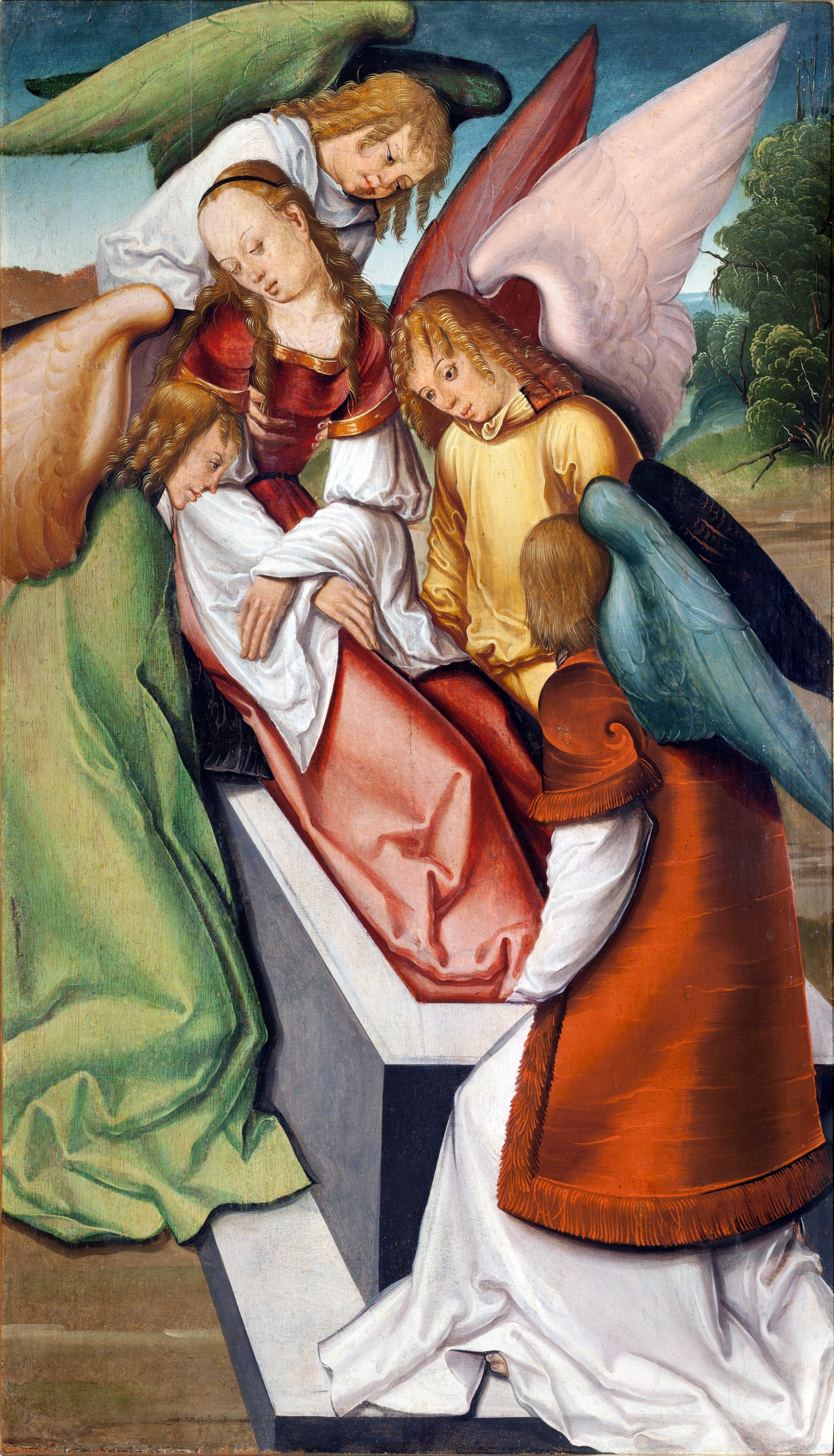
The Burial of St Catherine

== Description and classification ==
The now dismantled altarpiece could have originally comprised a central part with two pairs of hinged wings, from which two paintings survive. If the altarpiece had fixed wings, however, the number of lost paintings is greater. The panels depict six scenes from the life, martyrdom and burial of St Catherine. The most widespread literary text on the life St Catherine during the Late Gothic period was The Golden Legend by Jacobus de Voragine, written in the third quarter of the 14th century – this date is probably connected with the decoration of Chapel of the Holy Cross at Karlštejn Castle. It does not explain some of the depicted scenes that precede the meeting of Catherine and Emperor Maxentius. Possible interpretations can be found in more detailed versions of the legend of St Catherine, for example the old Bohemian version called the Stockholm Legend or illuminated manuscripts (Belles Heures of Jean de France, Duc de Berry, 1415) and glass paintings (St William's Church, Strasbourg, 1470–1475).

One possible origin of the painting is the convent Church of St Catherine belonging to the Augustinian Order in the New Town of Prague that was founded by Charles IV in 1354. Following destruction during the Hussite Wars, the church interior was gradually repaired from 1518 onwards and in 1522 its new high altar was consecrated.

St Catherine was very popular in the broader area of Central Europe, and numerous churches and chapels were consecrated to her. At Karlštejn Castle, St Catherine's Chapel served as the private oratory of Emperor Charles IV who believed that she saved his life when, on her feast day of 25 November 1332, he achieved victory in the Battle of San Felice in northern Italy. St Catherine was worshipped as the bride of Christ, promising herself to him as a child, and as the protector of virgins and young girls. She was the patron saint of apprentices, universities and several professions connected with her martyrdom (such as wheelers, printers and sailors).

=== Parts of the altar ===
==== St Catherine Reading / The Martyrdom of St Catherine ====
This lime-wood panel, measuring 76.5 x 44 cm and 7–8 mm thick, is painted in tempera on both sides. Originally in the Princely Collections of Liechtenstein, it was sold in 1964 to Galerie Sanct Lucas in Vienna. In 1969 it was acquired for the collection of the National Gallery in Prague (inv. no. O 12306) in exchange for another work. It was restored in the 1960s in Vienna and in 1999 at the National Gallery (A. Třeštíková). The legend tells of St Catherine's chastity, beauty and renowned learnedness. Following the death of her father, King Costa, she ruled Alexandria. This scene depicts St Catherine holding an open book and accompanied by ladies of the court. She is most likely absorbed in reading prayers before being summoned to Emperor Maxentius.

The painting of the Martyrdom of St Catherine is the finest one of the entire set. Several parts of the underdrawing recall the expressive lines of the underdrawing of the Litoměřice Altarpiece; they are not identical, however. The composition is characterised by its masterful arrangement of the relations between the figures and space, as well as by how it connects the foreground and middle ground of what is happening in the picture. It is also marked by a fascination for the perspectival depiction of the instrument of torture.

==== St Catherine before Emperor Maxentius ====
This lime-wood panel, measuring 77 x 44.5 cm, was originally part of the hinged wing that was cut up lengthwise; it is now 1–4 mm thick and is glued to a layered panel. Its origin is unknown. In 1946 it was in a private collection in Budapest, and from the 1950s was in the collection of A. Geber in the USA. After the collector died, it was auctioned at Sotheby's in New York and acquired in 1998 from there by the National Gallery in Prague (inv. no. O 17425). It was restored in 1998–1999 at the National Gallery (A. Třeštíková) and reinforced at the back (D. Zika).

==== The Burial of St Catherine ====
This lime-wood panel, measuring 77 x 44.5 cm and 1–4 mm thick, originally formed a whole with the preceding picture and was acquired for the collection of the National Gallery (inv. no. 17426) along with it at the Sotheby's auction mentioned above. Both paintings were included in a catalogue accompanying an exhibition at the Szépművészeti Múzeum in Budapest in 1946. It was restored by A. Třeštíková at the National Gallery between 1998 and 1999.

==== The Conceit of St Catherine ====
This oil painting on a wooden panel measuring 70.5 x 45.5 cm and 5–7 mm thick has been cut off at the top and bottom. The panel formed part of a hinged or fixed altarpiece wing. Its origin is unknown. The picture's current owner, G. Schäfer (Schweinfurt, Germany) bought it in 1961 at the Auction House of Adolf Weinmüller in Munich (inv. no. 4189).

==== St Catherine Visiting the Hermit ====
The oil painting on a wooden panel measuring 70 x 45.5 cm and 5–7 mm thick has been cut off at the top and bottom. It has been reinforced with parquetage at the back. Its origin is unknown. The picture's current owner, G. Schäfer (Schweinfurt, Germany) bought it in 1961 at the Auction House of Adolf Weinmüller in Munich (inv. no. 4190).

=== The missing parts and possible reconstruction of the altarpiece’s original appearance ===
At the centre of the altarpiece there could have been a picture of the Madonna and Child among the Holy Virgins or, more likely, the Madonna and Child with St Catherine, a scene called the Betrothal of St Catherine. With Late Gothic picture cycles, there no longer existed firm rules for the horizontal or vertical sequence of the individual scenes, which is why it is impossible to create a reliable reconstruction of the arrangement of the altarpiece's wings.

The iconography of the surviving pictures is not a wholly standard illustration of the legend and it is not, therefore, possible to infer what the missing parts would have been. In addition to this, it is impossible to distinguish between the inner and outer sides of the wings on the basis of a different background or gilding. Judging by the surviving parts, it is probable that each wing was made up of two panels placed above each other in a joint frame. When they are compared with the two panels painted on both sides that are in the collection of the National Gallery, it can be assumed that the single-sided paintings in the Schäfer collection were also created by the panels being cut lengthwise and that the paintings on the back were removed or lost.

=== The painting style ===
The paintings of the legend of St Catherine of Alexandria are ascribed to the late work of the Master of the Litoměřice Altarpiece and his workshop. Numerous connections have been found with the Litoměřice Altarpiece, the Altarpiece of the Holy Trinity and the Strahov Altarpiece, the Votive Panel of Jan of Vertemberk and several paintings of the Legend of St Wenceslas. These works have in common a similar physiognomy and figure type, costume details, spatial design with architectural elements and details of landscapes in the background.

The landscape framework of these paintings is stylistically uniform, showing a landscape with lush vegetation, forked dry branches and fantastical architecture. The use of aerial perspective and several different spatial planes points to the experience learned by a painter of the Danube School. The St Catherine cycle differs with its less perfect construction of the pictorial space and the heterogeneous combination of several spatial planes, the way the figures move and the way their drapery folds, which is more decorative in character. The effort to unify the action in the picture leads to a repetition of the figural types and their clothing; at the same time, however, it also accentuates certain stylistic differences.

=== The painting technique ===
The restoration of the pictures that had been newly acquired for the collection of the National Gallery proved, when compared with other works by the Master of the Litoměřice Altarpiece, that a similar painting technique was used. The quality of the painting execution is, however, not as fine and corresponds to the participation of several painters within the workshop. Several differences in the preparation of the foundation layer and layering of the paint were also detected.

The underlayer of the paintings was created with an insulating layer of glue-size on to which a layer of natural chalk bound with glue-size was applied. On to this, an insulating layer most probably made of egg white and gelatine was applied. The underdrawings of the individual paintings are mainly relatively schematic – an exception being the Martyrdom, which has more in common with the careful modelling of volume seen in the Litoměřice Altarpiece. In two other panels, the underdrawing of the drapery has much in common with the underdrawing of the Altarpiece of the Holy Trinity. The flesh tones are underlaid by a fine layer of lead white and are modelled with a single layer of paint containing white paint, vermillion and charcoal black. The use of the unusual purple pigment of fluorite in the underpainting and red enamel with an organic component is typical for the workshop of the Master of the Litoměřice Altarpiece. The colour quality of the fluorite layer varies with the size of the grains of pigment, ranging from light, almost translucent tones to a rich purple and becoming more intense with the size of the particles. Iron red, white paint and vermillion are used for the modelling of the drapery, while the top layer is made up of red organic enamel containing anorganic earth-siliceous, calcic and clay components. The layers of the green contain verdigris, lead-tin yellow or yellow ochre and white paint. The blue is made up of azurite in combination with white paint and yellow ochre, and in the underpainting it is made up of azurite combined with fluorite and iron red.

== Sources ==
- Jan Liška, Deskové obrazy mistra litoměřického oltáře. Praha, 106 pp. bachelor thesis, Catholic Theological Faculty, Institute of Christian Art History, Charles University, Prague 2008
- Štěpánka Chlumská, Radka Štefců, Anna Třeštíková, Obrazy z legendy o sv. Kateřině Alexandrijské, Národní galerie v Praze 1999, ISBN 80-7035-207-8
- Jaroslav Pešina, Kateřinský cyklus litoměřického mistra, Umění XXIII, 1975, s. 219-225
