= Rueland Frueauf the Elder =

Austrian painter

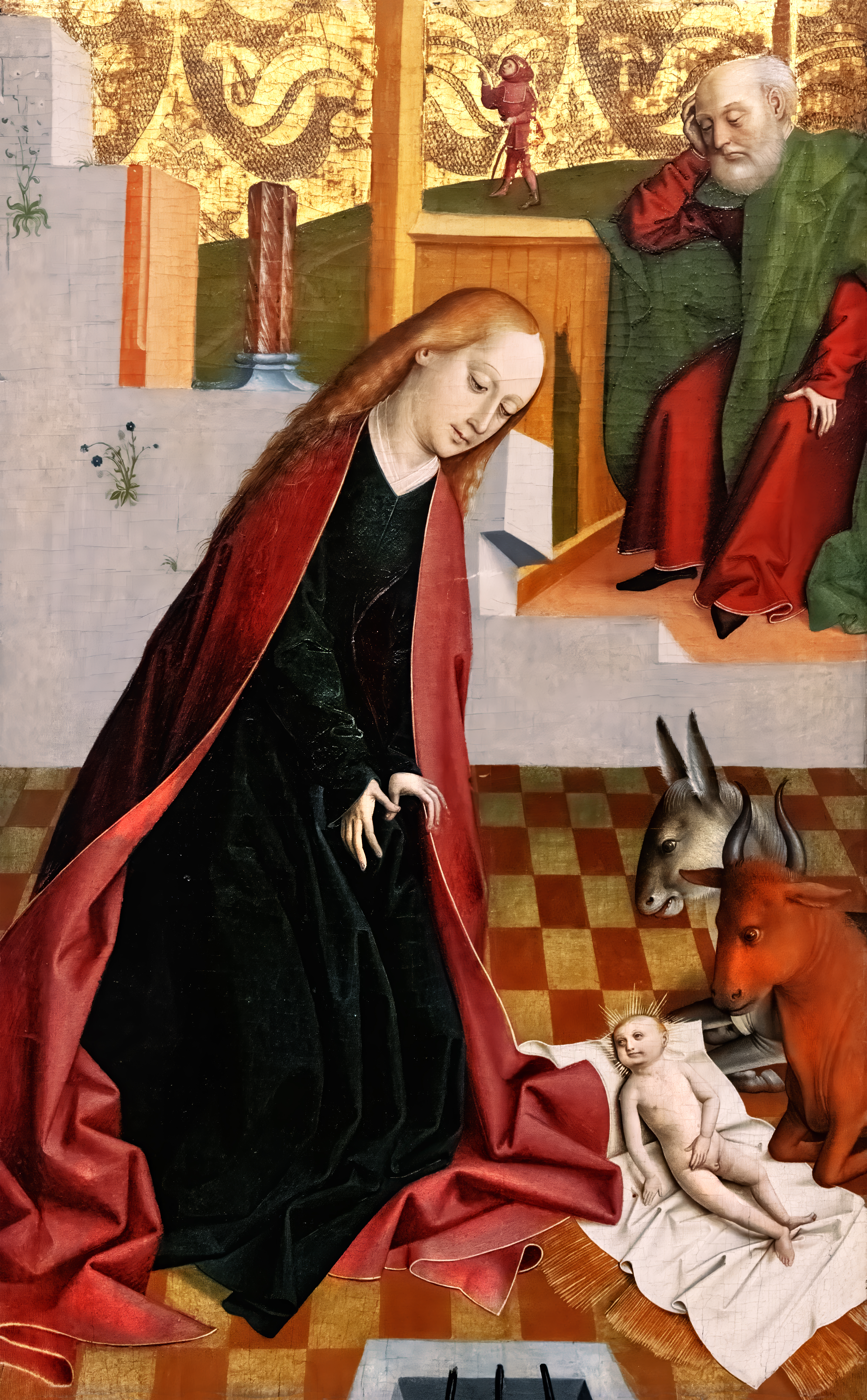
Nativity by Rueland Frueauf the Elder, 1507, Museo Correr, Venice

Rueland Frueauf the Elder (c. 1440 – 1507) was an Austrian Late-Gothic painter.

== Biography ==
Frueauf was born in Obernberg am Inn, and lived and worked there most of his life. He primarily painted frescoes in local churches. In 1484 he was appointed as a consultant to work with Michael Pacher on an altarpiece for the Franciscan Order. His son Rueland Frueauf the Younger also became a painter. Frueauf the Elder died in Passau in 1507.

== Gallery ==
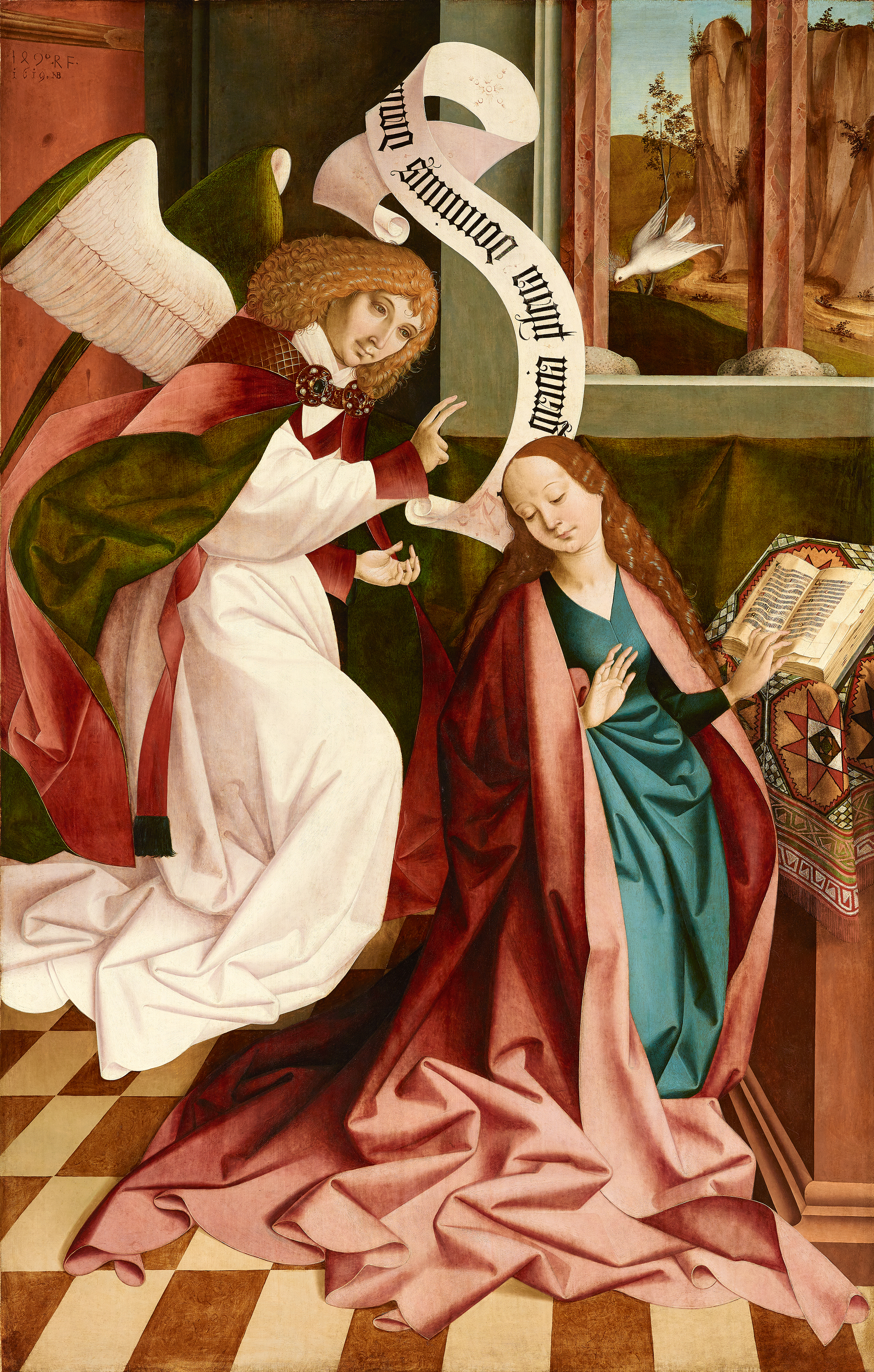
Annunciation to Mary (1490)

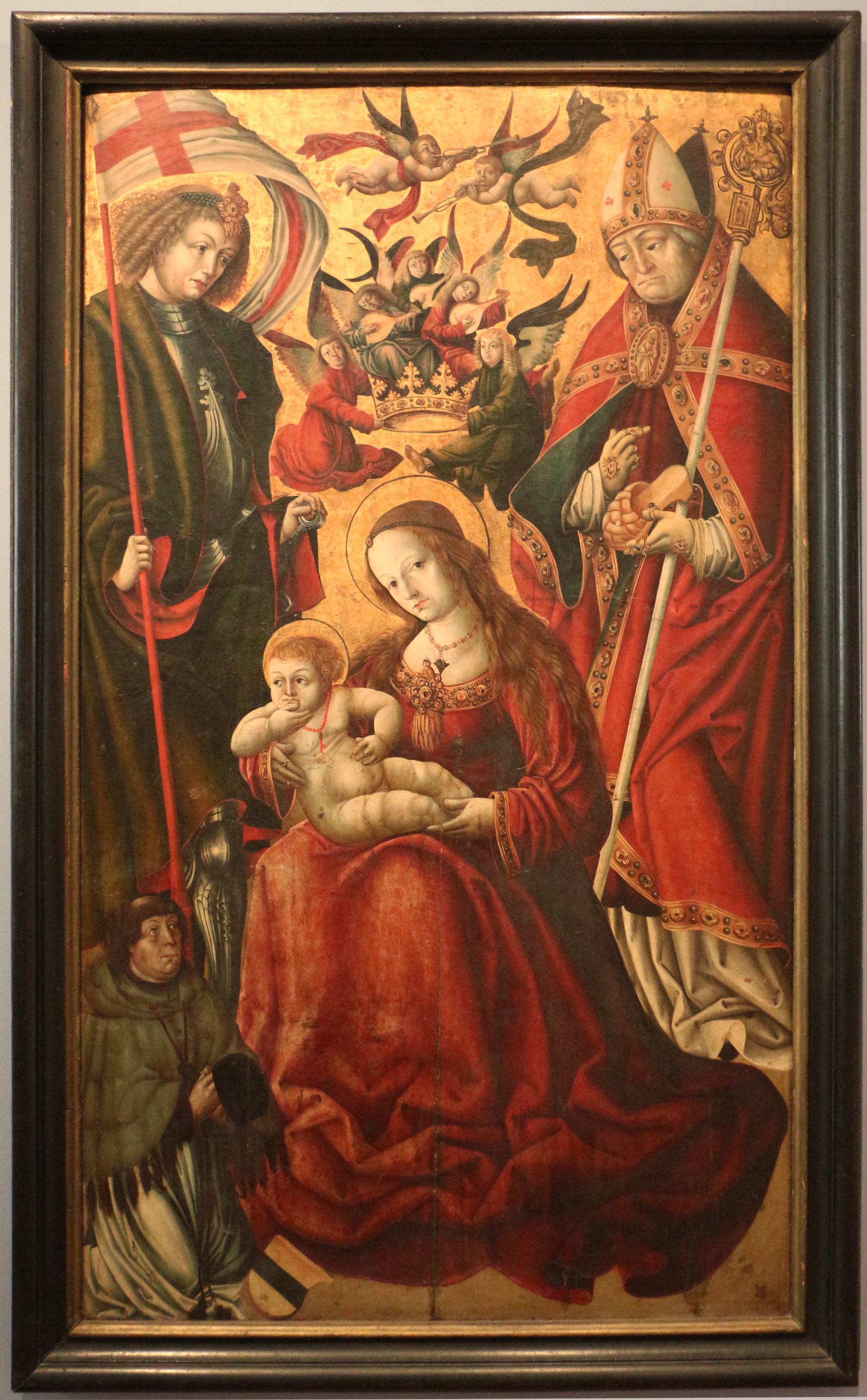
Madonna enthroned between Saint George and Saint Vigilius (circa 1490)

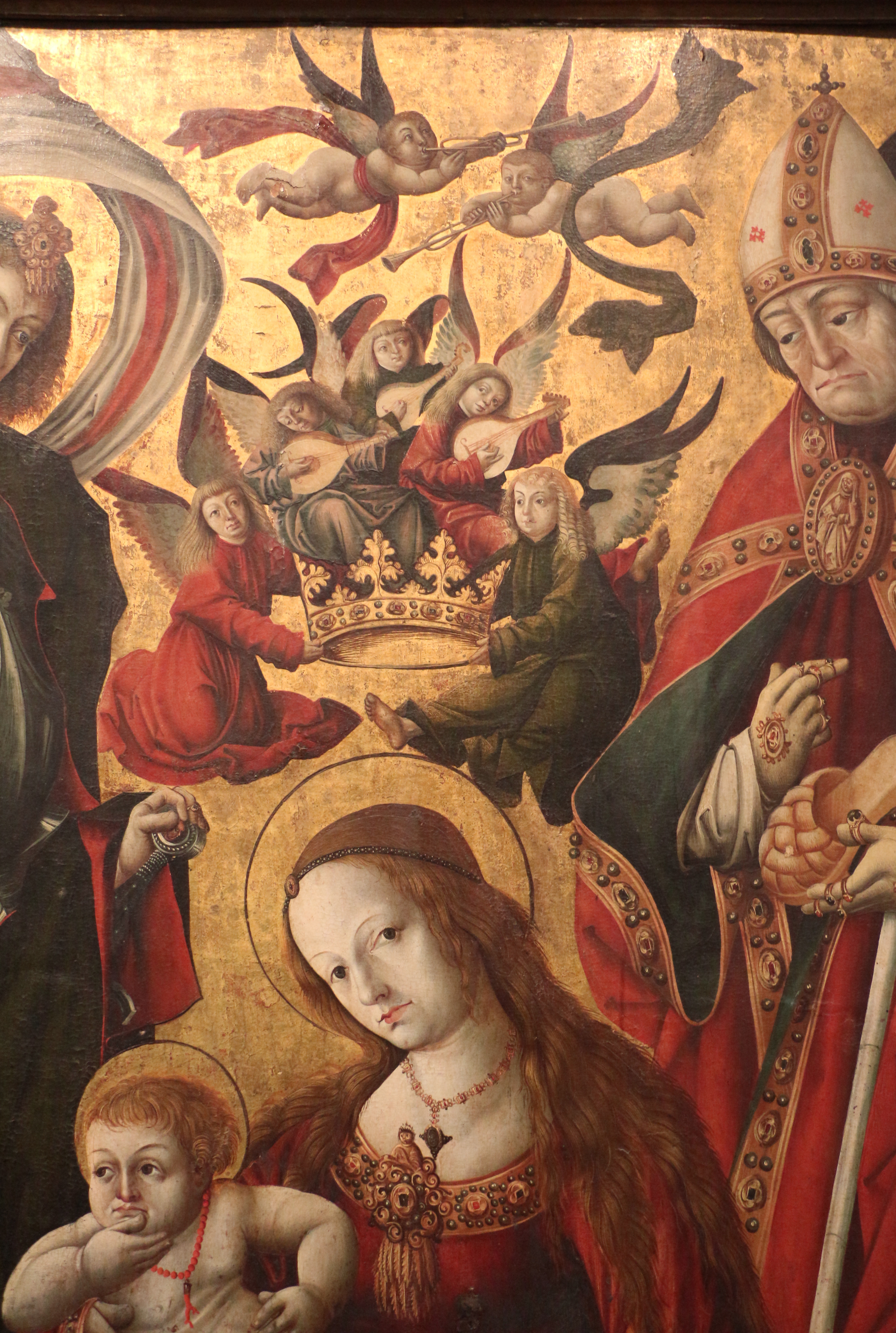
Detail

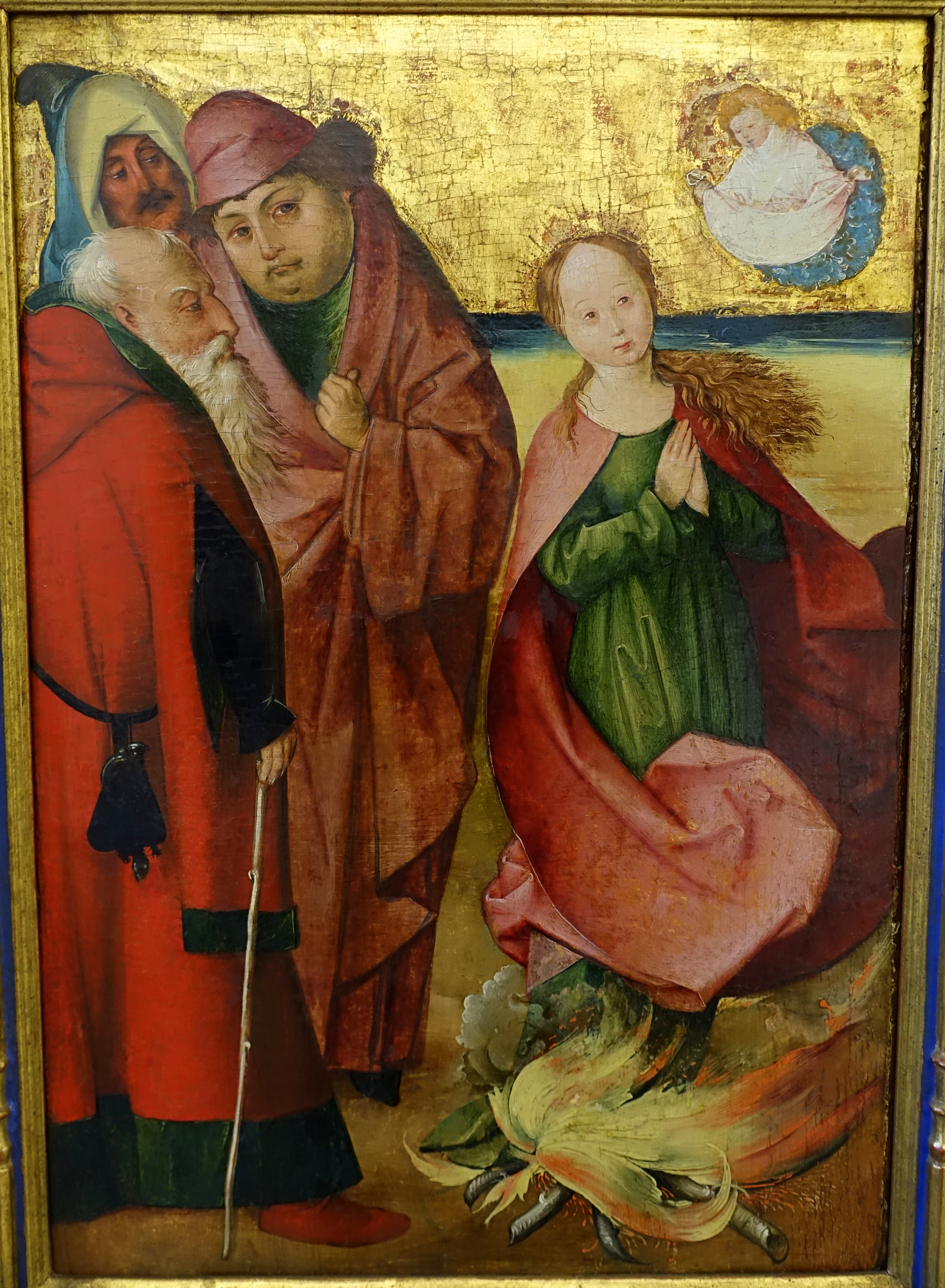
Saint Apollonia in the Fire (circa 1510)

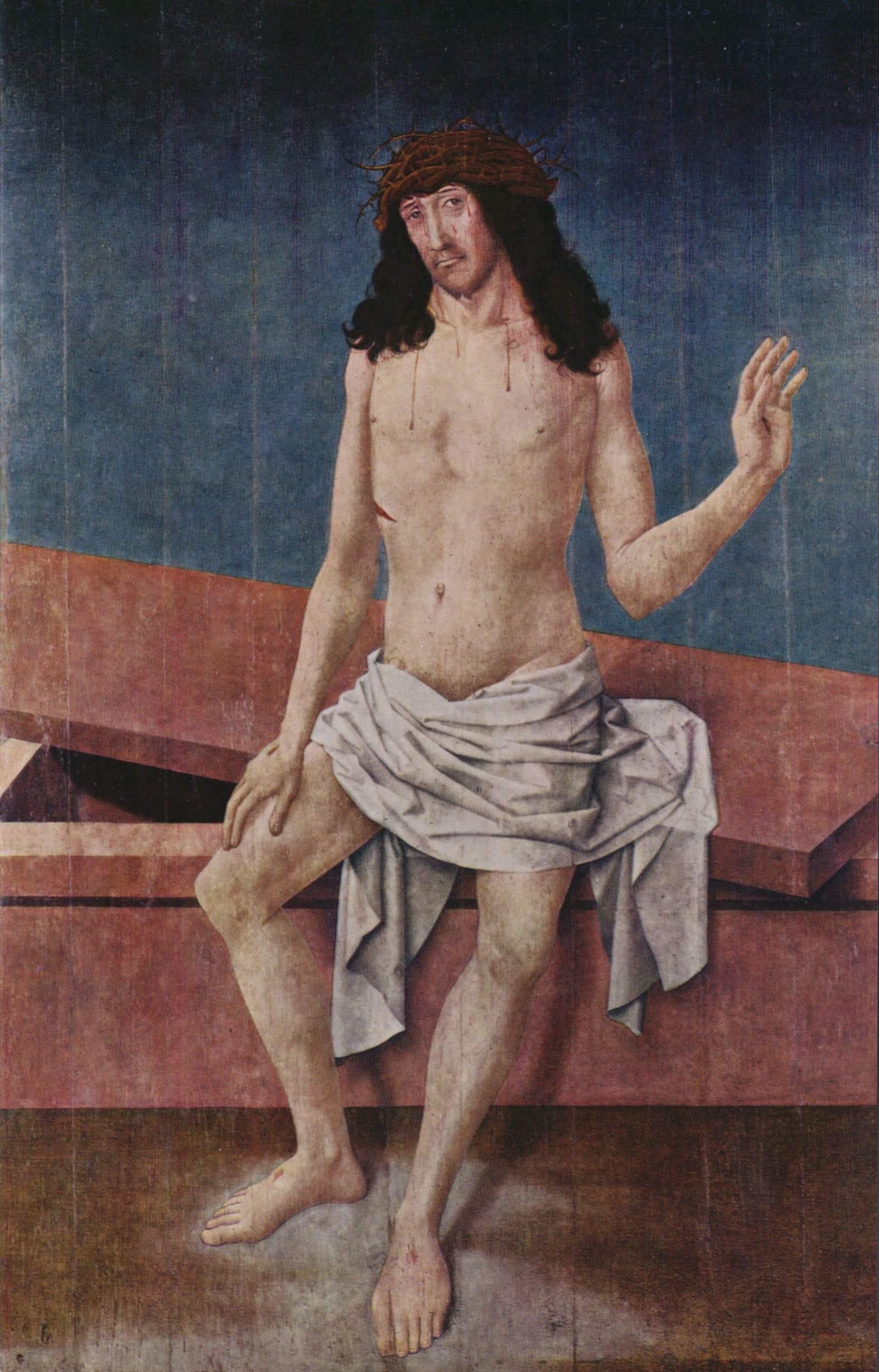
Christ, Man of Sorrows by Rueland Frueauf the Elder, Alte Pinakothek, 1500

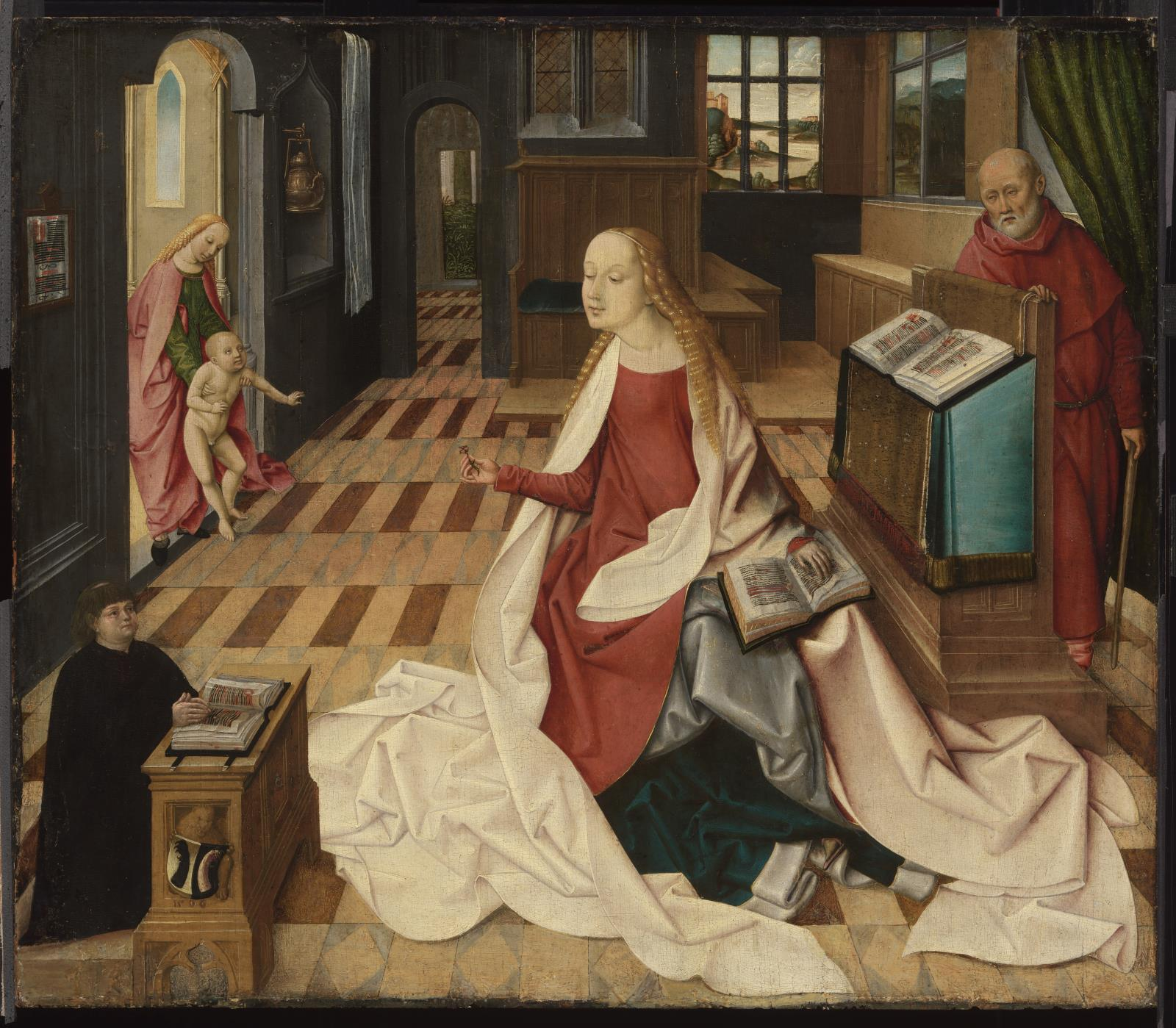
The Education of the Infant Christ (1506)
