= Rueland Frueauf the Younger =

German painter

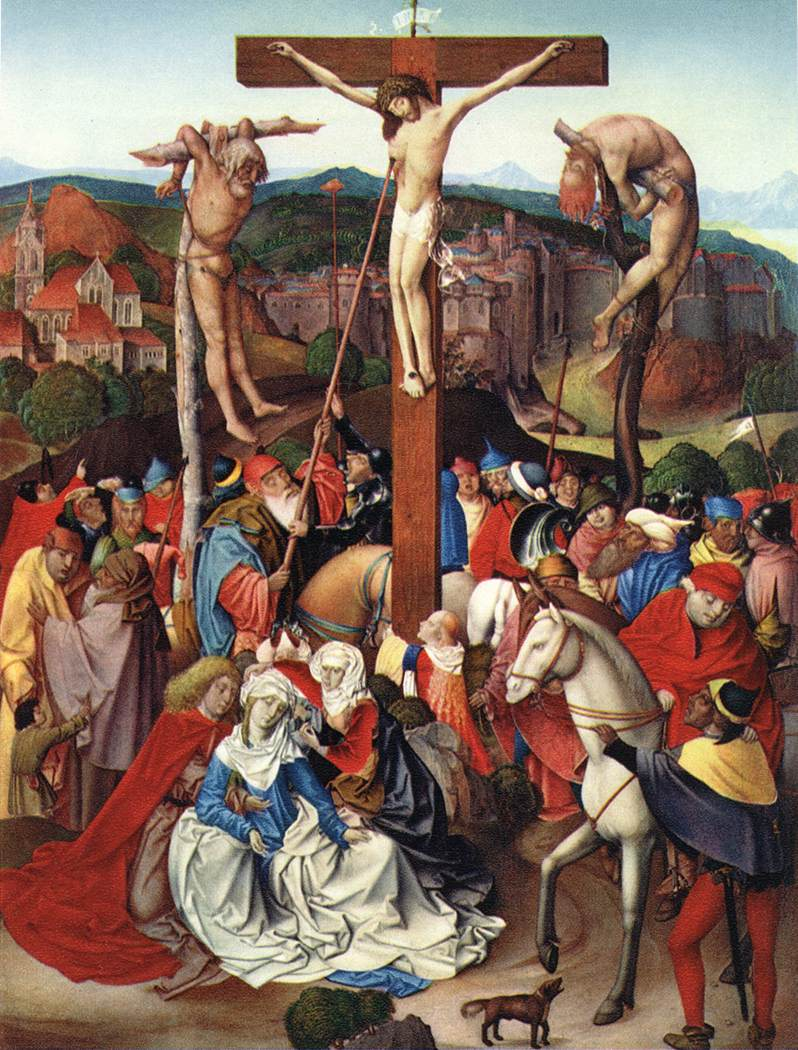
Crucifixion by Rueland Frueauf the Younger, 1496

Rueland Frueauf the Younger (c. 1470 – after 1545) was a German Late-Gothic painter.

== Biography ==
Frueauf was born in Salzburg, Austria in c. 1470 and later moved to Passau, Germany where he lived and worked for the rest his life. He produced primarily paintings, altarpieces, and frescoes for local churches. His father Rueland Frueauf the Elder was also a painter.

Frueauf the Younger died in Passau.
