= List of brewing companies in Germany =

This is a list of brewing companies in Germany. Beer plays a significant role in the German culture, and for many years, German beer was brewed in strict adherence to the Reinheitsgebot, a regulation that permitted only water, hops, yeast, and malt as beer ingredients. This law also stipulated that beers not exclusively using barley-malts, such as wheat beer, must be top-fermented.

Since 1993, the brewing process has been regulated by the Provisional German Beer Law, which allows a broader range of ingredients and additives in top-fermenting beers. However, these additives must be completely removed, or at least as much as possible, from the final product.

== Brewing companies in Germany ==
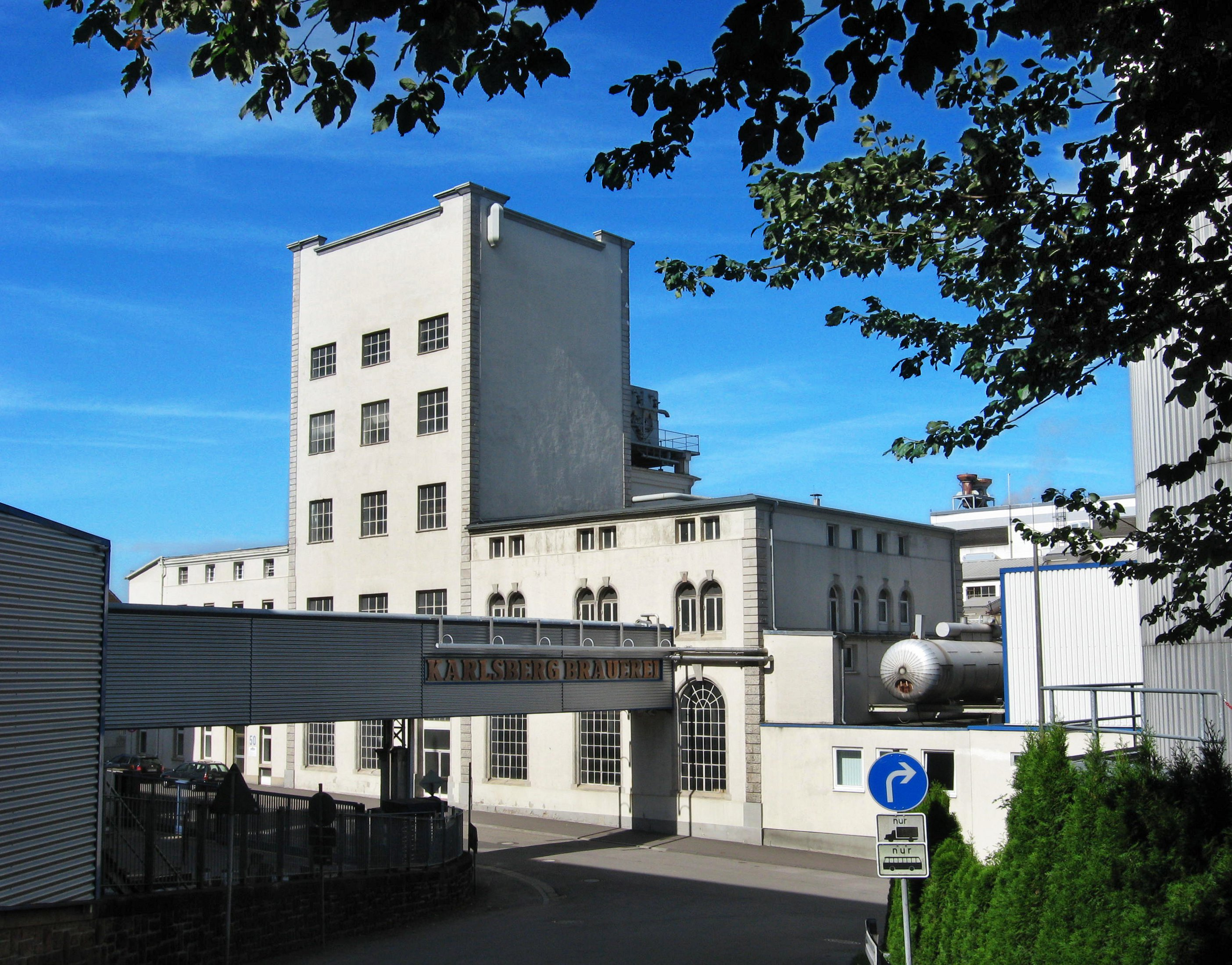
A view of the older parts of the Karlsberg brewery on Karlsbergstraße

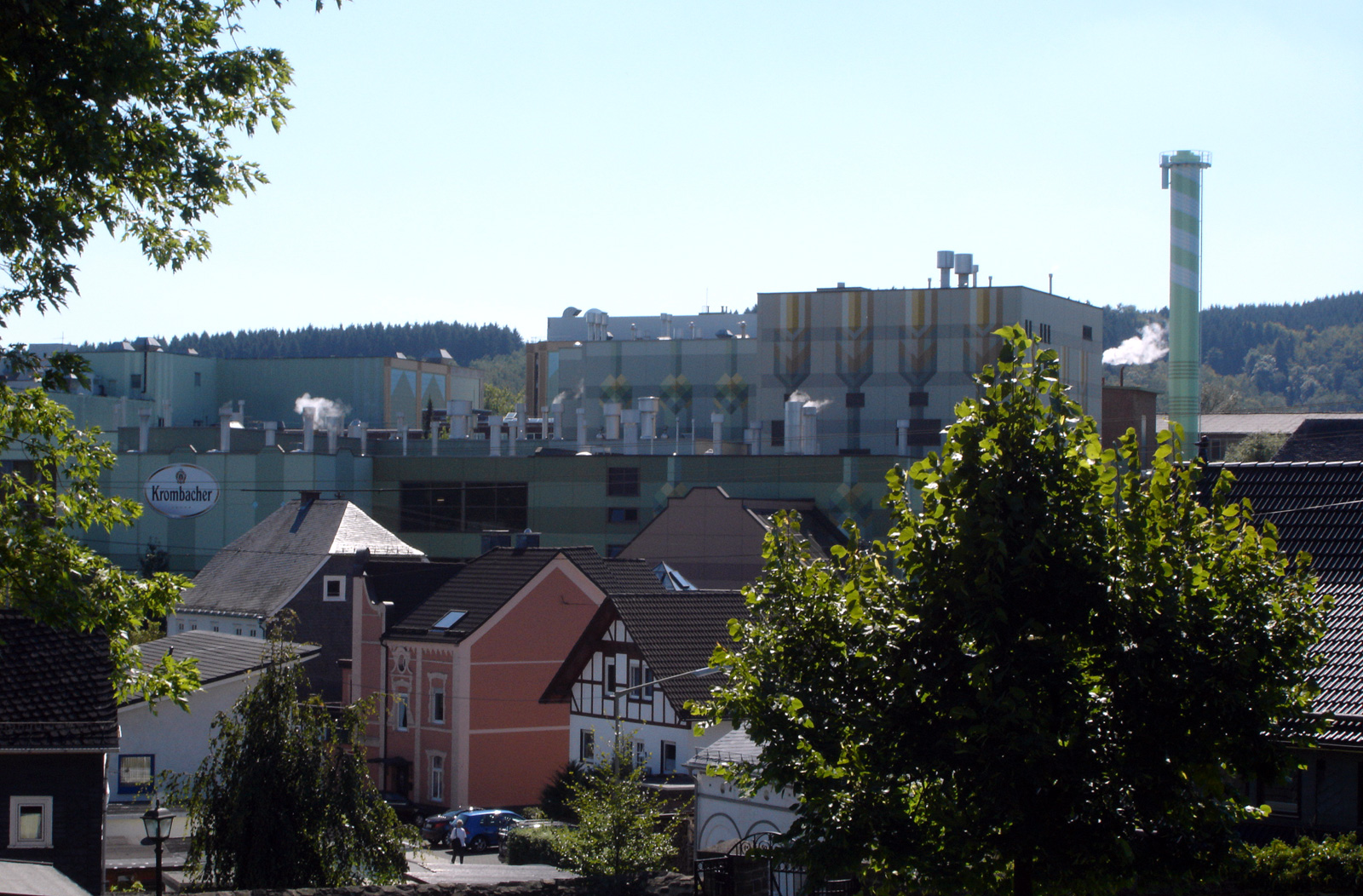
Krombacher Brauerei

- Aktienbrauerei Kaufbeuren
- Aldersbach brewery
- Augustiner Bräu
- Ayinger Brewery
- Beck's Brewery
- Benediktiner Weissbrau
- Bitburger Brewery
- Brauerei Bub
- Brauerei Clemens Härle
- Brauerei Gebr. Maisel
- Brauerei Friedmann
- Brauerei Greif
- Brauerei Leikeim
- Brauerei Neder
- Brauerei Paderborner
- Brauerei Rittmayer
- Brauhaus am Kreuzberg
- Cölner Hofbräu Früh
- Diebels
- Dinkelacker
- Dortmunder Actien Brauerei
- Edelweißbrauerei Farny
- Eichbaum
- Einbecker Brewery
- Erdinger
- Ernst Barre Private Brewery
- Familienbrauerei Bauhöfer
- Flensburger Brauerei
- G. Schneider & Sohn
- Gaffel Becker & Co
- Gampertbräu
- Ganter Brewery
- Gardelegener Braugesellschaft
- Gröningers Braukeller
- Hacker-Pschorr Brewery
- Hasseröder
- Heinrich Reissdorf
- Herforder Brauerei
- Herrenhäuser Brewery
- Hofbräuhaus
- Holsten Brewery
- Jever Brewery
- Karlsberg
- Klosterbrauerei Andechs
- Klosterbrauerei Weißenohe
- Kommunbräu Rehau
- König Brauerei
- König Ludwig Schlossbrauerei
- Königsbacher
- Köstritzer
- Krombacher Brauerei
- Krug-Bräu
- Kuchlbauer Brewery
- Kulmbacher Brewery
- Licher Privatbrauerei
- Lillebräu
- Lindenbräu
- Löwenbräu
- Maisel Brau Bamberg
- Meckatzer Löwenbräu
- Mönschof
- Neuzeller Kloster Brewery
- Neumarkter Lammsbräu
- Oettinger Beer
- Paulaner Brauerei Gruppe
  - Paulaner Brewery
- Pinkus Müller
- Privatbrauerei Bischoff
- Privatbrauerei Hofmühl
- Pyraser Landbrauerei
- Radeberger Brewery
- Ritter St.Georgen-Brauerei
- Rothaus
- Schanzenbräu
- Schwaben Bräu
- Spaten-Franziskaner-Bräu
- Stadtbrauerei Spalt
- St. Erhard
- Jacob Stauder Brewery
- Sternburg
- Stuttgarter Hofbräu
- Tucher Bräu
- Veltins
- Warsteiner
- Weihenstephaner
- Wernesgrüner

Former

- Bavaria – St. Pauli Brewery
- Henninger Brewery
- Janssen and Bechly Brewery

== Best-selling brands ==
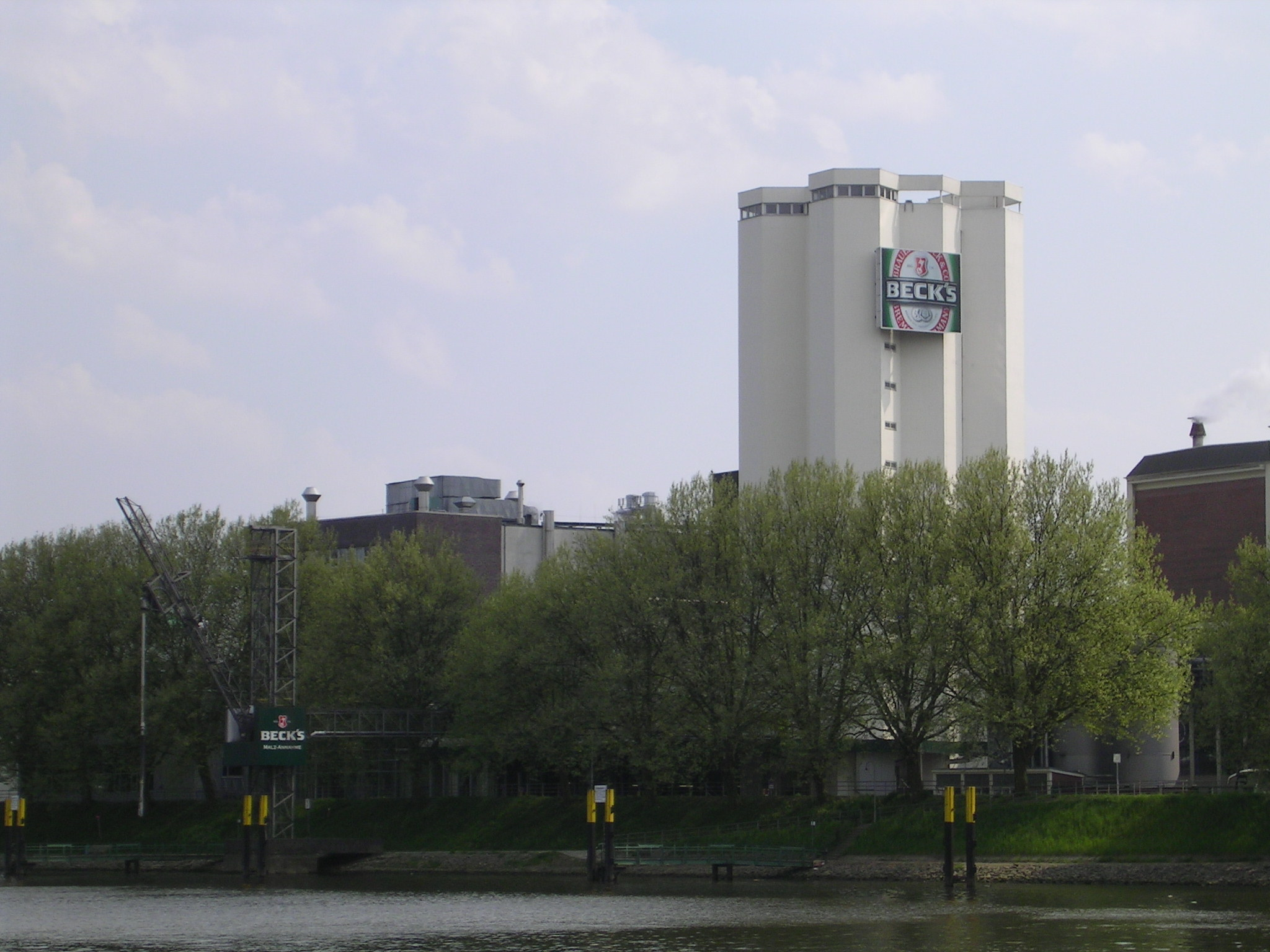
The Beck's Brewery in Bremen, Germany

Top ten best-selling German beer brands (2011–2012)
Brewery	Output in 2012 in million hectolitres	Location
Oettinger	5.89	Oettingen
Krombacher	5.46	Kreuztal
Bitburger	4.07	Bitburg
Beck's	2.78	Bremen
Warsteiner	2.77	Warstein
Hasseröder	2.75	Wernigerode
Veltins	2.72	Meschede
Paulaner	2.30	Munich
Radeberger	1.91	Radeberg
Erdinger	1.72	Erding

== See also ==
- Beer and breweries by region
- Beer in Germany
- German beer culture (category)
- Reinheitsgebot – German Beer Purity Order
