= Koblenzer Brauerei =

German brewery

- Interactive map of Koblenzer Brauerei
- Location: Koblenz, Germany
- Coordinates: 50°19′18.2″N 7°35′9″E
- Opened: 1689 (reincorporated in 2012)
- Closed: January 31st, 2024
- Employees: 62 (2013)
- Website: koblenzer.de

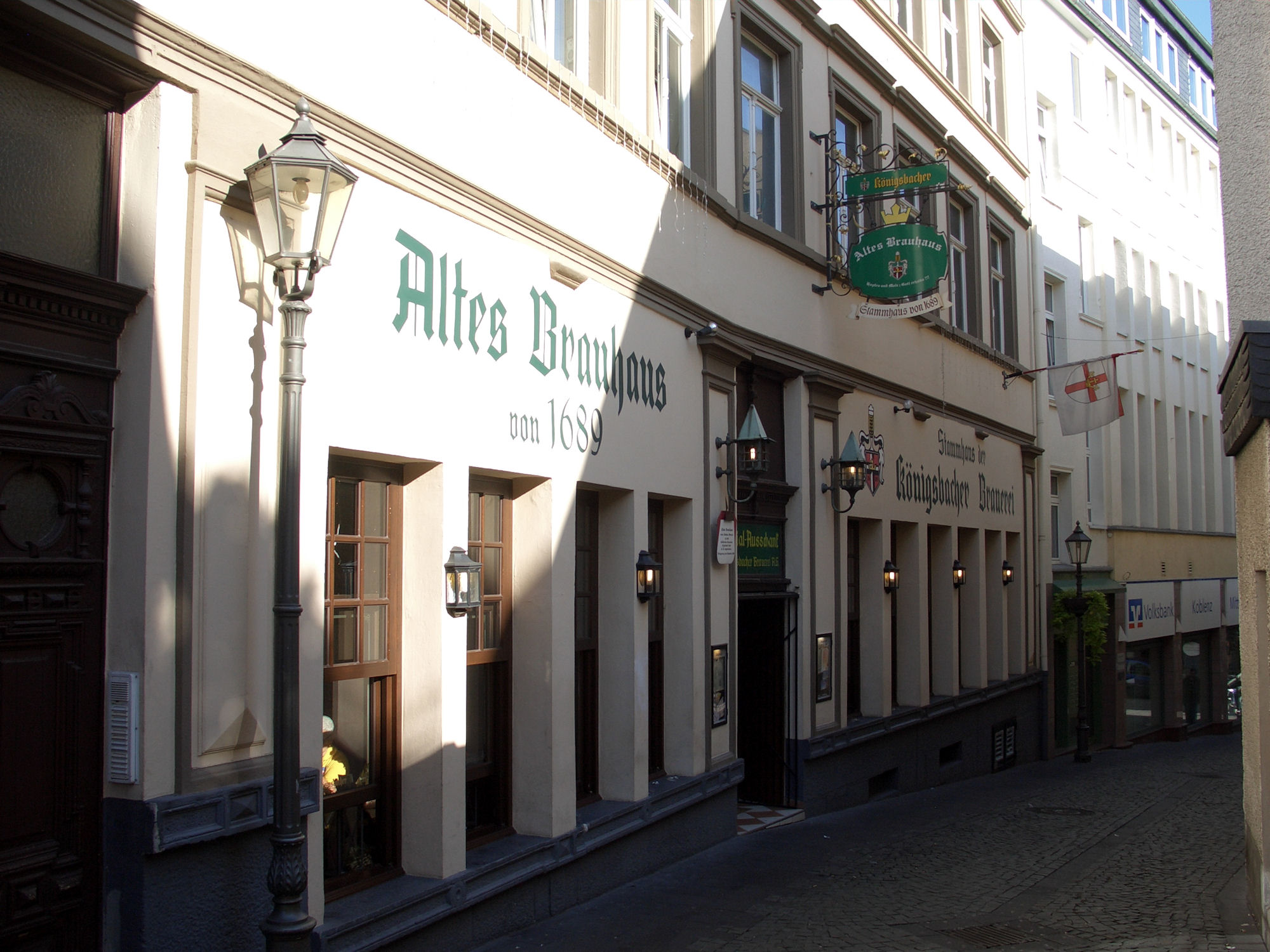
Königsbacher's Old Brewery (Altes Brauhaus) in the historic center of Koblenz, Germany

Koblenzer Brauerei (formerly Königsbacher Brauerei GmbH & Co KG) was a brewery in Koblenz, in the Rhineland-Palatinate state of Germany. Since its foundation in 1689, it had a tradition of brewing beer in the Old Brewery (Altes Brauhaus) in the historic center of Koblenz. In 1992, the Königsbacher Brewery was taken over by the Karlsberg Group. The Königsbacher Brewery's brands, but not the brewery building, were sold to the Bitburger brewery in early 2010. The brewery was sold and re-incorporated in 2012, the brand Königsbacher was abolished and the beer sold under the new brand Koblenzer. The brewery again entered insolvency proceedings in November 2023, and, since no new investors could be found, was finally shut down on January 31, 2024.

== Overview ==
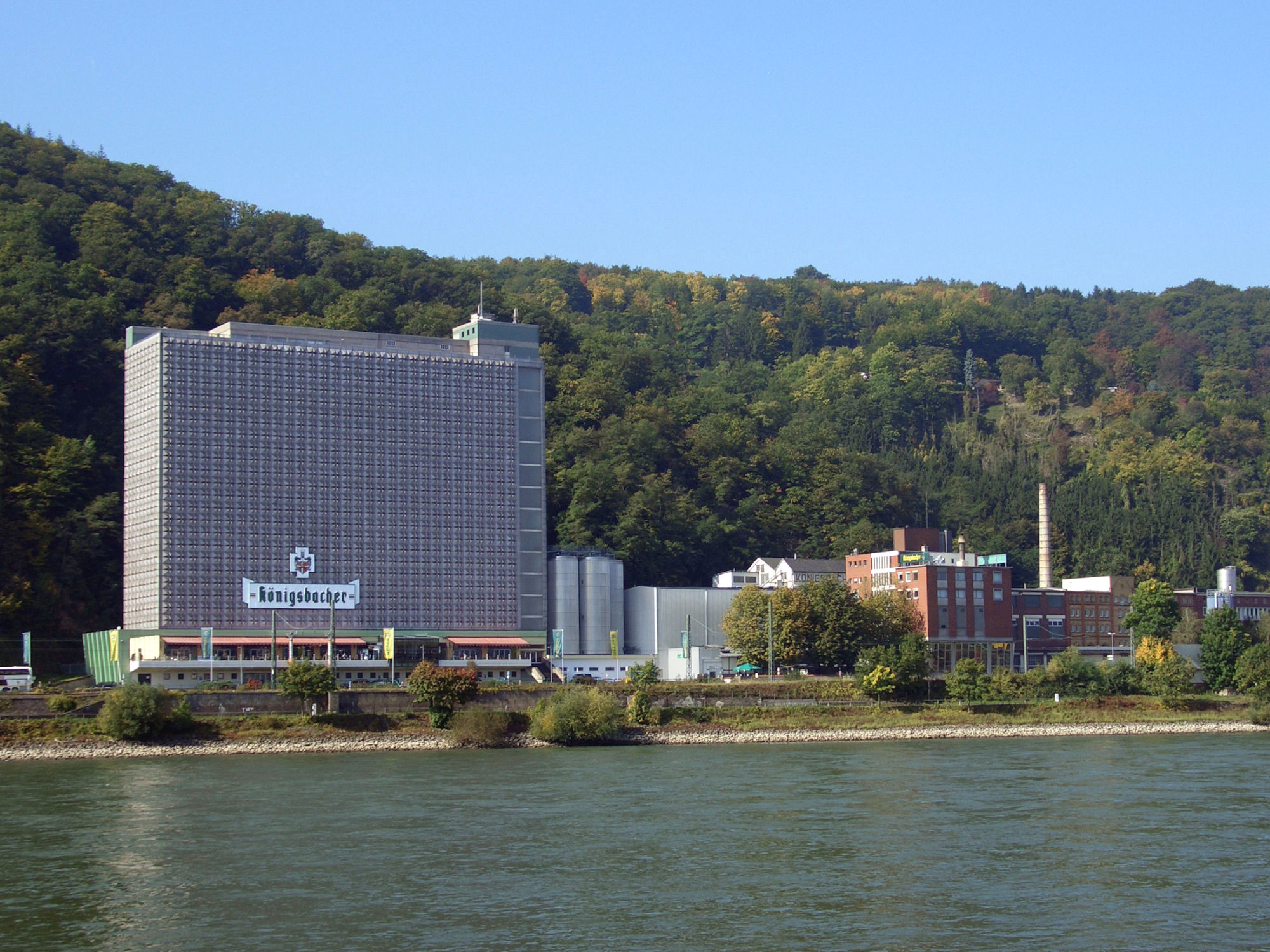
Königsbacher's new (1970) brewery in the Stolzenfels suburb of Koblenz

The former name comes from a small river near Koblenz named Königsbach (King's Brook), whose clear water was suitable for brewing beer: "Königsbacher" is German for "from the Königsbach".

Products included:

- Königsbacher Pilsener (a pilsener beer)
- Königsbacher Export
- Königsbacher 1689
- Nette Edel Pils (after the Rhine's tributary Nette)
- Zischke Kellerbier
- Königsbacher Radler
- Königsbacher Mai-Bock
- Königsbacher Fest-Bock

Sponsoring:

- The Königsbacher Brewery was a big sponsor for some sportsclubs of Koblenz, such as the TuS Koblenz football club (soccer).

== See also ==
- List of brewing companies in Germany
