= Paderborner Brauerei =

Brewery in the German city of Paderborn

Paderborner Brauerei, Haus Cramer GmbH & Co. KG
- Location: Paderborn, Germany
- Coordinates: 51°41′13″N 8°44′41″E
- Opened: 1852
- Annual production volume: 800,000 hectolitres (680,000 US bbl) in 2012
- Owned by: Warsteiner
- Website: paderborner-brauerei.de

Brauerei Paderborner is a brewery in the German city of Paderborn. The traditional Westphalian brewery was purchased by the German brewery-major Warsteiner in 1990.

== The Paderborner beer range ==
The Paderborner brewery was founded in 1852. Since 1990 it has been part of the Warsteiner brewery group.

There are two different sorts of Paderborner. The first is simply called "Paderborner Pilsener" and has a rather herbal taste with an unusual sweetness which is actually hops. Paderborner Pilsener Export has a reputation for being of lower quality but also a compromise between price and amount of alcohol (since it has a barely larger amount of alcohol).

The second type is called Paderborner Gold and has a much fresher taste. It is a more recent variety than the original Paderborner Pilsener which has been brewed in this area for over 100 years. It was developed when the big Warsteiner company bought the small local brewery of Paderborn.

Paderborner Gold is the favoured beer for all official festivities in the area.

The Paderborner brewery also offers mixed beers, namely with Cola and Lemon.

An attempt to copy the famous "Alt" beer (famous from Düsseldorf) was also made in 2008, named "Paderborner Alt"

The city of Paderborn is home to a great many festivals, including the Schützenfest ("shooting club festival") and the Libori festival.

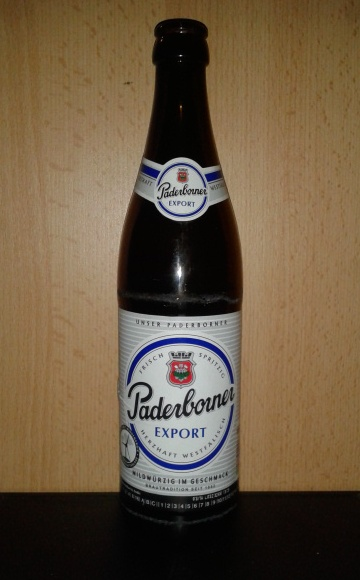
Paderborner Export

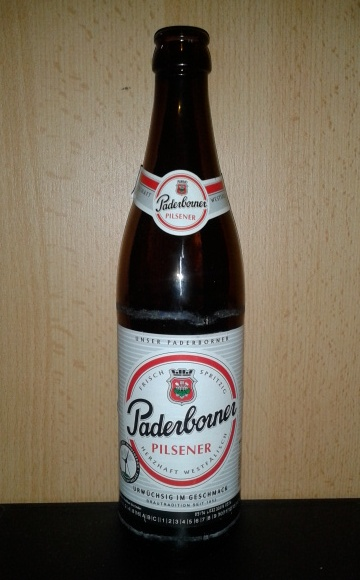
Paderborner Pilsener
