= Hasseröder =

German brewery, founded 1872

Hasseröder Brauerei GmbH
- Type: GmbH
- Location: Wernigerode, Saxony-Anhalt, Germany
- Coordinates: 51°50′40″N 10°45′16″E
- Opened: 1872
- Key people: Robert Hoppe
- Annual production volume: 2.25 million hectolitres (1,920,000 US bbl) in 2015
- Employees: 400
- Website: hasseroeder.de

Hasseröder is a brewery in Wernigerode, Saxony-Anhalt, Germany.

== History ==
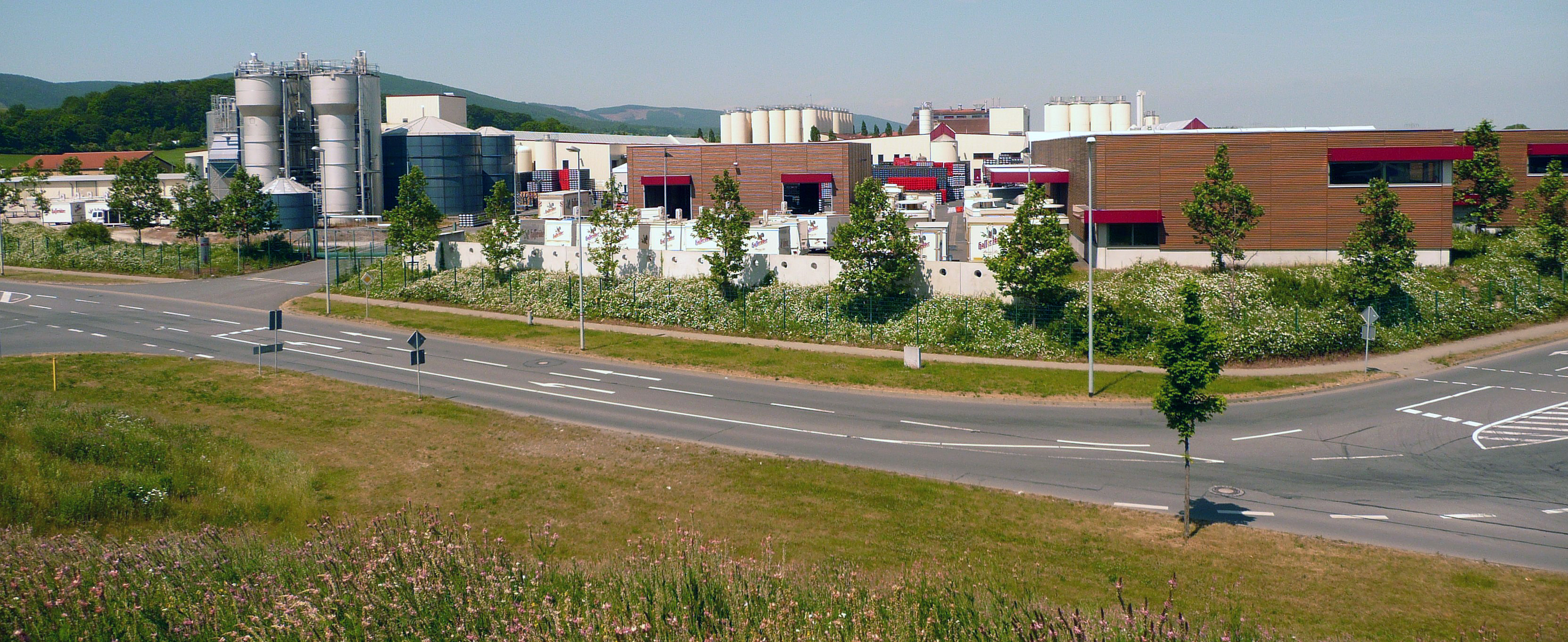
New Hasseröder brewery in Wernigerode

The company started in 1872, founded by Robert Hoppe under the name zum Auerhahn ("the Capercaillie"), in the Wernigerode district of Hasserode. In 1882 Ernst Schreyer assumed control of the brewery. In 1896 the brewery became a stock company (Aktiengesellschaft, AG), and in the same year put out 25,000 hectoliters of beer. It was renamed Hasseröder Brauerei in 1920. The brand remained in existence when Wernigerode became part of East Germany after World War II, marketed predominantly in the Magdeburg district.

Since reunification, Hasseröder has become the most consumed beer in the new states of Germany. Hasseröder ranks number 6 among Germany's best selling breweries.

== Products ==
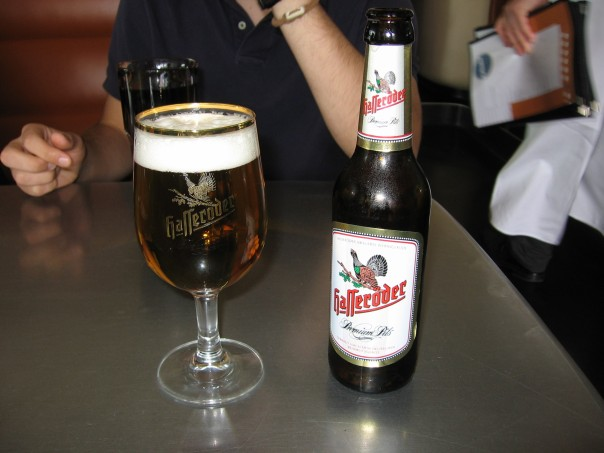
Hasseröder Pils

- Premium Pilsener: Pilsner style beer 4.9 abv
- Premium Export: Strong Export beer 5.5 abv
- Premium Radler: Mixed drink with Export and Lemonade 2.7 abv
- Premium Diesel: Mixed drink with Export and Cola 2.7 abv

== See also ==
- List of brewing companies in Germany
