= Erdinger =

German brewery

Privatbrauerei Erdinger Weißbräu Werner Brombach GmbH
- Interactive map of Privatbrauerei Erdinger Weißbräu Werner Brombach GmbH
- Location: Erding, Germany
- Coordinates: 48°18′24″N 11°54′26″E
- Opened: 1886; 140 years ago
- Annual production volume: 1.80 million hectolitres (1,530,000 US bbl) in 2015

The Privatbrauerei Erdinger Weißbräu Werner Brombach GmbH (also known as Erdinger Weißbräu) is a brewery in Erding, Germany. Its best-known products are its namesake Weißbiers (wheat beer).

== History ==
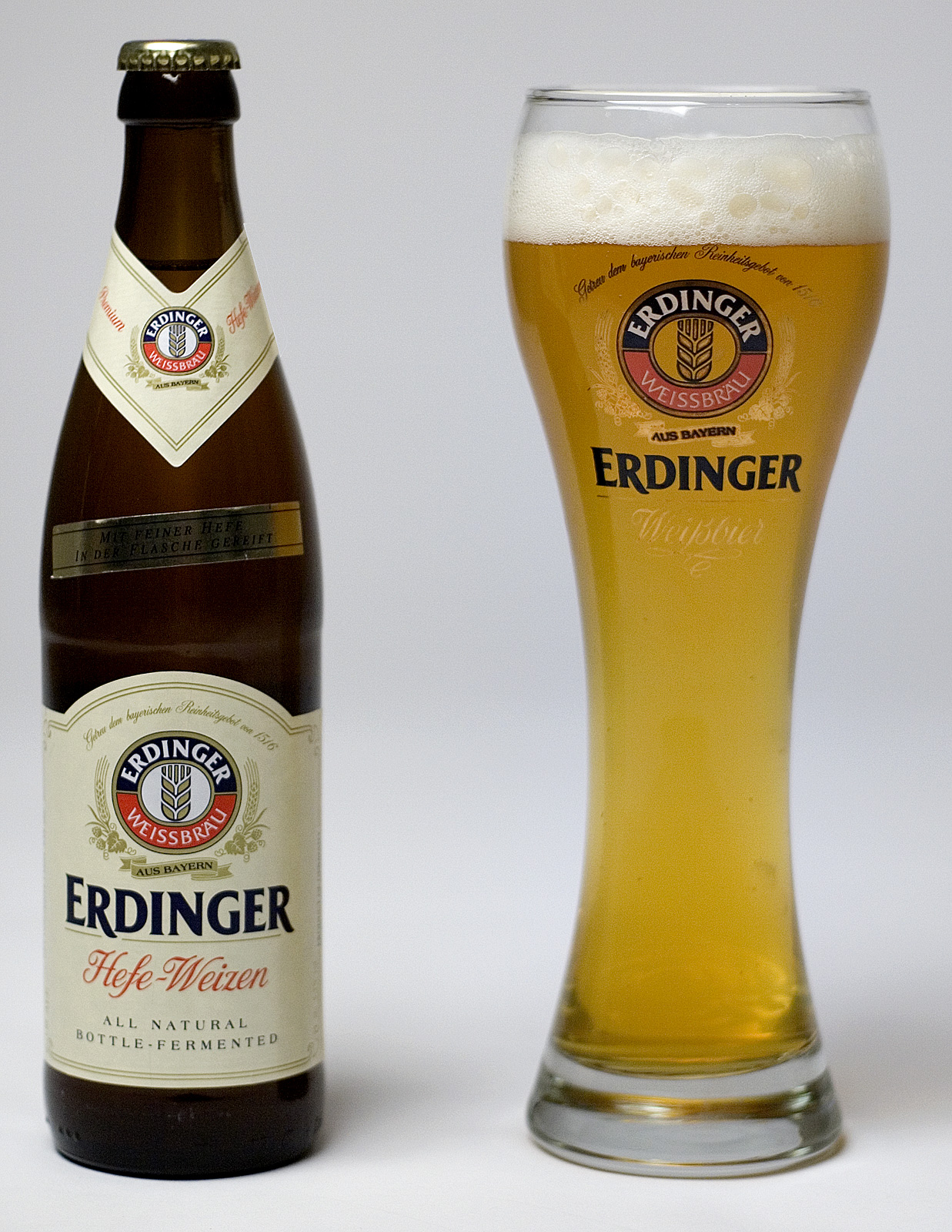
Erdinger Weißbier bottle and glass

Erdinger is the world's largest wheat beer brewery. It is widely available and popular across Germany and the European Union. Erdinger was founded in 1886 by Johann Kienle. Erdinger beer is the best-known culinary product of the town; however, the brewery did not receive its current name until 1949 from its owner Franz Brombach, who had acquired the brewery 14 years earlier. Franz Brombach's son, Werner Brombach took over in 1975 until his passing on 8 August 2026. Currently, there are 14 varieties available:

- Weißbier (wheat beer): a golden cloudy beer (ABV 5.3%, white/cream label, pictured)
- Dunkel (dark): a dark brown type (ABV 5.6%, black label),(5.3% in export bottle)
- Kristallweizen (crystal clear): a filtered Weißbier (ABV 5.3%, silver label)
- Pikantus (piquant): a dark weizenbock beer (ABV 7.3%)
- Leicht (light): a light beer (ABV 2.9%)
- Urweisse: traditional wheat beer (ABV 4.9%)
- Schneeweiße (snow-white): a seasonal beer brewed from November to February (ABV 5.6%)
- Alkoholfrei (alcohol free): an alcohol free version (ABV <0.5%)
- Festweiße (festive beer): a seasonal brew for Erding's Herbstfest (autumn festival, also known as Volksfest) (ABV 5.7%)
- Helles (lager): a lager beer (ABV 5.1%)
- Naturradler (shandy): a natural lemonade shandy made with the Erdinger Helles (ABV 2.0%)
- Helles Alkoholfrei (alcohol free lager): an alcohol free lager beer (ABV <0.5%)
- Alkoholfrei Zitrone (alcohol free shandy): an alcohol free shandy made with the Alkoholfrei Weißbier and natural lemonade (ABV <0.5%)
- Alkoholfrei Grapefruit (alcohol free shandy): an alcohol free shandy made from the Alkoholfrei Weißbier and natural grapefruit juice (ABV <0.5%)

Since 2015, Erdinger have marketed their Alkoholfrei beer as a post-activity sports drink.

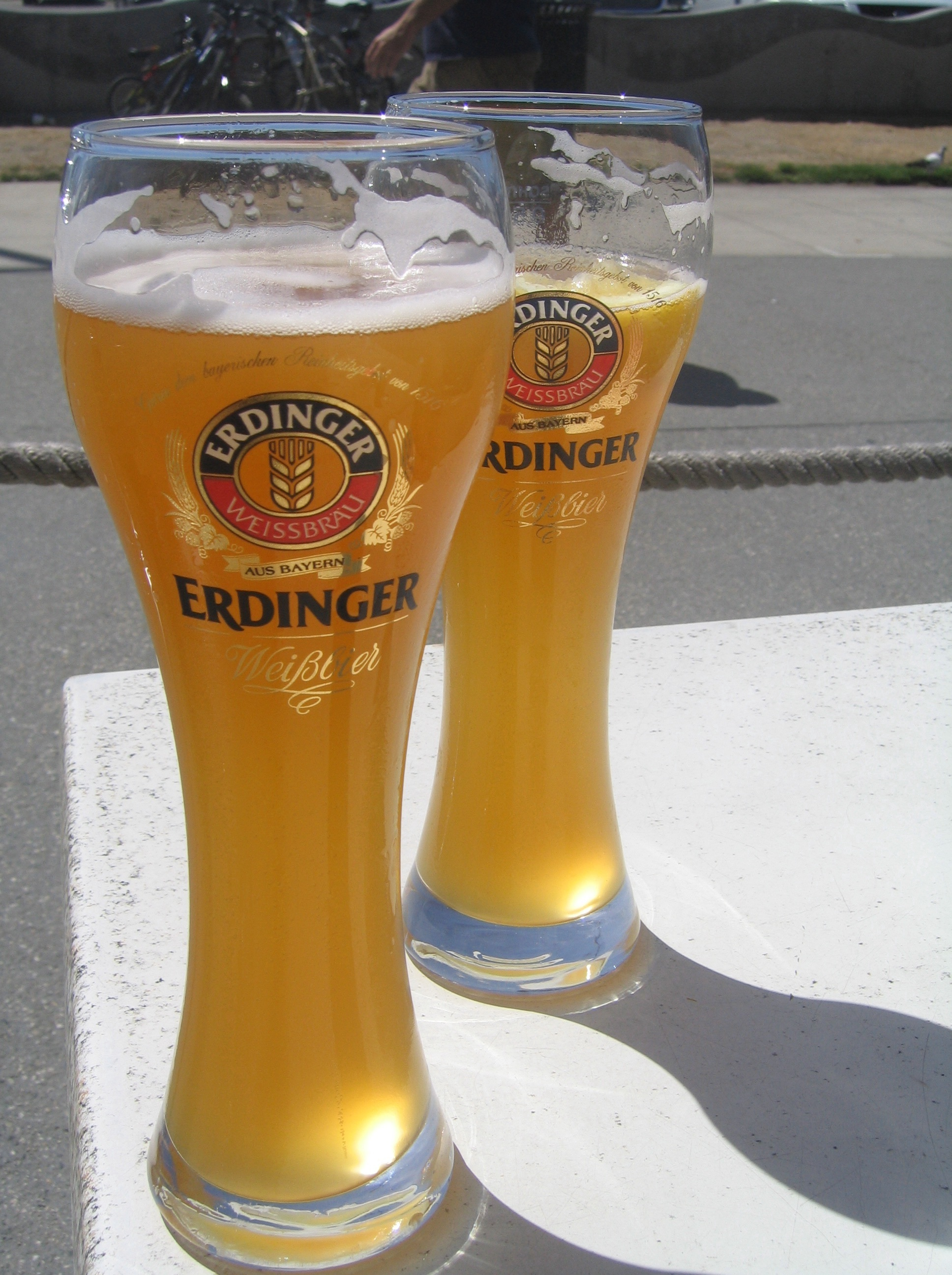
Erdinger Weißbier

== See also ==
- German beer
- Hefeweizen
- Helles
- Doppelbock
- List of brewing companies in Germany
