= Schwaben Bräu =

Brewery in Stuttgart, Germany

- Location: Stuttgart, Germany
- Coordinates: 48°46′5″N 9°10′14″E
- Annual production volume: 800,000 hectolitres (680,000 US bbl) (2013)
- Owned by: Dinkelacker-Schwaben Bräu GmbH und Co. KG

Schwaben Bräu (also Schwabenbräu) is a brewery owned by Dinkelacker-Schwaben Bräu GmbH und Co. KG and located in Stuttgart, Germany. The company owns the largest brewery in the German state of Baden-Württemberg.

== Products ==
The Schwaben Bräu brand consists of eight different types of beer.

- Das Natürtrübe, a bottom-fermented, unfiltered lager.
- Original, a bottom-fermented beer.
- Das Echte, a bottom-fermented Märzen.
- Meister-Pils, a bottom-fermented pilsner. Differs from Das Natürtrübe in that it is filtered.
- Das Schwarze, a bottom-fermented dark beer (Dunkel).
- Das Helle, a bottom-fermented Helles.
- Das Weizen, an unfiltered wheat beer.
- Das Urtyp Export, a bottom-fermented export beer.

Schwaben Bräu uses flip-top bottles incorporating a re-sealable porcelain stopper held in place by metal clasps to pressure seal the beer bottles.
