= Janssen and Bechly Brewery =

Former brewery in Neubrandenburg, Germany

Janssen & Bechly Bierbrauerei
- Interactive map of Janssen & Bechly Bierbrauerei
- Location: Neubrandenburg, Germany
- Opened: 1911
- Closed: 1995
- Other products: Bochbier, Edelbrau, Kronenbrau, Malzbier, Pilsner, Tafelbier
- Owner: Hans Janssen, Friedrich Bechly

Janssen & Bechly Brewery produced beer at Neubrandenburg, Germany from 1912 until the company was nationalized by East Germany in 1949. The brewery continued to produce beer under the Neubrandenburg and Nordbräu brand names until the company ended production in 1995. The Nordbräu brand was sold to the Mecklenburg brewery Lübzer in 1996.

== History ==
The origin of the Janssen & Bechly Brewery began with an older Neubrandenburg brewery established by Franz Moncke in 1847 and purchased by Friedrich Bechly about 1900. Franz Moncke's brewery was located on Treptower Strasse, Neubrandenburg, and was popular for its Bavarian style bottom-fermenting beer. Friedrich and Hans Janssen owned another brewery on Badstuberstrabe in Rostock, Germany. The entrepreneurs joined efforts and founded the Janssen & Bechly Brewery at Neubrandenburg in 1911. A new brewery constructed at 49 Demminer Street, Neubrandenburg was opened in 1912. The Janssen & Bechly Brewery was established as an Aktiengesellschaft (joint-stock company) on January 25, 1922; capitalized with 1100 bearer shares of 1000 marks each. Capital was increased in 1923, and the stock was split 5:1 on January 13, 1925. Capital was increased again in 1941, but due to the impact of World War II the last annual meeting of the company was August 12, 1943. The company was nationalized in 1949 as a Volkseigener Betrieb (state-owned operation) and renamed VEB Brauerei Neubrandenburg, producing beer under the Neubrandenburg brand name. The company was later reformed as VEB Nordbräu Neubrandenburg and produced beer under the Nordbräu brand name. Following German reunification in 1990, the brewery was sold to private investor Peter Roth in 1991, and subsequently failed, closing business in 1995. The Nordbräu brand was sold for 8 million Marks to Mecklenburg brewery Lübzer in 1996. The original brewery building on Demminer Street, which had stood for nearly 100 years, was demolished in 2009 to make way for a shopping center. Only the capstone showing the brewery logo was saved.

== Beer types produced ==
The Janssen & Bechly Brewery has been known to produce Bockbier, Edelbrau, Kronenbrau, Malzbier, Pilsner, Tafelbier, and Weiberbock styles of beer.

== Memorabilia ==
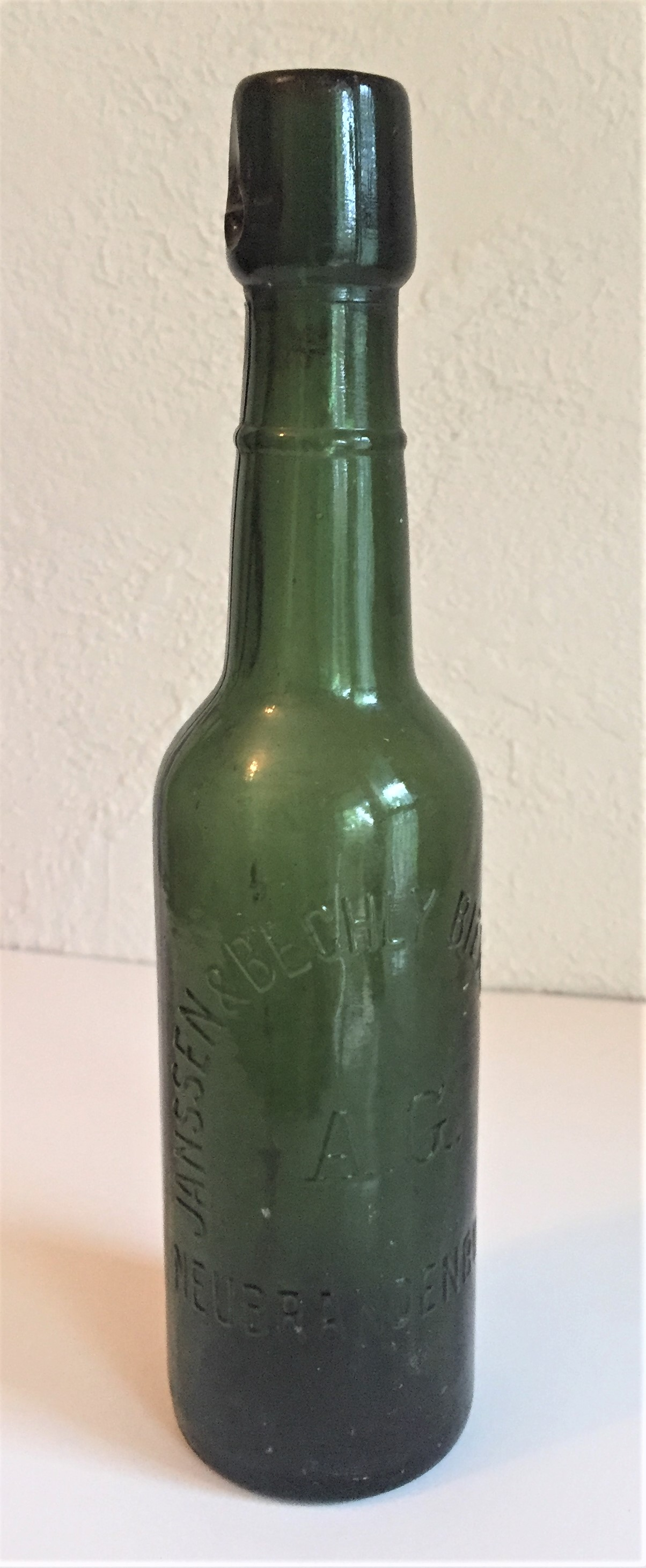
Janssen & Bechly beer bottle

The types of historical items available to collectors include bottles & caps, bar coasters, metal signs and stock certificates.

== See also ==
- Brewery
- Microbrewery
- Beer in Germany
