= Dunkel =

Dark German lager

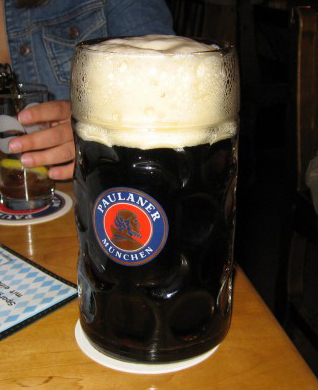
Paulaner Dunkel

Dunkel (German: [ˌdʊŋkl̩]), or Dunkles (German: [ˈdʊŋkləs]), is a word used for several types of dark German lager. Dunkel is the German word meaning "dark", and dunkel beers typically range in color from amber to dark reddish brown. They are characterized by their smooth, malty flavor. In informal terms, such as when ordering at a bar, "dunkel" is likely to mean whatever dark beer the bar has on tap, or sells most of; in much of north and western Germany, especially near Düsseldorf, this may be Altbier.

In Bavaria, dunkel, along with helles, is a traditional style brewed in Munich and popular throughout Bavaria. With alcohol concentrations of 4.5% to 6.0% by volume, dunkels are weaker than doppelbocks, another traditional dark Bavarian beer. Dunkels are produced using Munich malts, which give the dunkel its color. Other malts or flavors may also be added.

Many dunkels have a distinctive malty flavor that comes from a special brewing technique called decoction mashing. Most commonly, dunkel beers are dark lagers, but the term is also used to refer to dark wheat beers such as Franziskaner Hefe-Weisse Dunkel. Dunkel weizen is another term used to refer to dark wheat beers, which are fruity and sweet with more dark, roasted malts than their lighter counterpart, the hefeweizen.

== Munich dunkel ==
Dunkels were the original style of the Bavarian villages and countryside, and it was the most common style at the time of the introduction of the Reinheitsgebot (1516). As such, it is the first "fully codified and regulated" beer. Its ABV is rarely higher than 5.5%, and it has low bitterness, a distinctive dark color, and a malty flavor. Dunkel is brewed using lager yeasts.

Lighter-colored lagers were not common until the later part of the 19th century when technological advances made them easier to produce.

== Franconian dunkel ==
Dunkel is also widespread in parts of Franconia, for example the Franconian Switzerland, where it has been originally the most common beer type. The region has a lot of microbreweries, of which many still produce Dunkel. One Example is Weissenohe Abbey Brewery (Weissenoher Klosterbrauerei).

== Examples ==
- Aktienbrauerei Kaufbeuren Dunkel
- Andechser Dunkel
- Augustiner Dunkel
- Ayinger Altbairisch Dunkel
- Dunkel Fester A dunkel-style beer brewed in the UK by the Wychwood Brewery
- Erdinger Dunkel
- Franconia Brewing Company German Dunkel
- Hacker-Pschorr Münchner Dunkel
- Hofbräu München Dunkel
- König Ludwig Dunkel
- Löwenbräu Dunkel
- Paulaner Original Münchner Dunkel
- Spaten München Dunkel
- Warsteiner Premium Dunkel
- Weihenstephaner Tradition Bayrisch Dunkel
- Weltenburg Abbey Weltenburger Kloster Barock Dunkel

== See also ==
- Doppelbock
- German beer
- Helles
- Schwarzbier
