= Maisel Brau Bamberg =

Former brewery company

Maisel Bräu Bamberg was a brewery founded in 1894 in Bamberg, Bavaria, Germany . They closed in 2008.

== Beer ==
The brewery produced a range of beers including Maisel Kellerbier and Maisel Eine Bamberger Weisse.
