= Familienbrauerei Bauhöfer =

Brewery company in Renchen-Ulm, Germany

Coordinates: 48.58037°N 8.04819°E

Familienbrauerei Bauhöfer GmbH & Co. KG ("Bauhöfer Family Brewery) is a brewery company in Renchen-Ulm, Baden-Württemberg, Germany, established in 1852.

The company is a Gesellschaft mit beschränkter Haftung (GmbH, limited liability company) and a Kommanditgesellschaft (KG, limited partnership).

== Beers ==
The company produces a range of beers, some seasonal, including (with ABV)

- Null Komma Ulmer (2.5)
- Ulmer Colaweizen (2.7)
- Ulmer Export (5.4)
- Ulmer Hefeweizen Dunkel (5.1)
- Ulmer Hefeweizen Hell (5.1)
- Ulmer Hexensud (4.8)
- Ulmer Keller No. 5 (5.3)
- Ulmer Kristallweizen (5.1)
- Ulmer Maibock (7.2)
- Ulmer Marzenbier (?)
- Ulmer Mauritius Eisbock Edition 2013 (9.9)
- Ulmer Oktobergold (5.9)
- Ulmer Pilsener (5.2)
- Ulmer Radler (2.7)
- Ulmer Sportweizen (?)
- Ulmer Vollmondbier (5.2)
- Ulmer Winterbock (7.4)
