= Privatbrauerei Hofmühl =

Brewery in Germany

Privatbrauerei Hofmühl GmbH
- Interactive map of Privatbrauerei Hofmühl GmbH
- Location: Eichstätt, Bavaria, Germany
- Coordinates: 48°53′37″N 11°10′5″E
- Opened: 1492
- Key people: Wilhelm von Reichenau
- Annual production volume: 85,000 hectolitres (72,000 US bbl)
- Employees: 60
- Website: hofmuehl.de

Privatbrauerei Hofmühl is the sole brewery located in Eichstätt, Germany.

The brewery was founded in 1492 by Wilhelm von Reichenau. Hofmühl is recognized as an eco-friendly brewery and saves about 60% of its yearly energy consumption through the "Merlin" beer technique and solar energy. Among the awards that Hofmühl's beers have received are the Golden DLG Prize (awarded yearly) and the Bayerischer Energiepreis 2008 for solar technology. The brewery is particularly well known for its Hefeweizen and Helles.
