= Beer in Germany =

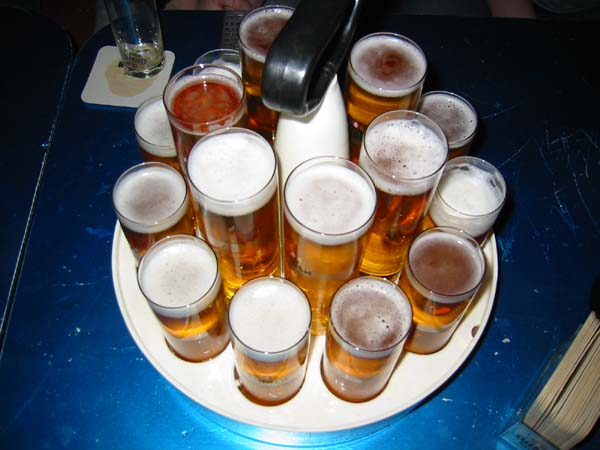
A Kranz (wreath) of fresh Kölsch beer that is typically carried by a server ("Köbes"), containing traditional Stange glasses and, in the center, larger modern glasses

Beer (German: Bier, pronounced [biːɐ̯]) is a major part of German culture. According to the Reinheitsgebot (German beer purity law), only water, hops, yeast and malt are permitted as ingredients in its production. Beers not exclusively using barley-malt, such as wheat beer, must be top-fermented.

In 2023, Germany ranked fourth in beer exports and in 2020, Germany ranked third in Europe in terms of per-capita beer consumption, trailing behind the Czech Republic and Austria.

== Styles ==
=== Pale lagers ===
- Pilsener is a pale lager with a light body and a more prominent hop character, is the most popular style, holding around two-thirds of the market. It has an alcohol content of 4.5–5% ABV and 11–12° Plato.
- Märzen is a medium-bodied, malty lager that comes in pale, amber, and dark varieties. 13–14° Plato, 5.2–6% ABV. This type of beer is traditionally served at the Munich Oktoberfest.
- Export is a pale lager brewed around Dortmund, and is fuller, maltier, and less hoppy than Pilsner. 12–12.5° Plato, 5–5.5% ABV. Germany's most popular style in the 1950s and 1960s, it is now becoming increasingly rare.
- Helles is a malty pale lager from Bavaria of 11–12° Plato, 4.5–5% ABV.
- Maibock is a pale, strong lager brewed in the spring. 16–17° Plato, 6.5–7% ABV.
- Spezial is a pale, full, bitter-sweet, and delicately hopped lager. 13–13.5° Plato, 5.5–5.7% ABV.

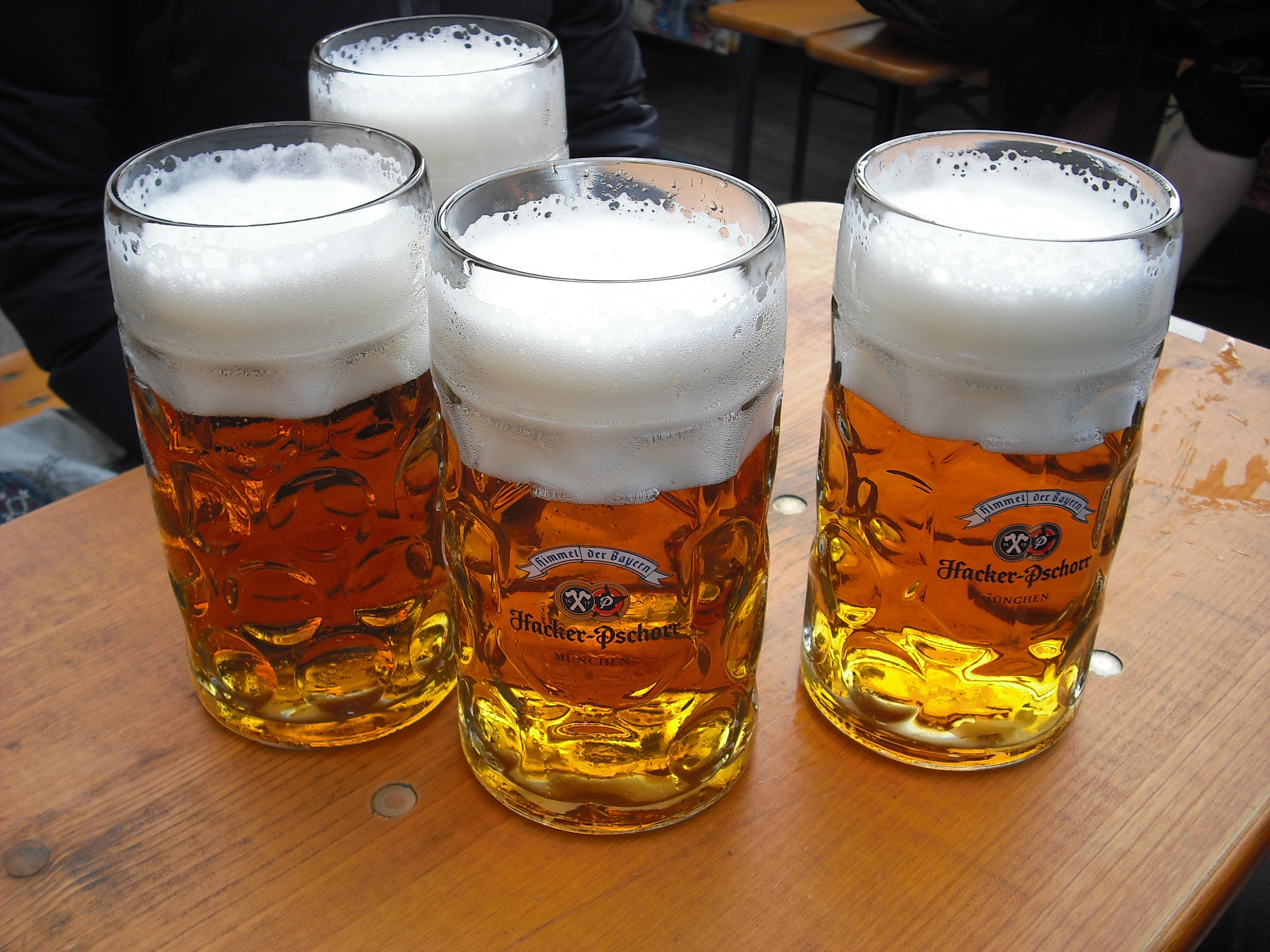
Märzen at Oktoberfest, served in the traditional 1-litre Maß

=== Dark lagers ===
- Bock is a heavy-bodied, bitter-sweet lager that uses dark-coloured malts. 16–17° Plato, 6.5–7% ABV.
- Doppelbock is a very strong, very full-bodied lager that uses dark-coloured malts. 18–28° Plato, 8–12% ABV.
- Dunkel is a dark lager made in two main varieties, the sweetish, malty Munich style and the drier, hoppy Franconian style.
- Schwarzbier is a bottom-fermented, black lager beer. 11–12° Plato, 4.5–5% ABV.

=== Wheat beers ===
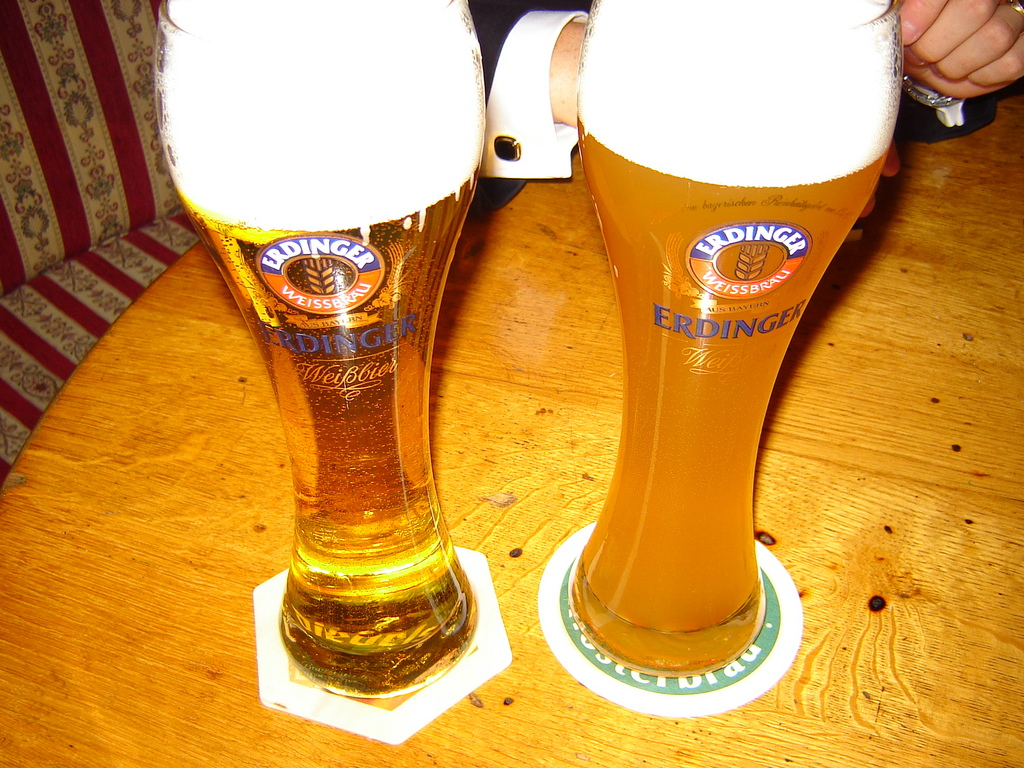
Filtered and unfiltered German wheat beers

- Weizenbier and Weißbier are the standard German names for wheat beer – Weizen is German for "wheat", and weiß is German for "white".
- Dunkelweizen is a dark wheat beer.
- Hefeweizen is an unfiltered wheat beer. Hefe is German for yeast.
- Kristallweizen is a filtered wheat beer, characterized by a clear appearance as opposed to the cloudy look of a typical Hefeweizen.
- Weizenbock is the name for a strong beer or bock made with wheat. 16–17° Plato, 6.5–8% ABV.

=== Regional and local styles ===
- Altbier is a top-fermented, lagered beer. It is brewed only in Düsseldorf and the Lower Rhine region. Its origins lie in Westphalia, and a few Altbier breweries are still in this region. Tastes range from mildly bitter and hoppy to exceptionally bitter. About 10 breweries in the Düsseldorf region brew Altbier at 5–6.5% ABV.
- Berliner Weisse is a pale, very sour, wheat beer brewed in Berlin. 9° Plato, 2.5–5% ABV. The beer is typically served with raspberry- or woodruff-flavoured syrup.
- Gose is a sour wheat beer brewed with salt and coriander in Leipzig.
- Kellerbiers are unfiltered lagers conditioned in a similar manner to cask ales. Strength and colour vary, though in the Franconia region where these cask-conditioned lagers are still popular, the strength tends to be 5% ABV or slightly higher, and the colour tends to be a deep amber, but the defining characteristic is the cask conditioning. Kellerbier is German for "cellar beer".
- Kölsch is a pale, light-bodied, top-fermented beer, which when brewed in Germany, can only legally be brewed in the Cologne region. 11–12° Plato, 4.5–5% ABV.
- Münchener Bier is a beer from Munich that is protected under EU law with PGI status, first published under relevant laws in 1998. This designation was one of six German beers registered with the PGI designation at the time.
- Rauchbier is a smoked beer brewed in Bamberg in Upper Franconia.
- Roggenbier is a fairly dark beer made in Bavaria with rye, somewhat grainy in flavour similar to bread, 4.5–6% ABV.
- Zwickelbier was originally a sample amount of beer taken by a brewery boss from the barrel with the help of a special pipe called a Zwickelhahn. Zwickelbiers are unfiltered lagers like Kellerbiers, though with a slightly different conditioning process, which gives the lager more carbonation. Zwickelbiers tend to be younger, lower in alcohol, and less hoppy than Kellerbiers.
- Zoiglbier is brewed communally in the Upper Palatinate in eastern Bavaria and advertised outside houses with a Zoiglstern sign — a six-pointed blue-and-white symbol made from wooden slats, similar to a Star of David.

== Breweries ==
While the beer market is weaker but more centralized in northern Germany, southern Germany has many smaller, local breweries. Almost half of all German breweries are in Bavaria, where the seven main breweries produce 158 million US gal (6.0 million hl) annually. 5,000 different beer types are produced across 1,500 breweries in Destination Germany. Half of this number is found in Bavaria.

The highest density of breweries in the world is found in Aufseß near the city of Bamberg, in the Franconia region of Bavaria, with four breweries and only 1,352 citizens. The Benedictine abbey Weihenstephan brewery (established in 725) is reputedly the oldest existing brewery in the world (brewing since 1040). In 2004, Oettinger replaced Krombacher as the best selling brand in Germany.

Top ten best-selling German beer brands in million hectolitres
Brewery	Location	Output in 2012	Output in 2015
Oettinger	Oettingen	5.89	5.39
Krombacher	Kreuztal	5.46	5.49
Bitburger	Bitburg	4.07	3.84
Beck's	Bremen	2.78	2.59
Warsteiner	Warstein	2.77	2.34
Hasseröder	Wernigerode	2.75	2.25
Veltins	Meschede	2.72	2.79
Paulaner	Munich	2.30	2.42
Radeberger	Radeberg	1.91	1.90
Erdinger	Erding	1.72	1.80

Beer tax applies to the production or import of beer and beer-based mixed drinks. Exceptions include beer supplied free of charge by licensed breweries to employees and beer brewed by home or hobby brewers, up to 200 liters per calendar year.

== Alcohol content ==
The alcohol-by-volume, or ABV, content of beers in Germany is usually between 4.7% and 5.4% for most traditional brews. Bockbier or Doppelbock (double Bockbier) can have an alcohol content of up to 16%, making it stronger than many wines.

Children aged 14 to 15 may consume beverages containing up to 1.2% alcohol when accompanied by a parent or guardian. From age 16, they may purchase and consume such drinks without supervision. At 18, they are permitted to buy and consume all alcoholic beverages regardless of alcohol content.

== Drinkware ==
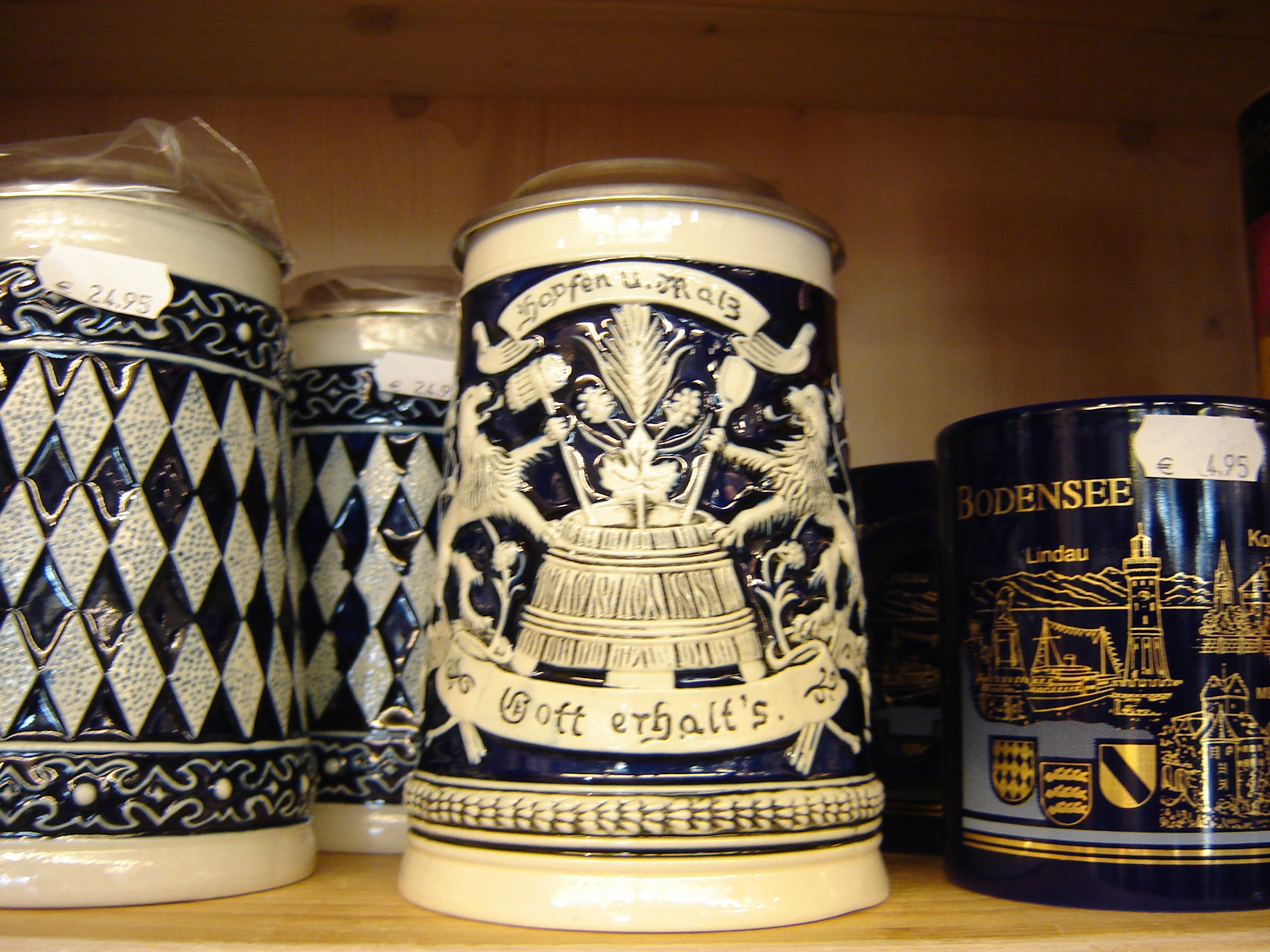
An ornate stoneware beer stein

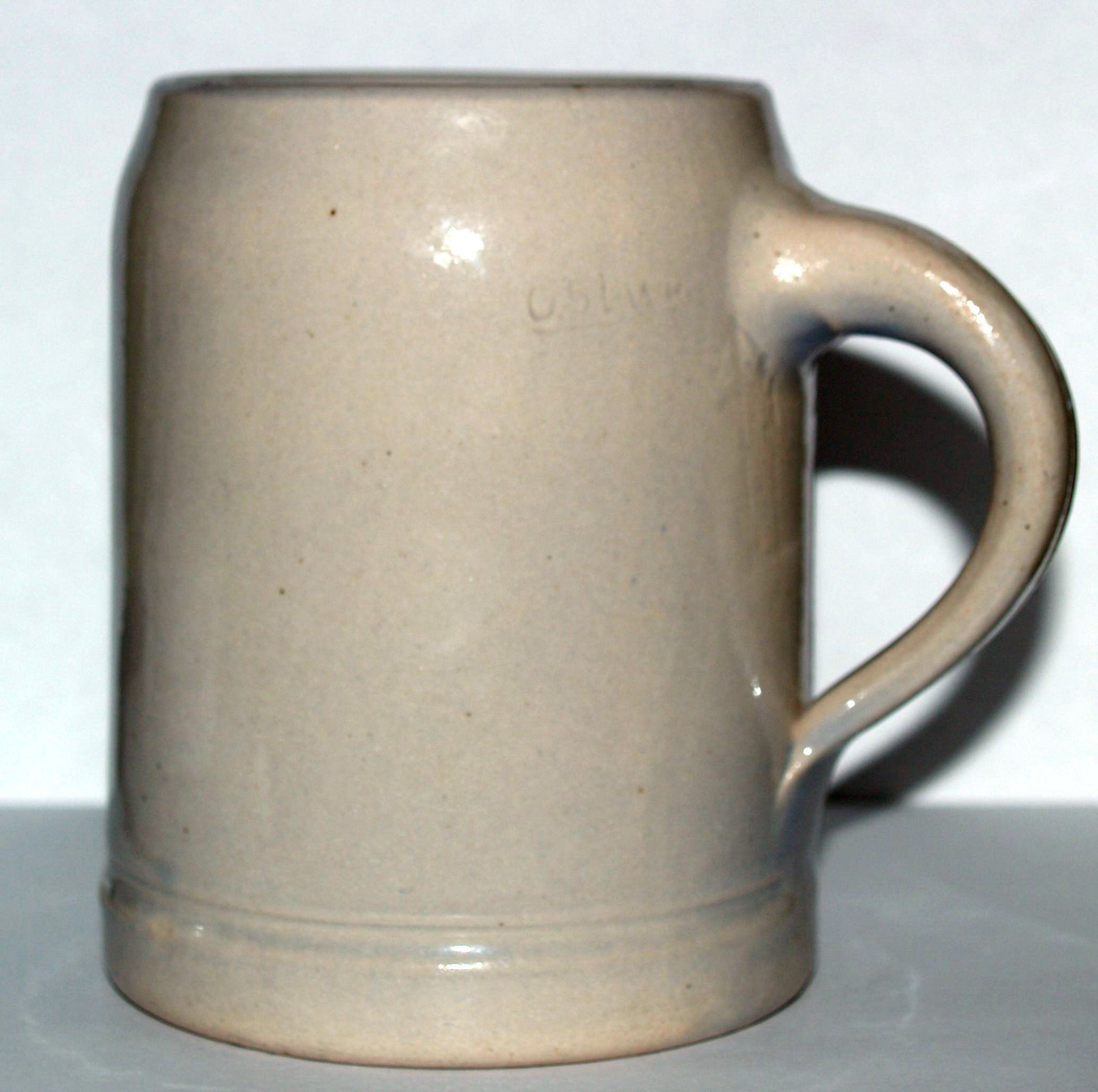
A common half-litre Humpen mug

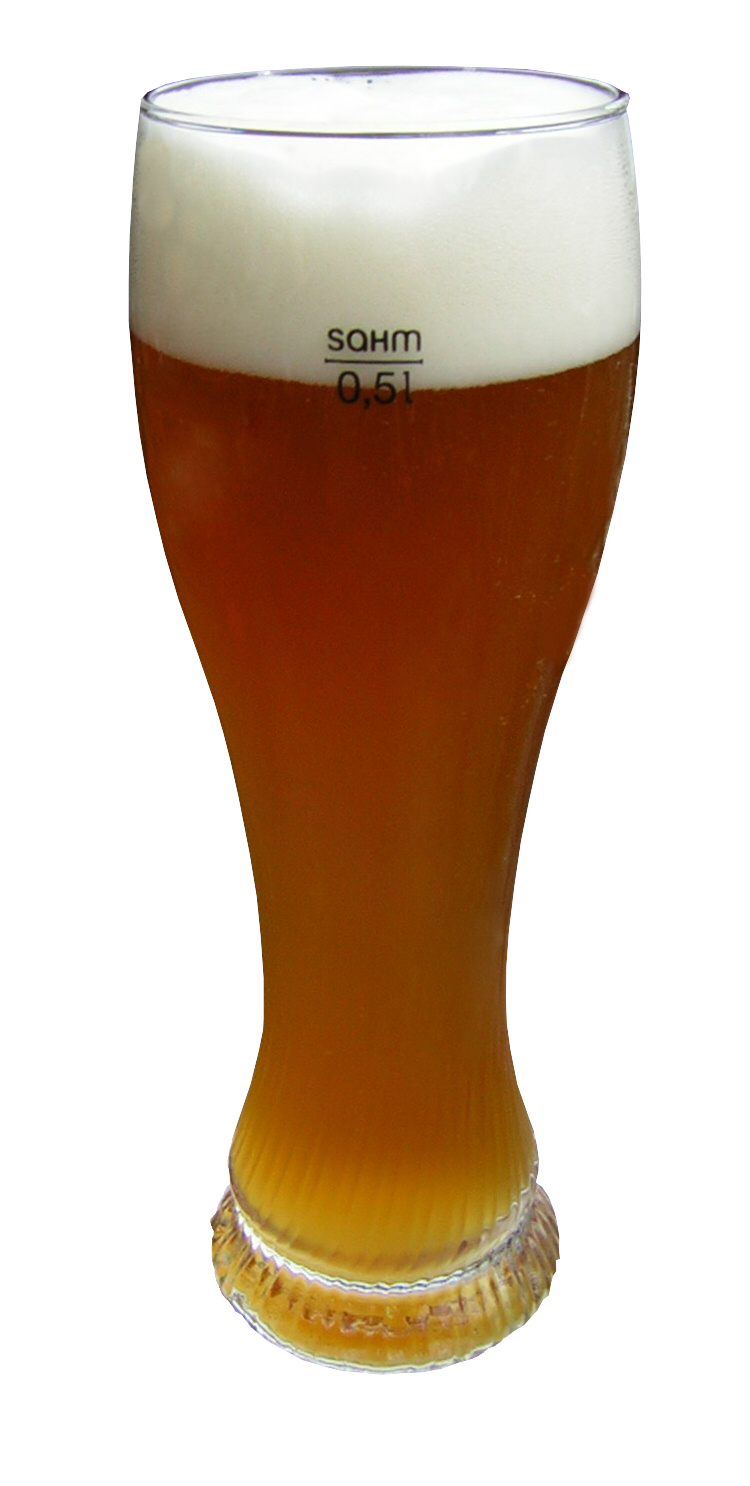
A Weizen beer glass

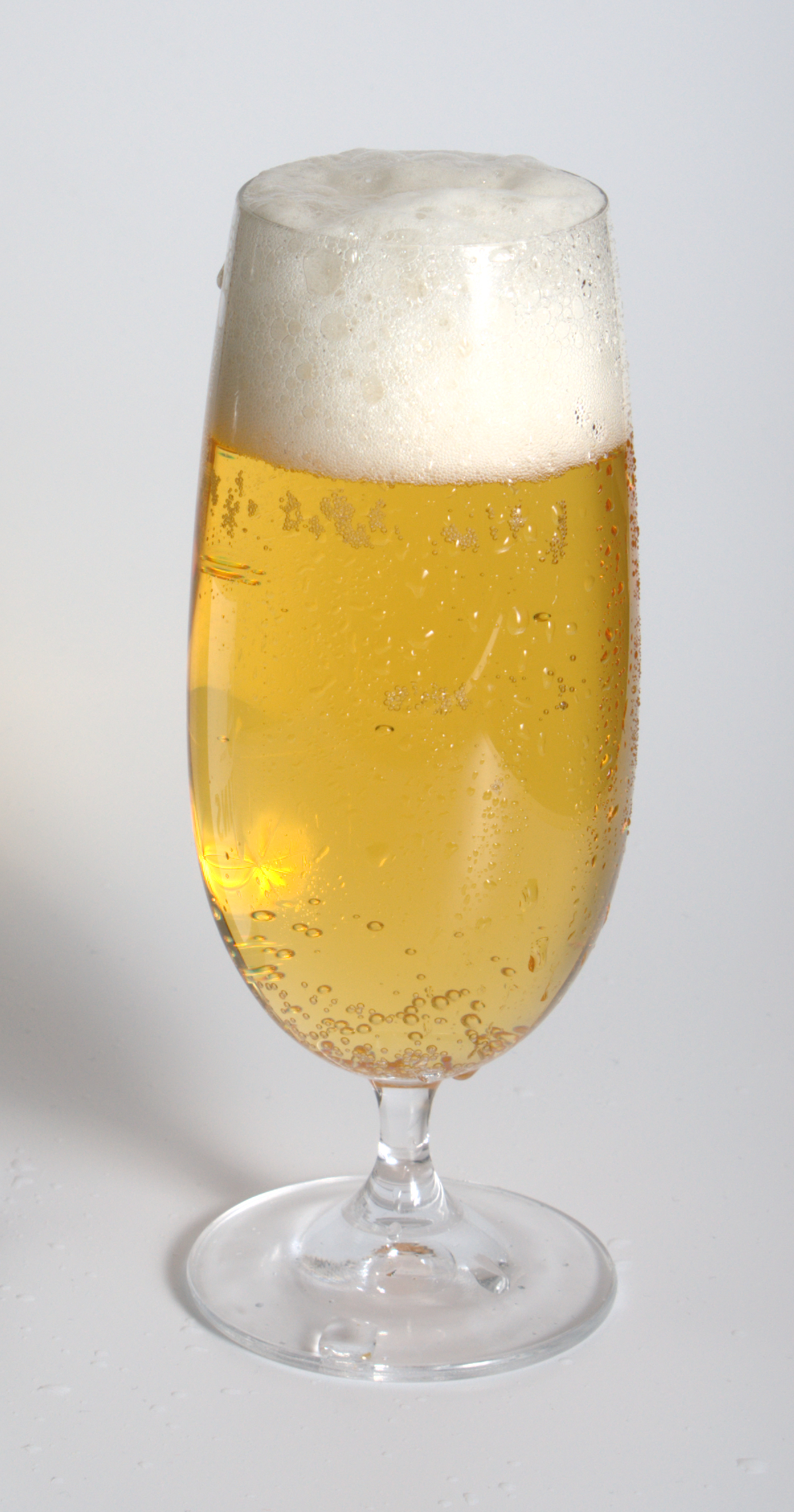
A German-style "Pilsner tulip" (Pilstulpe) glass

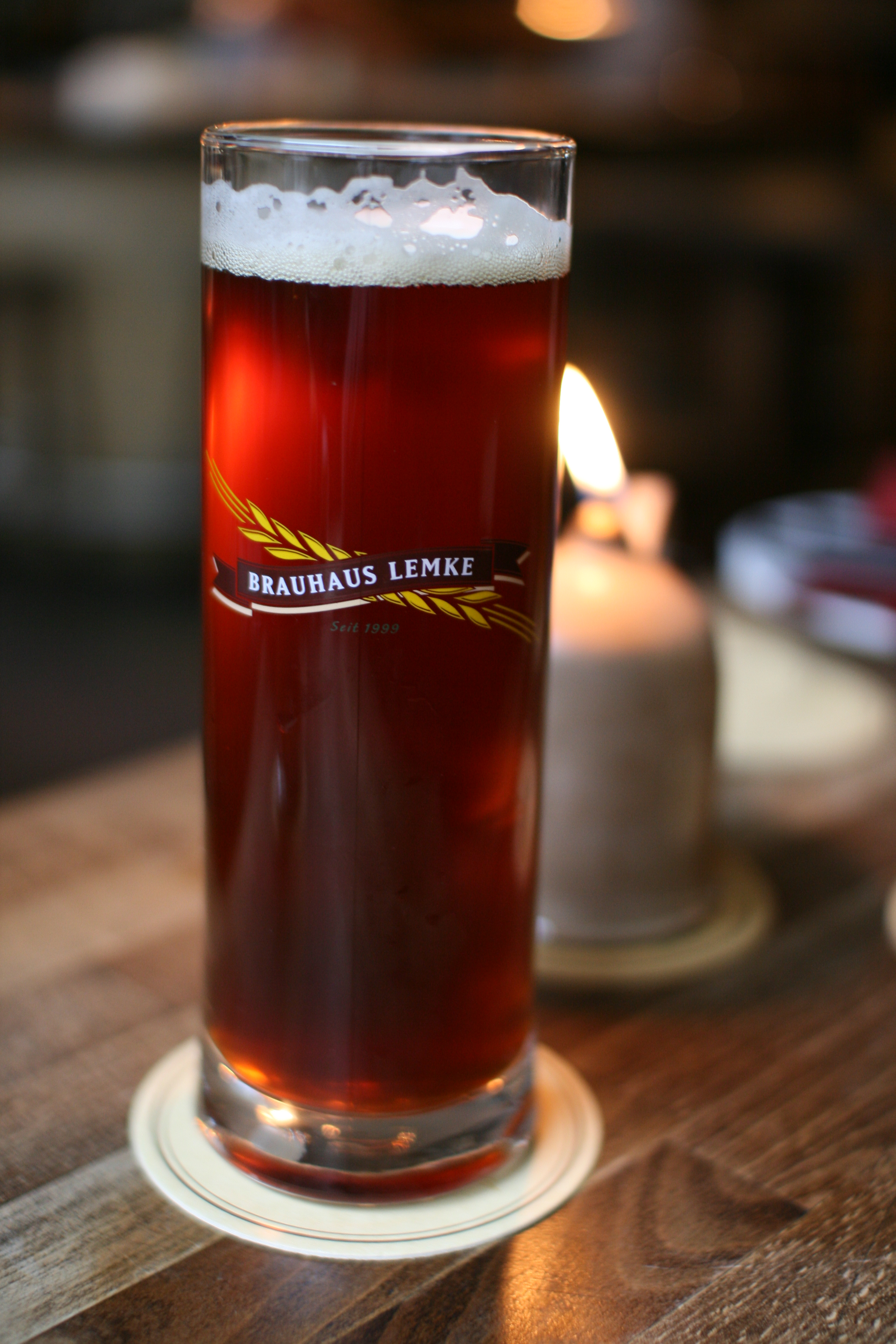
Dunkel, pictured here in a Stange glass

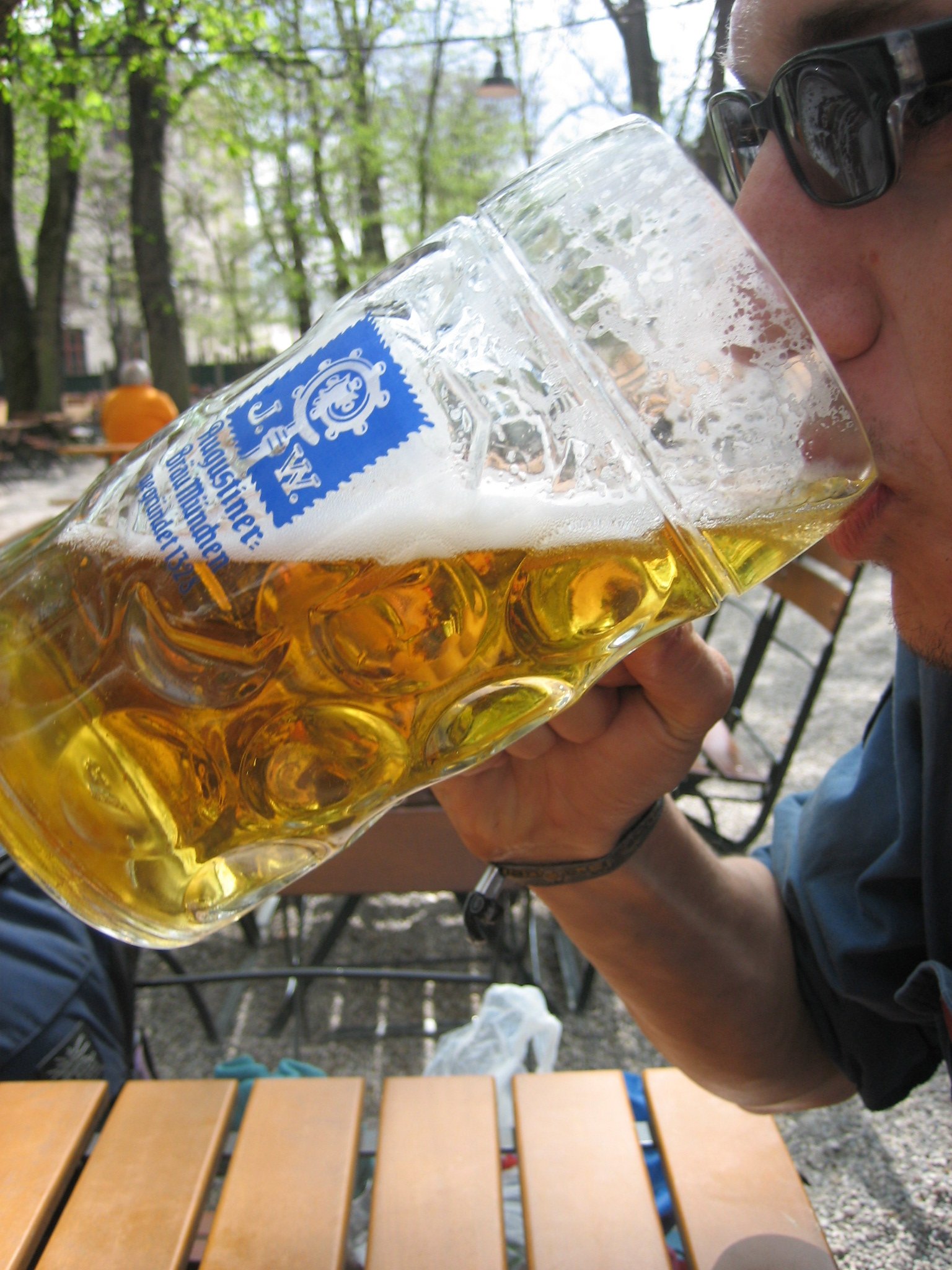
A Maßkrug is the style of glassware featured at German beer festivals, especially in Bavaria, such as Munich's Oktoberfest.

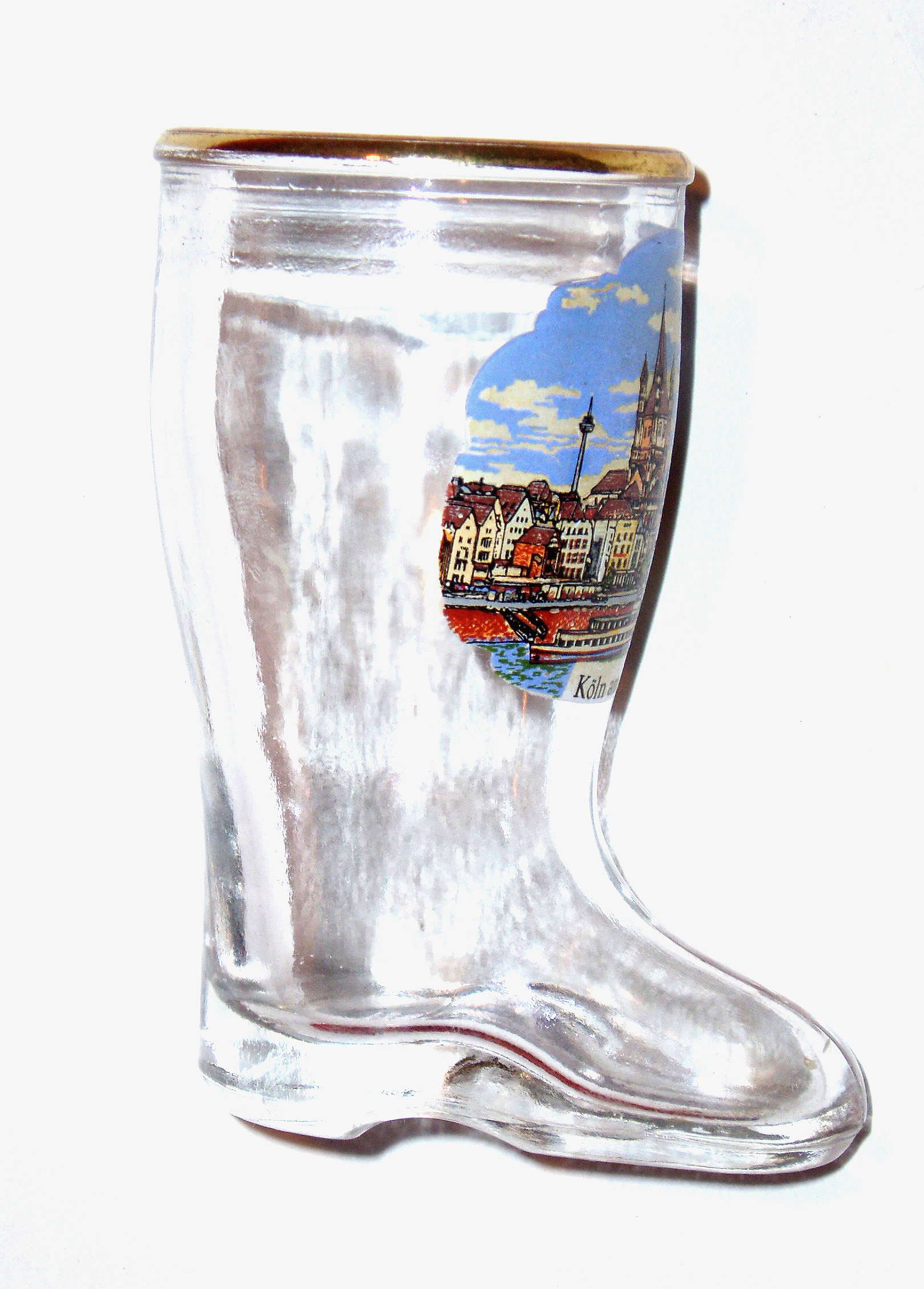
A German bierstiefel (beer boot)

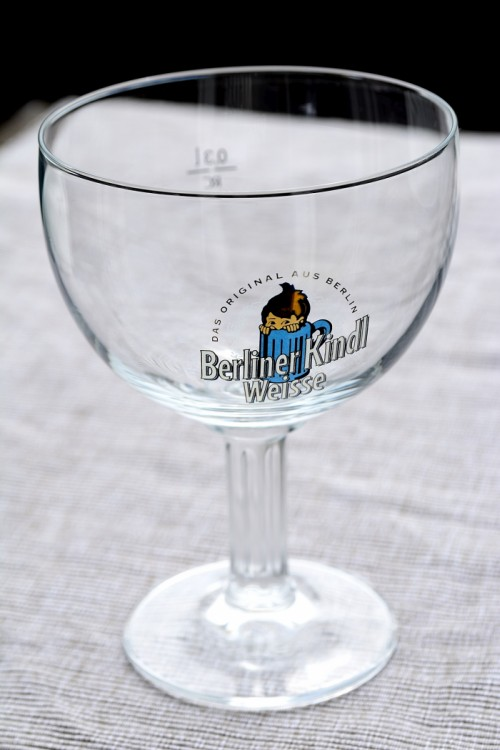
A Berliner Weisse glass

=== Weizen glass ===
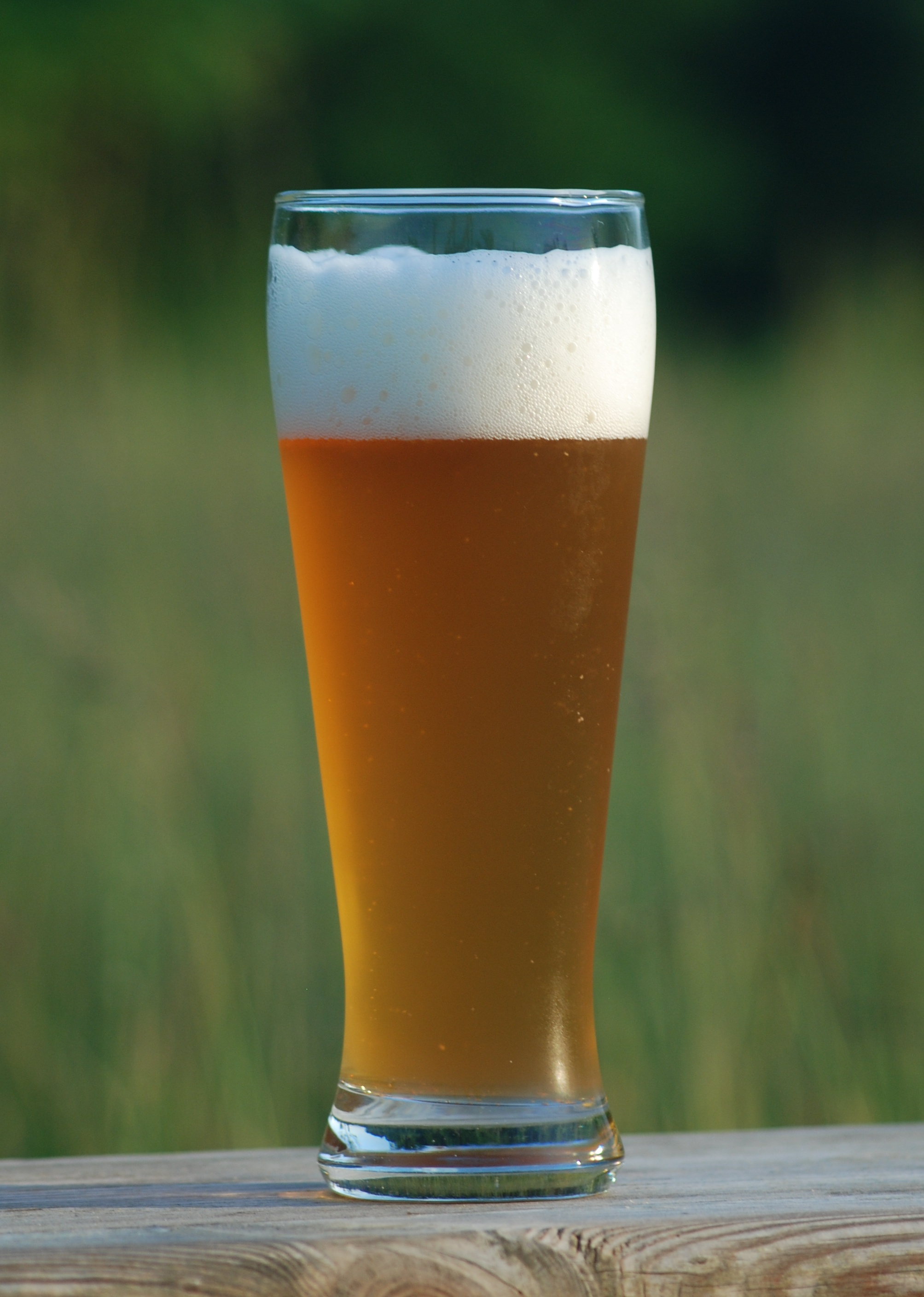
A glass of Weizen

A Weizen glass is used to serve wheat beer. Originating in Germany, the glass is narrow at the bottom and slightly wider at the top; the width both releasing aroma, and providing room for the often thick, fluffy heads produced by wheat beer. It tends to be taller than a pint glass, and generally holds 500 millilitres with room for foam or "head". In some countries, such as Belgium, the glass may be 250 ml or 330 ml.

Wheat beers tend to foam a lot, especially if poured incorrectly. A customary manner is to swirl around a bit of (preferably cold) water in the glass to wet it and afterwards pouring the beer slowly, holding the glass in an angle of approximately 45 °.

=== Beer stein ===
A beer stein (or simply a stein /ˈstaɪn/ STYNE) is an English neologism for a traditional type of beer mug. Steins may be made of stoneware (rarely the inferior earthenware), pewter, porcelain, silver, glass, or wood. They may have open tops or may have hinged pewter lids with a thumb-lever.

Steins usually come in sizes of a half-litre or full litre (or comparable historical sizes). Like decorative tankards, they are often decorated in nostalgic themes, generally showing allusions to Germany or Bavaria.

It is believed by some that the lid was implemented during the time of the Black Plague to prevent diseased flies from getting into the beer.

=== Maß ===
The Maß (pronounced [maːs]) is a term used in German-speaking countries for a unit of volume, now typically used only for measuring beer sold for immediate on-site consumption. In modern times, a Maß is defined as exactly 1 litre. As a Maß is a unit of measure, various designs are possible: modern Maßkrugs (Maßkrüge in German) are often handled glass tankards, although they may also be in the form of steins. At the Octoberfest beer is available in Maßkrug or half-litre 'Halb'.

=== Stange and Becher ===
A Stange (stick or rod) is a cylindrical glass that is traditionally used for Kölsch beer. A Becher (tumbler), traditionally used for Altbier, is similar to a Stange but is slightly shorter and much thicker. Stangen are carried by placing them into holes in a special tray called a Kranz (wreath). In Cologne Stanges are usually served by traditional waiters called Köbes.

=== Pilstulpe ===
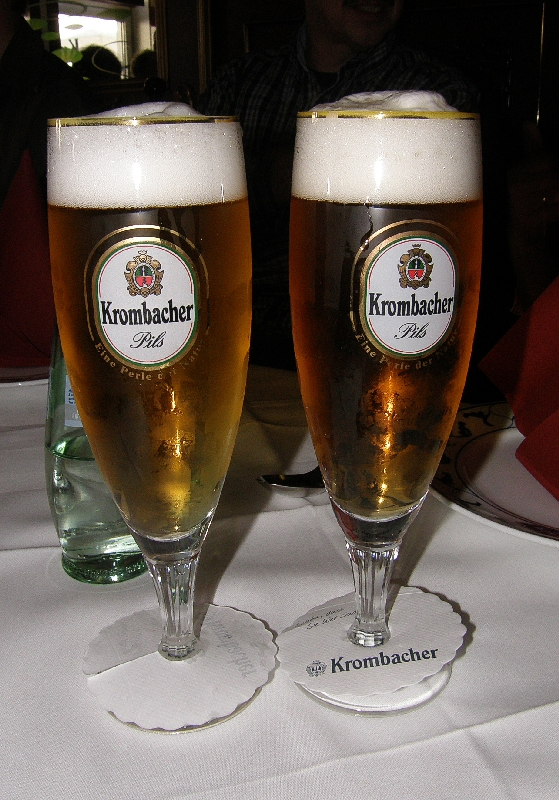
Traditional German Pilstulpen

The Pilstulpe ("Pilsner Tulip") or Biertulpe ("Beer tulip") is the traditional glass for German pilsner beers. Sizes are typically around 300 millilitres (11 imp fl oz; 10 US fl oz), but can be as large as 500 millilitres (18 imp fl oz; 17 US fl oz). When used in restaurant settings, a small piece of absorbent paper is placed around the base to absorb any drips from spilling or condensation.

=== Beer boot ===
Beer boots (Bierstiefel in German) have over a century of history and culture behind them. It is commonly believed that a general somewhere promised his troops to drink beer from his boot if they were successful in battle. When the troops prevailed, the general had a glassmaker fashion a boot from glass to fulfill his promise without tasting his own feet and to avoid spoiling the beer in his leather boot. Since then, soldiers have enjoyed toasting to their victories with a beer boot. At gatherings in Germany, Austria, and Switzerland, beer boots are often passed among the guests for a festive drinking challenge. Since the movie Beerfest appeared in 2006, beer boots have become increasingly popular in the United States. Glass beer boots are either manufactured using a mold or from mouth-blown glass by skilled artisans.

In Germany, beer boots usually contain between 2 and 4 litres and are passed from one guest at the table to the next one clockwise. When almost reaching the bottom of the boot, it suddenly starts bubbling. By some accounts, drinker who caused the bubbling has to order the next boot. There are also boots known with 6 and 8 litres. That being said, beer boots are almost never seen in Germany, even among friends who do drink as much and more beer on an evening out together; normal glasses are preferred. They are, however, very commonly used in drinking games in fraternities.

== Beer festivals ==
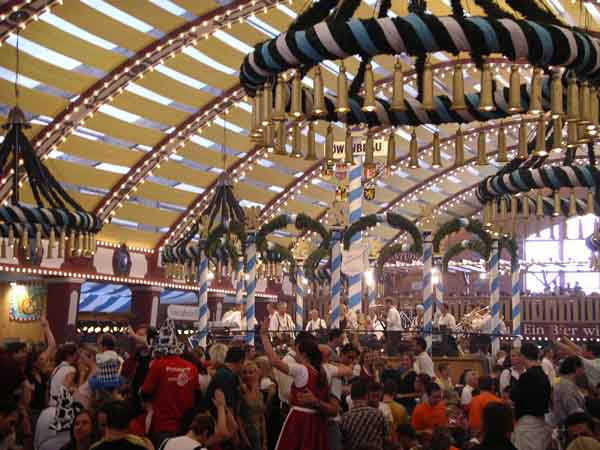
Inside a tent at Munich's Oktoberfest – the world's largest beer festival

Oktoberfest is a 16- to 18-day festival held annually in Munich, Bavaria, Germany, running from late September to the first weekend in October. Only beer which is brewed within the city limits of Munich with a minimum of 13.5% Stammwürze (approximately 6% alcohol by volume) is allowed to be served in this festival. Upon passing this criterion, a beer is designated Oktoberfest Beer. Large quantities of German beer are consumed, with almost 7 million liters served during the 16-day festival in 2007. In 2015 the festival officially served 7.3 million liters of beer.

Other festivals include

- The Cannstatter Volksfest in Stuttgart.
- The Gäubodenvolksfest in Straubing
- The Bergkirchweih in Erlangen
- The Hanover Schützenfest
- The Freimarkt in Bremen
- The Augsburger Plärrer in Augsburg
- The Nockherberg Starkbierfest in Munich
- The Volksfest in Pfaffenhofen

In many cases, the beer festival is part of a general funfair or volksfest.

== See also ==
- Beer and breweries by region
- List of brewing companies in Germany
- Reinheitsgebot, German Beer Purity Order
