= Erding =

- Town
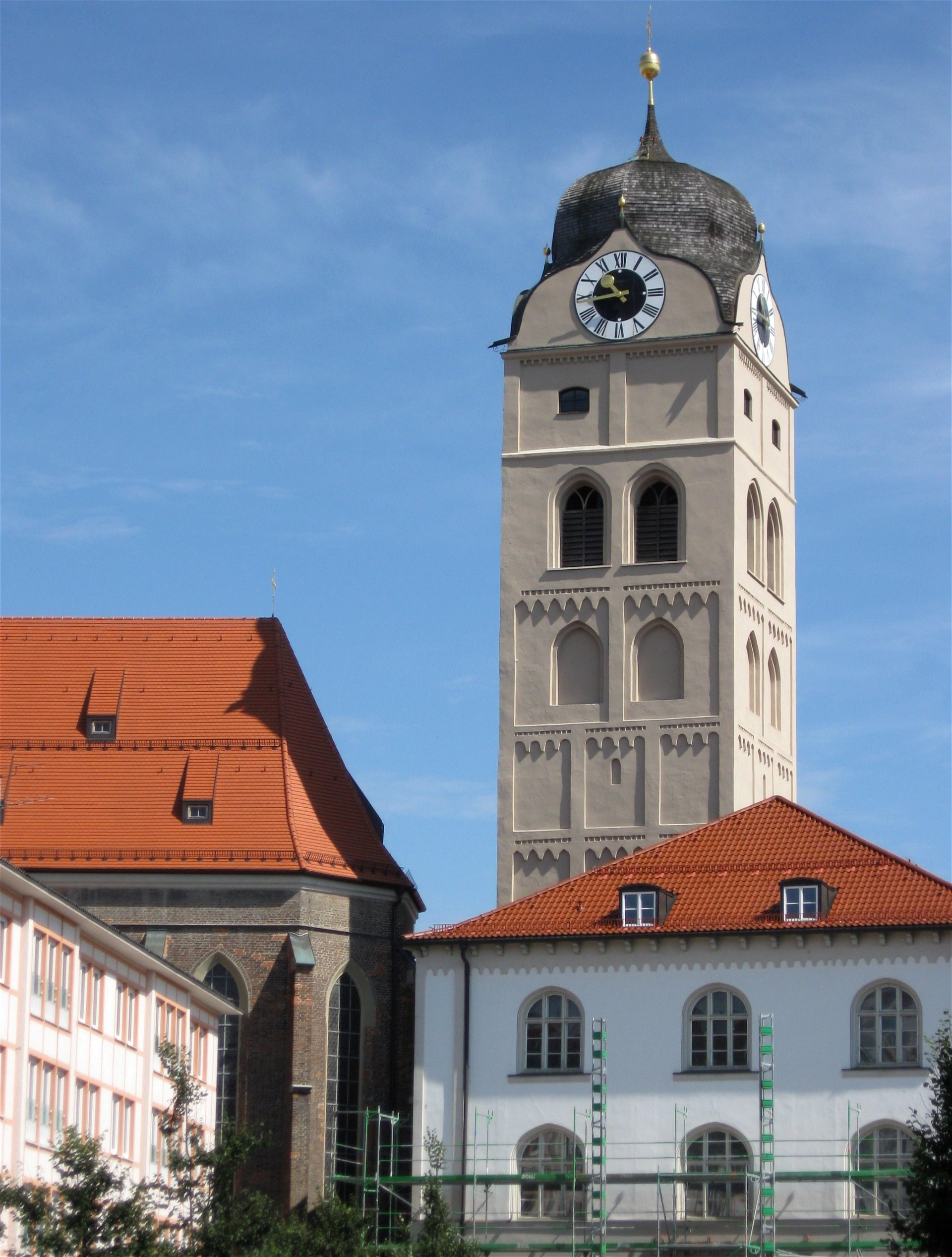
- The Schrannenhalle

- Coat of arms

- Location of Erding within Erding district
- Interactive map of Erding
- Location within Germany Location within Bavaria
- Coordinates: 48°17′N 11°54′E
- Country: Germany
- State: Bavaria
- Admin. region: Oberbayern
- District: Erding

Government
  - Mayor (2020–26): Maximilian Gotz (CSU)

Area
  - Total: 54.61 km^{2} (21.09 sq mi)
- Elevation: 463 m (1,519 ft)

Population (2025-12-31)
  - Total: 37,341
  - Density: 683.8/km^{2} (1,771/sq mi)
- Time zone: UTC+01:00 (CET)
  - Summer (DST): UTC+02:00 (CEST)
- Postal codes: 85435
- Dialling codes: 08122
- Vehicle registration: ED
- Website: www.erding.de

Erding (German pronunciation: [ˈeːɐ̯dɪŋ]) is a town in Bavaria, Germany, and capital of the rural district of the same name. It had a population of 36,469 in 2019.

The original Erdinger Weissbier is a well-known Bavarian specialty.

Erding is located around 31 kilometres northeast of central Munich, about a 30-minute drive by car. Regular S-Bahn trains connect to Munich and beyond.

== History ==
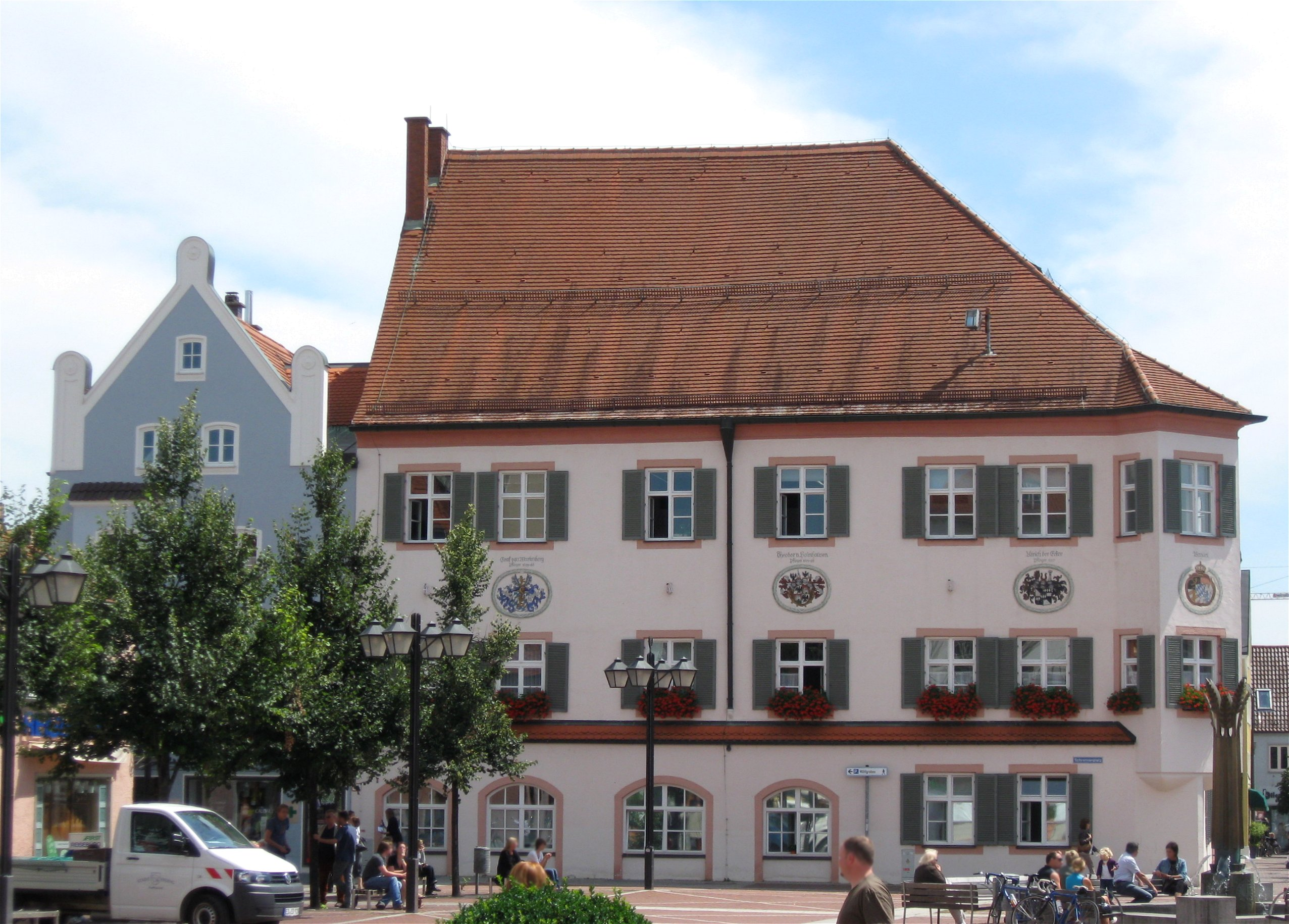
Town Hall

Evidence of prehistoric hunter/gatherers in the Erding area dates to c. 6000 BC: findings including an axe made of deer antler. Excavations of two dwellings of at least 6.5 metres in length near Altenerding from c. 2500 BC provide the first evidence of permanent agricultural based inhabitants, while some twenty early Bronze Age graveyards from c. 1800 BC have been found in Langenpreising.

Erding was founded in 1228–1230, developing as a township on an alternative route from Landshut to Munich. Erding became known as a border town, midway between the two rival cities. During the Thirty Years' War, Erding was taken twice by Swedish troops, who plundered it and set it on fire.

In 1945, several Allied air raids on the nearby military airport damaged the city and killed numerous inhabitants.

On March 24, 1950 three Douglas DC-3s from Czechoslovakia were simultaneously hijacked. All three planes landed in Erding, West Germany. 26 of 85 passengers stayed in West Germany to escape from Czechoslovakia's Communist regime.

In 1972 Erding was connected to Munich's S-Bahn network. In 1992 Munich Airport was opened; the decision to build a major airport on the ecologically sensitive Erdinger Moos [de] had been a source of controversy during the previous decade. The airport has attracted new businesses and additional population to the area.

== Economy ==
Farm fields surround Erding and large agricultural vehicles are a common sight on local roads. Local crops include corn for animal feed, wheat, sunflowers, carrots, white/red/blue/green cabbages, strawberries, kohlrabi, turnips, and sugar beet. Farm animals are normally kept in stables and are mostly limited to pigs, chickens and cows. Fish farming in privately owned lakes is also practised. Gardening is also practiced in Erding, but is limited by the relatively cool climate.

=== Local companies ===
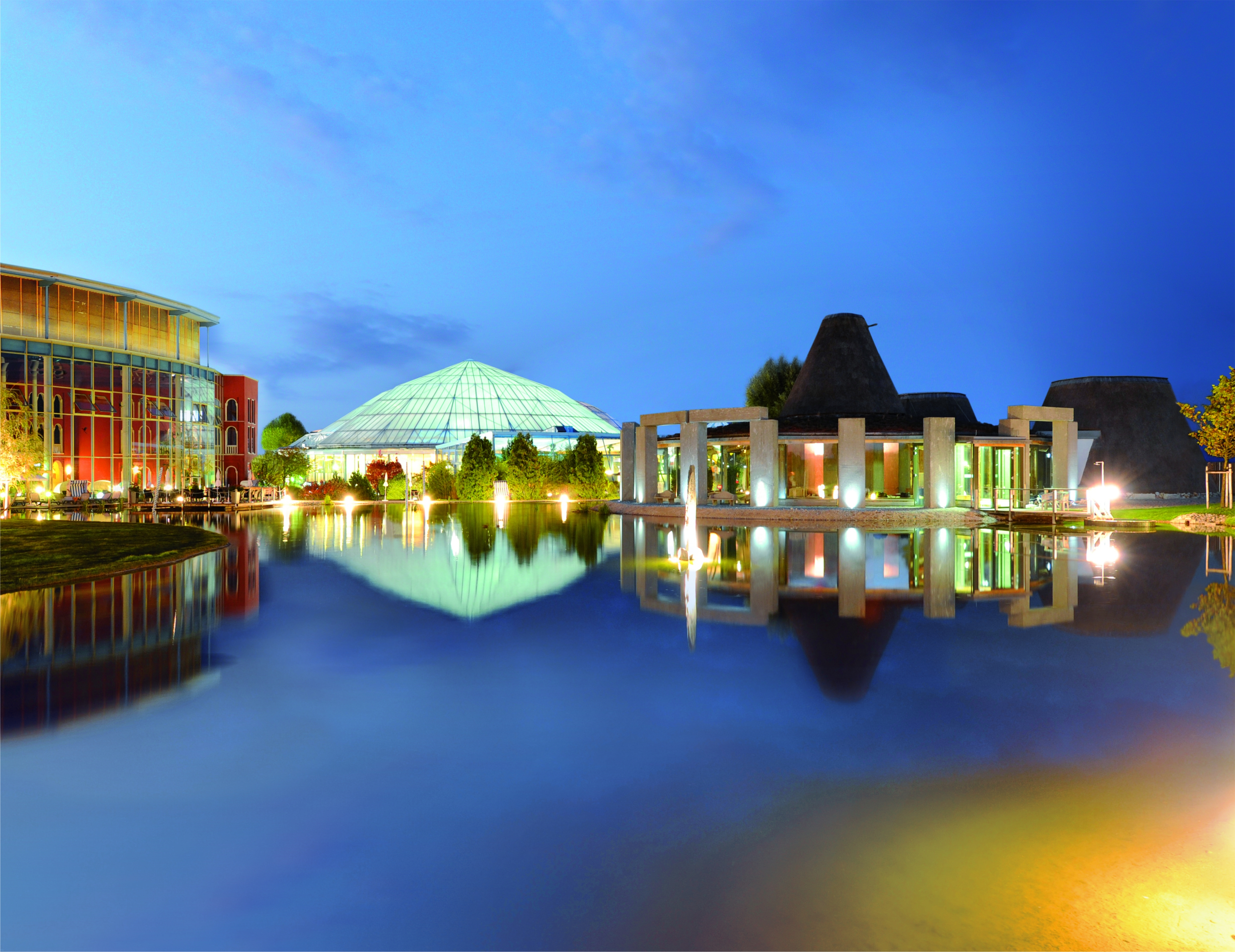
Wellness centre

- Erdinger brewery
- GLS, General Logistics Systems
- Therme Erding, wellness centre: with an area of 36 acres, the biggest thermal spa in the world
- Amadeus Data Processing, data center of the largest Global distribution system (GDS) provider in the worldwide travel and tourism industry.

== Twin towns – sister cities ==
Erding is twinned with:

- Bastia, France

== Notable people ==
- John Schrank (1876–1943), saloonkeeper, attempted to assassinate Theodore Roosevelt
- Volker Press (1939–1993), historian
- Dieter Brenninger (born 1944), footballer
- Albert Sigl (born 1953), writer, town clerk
- Ulrike Scharf (born 1967), politician (CSU)
- Philipp Bönig (born 1980), football player and manager
- Sebastian Bönig (born 1981), footballer
- Felix Schütz (born 1987), ice hockey player
- Sara Nuru (born 1989), fashion model and winner of the fourth season of Germany's Next Top Model
