= Oktoberfest tents =

Series of tents at the Oktoberfest

Coordinates: 48°07′59″N 11°33′29″E

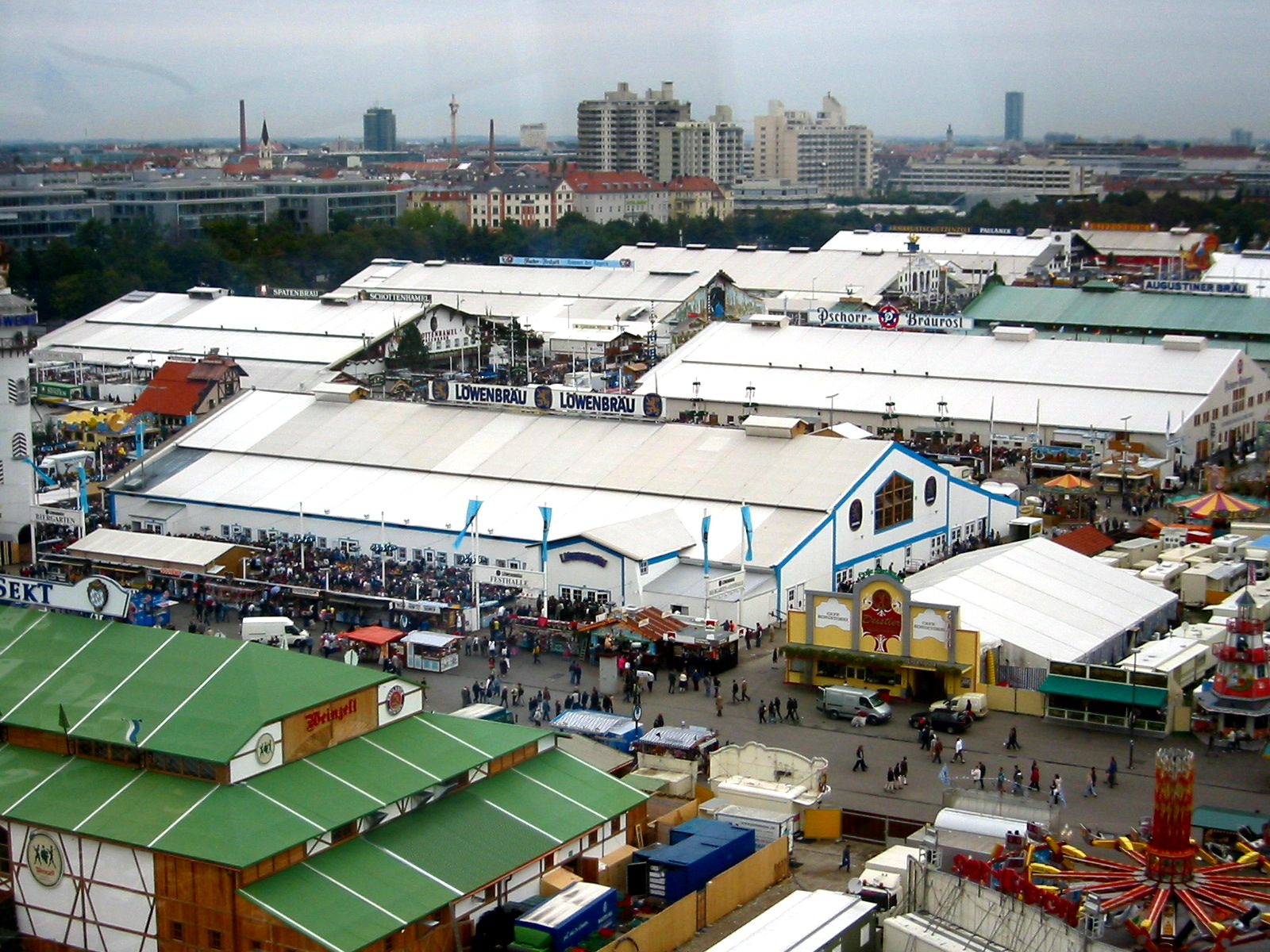
View of the tents from the Ferris wheel

The large festival tents at the Oktoberfest, often referred to as beer tents, are operated by individual Wiesn hosts, many of them long-established family businesses. Several tents are linked to Munich’s major breweries. Construction usually begins three months before the festival.

== Large tents ==
=== Armbrustschützenzelt ===
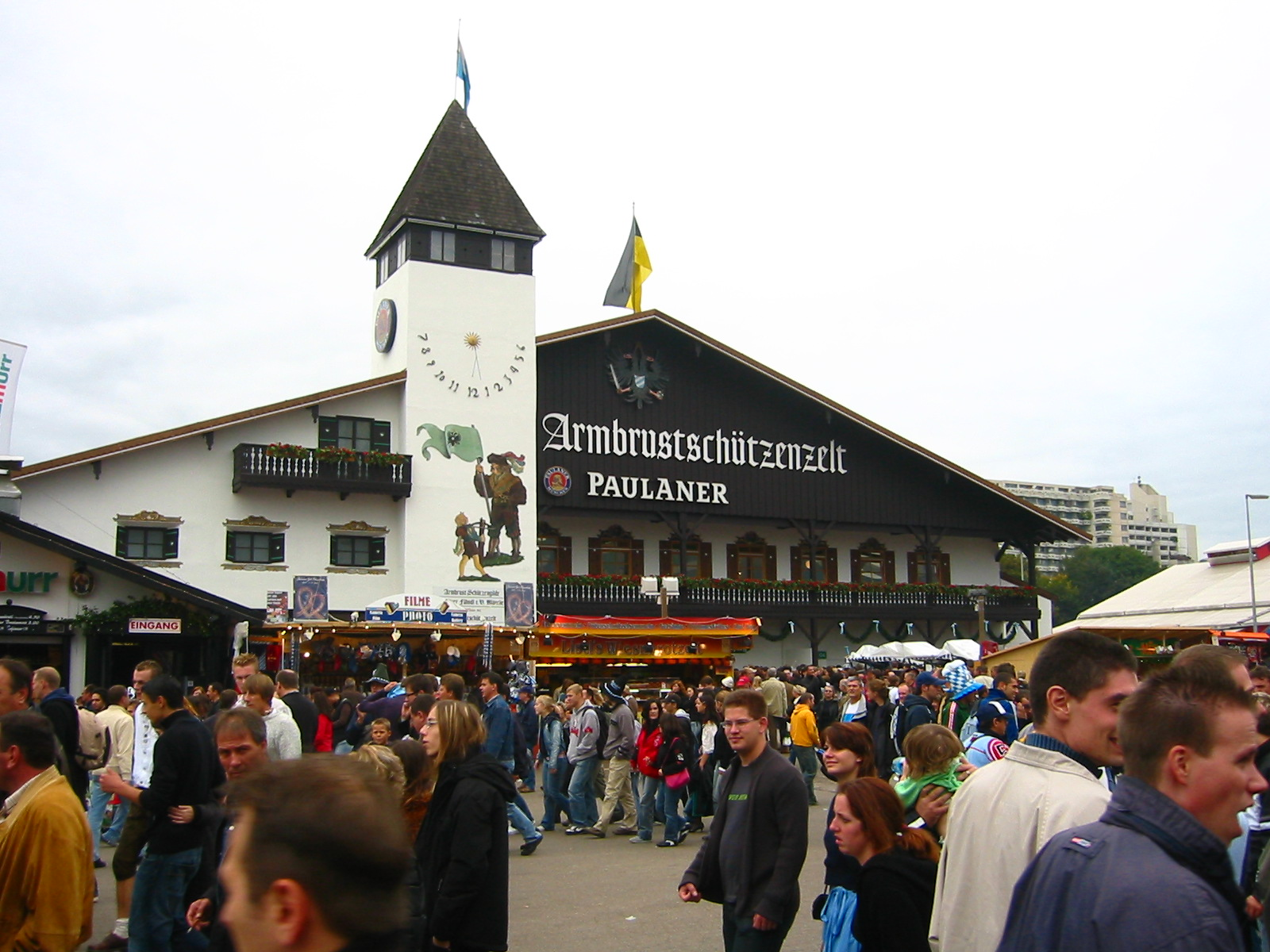
The Armbrustschützenzelt in 2005

The Armbrustschützenzelt (crossbowmen’s tent) was established in 1895. It provides 5,830 indoor seats and 1,620 outdoor seats. The Festwirt (tent operator) is Peter Inselkammer, brother of the owner of the Ayinger Brewery. The beer served comes from the Paulaner Brewery. The German Championship in the 30-metre national crossbow discipline is held annually in the tent.

=== Augustiner-Festhalle ===
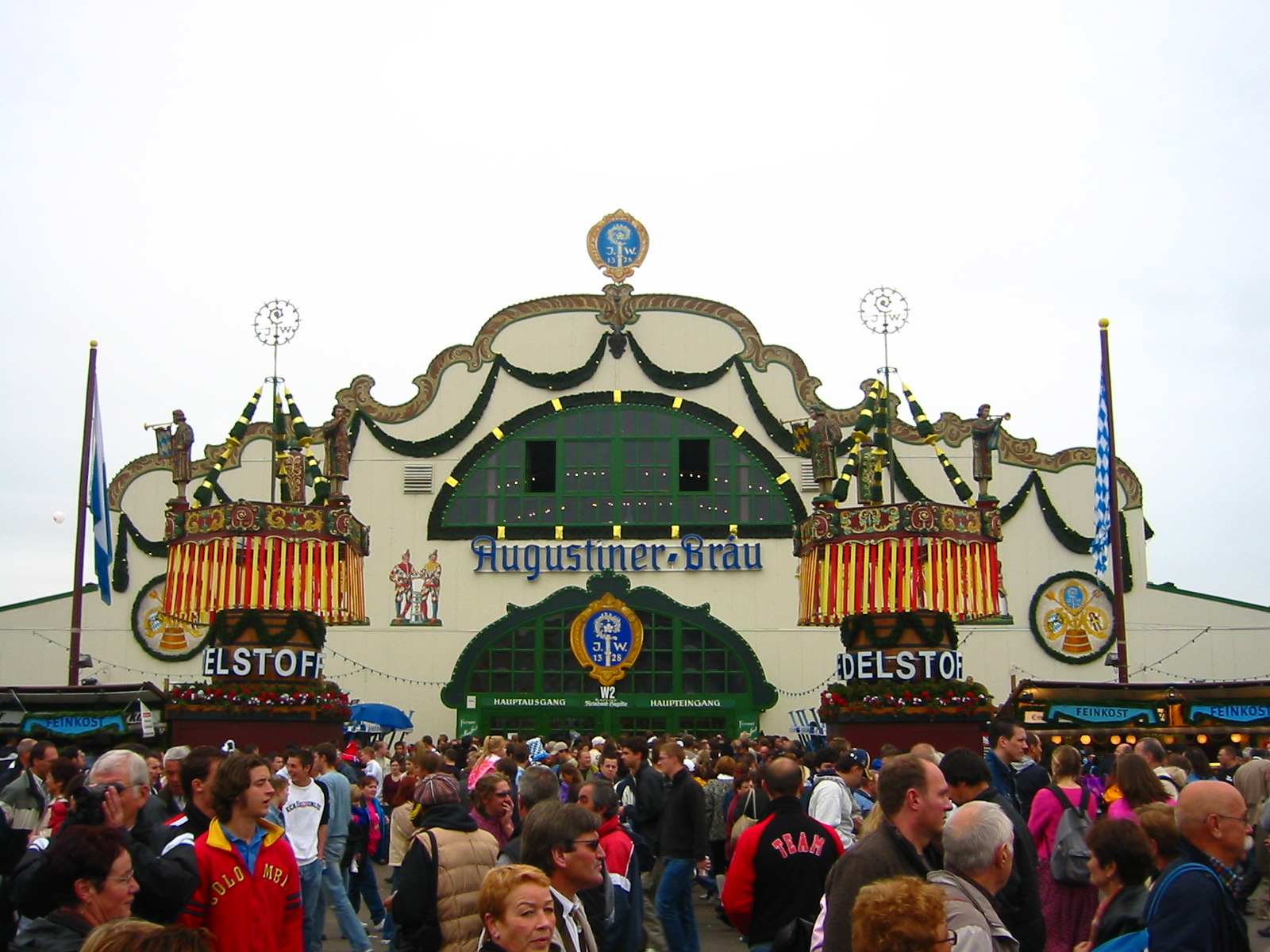
The Augustiner-Festhalle in 2005

The Augustiner brewery is the only Munich brewery that still delivers beer in wooden barrels to the Oktoberfest. The tent provides 6,000 indoor seats and 2,500 outdoor seats. The operators are Manfred and Thomas Vollmer, who also run two Augustiner restaurants on Landsberger Straße and Neuhauser Straße in Munich.

=== Bräurosl (Pschorrbräu-Festhalle) ===
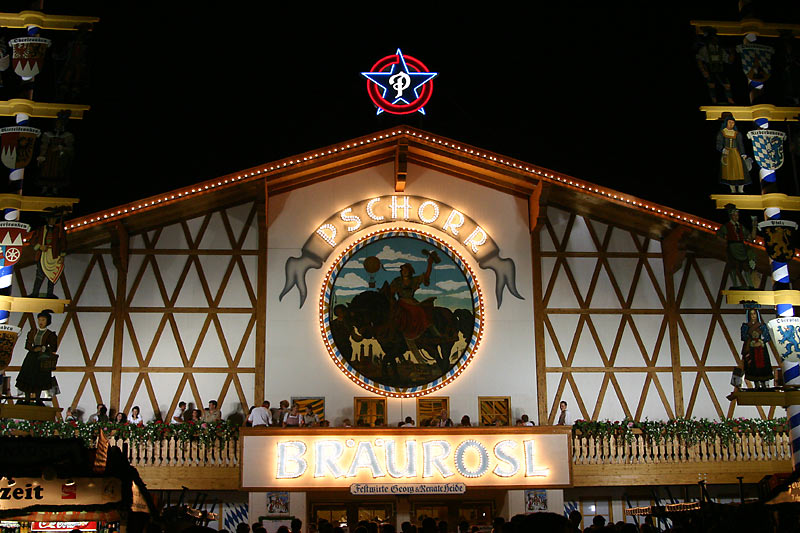
The Bräurosl tent

The Bräurosl tent, also known as the Pschorrbräu-Festhalle, is operated by Peter Reichert, who also runs the Donisl restaurant on Marienplatz. The tent hosts the annual Gay Sunday (Rosa Wiesn) on the first Sunday of the Oktoberfest, an event initiated by the Münchner Löwen Club (MLC).

Two maypoles, each nearly 20 metres high, stand at the entrance. A new tent opened in 2004 with 6,000 indoor seats and 2,500 outdoor seats. In 2010 the capacity rose to 6,200 indoor and 2,200 outdoor seats. After a complete rebuild in 2022, the tent holds 7,050 indoor and 1,200 outdoor guests. Hacker-Pschorr supplies the beer.

=== Fischer-Vroni ===
The Fischer-Vroni is one of the smaller of the 14 large Oktoberfest tents. A new tent opened in 2006 with side galleries. In 2011 a gallery above the main entrance was added, and in 2013 the tent was expanded to include a wooden barrel stock. It provides 3,080 indoor seats and 700 outdoor seats. Like the Augustiner-Festhalle, it serves Augustiner beer on tap. Its specialty is the Steckerlfisch, a grilled fish on a stick.

Since the early 2000s, the second Monday of the festival has become a popular gathering of the LGBTQ community at the tent. The tradition began when the gay host of the Prosecco Bar reserved tables for his guests, and the event grew rapidly in popularity.

=== Hacker-Festzelt ===
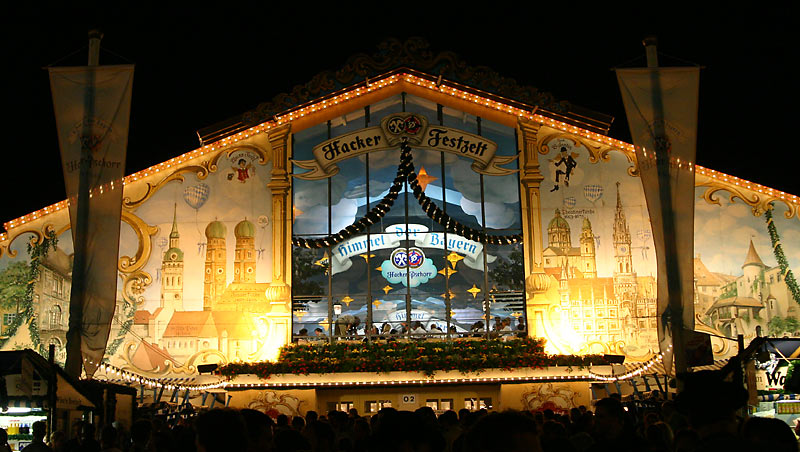
The Hacker-Festzelt

The Hacker-Festzelt measures 90.5 by 43 metres (297 ft × 141 ft) and offers 6,950 indoor seats and 2,350 outdoor seats. In 2004 Rolf Zehetbauer redesigned the tent to reflect the Hacker slogan, Himmel der Bayern (“Heaven of the Bavarians”). That year a 5 × 5 metre “convertible roof” and a rebuilt revolving stage were added.

Since 1994 the Schlager group Die Kirchdorfer has performed daily from noon to 22:30 as the official festival band. The Munich party band Cagey Strings plays daily from 19:00 to 20:30. The Festwirt, Toni Roiderer, also serves as spokesman for the festival hosts.

=== Hippodrom ===
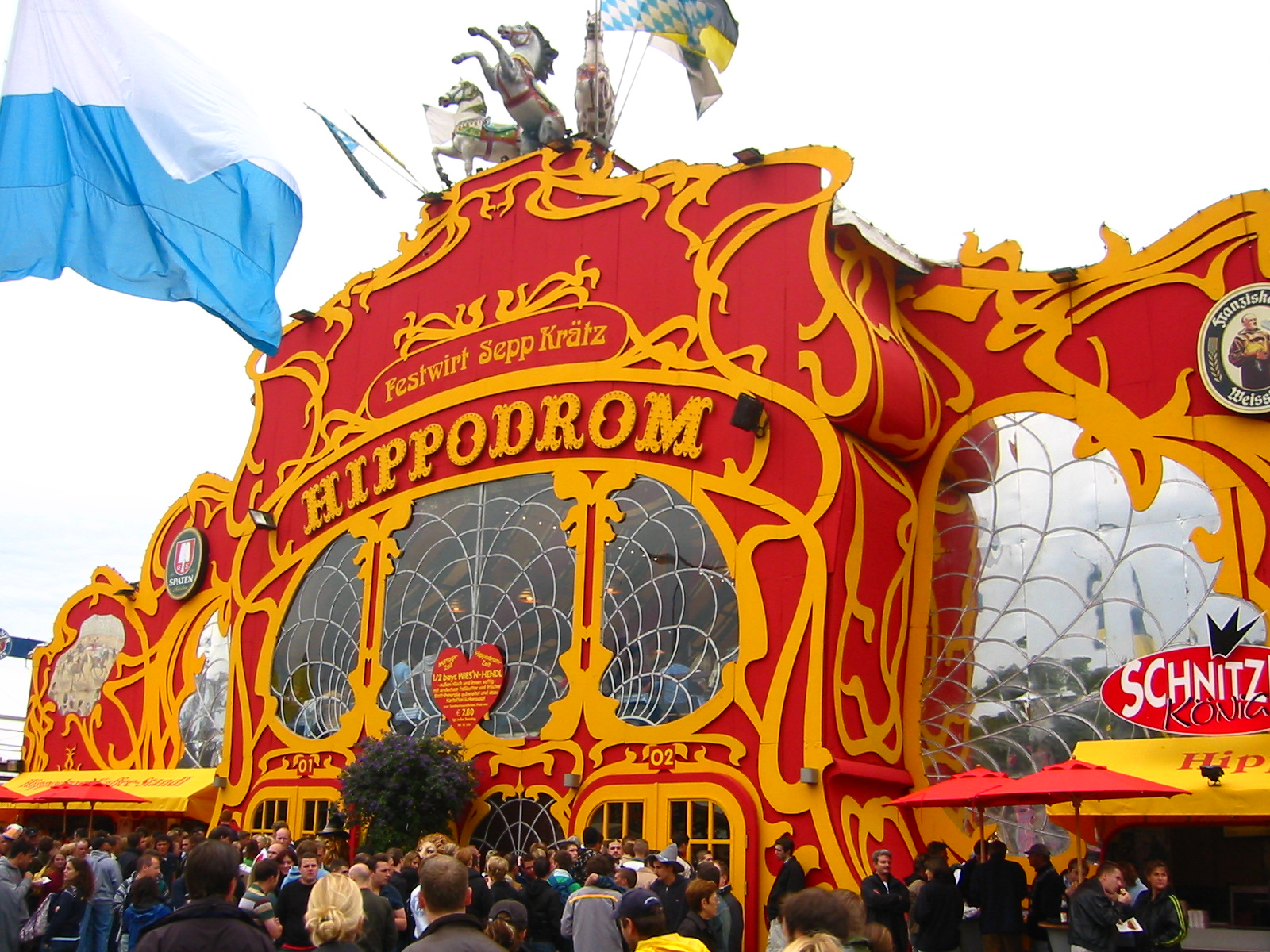
The Hippodrom in 2005

The Hippodrom was first erected at the Oktoberfest by Carl Gabriel in 1902 as a snack and show booth. Until the 1980s, a special feature of the tent was a horse-riding track, a hippodrome, where visitors could ride. During this time a barker stood outside. In the Hippodrom, beer from the Spaten-Franziskaner Brewery was served. It was located next to the main entrance. From 1995 to 2013 the Festwirt was Sepp Krätz, until he lost the concession following a conviction for tax evasion. The succeeding tent was the Marstall.

Bands played regularly in the Hippodrom. It offered 3,300 seats indoors and 1,000 outdoors. The Schlager group Münchner Zwietracht played nightly for more than ten years. Linda Jo Rizzo often appeared as a guest performer.

=== Marstall ===
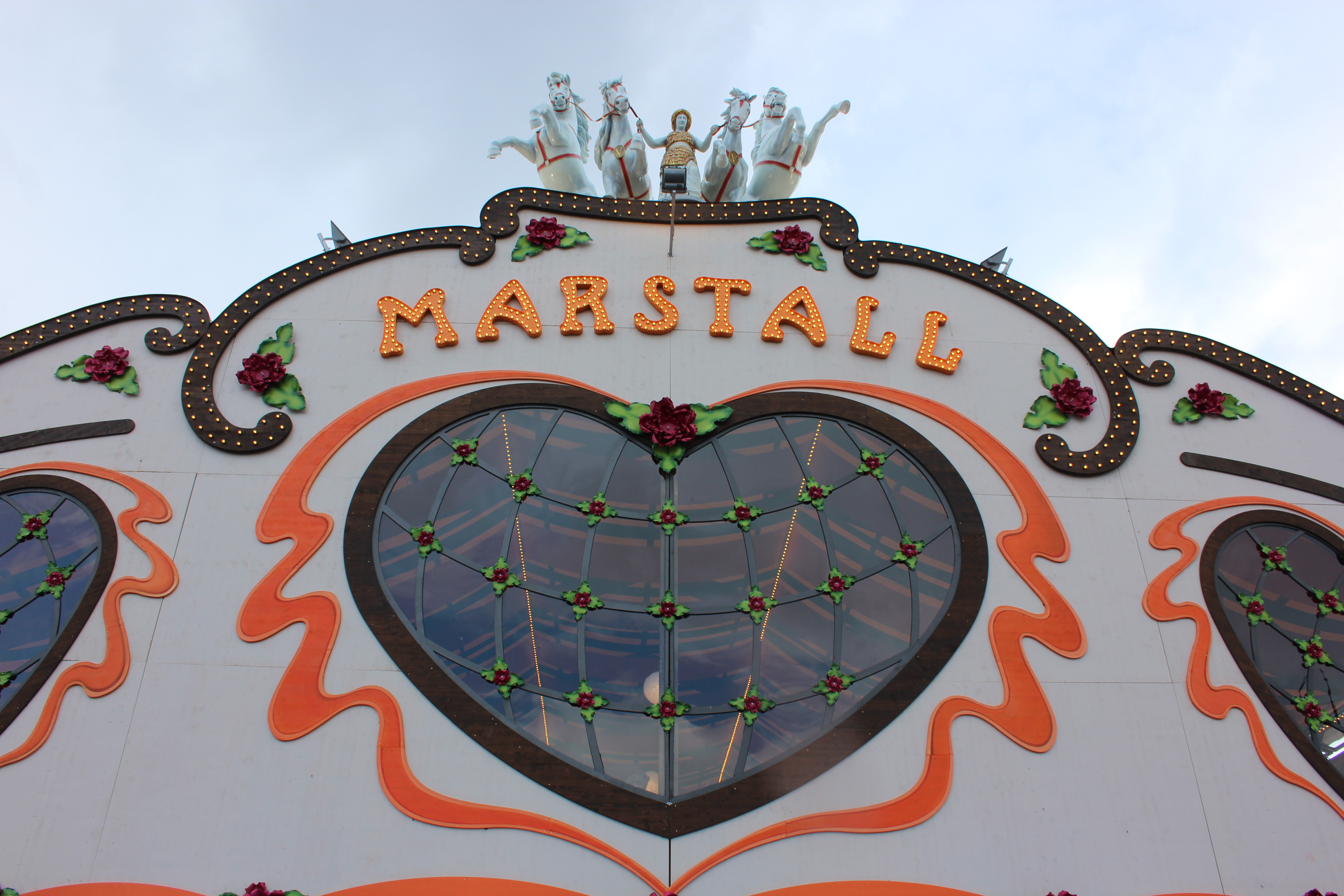
The Marstall

The Marstall replaced the Hippodrom in 2014. The hosts are the Able family. The tent offers 3,200 seats indoors and 1,100 in the beer garden and bar area. As in the Hippodrom, Spaten-Franziskaner provides the beer. The musical programme continues the Hippodrom tradition, with performances from Münchner Zwietracht, Die Oberbayern, and others.

=== Hofbräu-Festzelt ===
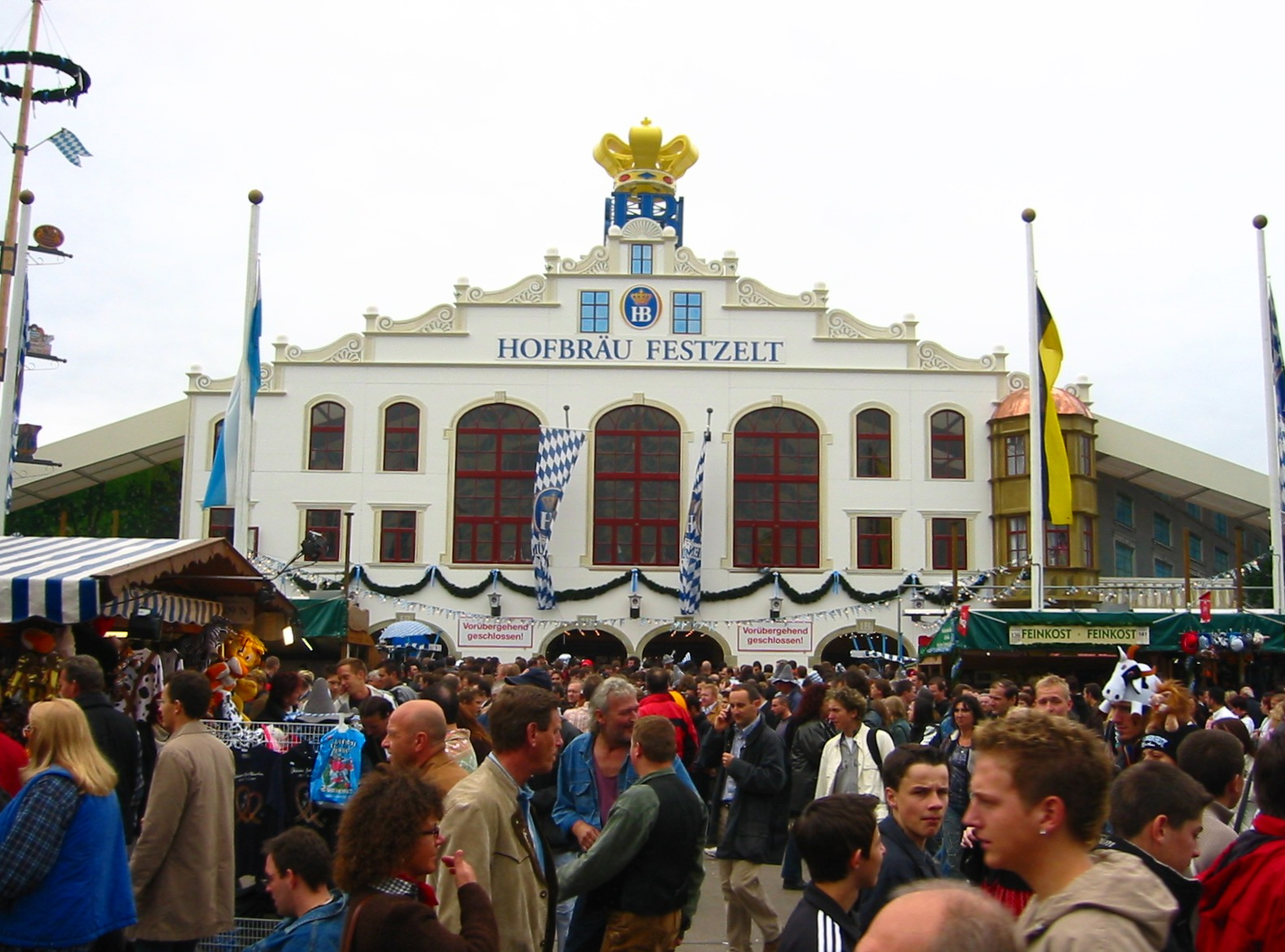
The Hofbräu-Festzelt in 2005

The Hofbräu-Festzelt is the largest Oktoberfest tent, with nearly 10,000 places (6,018 seats and 1,000 standing indoors, plus 3,022 seats outdoors). The Steinberg family has operated the tent since the 1980s and took over the lease of the Hofbräuhauskeller in 1995. It is the only Oktoberfest tent with a standing area of 1,000 places. The interior is decorated with hop vines weighing 12 quintals. The tent covers more than 7,000 square metres (75,000 sq ft). During the festival, visitors consume about 782,400 litres of beer, 70,700 half roast chickens, 4,200 pork knuckles, and 6,200 sausages.

In 2005 the tent received an extension and a new façade. Because of the world-famous Hofbräuhaus, it is especially popular with tourists.

=== Käfer Wiesn Schänke ===
The Käfer Wiesn Schänke is a large log house in the style of a Bavarian farm, first opened in 1971. Unlike the other tents, it is not canvas but a permanent-style structure. It offers 1,400 seats indoors and 1,900 outdoors. The Schänke is known for serving wine, champagne, and upscale dishes, and is a frequent meeting place for celebrities. Service continues until 00:30, later than most other tents.

=== Löwenbräu-Festzelt ===
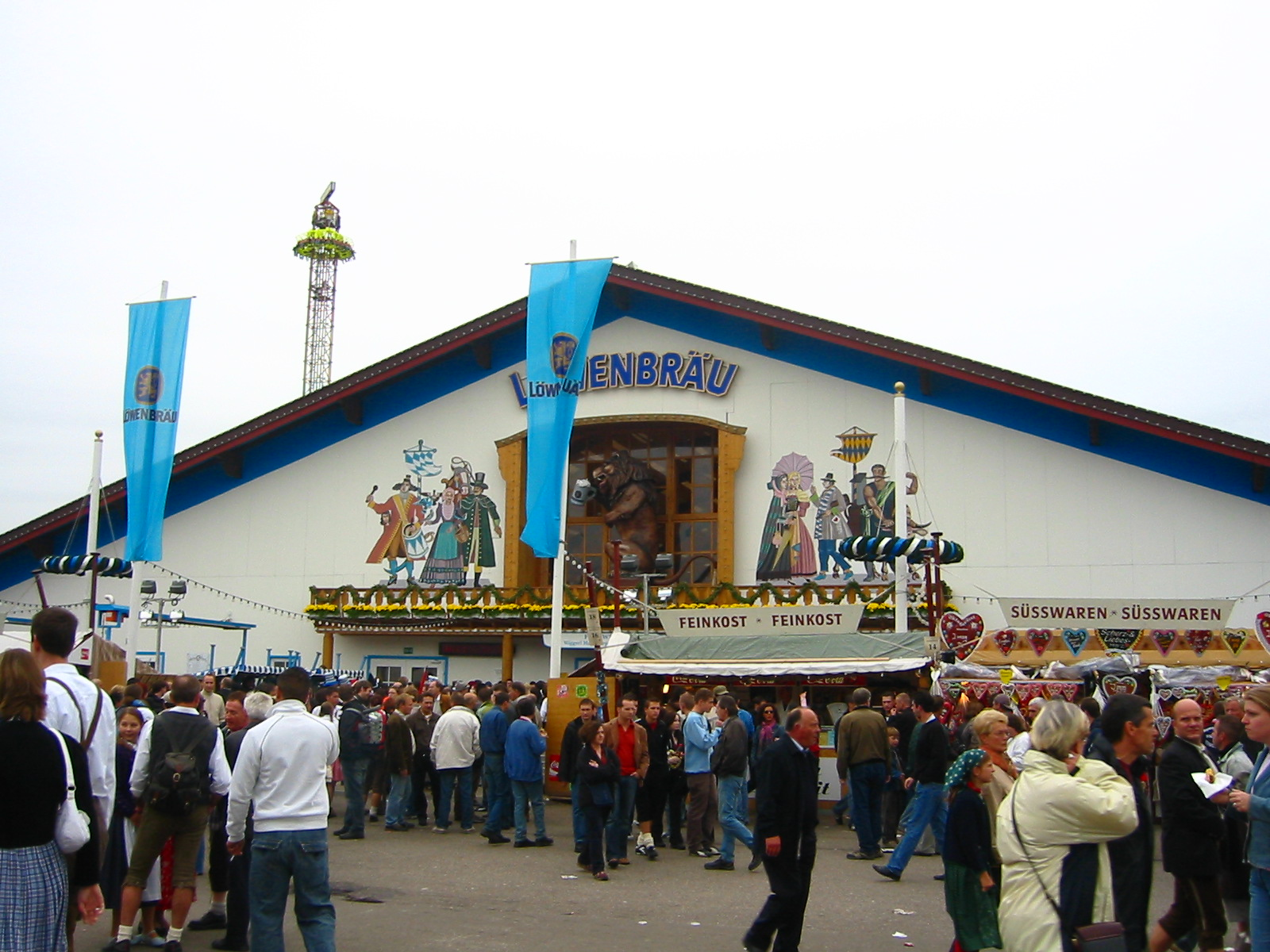
The Löwenbräu-Festzelt

The Löwenbräu-Festzelt has 8,500 seats indoors and outdoors combined. A notable feature is the 37-metre (121 ft) tower topped by a movable lion figure. The tent ceiling is lit by 16,000 light bulbs. Since 1989, the Ladies Wiesn has taken place here, initiated by Regine Sixt.

It is the world’s first beer tent with an ISO 9001 certificate. The managers are Christa Ludwig Hagn and Stephanie Spendler.

=== Ochsenbraterei ===
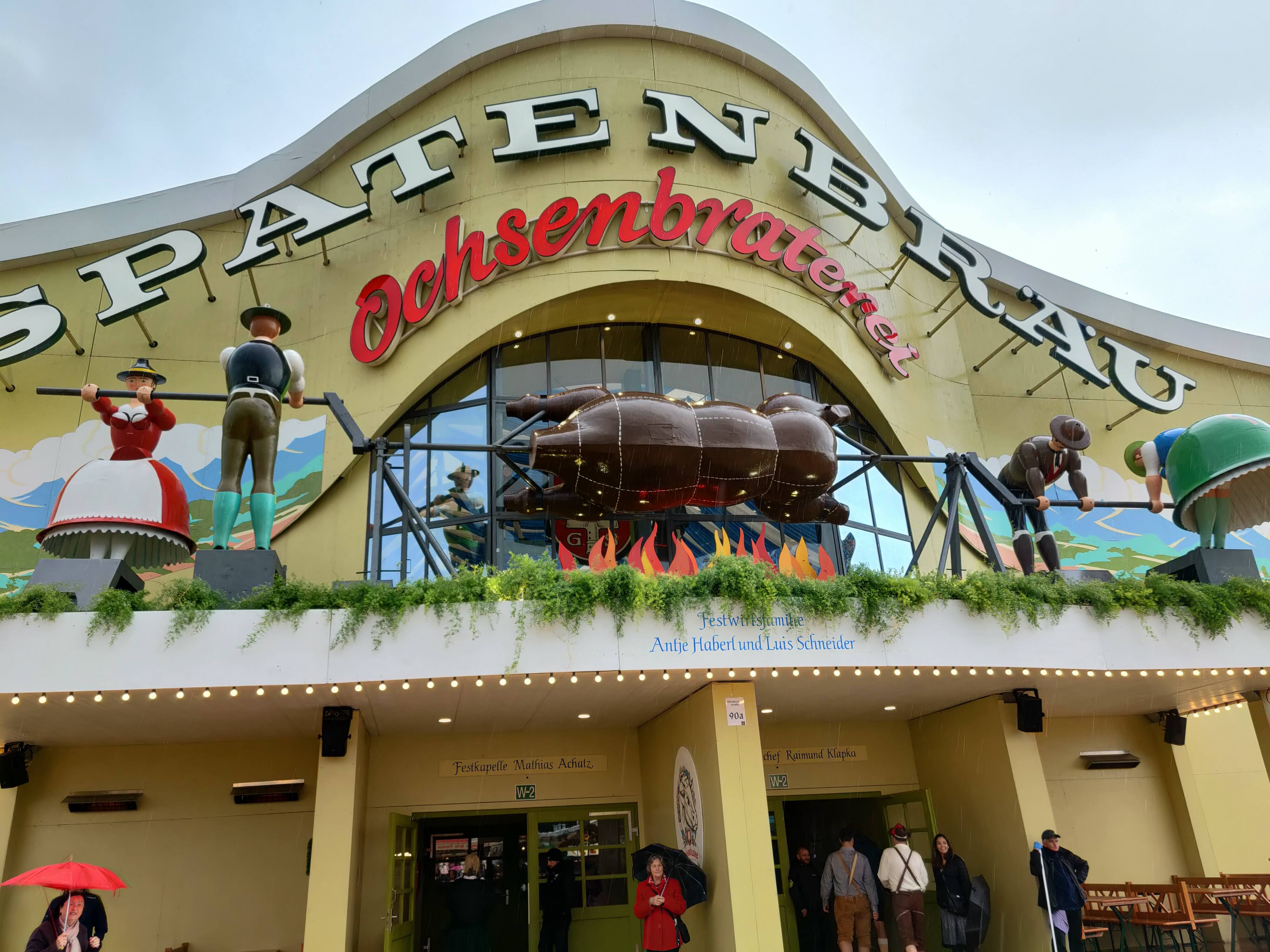
Entrance to the Ochsenbraterei

The Ochsenbraterei (ox rotisserie) has served Spaten beer since 1881, when butcher Johann Rössler first roasted an ox on a skewer at the Oktoberfest. The tent has a floor area of 4,200 square metres (45,000 sq ft) with 5,950 seats, including 1,660 in the pit. A self-service area of 1,700 square metres (18,000 sq ft) provides 1,600 seats.

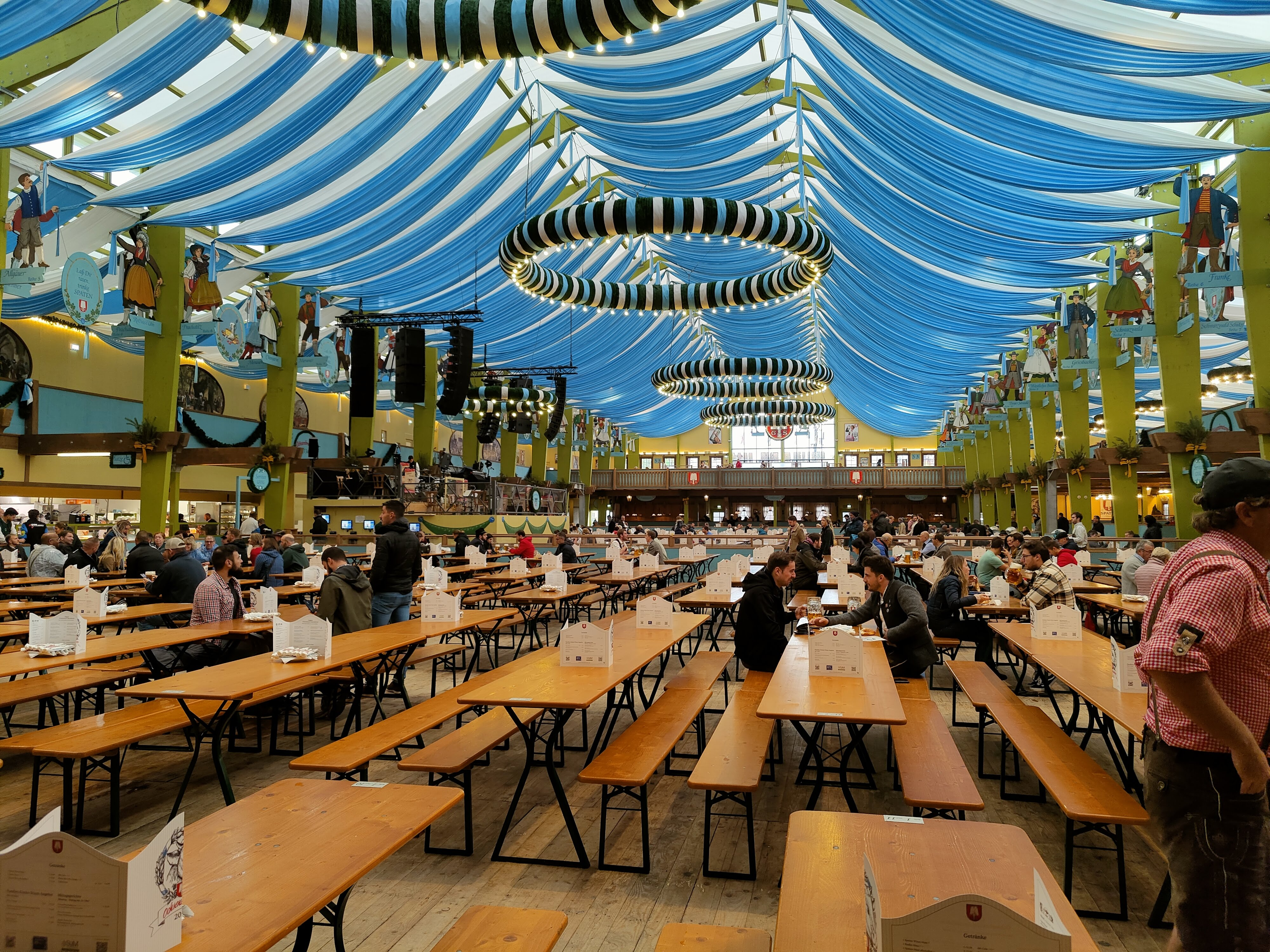
Interior of the Ochsenbraterei

The current tent was manufactured in 1980. Setup takes 10 weeks and dismantling 5 weeks.

=== Schottenhamel ===
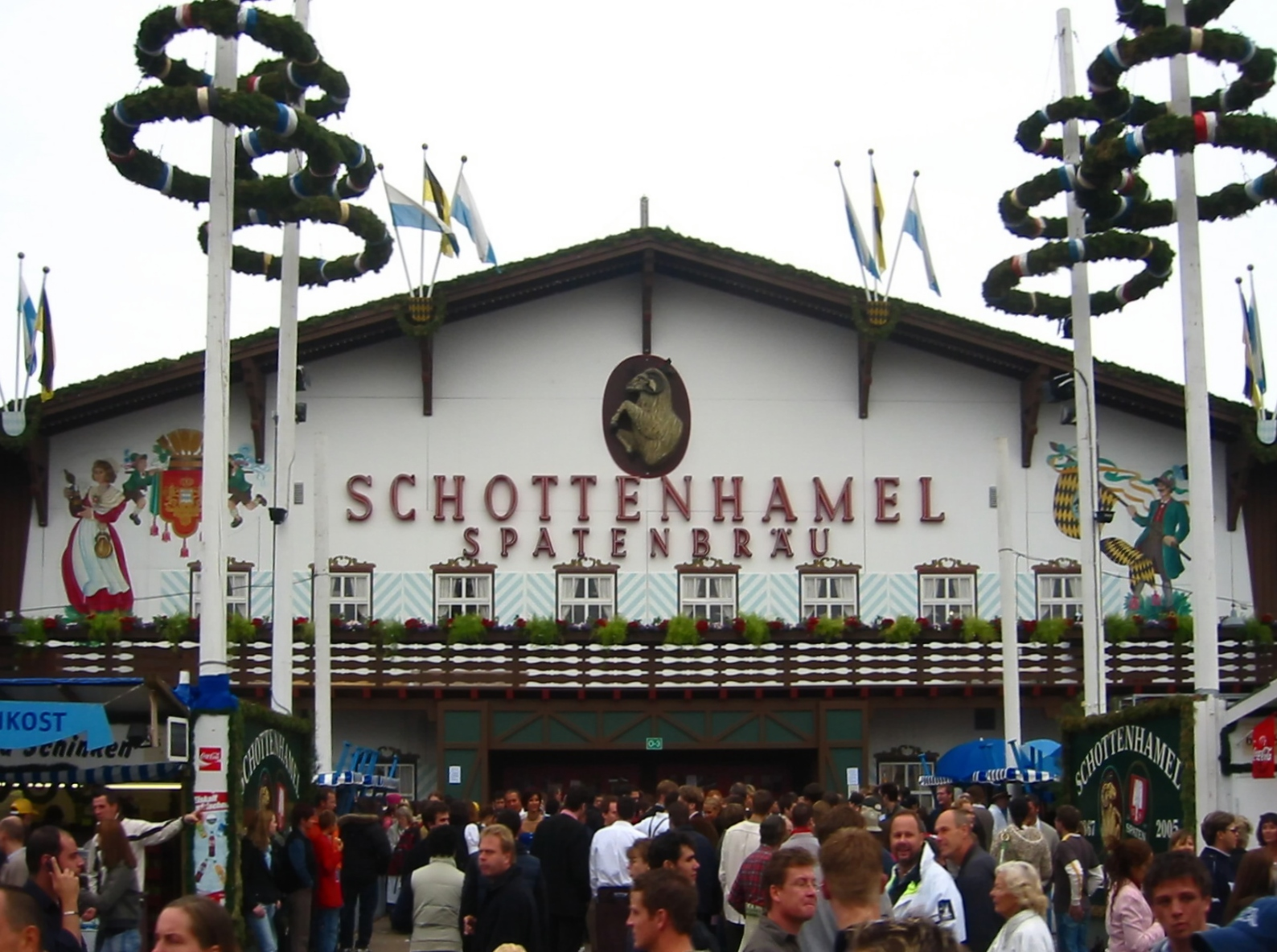
The Schottenhamel in 2005

The Schottenhamel tent dates to 1867, when it was a small shack behind the royal tent. The current structure dates from 1953 and covers 4,800 square metres (52,000 sq ft) with 6,000 seats and two galleries. A garden of 2,200 square metres (24,000 sq ft) offers 4,000 more seats. Today it is managed by Michael F. and Christian Schottenhamel.

The Schottenhamel hosts the traditional O'zapft is! ceremony, when the mayor of Munich taps the first keg. The tent has long been a meeting place for Munich’s student fraternities. Spaten beer is served. Waitresses wear traditional aprons and caps instead of the dirndl.

=== Schützen-Festzelt ===
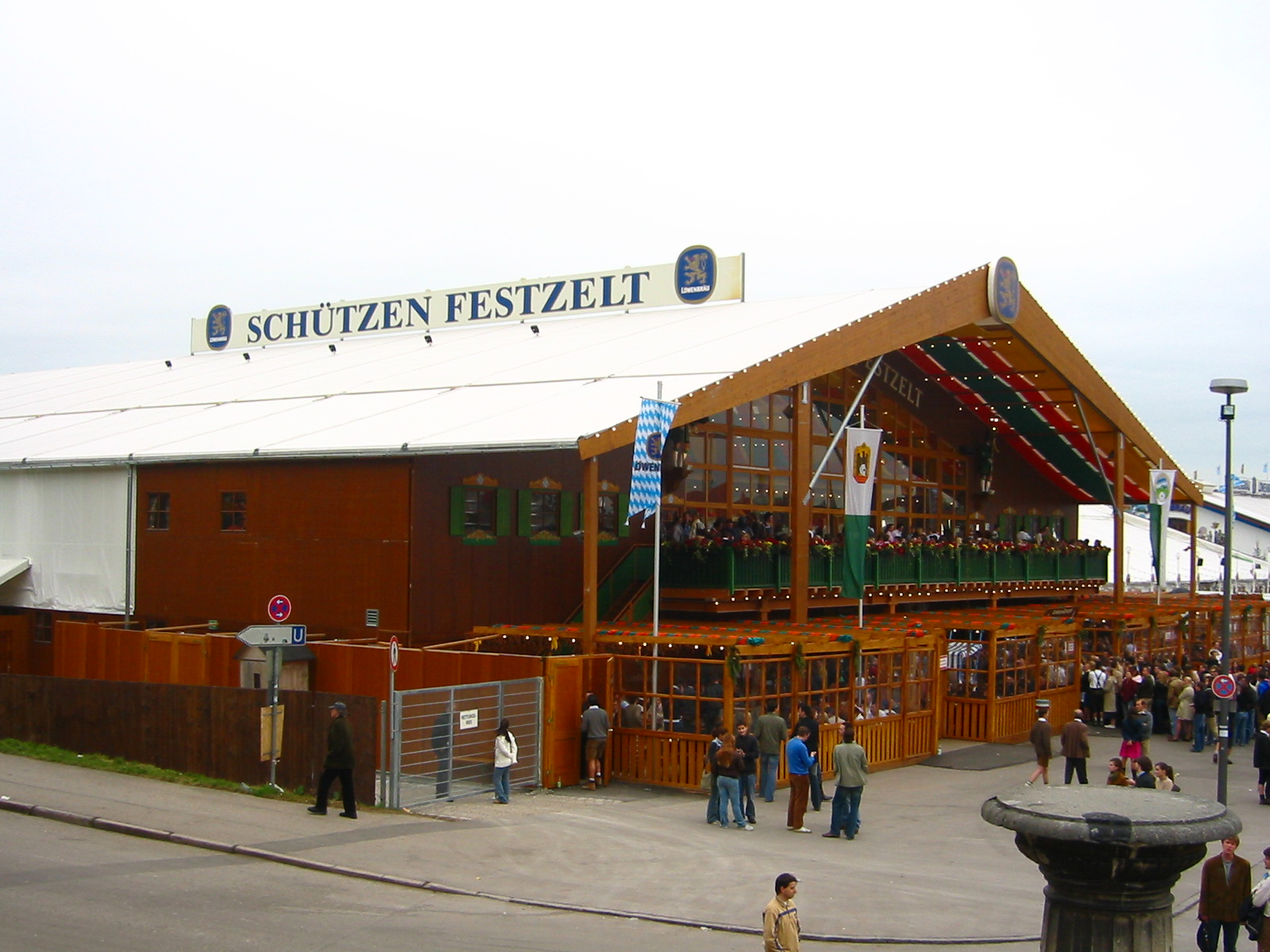
The Schützen-Festzelt

The Schützen-Festzelt provides 5,361 seats (about 4,300 indoors and 1,090 outdoors). It is located beside the Bavaria statue, away from the main Bierstraße. The atmosphere was once considered calmer and older, but evening concerts by Die Niederalmer have attracted younger visitors. Its location between the Hacker-Festzelt and Schottenhamel also makes it a popular youth meeting point.

As one of the oldest tents, it houses 110 shooting stands for the Oktoberfest-Landesschießen competition. Claudia and Eduard Reinbold serve as hosts. The house specialty is roasted pig marinated in malt beer.

=== Weinzelt ===
The Weinzelt (wine tent), operated by Roland, Doris, and Stephan Kuffler, has been part of the Oktoberfest since 1984. It seats 2,500 guests. A new design was introduced in 2005

== Smaller Tents ==
In addition to the 15 large tents found at the Oktoberfest, there are also the smaller tents, which are mainly the rotisserie chicken stands like Wienerwald, Cafe Kaiserschmarrn (Rischart), Vinzenz Murr, Poschners, Heimer, Cafe Mohrenkopf, Bodos café tent, the Inn in Schichtl and the Ammer chicken and duck rotisserie that, since 2000, only sells organic products.
