= O'zapft is! =

Tradition of the Oktoberfest in Munich, Germany

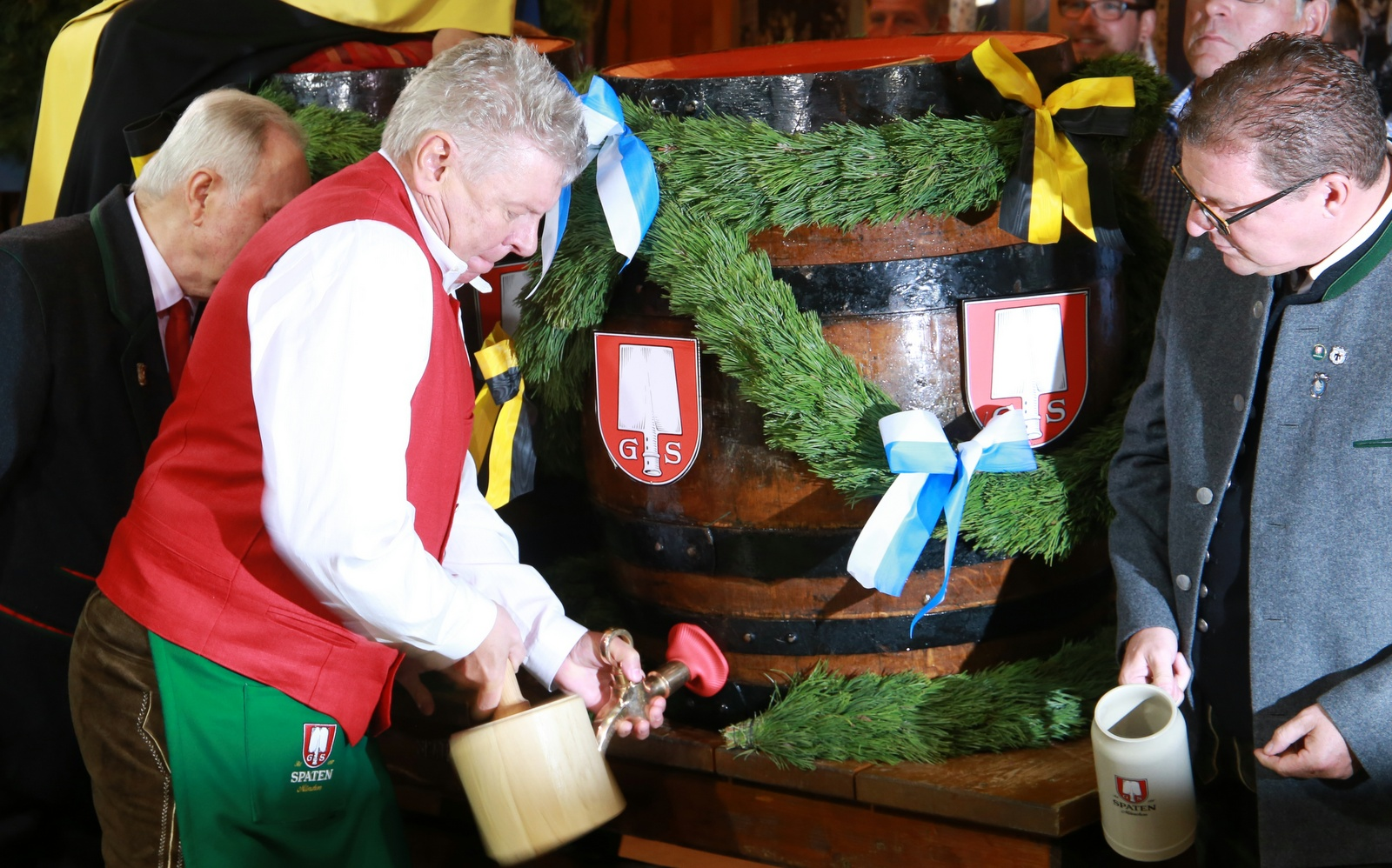
Dieter Reiter opening the barrel in 2017

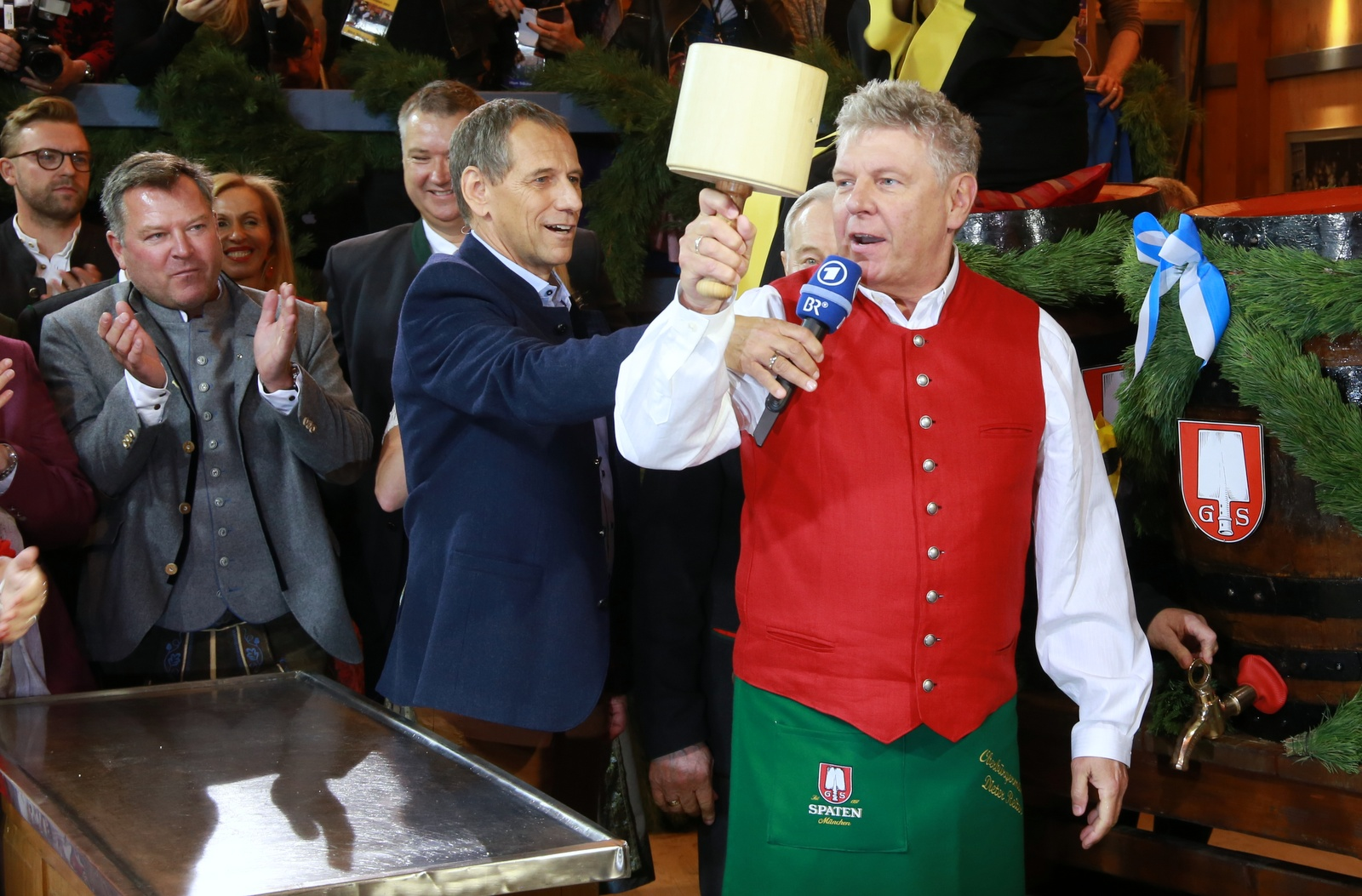
Dieter Reiter exclaiming "O'zapft is!"

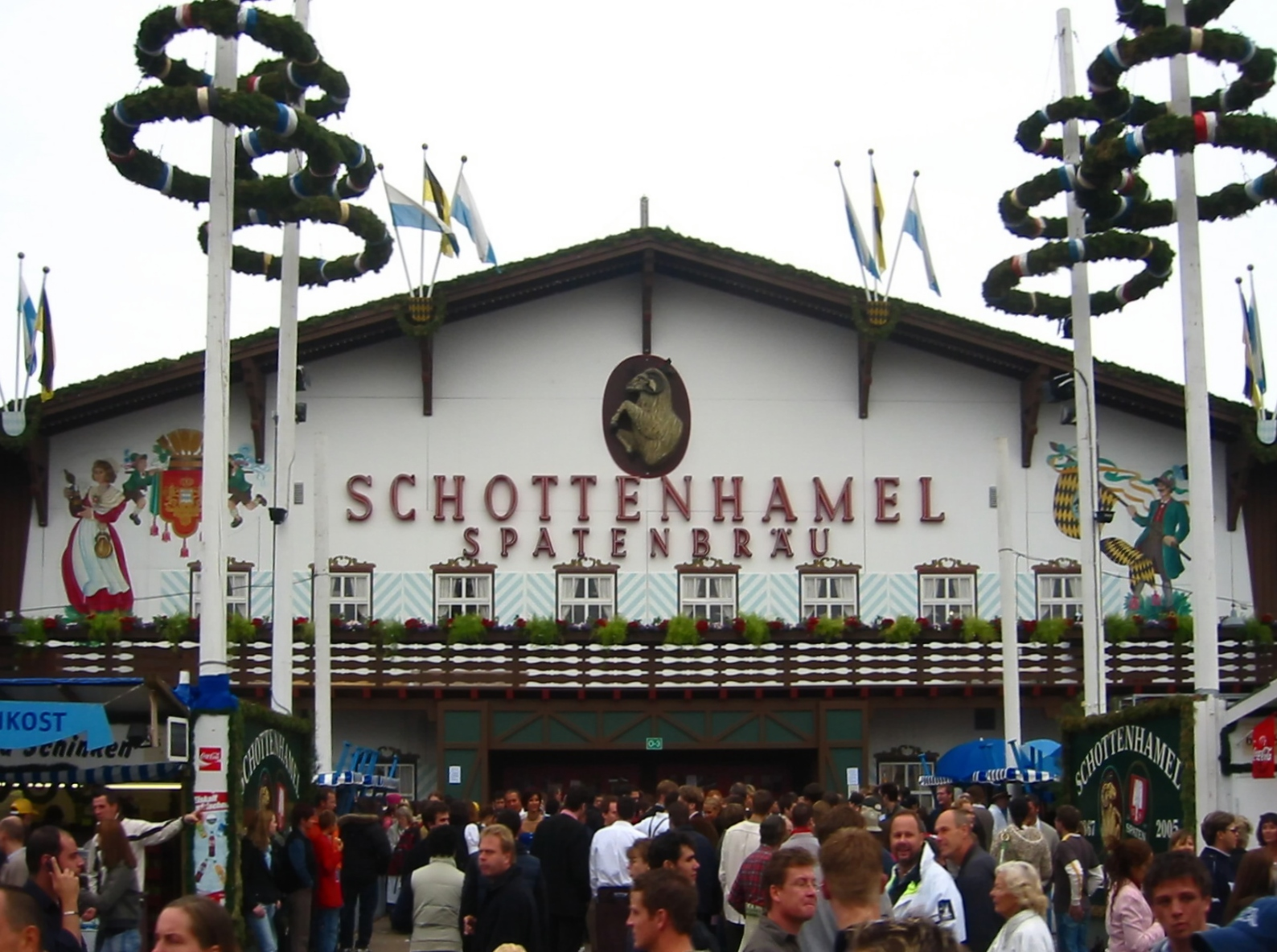
The Schottenhamel tent

The exclamation "O'zapft is!" (Bavarian for "It is tapped", standard German: "Es ist angezapft") is a tradition during the tapping of the first beer barrel by the mayor of Munich in the Schottenhamel tent at the opening of the Oktoberfest in Munich, Germany since 1950. The exclamation is followed by a signal of twelve gunshots, signalling that beer may now be sold in all of the tents. The opening ceremony takes place every year at noon on the first Saturday after 15 September. The traditional exclamation "O'zapft is!" is always followed by the wish "Auf eine friedliche Wiesn" ("for a peaceful Oktoberfest").

== History ==
After the Mayor of Munich Thomas Wimmer had opened the "Münchener Elektro-Messe 1950" in the Theresienhöhe district, he made his way to the Schottenhamel tent on the Theresienwiese meadow. Reporters and photographers had been waiting for him and so he performed the first official opening of Oktoberfest. He dedicated the first Maß of beer to Oktoberfest and to the city of Munich, in 1980 the minister-president of Bavaria and the candidate for Chancellor of Germany Franz Josef Strauß started a tradition that the first Maß of beer goes to the current minister-president, continuing to this day. The legend that the first opening of Oktoberfest in 1950 was spontaneous after Wimmer had missed his carriage and had to be taken to the fest grounds by the innkeeper Michael Schottenhamel has been proven false with photographs and newspaper articles. From 1950 to 1951 the first barrel to be opened was Hofbräubier, since 1952 it has been Spatenbräu. In 1960 the newly elected mayor Hans-Jochen Vogel deferred the honour of opening the first barrel to his predecessor Wimmer. Vogel only took on the ceremony in 1964 after Wimmer's death, and at that time a rule was made that it is the duty of the mayor of Munich to open the Oktoberfest ceremony.

The most performances have been made by Christian Ude in 2005 and from 2008 to 2013, as well as Dieter Reiter from 2015 to 2019. Ude holds the record of number of opening ceremonies with 20 openings, followed by his predecessor Georg Kronawitter with 15 openings. In 2018 Reiter forgot to follow the exclamation with "Auf eine friedliche Wiesn".
