= Spatenbräu =

Brewery in Munich, Germany, opened 1363

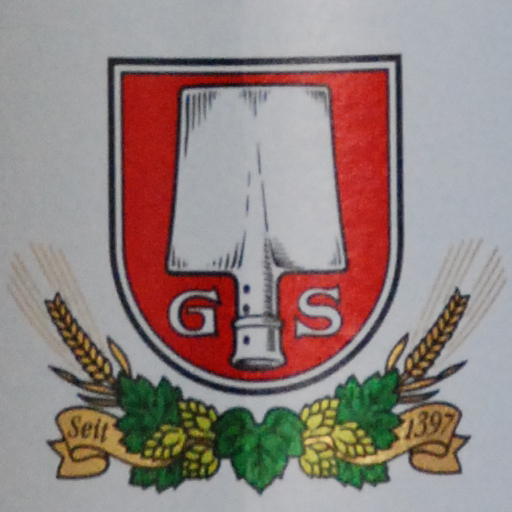

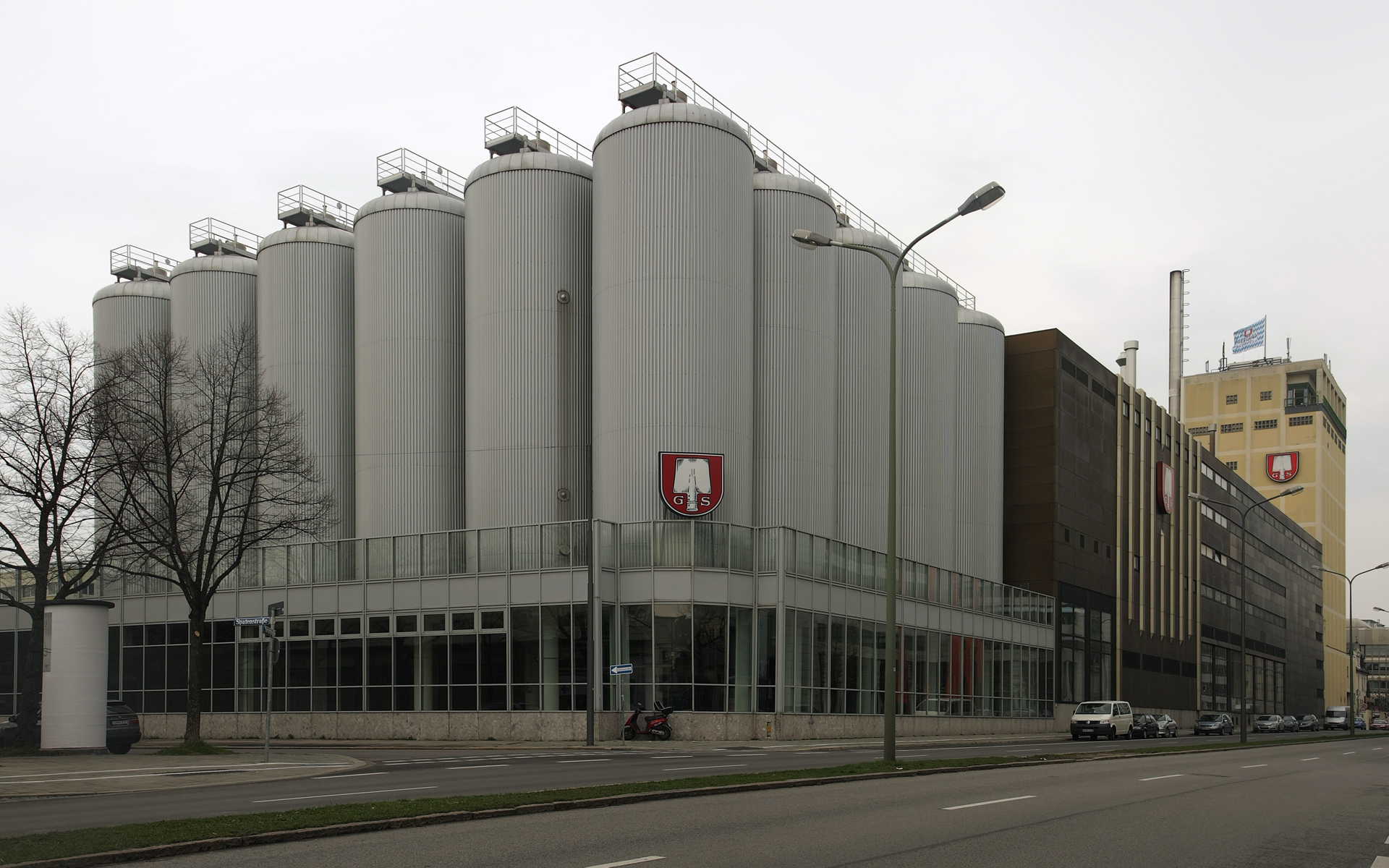
- Location: Upper Bavaria, Munich, Bavaria, Germany
- Opened: 1397

Spatenbräu is a brewery in Munich, Germany, with a history going back to 1397. Since 1922, the brewery has been part of Spaten-Franziskaner-Bräu GmbH, which has itself been part of the Spaten-Franziskaner-Bräu group since 1997. It is now owned by the Anheuser-Busch-InBev brewery group. The beer writer Michael Jackson considered the Spaten brewery as the most significant brewery in the history of lager beer because of its innovations in the 19th century.

== History ==
The Steuerbuch der Stadt München first mentions a brewer named Hans Welser having a brewery at Neuhausergasse 4, called Welser Prew, in 1397. The brewery expanded greatly during the following 125 years, until it belonged to the family Starnberger for exactly a century from 1522 to 1622. From 1622 to 1704 it was owned by the family Spatt, where it got its current name, as its new owner in 1807, the Sießmayr family, kept its name as Spaten.

In 1807, the royal brewer Gabriel Sedlmayr acquired the Spaten brewery, which was the smallest brewery in Munich at the time. This started the era of the Sedlmayr family, whose progeny still manage the company. In 1817, the brewery bought the Filserbräukeller premises on Bayerstraße, which was later known as Spaten-Keller.

After the death of Gabriel Sedlmayr, his sons Gabriel Sedlmayr Jr. and Joseph Sedlmayr took over the brewery. In 1842, Joseph Sedlmayr bought the Leistbrauerei brewery and resigned as owner of the Spaten brewery. In 1851, the brewery acquired the Silberbauer-Keller premises on the "green meadow" at Marsstraße 46-48 and expanded bit by bit. In three years, the brewery had completely moved to its new premises on Marsstraße.

Joseph Sedlmayer, the owner of the Leistbrauerei brewery reportedly founded in the 15th century, acquired the shares of August Denmayr in 1861, with whom he jointly managed the Franziskaner brewery since 1858.

In 1861, the Spaten brewery had become the largest brewery in Munich. It managed to keep this status until the 1890s. The brewery was awarded the gold medal at the Paris World Fair for its beer, the only German brewery to achieve this.

In 1874, Johann Carl and Anton Sedlmayr acquired ownership of the brewery from their father, Gabriel. In 1896, the Spaten brewery brewed the Münchner Hell beer as the first brewery in Munich. This was to be exported to northern Germany. In the following year, the brewery brought this beer to the market in Munich, where it soon became very popular.

The Spaten brewery founded a branch office in London in the United Kingdom in 1891, which started regularly exporting Spaten beer to the United States in 1909. In 1911, Heinrich and Fritz Sedlmayr, the sons of Anton and Carl Sedlmayr, respectively, took over as owners of the Spaten brewery.

In 1922, the Spatenbräu and Franziskaner-Leist-Bräu breweries, both owned by the Sedlmayr family, were joined into the company Gabriel-und-Joseph-Sedlmayr-Spaten-Franziskaner-Leistbräu. In the same year, this was joined by the Löwenbrauerei brewery. In 1924, the advertising slogan Lass Dir raten, trinke Spaten ("Let me suggest you to drink Spaten"), still in use to this day, was born. After two years, the Spatenbräu Hellbier, known as Vollmalz since 1941, came on the market.

The Spaten brewery suffered severe damage during the Allied bombing of Munich from 1943 to 1945, and because of this, export of beer to other countries in Europe and overseas was only again possible in 1950. Spatenbräu premiered the Champagner-Weiße, their first wheat beer, at the Oktoberfest in 1964.

In 1992, the Spaten brewery reached one million hectolitres of brewed beer. In 1997, the brewery joined with the neighbouring brewery Löwenbräu to form the Spaten-Franziskaner-Bräu brewery. In 2003, the brewery was bought by the Belgian brewery concern Interbrew.

During the following years, all of the kettles of the brewery were put out of use one by one. Since then, the premises of the Spatenbräu brewery have hosted a visitor museum, and no brewing of beer takes place there anymore. After the fusion with Löwenbräu, all beer production has taken place at the former brewhouse of Löwenbräu AG. Only the filling mechanism and the tanks to store the beer remain at the brewery. There have been no new investments since. The brewery is still contemplating moving to new brewery premises on the edge of the city. In 2008, InBev negotiated selling the Spaten-Löwenbräu group to the Radeberger Group owned by Dr. Oetker. During the new year between 2009 and 2010, it became known that the AB-InBev concern was taking closing down the Spatenbräu and Löwenbräu breweries into consideration. In October 2010, the brewery announced that it had postponed the plans to move into new premises inside the city into the future.

The logo of the brewery was designed by graphic artist Otto Hupp in 1884. In 1821, the brewery supported the acquisition of the first steam engine in Bavaria. The invention of the first steadily working chiller by Carl von Linde in 1873 was supported by the brewery.

Spaten has brewed a variety of beer including Lager, Oktoberfestbier, Optimator, Munchner Hell, Pils, Light, Alkoholfrie, Champagner-Weiße, Dunkel, Bock, Gold, Special Dark and MaiBock.

== Literature ==
- Wolfgang Behringer: Die Spaten-Brauerei 1397–1997. Die Geschichte eines Münchner Unternehmens vom Mittelalter bis zur Gegenwart. Piper, Munich 1997, ISBN 3-492-03600-7.
- Ingrid Haslinger. Kunde – Kaiser. Die Geschichte der ehemaligen k. u. k. Hoflieferanten. Schroll, Vienna 1996, ISBN 3-85202-129-4.
- Gabriel Sedlmayr: Spaten-Franziskaner-Bräu A.G., München. Länderdienst, Brilon Westfalen / Basel 1953 (= Internationale Industrie-Bibliothek volume 95, in German, English and French).
- Gabriel Sedlmayr: Spaten-Franziskaner-Bräu A.G., München: Seit 1397, Länderdienst, Berlin / Basel 1963 (= Internationale Industrie-Bibliothek, volume 164, in German, English and French).
- Gabriel Sedlmayr, Spaten-Franziskaner-Bräu (ed.): 600 Jahre Spaten München: 1397–1997. Jubiläums-Chronik, Spaten-Franziskaner-Bräu KGaA, Munich 1997.
- Fritz Sedlmayr: Die Geschichte der Spatenbrauerei und brauereigeschichtliche Beiträge 1807–1874. Volume I. Munich 1934 / Volume II. Nuremberg 1949.
