= Stiegl Brewery =

Brewery in Salzburg, Austria

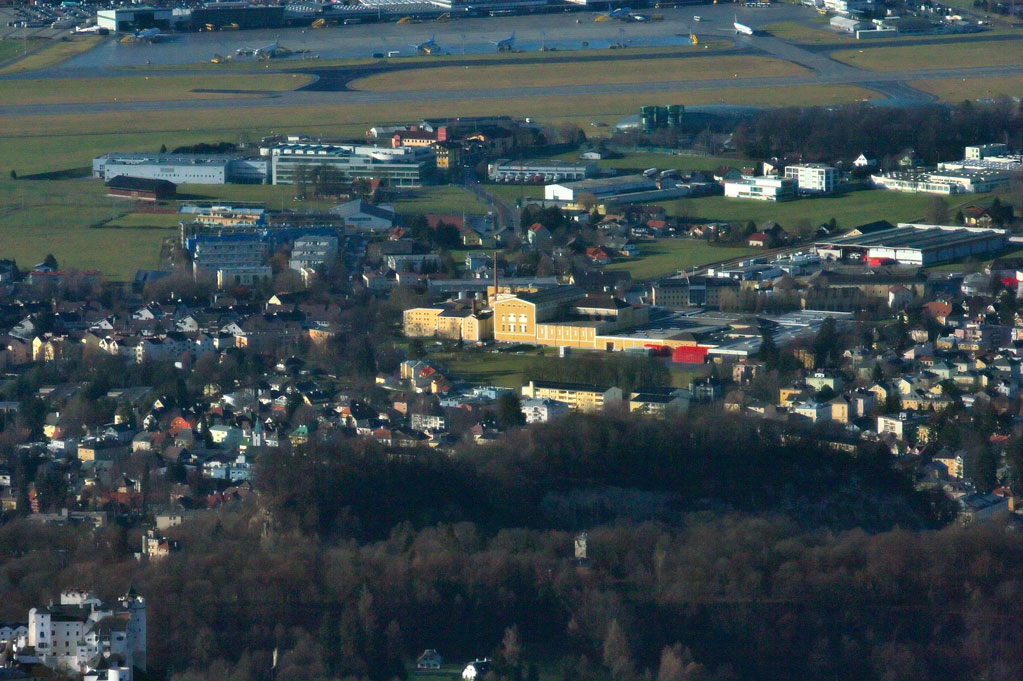
- Industry: Brewery
- Founded: 1492; 534 years ago
- Headquarters: Salzburg, Austria
- Website: www.stiegl.at

Stiegl Brewery (German: Stieglbrauerei) is a brewery company founded in 1492 in the city of Salzburg. Stiegl is the most common beer brand in Austria. Stiegl brews both a helles (a light lager) and a Weissbier (Hefeweizen), as well as other specialty beers, including a grapefruit Radler. Stiegl is the most popular beer of Austria that is not owned by Brau Union.

The brewery has a large museum of beer and beer making on the outskirts of Salzburg, a tour of which ends in a visit to the pub for a beer on the house.
