= Helles =

Type of pale lager beer

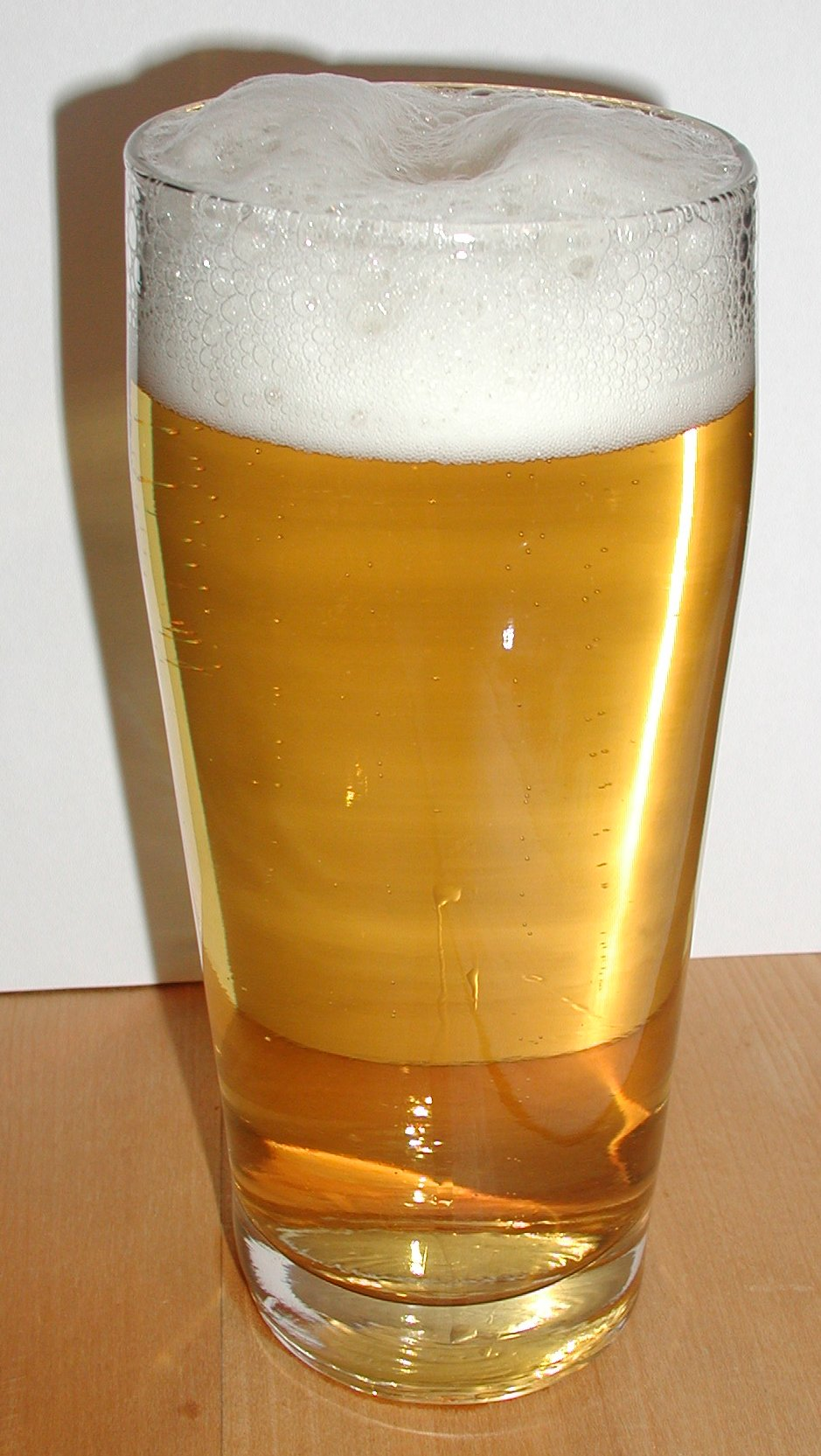
A glass of helles

Helles or hell is a traditional German pale lager beer, mainly produced in Southern Germany, particularly Munich, but is also gaining both in popularity and production in the United States. The German word hell can be translated as 'bright', 'light', or 'pale'.

== Flavour profile ==
Helles-style beers are typically medium-bodied, mildly sweet and light-coloured, with low bitterness (15-25 IBUs) and strong malt aroma and flavour. The beer is clear due to filtration before bottling, though some restaurants and breweries offer an unfiltered version. Munich-style helles is a yellow beer brewed using cool fermentation with a lager yeast such as Saccharomyces pastorianus, bitter hops such as Hallertau hops, and an original specific gravity (prior to fermentation) between 1.044 and 1.048 (11 to 12 degrees plato), and between 4.7 and 5.6% alcohol by volume. Helles has a less pronounced hop flavour and aroma than German pilsner beers.

== History ==
Until the 1960s, Helles was universally available in German-speaking regions. In many regions, Helles was slowly replaced by pilsner-style beers, which was also driven by changing consumer preferences from draft beer to bottled beer. In regions outside of Southern Germany, Helles was regaining popularity in 2010, particularly Berlin, where the beer's traditional image has become trendy.

== Distribution ==
Helles enjoys great popularity in the Southern German regions of Bavaria, Franconia, and Baden-Württemberg. It can be referred to as Helles, Spezial, Landbier, "Munich lager", or "export". No clear distinction is drawn between lager and export, although export typically is closer in style to Dortmunder Export, which has a slightly higher ABV of 5.5% for extended shelf life.

== Examples ==
- Andechser Hell
- Augustiner-Bräu Lagerbier Hell
- Ayinger Lager Hell
- Bayreuther Hell
- Chiemseer Hell
- Dinkelacker Hell
- Erdinger Brauhaus Helles
- Flötzinger Hell
- Giesinger Münchner Hell
- Hacker-Pschorr Münchner Helles
- Hofbräu München Original
- Kichesippi Beer Co. Heller Highwater
- Löwenbräu Original
- Oberdorfer Helles
- Paulaner Münchner Hell
- Spaten Münchner Hell
- Schönramer Hell
- Stiegl Hell
- Tegernseer Hell
- Weihenstephaner Original
- Ølsnedkeren Sikkert og vist
- Юзберг Helles
- "This Town" Lager - Carton Brewing

== See also ==
- Beer in Germany
- Beer in the United States
- Beer in New Jersey
