= Löwenbräu Brewery =

German brewery

Löwenbräu AG
- Interactive map of Löwenbräu AG
- Location: Munich, Bavaria, Germany
- Coordinates: 48°8′51.77″N 11°33′14.08″E
- Opened: 1383; 643 years ago
- Key people: Ludwig Brey; Joseph Schülein; Andreas Girke; Günter Kador; Dr. Jörg Lehmann
- Owned by: AB InBev
- Employees: 400
- Website: www.loewenbraeu.de

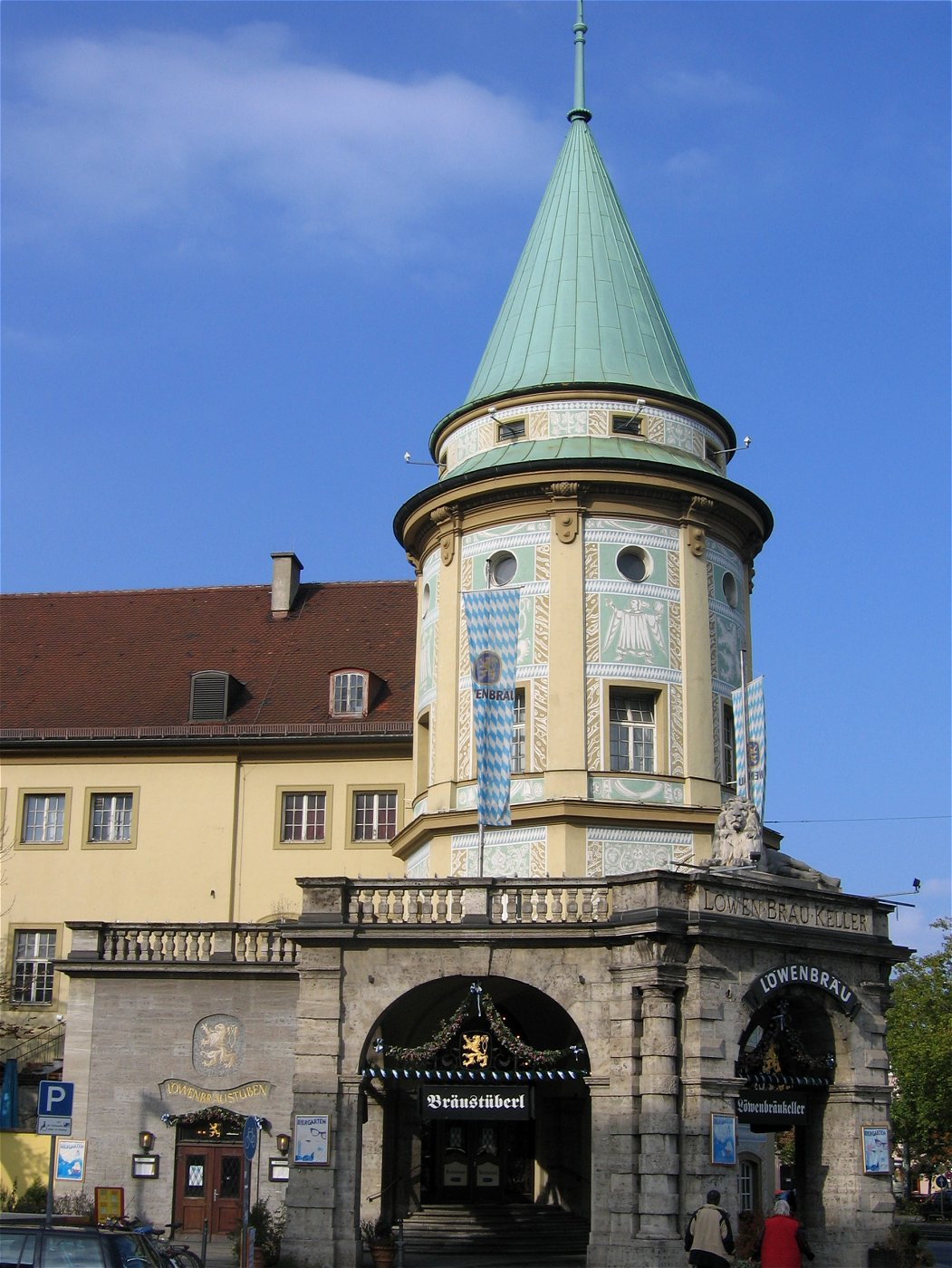
The Löwenbräukeller in Munich

Löwenbräu (pronounced [ˈløːvn̩bʁɔʏ]; German for 'Lion's Brew') is a brewery in Munich. Most of its beers are marketed as being brewed according to the Reinheitsgebot, the Bavarian beer purity regulation of 1516.

== History ==
Löwenbräu claims to have been founded around 1383. In 1524, Jörg Schnaitter, a pierprew (beer brewer), is mentioned in connection with the property at the address 17 Löwengrube. The brewery was first mentioned in 1746 in the Munich tax records. The lion emblem originates from a 17th-century fresco in the brewing house, depicting Daniel in the lions' den.

In 1818, Georg Brey, a brewer of peasant origins, bought the brewery, which began to grow under his management. In 1826, brewing operations began moving to a new location on Nymphenburger Strasse; the move was completed in 1851. By 1863, Löwenbräu had become the largest brewery in Munich, producing a quarter of the city's beer output.

The brewery was formally incorporated in 1872 under the name Aktienbrauerei zum Löwenbräu. As brewer and owner, Ludwig Brey acquired the neighboring properties of Nikolaus Nassl, a Bierwirt (seller of beer). By Brey's order in 1882 and 1883, the Rank brothers built the Löwenbräukeller, according to the plans of Albert Schmidt on the brewery's property. The grand opening of the Löwenbräukeller was on 14 June 1883. In 1886, the lion trademark was registered. By the turn of the century, Löwenbräu was the largest brewery in Germany.

The export business was affected by World War I and Löwenbräu's London Depot closed for the duration, making its employees redundant.

In 1921, Löwenbräu merged with Unionsbräu Schülein & Cie and Munich Bürgerbräu, two other breweries. These mergers brought Löwenbräu more property, including the Bürgerbräukeller. In 1923, this beer hall became noted as the location of the unsuccessful Beer Hall Putsch which Adolf Hitler led against the government of the German state of Bavaria, of which Munich was the capital. In 1928, the company's beer production first exceeded a million hectoliters per year. The supervisory board of the new corporation included Wilhelm von Finck, one of the owners of Bürgerbräu, and Joseph Schülein, who was Jewish. Schülein's later tenure as the company's owner led the Nazis to deride Löwenbräu beer as "Jewsbeer". An Allied air raid in 1945 destroyed the brewery. After the war, an agreement was reached with the Schülein heirs, who had fled to the United States, to ensure the survival of the brewery. It resumed the export of beer in 1948—first to Switzerland. One of the family's descendants is American writer Danielle Steel.

Löwenbräu's market position in Upper Bavaria, and financing made possible by its large real estate holdings, helped drive worldwide sales of their beer. In North America, Löwenbräu came to be considered the archetype of Munich beer, as shown by its presence at the Montreal Expo in 1967.

In 1999, the North American rights to Löwenbräu passed to the Labatt Brewing Company, which began to brew Löwenbräu in Canada for both the Canadian and US markets with the same recipe used in Germany. Labatt's production of Löwenbräu ended in 2002 and exports of Munich Löwenbräu to North America resumed, although on a much smaller scale than had been the case before the Miller deal.

In 1997, Löwenbräu merged with Spaten-Franziskaner-Bräu to form the Spaten-Löwenbräu-Gruppe. Today, Löwenbräu has one of the oldest beer gardens in Munich.

== Oktoberfest ==
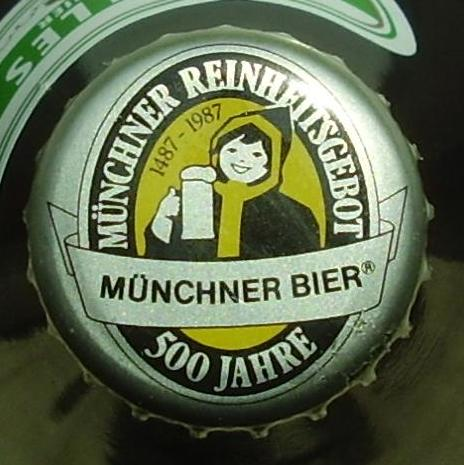
A bottle cap celebrating the 500th anniversary of the Reinheitsgebot

Löwenbräu beer has been served at every Oktoberfest in Munich since 1810. Because only beers that are brewed in Munich are permitted to be sold at Oktoberfest, Löwenbräu is one of six breweries represented, along with Augustinerbräu, Hofbräu, Hacker-Pschorr, Paulaner, and Spaten. For the Oktoberfest, Löwenbräu brews a special Märzen beer called Oktoberfestbier or Wiesenbier ("meadow beer," referring to the Bavarian name of the festival site, the "Wiesn"). Two of the large tents at Oktoberfest, the Löwenbräu-Festhalle and the Schützenfestzelt, are sponsored by Löwenbräu.

Oktoberfest beer, also known as Münchner Bier ("Munich beer"), is a registered trademark of the Club of Munich Brewers; Bavarian beer (Bayrisches Bier) and Munich beer in particular (Münchner Bier) are protected by the European Union as a PGI.

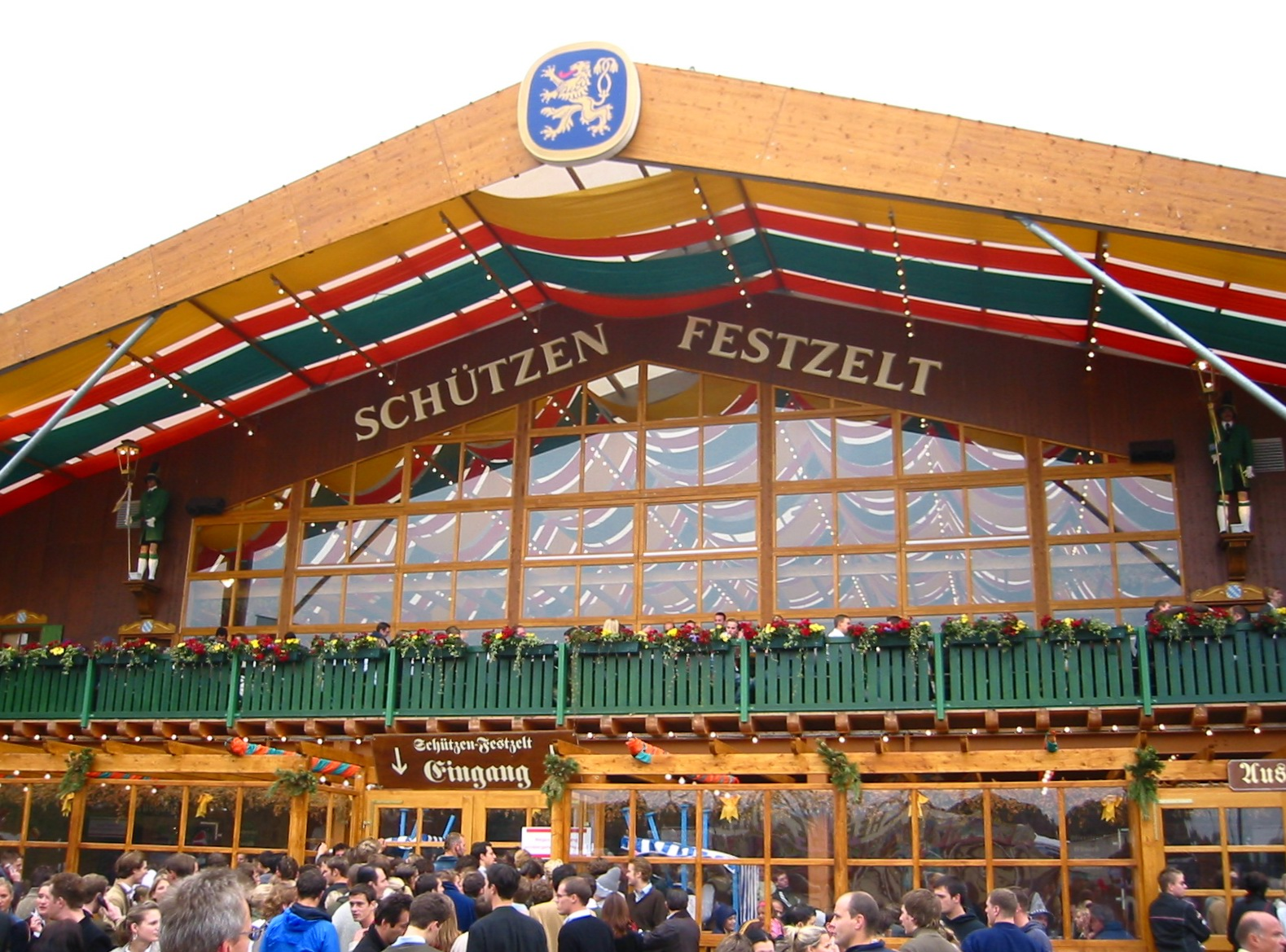
The Schützenfestzelt tent at Oktoberfest 2005

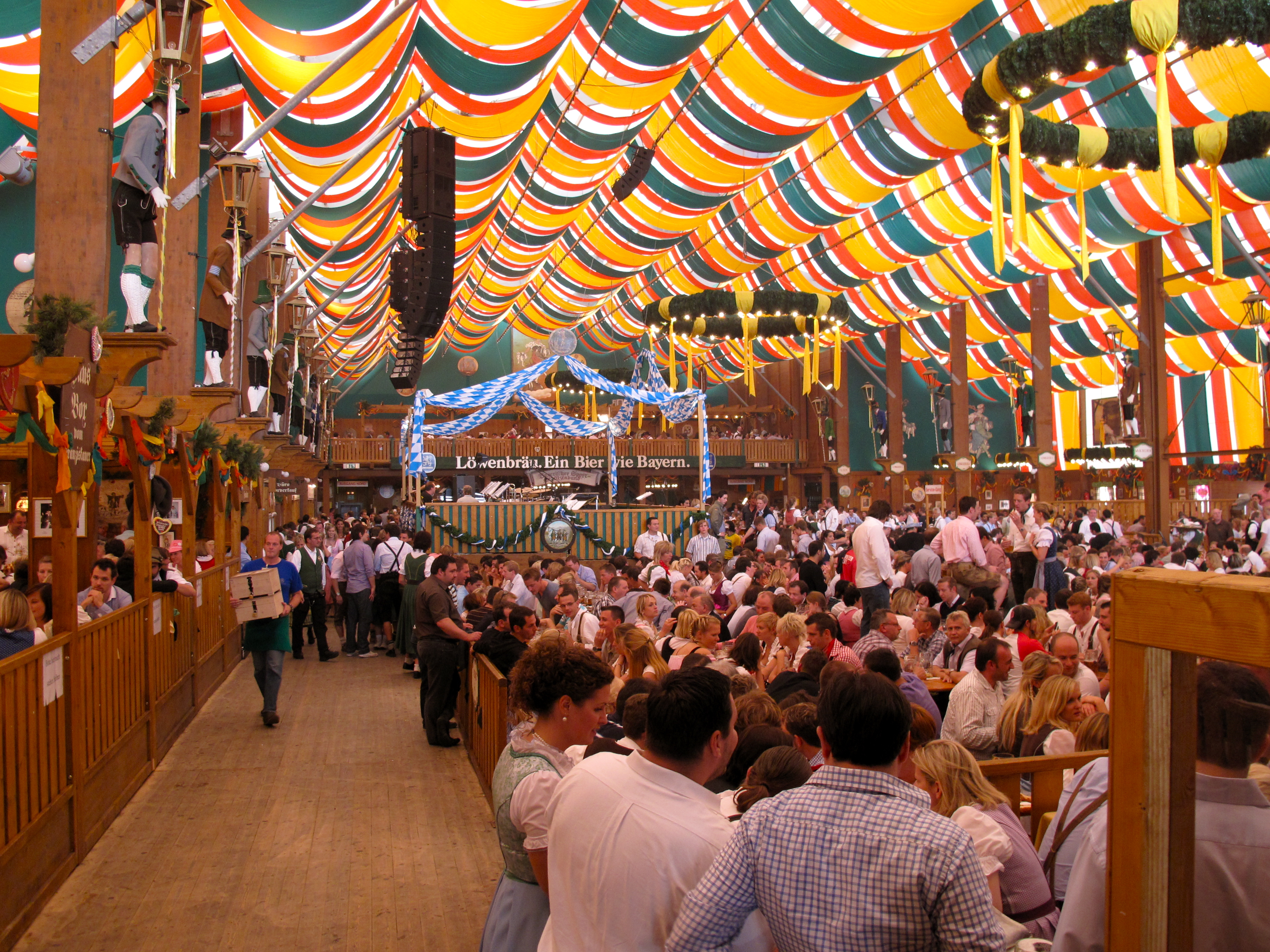
The Löwenbräu-Festhalle inside at Oktoberfest 2009

== Beers ==
- Löwenbräu Original for Export
- Löwenbräu Münchner Hell: a Munich Helles (5.2% ABV)
- Löwenbräu Münchner Dunkel: a dark lager (5.5% ABV)
- Löwenbräu Triumphator: a doppelbock (7.5% ABV)
- Löwenbräu Alkoholfrei: a non-alcoholic beer
- Löwenbräu Urtyp: a traditional helles (5.4% ABV)
- Löwenbräu Pils (formerly "der Löwenbräu"): the hoppiest of Munich's pilsners (5.4% ABV)
- Löwenbräu Dunkle Weisse: a hefeweizen (5.2% ABV)
- Löwenbräu Löwen Weisse Hell: a hefeweizen (5.2% ABV)
- Löwenbräu Radler Beer: a radler (2.5% ABV)
- Löwenbräu Oktoberfestbier: a Märzen brewed for Oktoberfest (6.1% ABV)

== See also ==
- List of brewing companies in Germany
