= Münchener Bier =

German beer

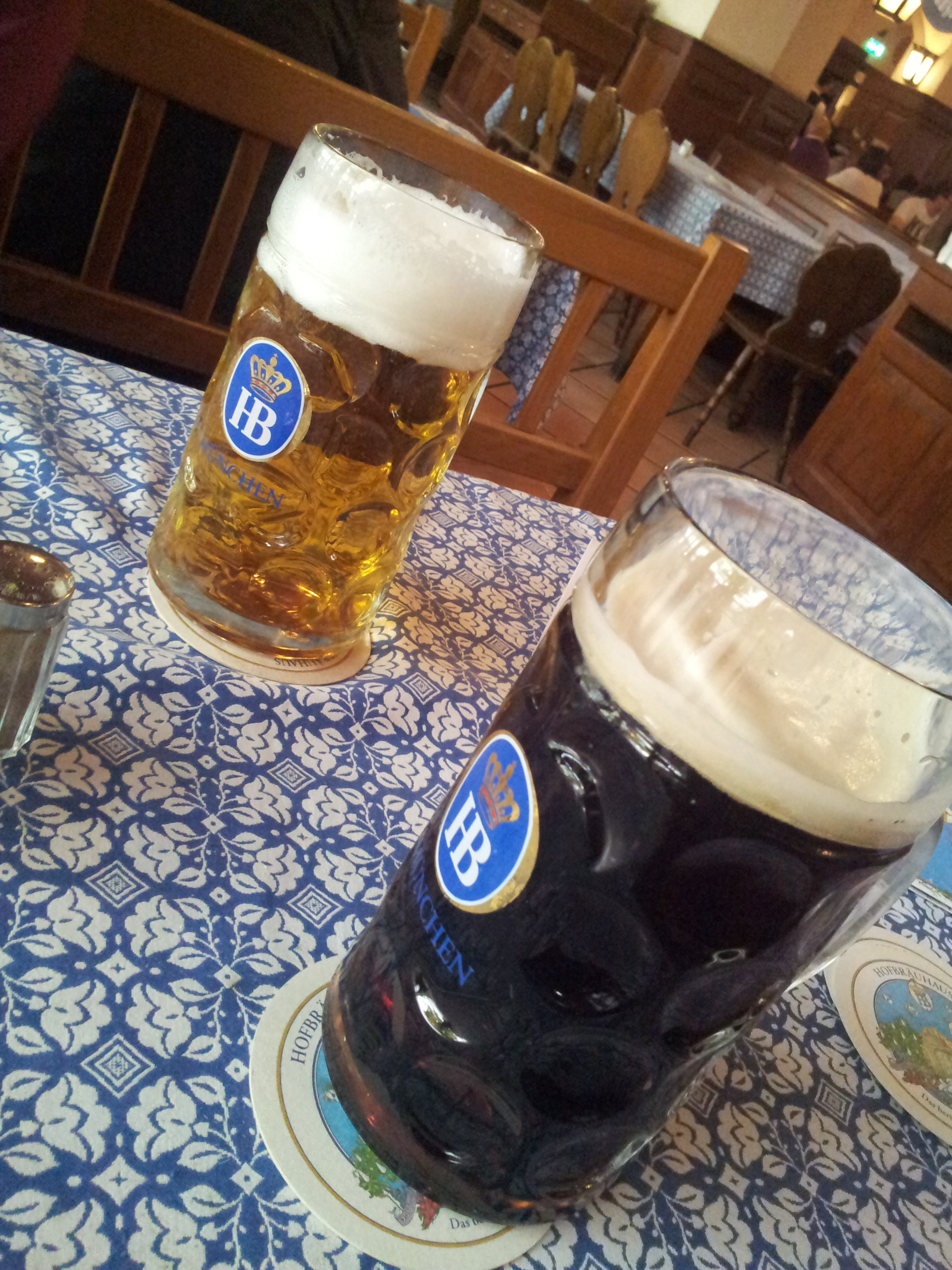
Typical beers of the PGI, from Hofbräu München

Münchener Bier is a beer from Germany that is protected under EU law with PGI status, first published under relevant laws in 1998. This designation was one of six German beers registered with the PGI designation at the time.

== History ==
Munich has had a long history of brewing beer; some have traced the starting point of this brewing tradition to the foundation of the Munich Court Brewery by William V, Duke of Bavaria (who opened his own hofbrauhaus in Munich in 1602). The reputation of Munich beers was celebrated in publications as early as 1816.

== Production description ==
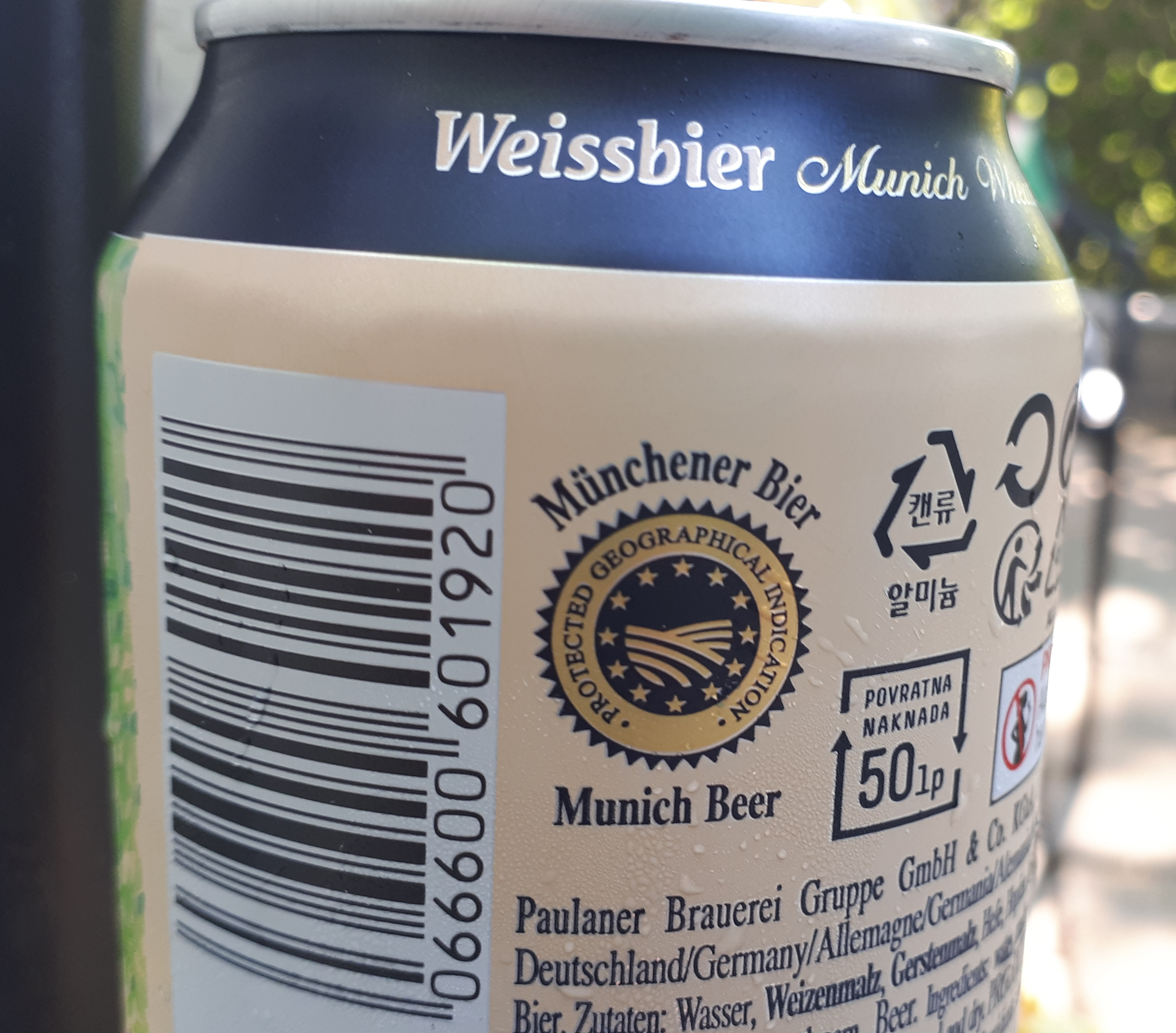
PGI logo on a Munich Wheat beer from Canada

The beer is produced using water taken from deep wells within the city of Munich, which is drawn through layers of slate formed millions of years ago. The water is mixed with coarsely ground malted cereal; this produces a “mash” that is stirred constantly while being heated to different temperature levels. The process of heating activates enzymes in the malt, making its components readily soluble. The mixture is then “lautered” (which involves filtering the wort and removing insoluble materials), then adding hops and boiling the mixture for one to two hours. This helps create the specific flavor profile of the beer, breaking down the hops and removing proteins that are detrimental to the taste.

The still-hot wort (free of solids) is then taken to fermentation vessels where yeast is added. The yeast used is derived from a single cell, ensuring consistent properties from one batch to the next. Fermentation takes place over the next four to eight days. The sugars in the resulting mixture are converted into alcohol and carbon dioxide (each about a third of the mixture) with unfermented malt accounting for the remainder.

Once this initial fermentation is complete, the remaining yeast is removed and the beer is placed into secondary fermentation tanks. Over the next four to eleven weeks, this secondary fermentation gradually matures the beer and it is then ready to be bottled or put into kegs. The entire beer-making process must take place within the city of Munich.
