= Hacker-Pschorr Brewery =

Brewery in Munich, Bavaria, Germany

- Native name: Hacker-Pschorr Bräu GmbH
- Industry: Brewery
- Founded: 1417
- Successor: Hackerbräu
- Headquarters: Munich, Germany
- Key people: CEO: Dr. Jörg Lehmann; Andreas Steinfatt
- Owner: Paulaner Brauerei Gruppe GmbH & Co. KGaA
- Website: www.hacker-pschorr.com

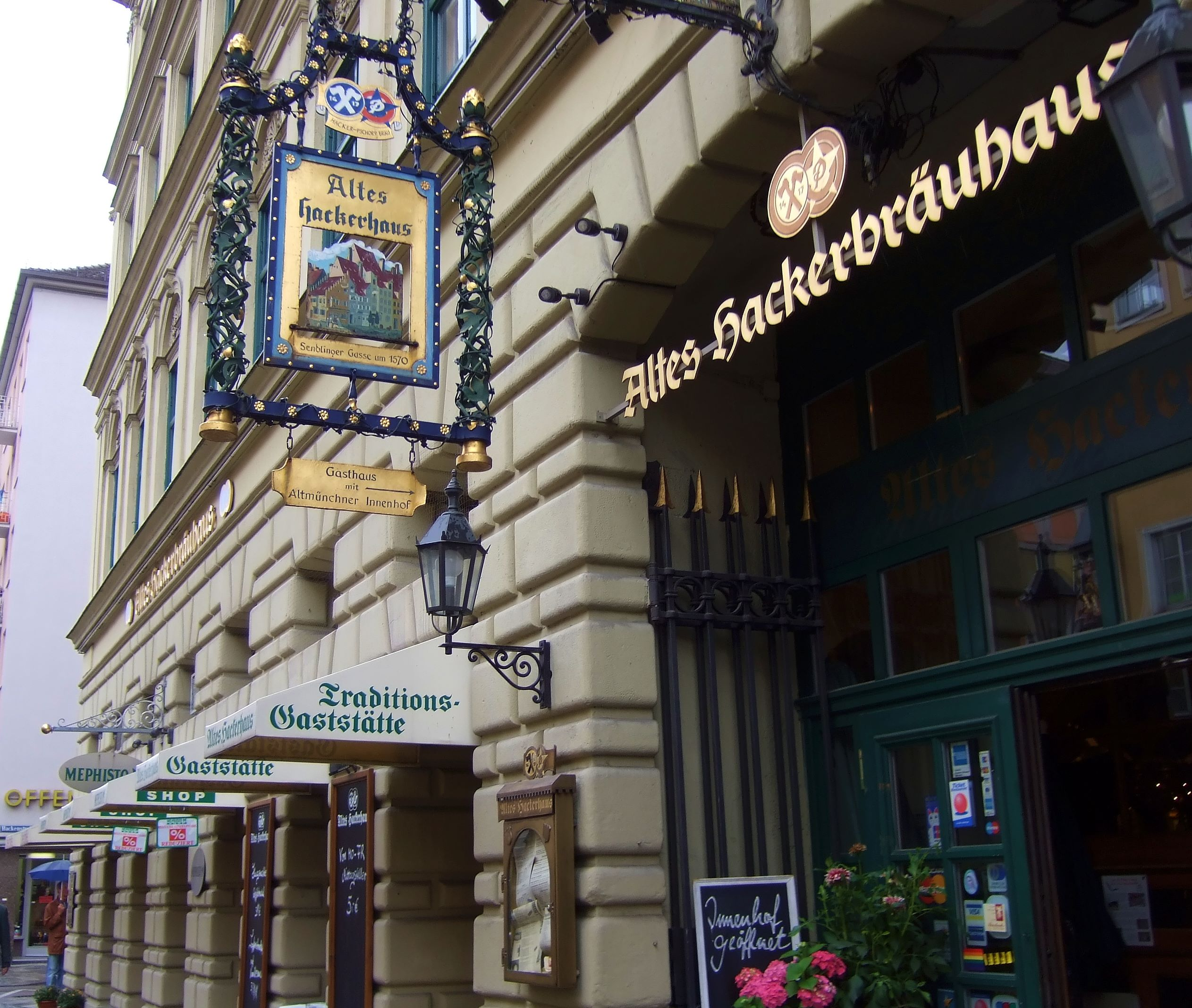
Altes Hackerhaus, the house-restaurant of Hacker

Hacker-Pschorr is a brewery in Munich, formed in 1972 out of the merger of two breweries, Hacker and Pschorr. Hacker was founded in 1417, nearly a century before the enactment of the Reinheitsgebot beer purity law of 1516.

As one of six breweries located within Munich's city limits, its beers are among those served at Oktoberfest.

== History ==
In the late 18th century, Joseph Pschorr (1770–1841) bought the Hacker brewery from his father-in-law Peter-Paul Hacker. He subsequently founded a separate brewery under his own name.

In the early 19th century, Joseph Pschorr and Maria Theresia Hacker established Hacker-Pschorr as one of the biggest breweries in Munich. In 1813, they built the Hacker-Keller in Landsbergerstraße in Munich, the biggest storage cellar in Germany. The huge brewing and storage cellar is 4,000 square meters in size and has a storage area of over 35,000 hectoliters. When Joseph Pschorr died, his two sons Georg Pschorr and Matthias Pschorr Sr. divided his estate by each assuming one of the two separate breweries.

In 1864 Georg Pschorr Jr. became the owner and assumed management of the Pschorr Brewery. During nearly 21 years of uninterrupted construction, he realized his lifelong goal – to build a new large brewery with the most advanced equipment. The Pschorr Brewery was then an industrial company with an annual output that would triple in the coming years.

In 1972, Hacker and Pschorr merged to form Hacker-Pschorr.

In 2007, Hacker-Pschorr was the first Munich brewery to switch the bottles for its full range of beers to use traditional swing tops.

== Oktoberfest ==
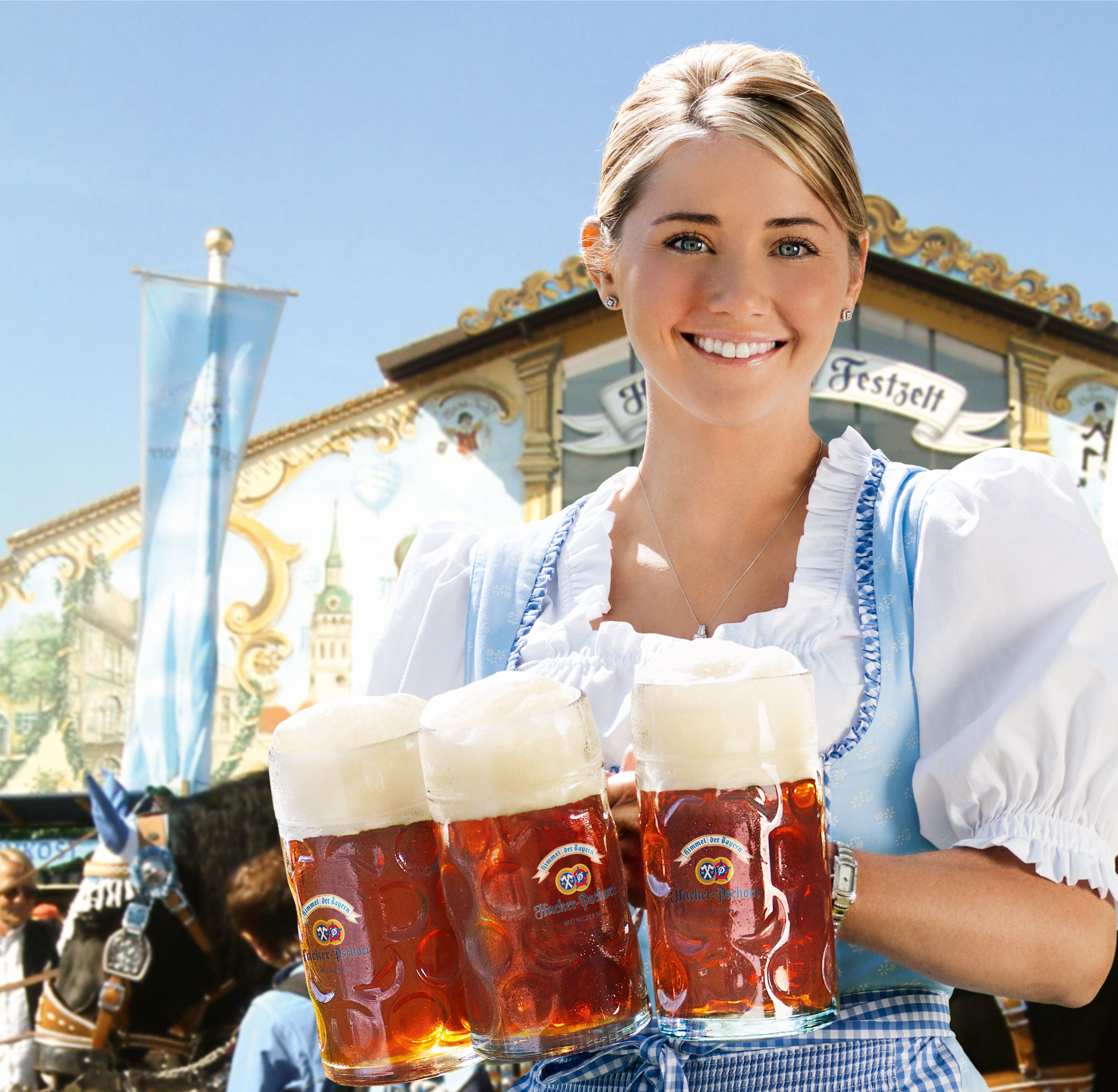
A hostess serves litre-sized glass mugs (Maßkrüge) of Hacker-Pschorr beer during the 2011 Oktoberfest.

When Crown Prince Ludwig I of Bavaria was about to celebrate his wedding in Munich in 1810, he decided it was an occasion for all of Bavaria to celebrate. He commissioned Josef Pschorr, then the brewmaster of the Hacker-Pschorr brewery, among other Munich brewers, to develop special brews to commemorate the occasion.

Subsequent annual celebrations evolved into the city of Munich’s Oktoberfest, which is attended by over six million people each year, who in 2011 consumed over six million litres of beer. By Munich law, only the six breweries within the city limits of Munich are invited to serve their beer at Oktoberfest. Hacker-Pschorr is one of the six, as is its sister brand, Paulaner. Today’s event is held on land donated by Josef Pschorr.

The Hacker-Pschorr brewery serves various tents at the Oktoberfest such as Hacker-Festzelt and Pschorr Bräurosl as well as Herzkasperl-Festzelt at the Oide Wiesn. In both first tents the beer is distributed to the bars using a modern beer ring line. In Herzkasperl-Festzelt traditional oak barrels are used.

== Beers ==
Hacker-Pschorr produces 13 different products, some of them are only seasonally available. Hacker-Pschorr Weisse is the company's flagship beer.

=== Sold in Germany ===
- Münchner Hell
- Münchener Gold
- Hell Alkoholfrei
- Münchner Dunkel
- Münchner Radler
- Natur Radler
- Natur Radler Alkoholfrei
- Oktoberfest Märzen
- Animator: Naturtrüber Doppelbock
- Kellerbier
- Superior
- Hefe Weisse
- Stern Weisse

=== Sold in United States ===
- Munich Gold (Münchener Gold)
- Weisse (Hefe Weisse)
- Weisse Dark (Dunkel Weisse)
- Hubertus Bock
- Original Oktoberfest (Oktoberfest Märzen)
- Munich Dark (Münchner Dunkel)

== Distribution ==
Prior to 2009, Hacker-Pschorr was imported to the U.S. via Star Brand Imports, based in White Plains, New York and part of Heineken International. In 2009, Paulaner HP USA (formerly Distinguished Brands) of Littleton, Colorado, took over the import business of Hacker-Pschorr and Paulaner in the United States.

== Awards and recognition ==
The Beer from Hacker Pschorr brewery received an award at the 1876 World Exhibition in Philadelphia.
