= List of regional beverages of the United States =

The following is a list of notable beverages associated with (and often limited to) specific regions of the United States. See also: List of regional dishes of the United States.

== Non-alcoholic drinks ==
Image	Drink Name	Associated Region	Description
Ale-8-One	Ale-8-One	Kentucky	A ginger and citrus blend, containing less carbonation and fewer calories than conventional soda, Ale-8-One was first sold in 1920s Prohibition-era Kentucky—according to the company, thirsty locals used it as a mixer to improve the taste of bootleg liquor. Often abbreviated as Ale-8, the name Ale-8-One is itself a pun on the original title; it was originally called "A Late One" after a contest was held at a county fair to name the beverage.
Apple Beer	Apple Beer	Utah	Non-alcoholic and uncaffeinated, this Salt Lake City brew is an American variant of the Bavarian Fassbrause. It is commonly used as a non-alcoholic alternative for celebratory toasts (in Utah, religious abstinence from both alcohol and caffeine is not uncommon).
Big Red	Big Red (soft drink)	Texas, Southern United States	A sweet red cream soda created in Waco, Texas. Also has a cult following in the Louisville Kentucky and Southern Indiana regions. Has a unique flavor combining vanilla, citrus, and bubblegum.
Birch Beer	Birch beer	Northeastern United States	A carbonated soft drink made from herbal extracts and birch bark or sap. Most commonly found in the Northeastern United States, Alaska, and Canada, birch beer is sold by dozens of brands.
Boost!	Boost!	New Jersey (especially Burlington County)	Boost! is a non-carbonated fruit syrup first sold in 1913 under the name Tak-Aboost. Boost! has been described as having a taste like "flat Coke." While it can be hard to find on store shelves outside of South Jersey, the company ships thousands of gallons worldwide each year.
Boston Cooler	Boston Cooler	Detroit	Boston Coolers were invented in the Boston-Edison neighborhood of Detroit. They are made with softened vanilla ice cream and ginger ale—purists insist on the local Michigan brand Vernors. Unlike a traditional ice cream float, Boston Coolers are blended thick like a milkshake.
Cactus Cooler	Cactus Cooler	Southwestern United States	Orange-Pineapple flavored soft drink created in 1966 by Canada Dry, now sold by Keurig Dr Pepper. It is primarily sold in Southern California but can sometimes be found in Arizona, Nevada, and New Mexico.
Cel-Ray	Cel-Ray	New York City and Florida	First produced in 19th-century Brooklyn, Cel-Ray is a kosher, carbonated celery-flavored soft drink. Derived from celery seed extract, it is commonly found in Jewish delicatessens in New York City and South Florida.
Cheerwine	Cheerwine	Southeastern United States	A cherry-flavored soft drink that has been made by the Carolina Beverage Corporation since 1917.
Chicory Coffee	Chicory Coffee	Southern United States	In the 1840s, the port of New Orleans was America's second-largest importer of coffee (after New York). When Union naval blockades interrupted the flow of coffee into Confederate New Orleans during the American Civil War, Louisianans began to add chicory root to their coffee as a substitute—thus starting a tradition that continues to this day.
Coca-Cola	Coca-Cola and Peanuts	Southern United States	This Southern recipe is a simple one: open a glass of Coca-Cola and just drop a few shelled, salted peanuts into the bottle. The sweetness of the soda pairs with the salt from the peanuts.
Coffee milk	Coffee milk	The official state drink of Rhode Island	A drink made by mixing coffee syrup or coffee extract and milk together
Date Milkshake	Date shake	Palm Springs, California & Coachella Valley	A milkshake made with dates; the local climate is ideal for growing date palm trees.
Dr. Enuf	Dr. Enuf	Tennessee	Dr. Enuf is a vitamin-enriched lemon-lime soft drink that is widely available in the Tri-Cities of Northeast Tennessee.
Dr. Nut	Dr. Nut	New Orleans	No longer in production, Dr. Nut was a New Orleans soft drink with a distinct almond flavor, similar to Amaretto. It was immortalized in John Kennedy O'Toole's novel A Confederacy of Dunces as Ignatius J. Reilly's favorite beverage.
Egg Cream	Egg cream	New York City	Made with neither eggs nor cream, this fountain beverage was invented in Brooklyn and is usually made with chocolate syrup, seltzer and milk.
Faygo	Faygo	Michigan, Midwestern United States, Mid-Atlantic (United States) and South Central United States	A soft drink manufactured in Detroit that has been mentioned in several rap songs, most notably by Insane Clown Posse.
	Grapico	Alabama	Grapico is a caffeine-free, artificially flavored carbonated soft drink with a purple color and a grape taste sold in the Southeastern United States since 1916—but it's particularly associated with its home state of Alabama. Grapico is mentioned in Fried Green Tomatoes at the Whistle Stop Cafe, 1987 best selling novel by Fannie Flagg.
	Green Chile Lemonade	New Mexico	Green chile is an integral component of New Mexico's cuisine—so much so that you can even find lemonade with green chile in it.
	Green River	Illinois	Green River is frequently marketed as a nostalgia item, and its sales increase in March due to the association of the color green with St. Patrick's Day (when the Chicago River turns into a literal green river.) While not widely commercially available, it can be purchased at some Chicago area restaurants and retailers. According to Creedence Clearwater Revival frontman John Fogerty, this drink was the inspiration for the song Green River.
Ironport	Ironport	Intermountain West states including Utah, Idaho, Montana, Wyoming, and Nevada.	Described as somewhat of a cross between root beer and Caribbean spices, or root beer and cream soda, ironport (or iron port) is a style of beverage created in the early 20th century and still available at soda fountains in the Western United States.
Kona Coffee	Kona Coffee	Hawaii	Kona coffee is the market name for coffee (Coffea arabica) cultivated on the slopes of Hualalai and Mauna Loa in the North and South Kona Districts of the Big Island of Hawaii. It is one of the most expensive coffees in the world. According to Hawaiian law, only coffee from the Kona Districts can be described as "Kona."
Manhattan Special	Manhattan Special	New York City	Manhattan Special, made with espresso beans, seltzer water and sugar, has adorned New York City store shelves for over a century. Created in 1895 by Italian immigrant Michael Garavuso, the company's petite glass bottles were once carried to market from their Manhattan Avenue, Brooklyn bottling plant by horse and buggy.
Byrne Dairy	Mint Milk	New York State (around Syracuse)	You can find mint milk in central New York grocery stores every spring. The green, mint-flavored milk, produced by Byrne Dairy, is a Saint Patrick's Day-themed treat.
Moxie	Moxie	Maine, New England and Houston	One of the first mass-produced soft drinks in the United States, this carbonated Gentian-root extract beverage is the official soft drink of Maine.
	Piñon coffee	New Mexico	Pine nut coffee, known as piñón (Spanish for pine nut), is a specialty found in the southwest United States, especially New Mexico, and is typically a dark roast coffee having a deep, nutty flavor; roasted and lightly salted pine nuts can often be found sold on the side of the road in cities across New Mexico to be used for this purpose, as well as a snack.
	POG (Passion Orange Guava)	Hawaii	POG juice is a tropical beverage from the Hawaiian islands made with equal parts passion fruit, orange, and guava juices (hence the name POG). POG was created in 1971 by a food product consultant named Mary Soon, who worked for Haleakala Dairy in Maui. Haleakala Dairy's flat cardboard bottle caps became the inspiration for the popular 1990s game POG.
Ski soda bottles	Ski	Although the origins to Ski have no known connection to the city of Evansville, Indiana, the product is very popular there, and has become a significant part of the local culture.	A citrus soda made using orange and lemon juice
Sweet tea	Sweet tea	Southern United States	A sugary Southern variant of iced tea.
Switchel	Switchel	New England	Switchel—made with apple cider vinegar, ginger, water, and a sweetener like molasses or maple syrup—has been enjoyed by New Englanders for hundreds of years. Colonial-era farm workers, seeking refreshment on hot harvest days, drank switchel out of stone jugs that they kept in the shade. Switchel can be either non-alcoholic or mixed with spirits. In recent years there has been renewed interest in the beverage.
Vernors ginger ale	Vernors	For most of its history, Vernors was a regional product available throughout Michigan and in major regional cities such as Toledo, Cleveland, and Buffalo. It is also popular in Canada, having been sold at Ontario soda fountains from the 1920s onward, and with bottling facilities, soda fountains and outlets located in Southwestern Ontario. It was not mass distributed nationally in the U.S. until the 2000s.	Ginger soda

== Alcoholic drinks ==
Image	Drink Name	Associated regions	Description
	Allen's Coffee Brandy	Maine and New England	Allen's Coffee Brandy is a coffee-flavoured liqueur popular in New England, especially Maine, where it was the best-selling liquor product from the mid-2000s to 2018 (when it was unseated by Fireball Cinnamon Whisky).
	Boilo	Pennsylvania	Boilo, a variation of a traditional Lithuanian liqueur called "Krupnik" or "Krupnikas," is a spiced citrus drink traditionally enjoyed at Christmastime in Pennsylvania coal country.
	Cohasset Punch	Chicago	Cohasset Punch is a brand of rum-based drink first created by Chicago bartenders Lewis Williams and Tom Newman in the 1890s. Officially classified as a liqueur, Cohasset Punch can also be considered a bottled cocktail or punch. It has been referred to as "the definitive Chicago cocktail", and a 1902 trade journal remarked that "what the mint julep is to the South, Cohasset Punch is to Chicago." Cohasset Punch was produced until the late-1980s, and was relaunched under new ownership in 2024.
	Crémas	Miami	A creamy Haitian drink that can be found in Little Haiti, a section of Miami. Similar to an eggnog, this drink is made with milk, coconut, rum and other ingredients. Also spelled Kremas or Crémasse.
	Horsefeather	Invented in Lawrence, Kansas in the 1990s, it remains a regional drink in the Kansas City region.	A cocktail traditionally prepared using rye whiskey or blended whiskey, ginger beer, three dashes of Angostura bitters, and a little lemon juice.
Hurricane	Hurricane	New Orleans	The hurricane cocktail is a sweet alcoholic drink made with rum, lemon juice, and passion fruit syrup. It is one of many popular drinks served in New Orleans. It is traditionally served in the tall, curvy eponymous "hurricane glass." Disposable plastic cups are also used for while New Orleans laws permit drinking in public and leaving a bar with a drink, it prohibits public drinking from glass containers.
	Jeppson's Malört	Chicago	Malört, a brand of bäsk, is a wormwood-based Swedish liquor found in Chicago. Due to its exceptionally bitter taste, many imbibers experience "Malört face" on first sampling the drink.
Mint julep	Mint julep	Kentucky	Mint julep's are a cocktail consisting of Bourbon, sugar, water, and fresh mint, sometimes spearmint. It is known as the official drink of the Kentucky Derby.
Mojito	Mojito	Miami	Mojitos are a rum-based highball cocktail, of Cuban origins, most commonly associated with South Florida.
Moonshine	Moonshine	Appalachia, Southern United States	A clear and unaged corn mash whiskey most commonly associated with Appalachian & Southeastern states. "White lightning" was both illegal and in great demand during Prohibition.
	National Bohemian	Baltimore	Nearly 90% of 'Natty Boh' sales are in Baltimore, Maryland where this pilsener beer was originally brewed.
	Nutcracker	New York City	Nutcrackers are illegal, generally homemade liquor & juice drinks sold by New York City street vendors. You might hear bootleggers hawking their wares (shouting "Nutcracker!") at city beaches.
Ramos Gin Fizz	Ramos gin fizz	New Orleans	A frothy cocktail made famous by Louisiana Governor Huey Long. Legend has it that Huey brought his New Orleans bartender with him on a business trip to New York because he couldn't do without his Ramos as perfected by his favorite bartender. He called it “his gift to New York.”
Sazerac	Sazerac	New Orleans	A cocktail made with rye, absinthe or Herbsaint, Peychaud's Bitters, and sugar. The state of Louisiana named Sazerac the official cocktail of New Orleans in 2008.
Rum and Diet Coca-Cola	Cuba Libre	Atlanta, Georgia	A dark fizzy soda and a splash of rum, popular among Floridian cruisers. You might hear a bargoer order "D.C. with rum," which refers to this drink.

== See also ==
- List of national drinks – a national drink is a distinct beverage that is strongly associated with a particular country, and can be part of their national identity and self-image
- List of beverages of the Southern United States
- List of regional dishes of the United States
- Prohibition in the United States
