= Fassbrause =

German fruit beer

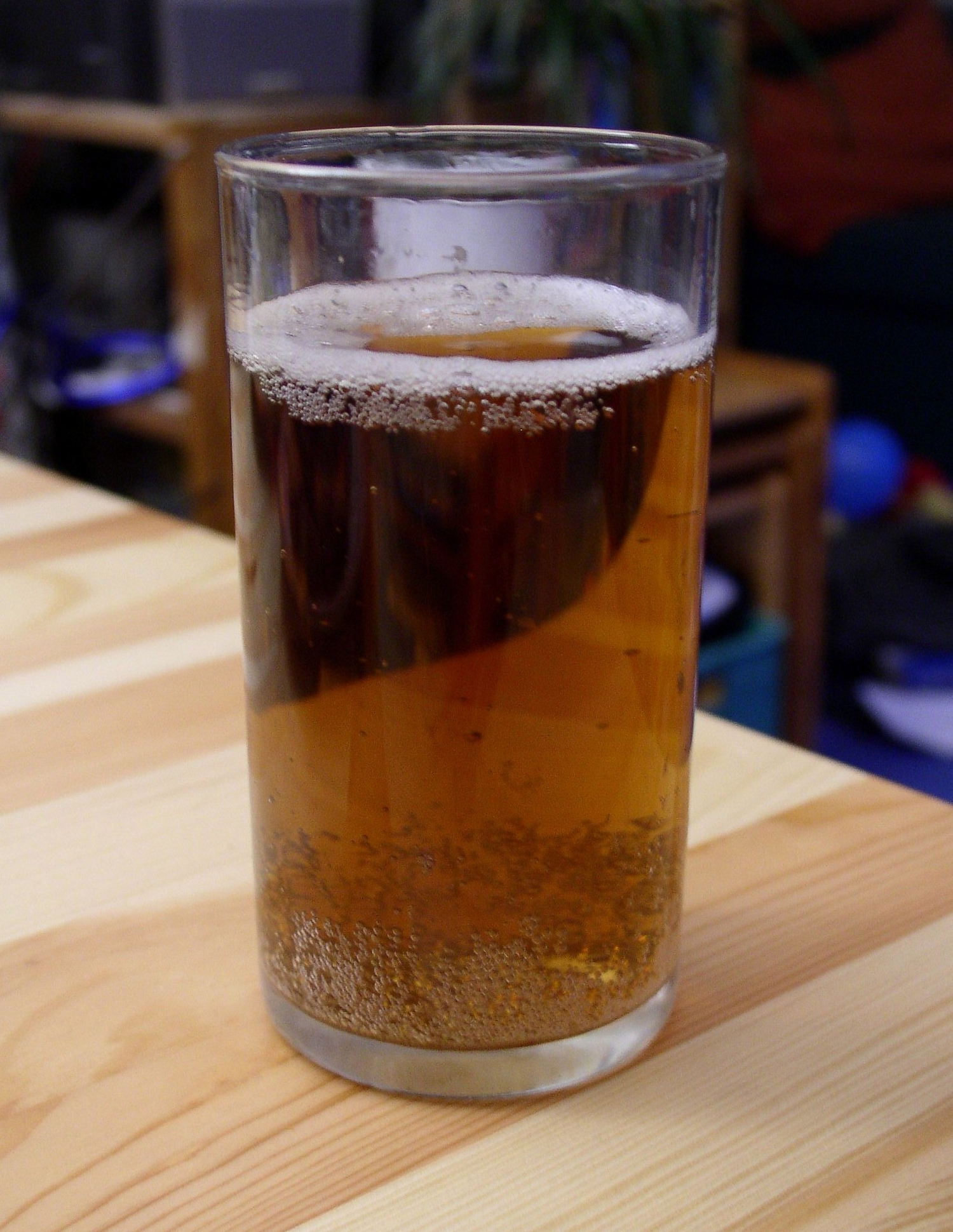
- A glass of Fassbrause
- Type: Non-alcoholic beer
- Origin: Berlin, Germany
- Introduced: 1908
- Colour: Beer coloured
- Flavour: Apple-like
- Ingredients: Fruit and malt extract
- Variants: Rote Fassbrause
- Related products: Almdudler

Fassbrause [ˈfasˌbʁaʊzə], lit. draught sherbet or keg soda, is a non-alcoholic or alcoholic (depending on the brand) German drink made from fruit and malt extract, traditionally stored in a keg. The original Fassbrause also includes spices and is a speciality of Berlin, where it is sometimes called Sportmolle. (Molle used to be a term for beer in the Berlin dialect.)

Fassbrause generally has a light golden colour and an apple flavour. The taste is strongly reminiscent of the Austrian drink Almdudler, except that Fassbrause is less sweet, and not quite as spicy.

A variant of Fassbrause, the so-called Rote Fassbrause (red keg soda), which is available in some of the new states, but not in Berlin itself, appeared in the 1950s. This variant was available in the German Democratic Republic (GDR) prior to German Reunification and has a raspberry flavour.

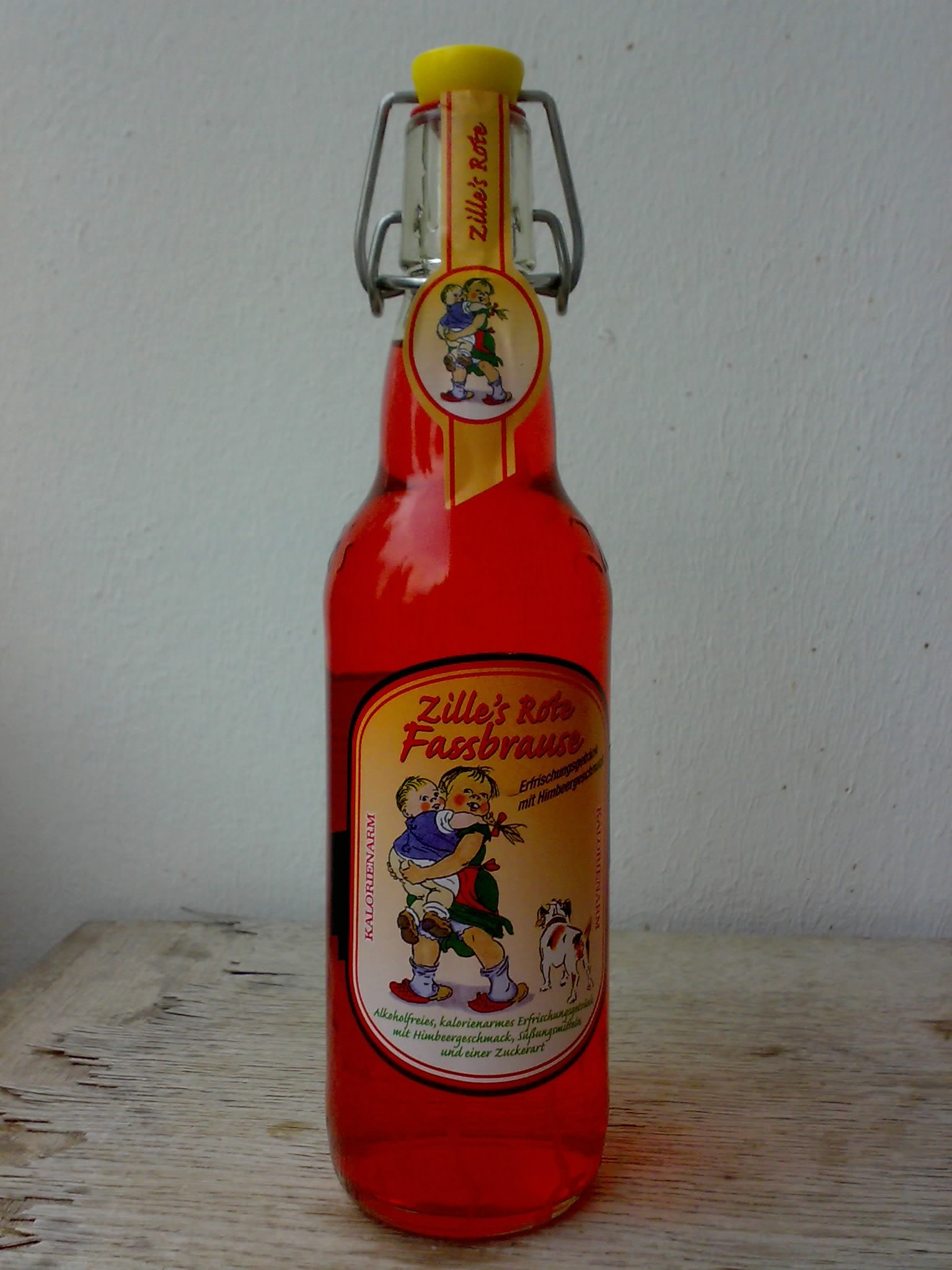
Zille's Fassbrause

Another non-alcoholic variant has been produced in the United States since the 1960s under the name "Apple Beer".

As the term Fassbrause is not protected, completely altered variants with no direct link to the original Berlin recipe have been created and marketed starting in the 2010s. Cologne brewery Gaffel Becker & Co was the first to start with Gaffel Fassbrause in April 2010, and many big breweries followed. Since then, the term Fassbrause has been perceived ambiguously in Western and Eastern Germany, because many people in Western Germany were not aware of the original specialty from Berlin.

== History ==
The chemist Ludwig Scholvien invented Fassbrause in 1908 in Berlin for his son, in order to offer a non-alcoholic beer substitute of similar colour and taste. Scholvien's original recipe included a natural concentrate of apple and licorice, intended to approximate the beer taste, along with the main ingredients of water and malt. A drink based on Scholvien's recipe, known as Apple Beer, was introduced in the US in the 1960s. Wild GmbH & Co. KG began producing the Fassbrause concentrate in Spandau after acquiring a factory in 1985. It later sold the production to Dr. August Oetker KG. Today the drink is available on tap throughout Berlin as a specialty drink. It is also occasionally served mixed with beer; this mixture is known in Berlin and Brandenburg as Gespritztes.

The brand Rixdorfer, which produces its Fassbrause with water sourced from Bad Liebenwerda, produces a significant amount of the total market share for the drink. It distributes the drink in 0.33-liter bottles for the Berliner Kindl Brauerei. Another popular brand is the Berliner Fassbrause, distributed by Spreequell. Since August 2012 a caffeinated Fassbrause drink has also been distributed under the name Kreuzbär.

== Market availability ==
- Barre Fassbrause – Produced by Privatbrauerei Ernst Barre GmbH
- Fassbrause – Produced by Hansa-Brunnen AG
- Faßbrause – Produced by Einsiedler Brauhaus GmbH
- Gaffels Fassbrause – Produced by Privatbrauerei Gaffel Becker & Co OHG
- Rixdorfer Fassbrause – Produced by Berliner Kindl Brauerei AG
- Rote Brause from a keg using the original GDR recipe – Produced by Biercontor Wildberg
- Zille's Fassbrause – Produced by Neue Torgauer Brauhaus GmbH
- Krombacher's Fassbrause – Produced by Krombacher Brauerei
- Flens Fassbrause – Produced by Flensburger Brauerei
- Hartmannsdorfer Fassbrause – Produced by Brauhaus Hartmannsdorf GmbH

== See also ==
- Apple Beer
- Cider
- Hard soda
- List of soft drink flavors
- List of soft drinks by country
- Queen Mary (cocktail)
