= Horse feathers =

Horse feathers or horsefeathers may refer to:

== Arts ==
- Horse Feathers, a 1932 pre-Code comedy film starring the Marx Brothers
- Horse Feathers (band), an American indie folk band from Portland, Oregon

== Equestrian ==
- Deciduous hoof capsule, a covering on the hooves of newborn foals, sometimes called "horse feathers"
- Feathering (horse), long hair on the lower legs of some breeds of horse

== Other ==
- Horsefeather (cocktail) is also the name for a Whiskey cocktail
