= Brauerei zur Malzmühle =

Kölsch brewery in Cologne, Germany

Brauerei zur Malzmühle Schwartz GmbH & Co. KG
- Interactive map of Brauerei zur Malzmühle Schwartz GmbH & Co. KG
- Location: Heumarkt, Cologne, Germany
- Coordinates: 50°56′5″N 6°57′38″E
- Opened: 1858
- Annual production volume: 38,500 hectolitres (32,800 US bbl)
- Website: muehlenkoelsch.de

The Brauerei zur Malzmühle ("Brewery at the Malt Mill") is a Kölsch brewery located in Cologne, Germany. The brewery was founded in 1858 by Hubert Koch as the "Bier und Malzextrakt Dampfbrauerei Koch, Cöln" ("Beer and Malt Extract Steam Brewery, Cologne") located at the "Heumarkt" in Cologne. In 1912, the brewery was taken over by the brewer Gottfried Joseph Schwartz, who gave the brewery its current name.

The brewery's main product is "Mühlen Kölsch", a traditional top-fermented style of beer local to the city.
