= Cölner Hofbräu Früh =

German beer brewery

Cölner Hofbräu P. Josef Früh KG
- Interactive map of Cölner Hofbräu P. Josef Früh KG
- Location: Cologne, Germany
- Coordinates: 50°56′23″N 6°57′26″E
- Opened: 1904
- Annual production volume: 380,000 hectolitres (320,000 US bbl)

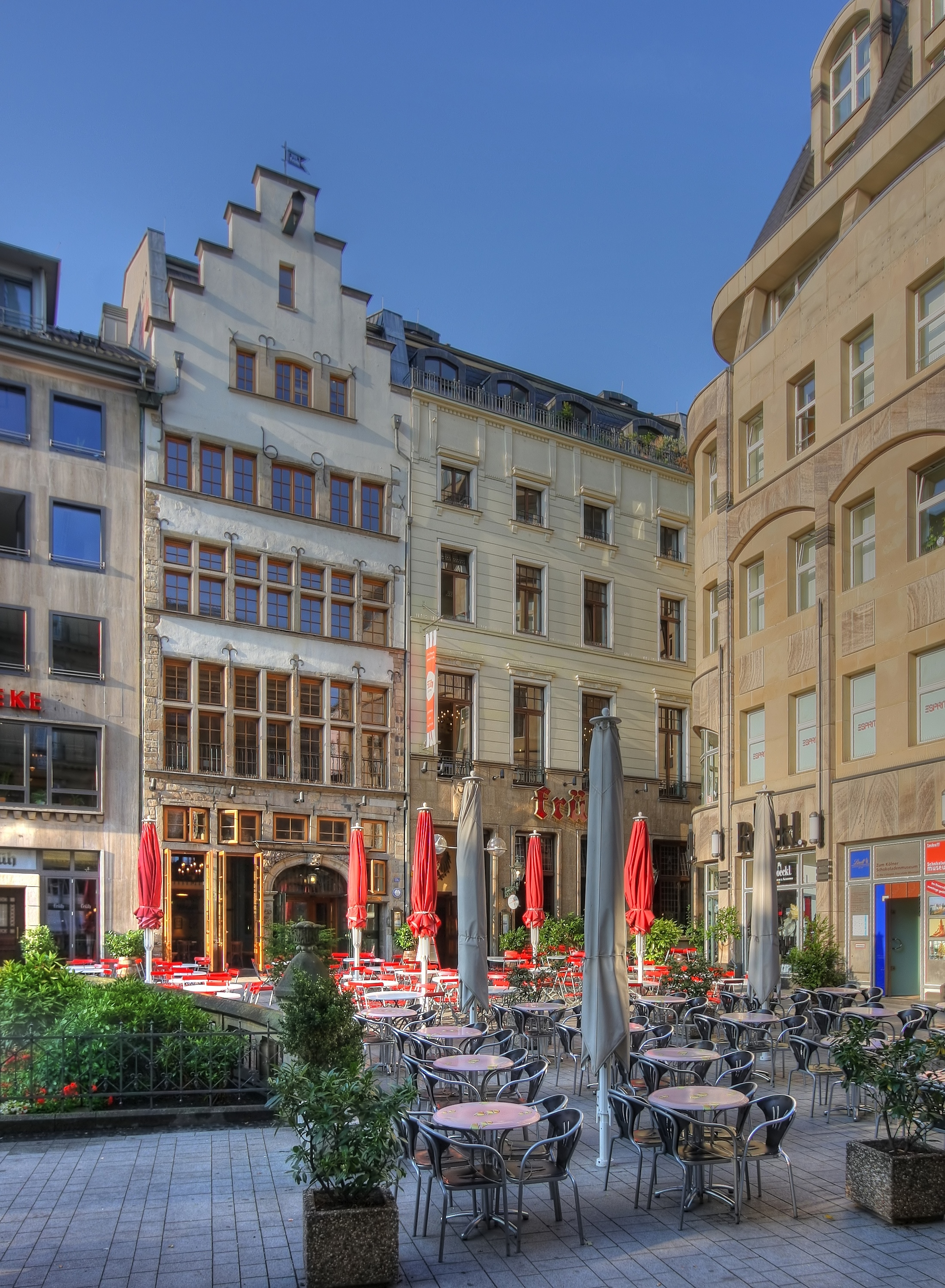
Brauhaus Früh (center left) in Cologne.

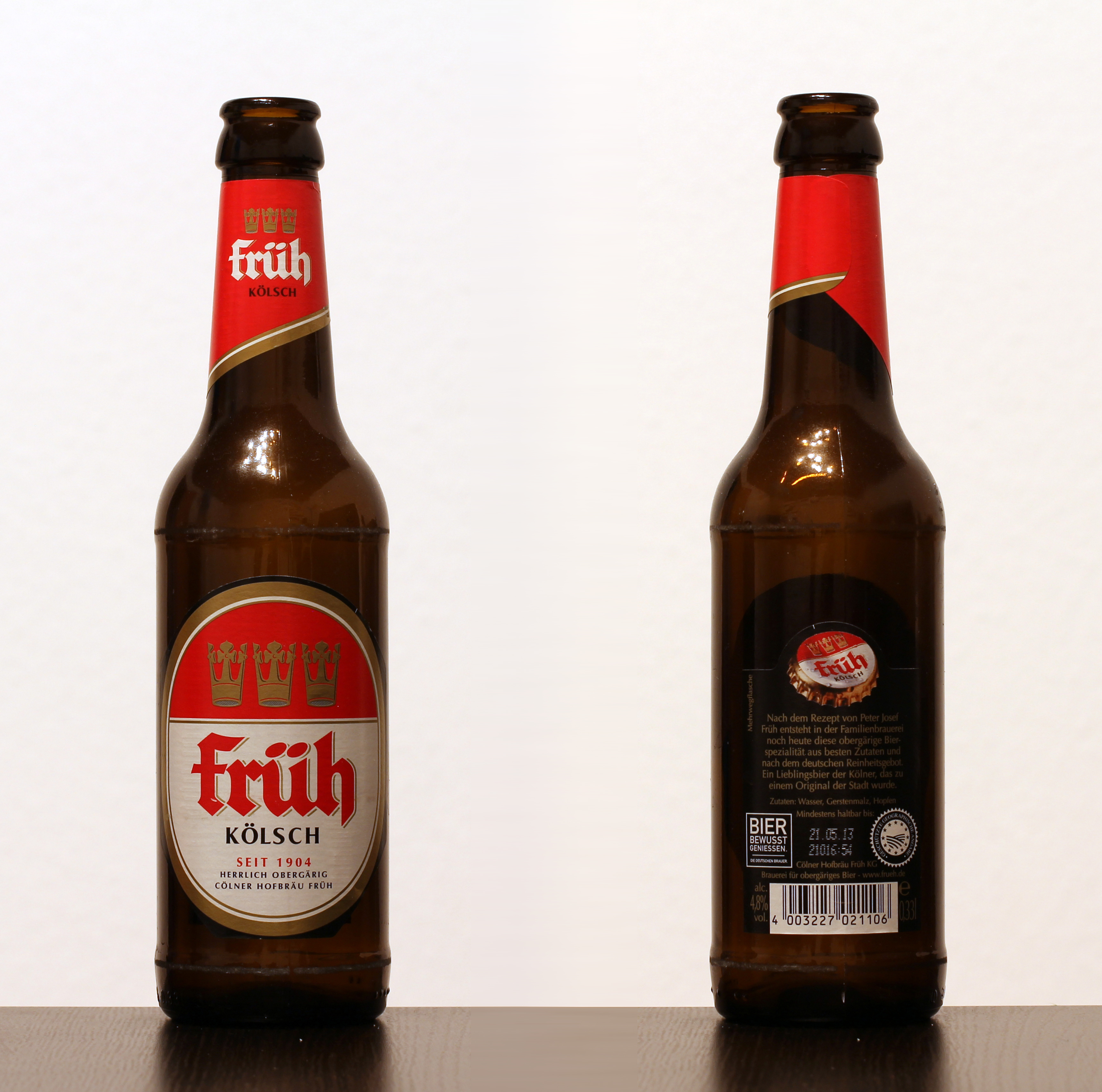
Früh Kolsch

Cölner Hofbräu Früh (German pronunciation: [ˈkœlnɐ ˈhoːfbʁɔʏ ˈfʁyː]; or just Früh) is a private brewery for top-fermented beer called Kölsch. The brewery was founded in Cologne in 1904 by Peter Joseph Früh. Since 1987, the beer is no longer brewed directly in the house, but in a brewing facility in Cologne-Feldkassel. The former brewery area and the former living quarters of the Früh family were redesigned and restored. In the medieval vaults of the fermentation and storage cellars, new guest rooms were created and on the second floor the Hofbräustuben for more sophisticated tastes.

In March 2019, Früh announced a cooperation with the company Haus Kölscher Brautradition GmbH. The subsidiary of the Radeberger Group will have all bottled beers produced at Früh's Feldkassel brewery from 2020 and all draft beers of the Sion, Gilden, Peters, Dom, Sester, and Küppers Kölsch brands from 2021.
