= Benjamin Faunce =

American druggist and businessman

- Born: Benjamin Rice Faunce Jr. 1873; Philadelphia, Pennsylvania, US
- Died: April 27, 1949 (aged 75–76)
- Occupation: Druggist
- Known for: Inventing Boost!
- Spouses: Mable C. Lewis; Maude F. Faunce
- Children: 3

Benjamin Rice Faunce Jr. (1873–1949) was an American druggist and businessman who created the soft drink Boost! and established the Boost! Company.

== Early life ==
Faunce was born in 1873 in Philadelphia, Pennsylvania, to Benjamin Rice Faunce and Clarinda Lockard.

== Career ==
Faunce later moved to Riverside, New Jersey where he became a licensed druggist in 1905. He sold remedies he had created such as headache capsules, cough syrup and toothpaste. Faunce reportedly set out to create a soft drink without bubbles and around 1910, invented a drink which he called "Tak-Aboost". He dispensed the drink in concentrated form from a soda fountain. In 1913, after years of experimenting with the drink, Faunce registered the brand as a trademark.

He formed the Boost! Company on May 15, 1915, for the purpose of manufacturing and selling the product. He opened "Boost" shops in places near Riverside such as Burlington and Palmyra. Faunce was president of the Boost Company until his death on April 27, 1949.

== Personal life ==
He was married to Mable C. Lewis and later Maude F. Faunce and had three sons called B. Paul Faunce, Randle B. Faunce and E. Lester Stockton, Sr. who were employees of the Boost! Company. Faunce's granddaughter Helen Faunce Anderson also worked for the company.
