= Boost! =

American non-carbonated cola brand

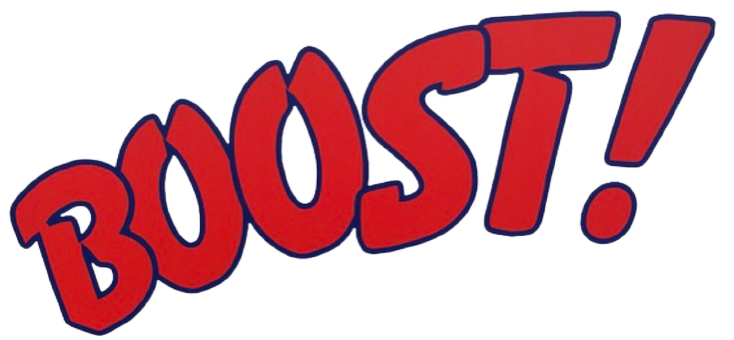

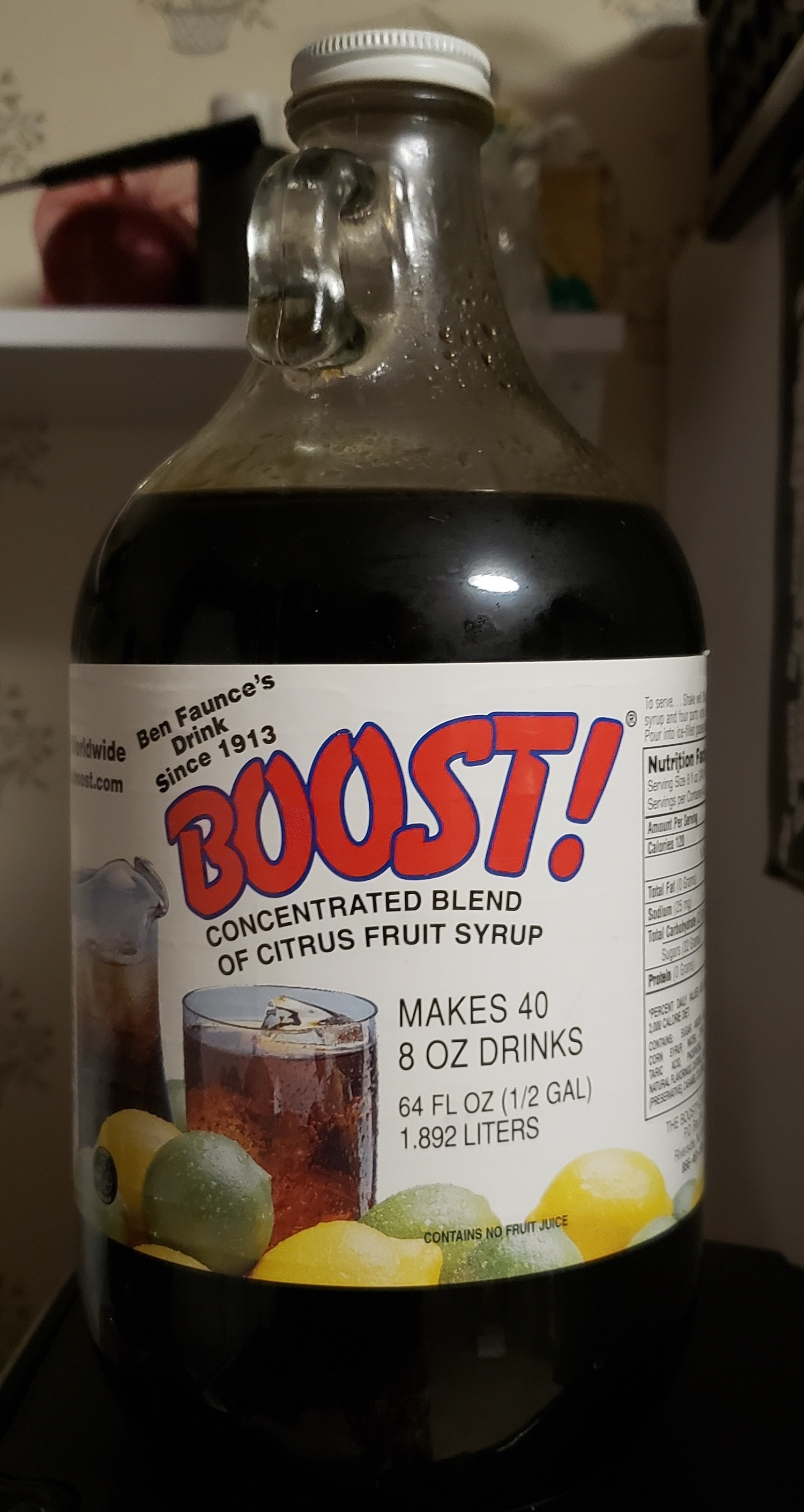
- Type: Soft drink
- Manufacturer: Boost! Company
- Origin: United States
- Introduced: 1913

Boost! is an American non-carbonated cola brand manufactured by the Boost! Company. The drink has been known as Tak-Aboost (Note: Tak-Aboost is alternatively spelled Tak-a-Boost, Tak-A-Boost, Tak-ABoostand Take A Boost.) and Drink-Atoast (Note: Drink-Atoast is alternatively spelled Atoast, Drink Atoast and Drink AToast.) throughout its history and is primarily sold in Burlington County, New Jersey.

== History ==
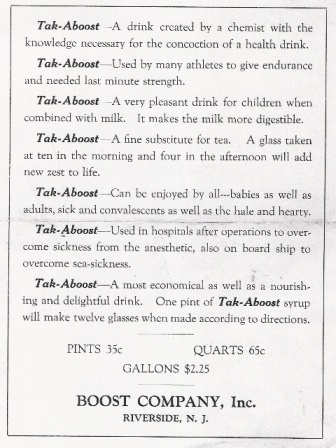
Tak-Aboost advertisement circa 1930s

Boost! was created around 1910 by Benjamin Rice Faunce and was originally known as Tak-Aboost. The drink was registered as a trademark in 1913 and the Boost! Company was formed on May 15, 1915. Tak-Aboost could be dispensed as a type of non-carbonated soda, mixed with seltzer water or served as a milkshake when combined with milk. The drink was initially branded in advertisements as a "health drink" that was capable of giving athletes "endurance and last minute strength"; it as believed to help overcome anesthetic and calm nausea.

During World War II, it was shipped to military personnel. After the death of Faunce in 1949, family members could not agree on the way the company was handled. One faction broke away and established the Drink-Atoast Company, which sold a similar product. Tak-Aboost unsuccessfully sued Drink-Atoast over formulas and became bankrupt in 1957. Drink-Atoast subsequently acquired the trademarks and formulas.

In 1985, the drink's name was changed to Boost! with the company's president, Charles Dugan saying that it was a "more energetic, marketable name". Boost! was granted a temporary restraining order against food and drink company Mead Johnson in the 1990s, claiming it had infringed on their local trademarks. Mead Johnson paid a $350,000 settlement in 1996 and stopped selling their products in South Jersey. In 1997, the name of the company was officially changed from the Drink-Atoast Company to the Boost! Company.

In 2013, Boost! marked its 100th anniversary. The company's president Daniel McDonough purchased a vintage Ford Model A as a symbolic item for the celebration. Dean and Nicole Greco produced a documentary short film about the beverage titled "Bottled Up: The Legend of Boost!" which was shown at film festivals in Atlantic City and Cape May.

== See also ==
- Cuisine of New Jersey
- List of regional beverages of the United States
