= Ernst Barre Private Brewery =

Brewery in Lübbecke, Germany

Privatbrauerei Ernst Barre
- Type: GmbH
- Location: Lübbecke, Germany
- Coordinates: 52°17′42″N 8°37′08″E
- Opened: 1842 by Ernst Johann Barre
- Key people: Christoph Barre
- Annual production volume: 130,000 hectolitres (110,000 US bbl) in 2015
- Other products: Shandy and soft drinks
- Revenue: About €20 million
- Employees: 110
- Website: barre.de

The Ernst Barre Private Brewery (German: Privatbrauerei Ernst Barre GmbH) is a brewery located in Lübbecke, a town in the north-western German district of Minden-Lübbecke, East Westphalia. Founded in 1842 by Ernst Johann Barre, the brewery has remained in the same family for generations.

The Ernst Barre Private Brewery, along with its immediate competitor, the Herforder Brauerei, is one of the largest breweries in East Westphalia based on beer production, signifying its regional importance. In addition to beer, the brewery also produces shandy and soft drinks.

As of 2015, the brewery's annual production was approximately 130,000 hectolitres (110,000 US bbl), generating a revenue of about €20 million, and employing 110 people.

== History and regional importance ==
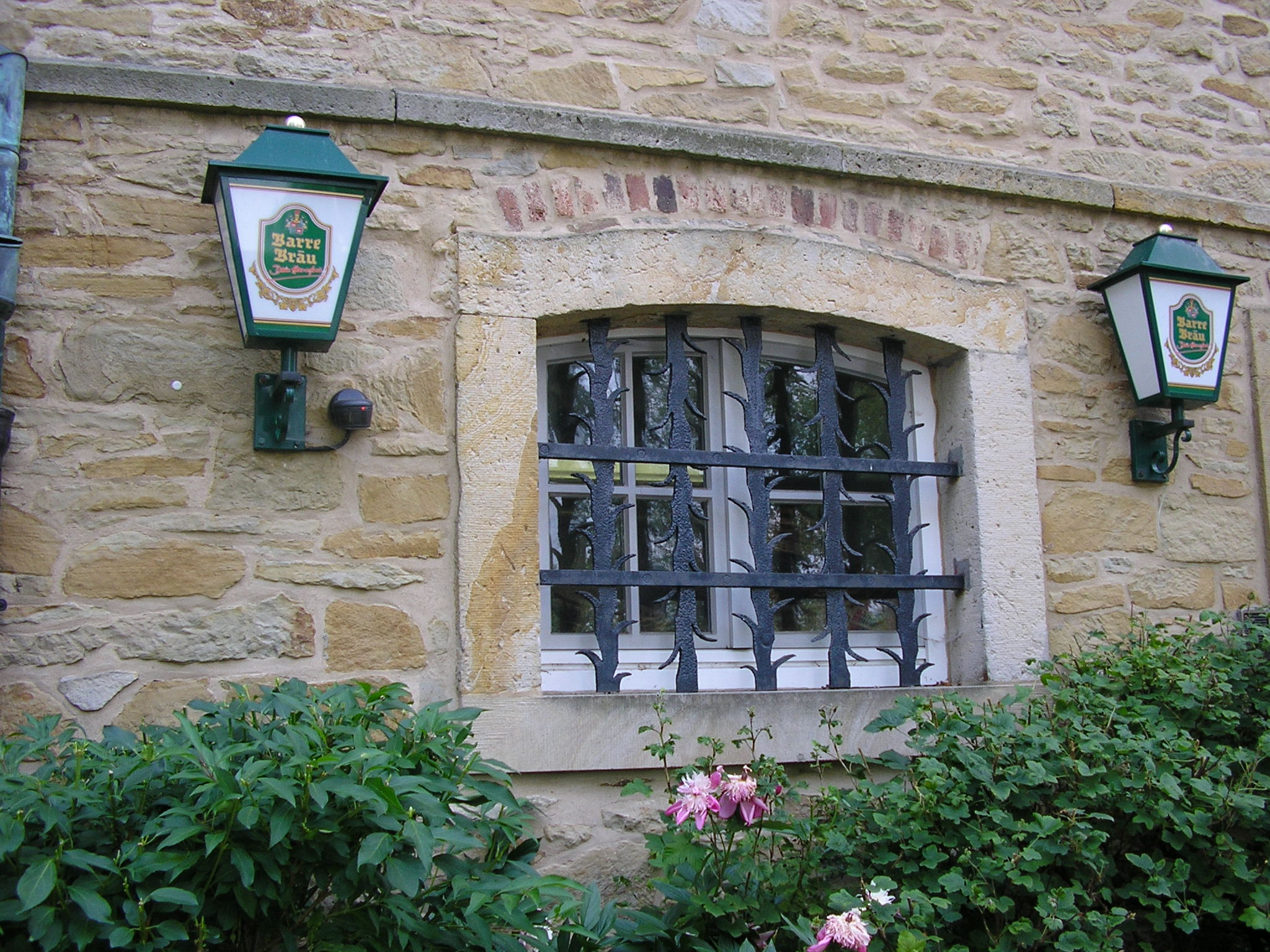
Evidence that Barre Bräu is consumed outside its home county. Here is a restaurant serving Barre beer in Diedrichsburg castle, in the Meller Hills.

The brewery not only supports numerous festivals in the region, but it has even founded a festival of its own, the Bierbrunnenfest (Beer Fountain Festival), which has been celebrated in Lübbecke since 1954. Incredibly, this involves serving thousands of litres of beer to the general populace, at no charge whatsoever. Barre Bräu is not just popular in the Lübbecker Land, but also further north on the North German Plain, and in the district of Herford, to the south of Lübbecke.

Barre Bräu is also exported to Taiwan and China.

Barre Bräu is brewed in accordance with the purity law (Reinheitsgebot) of 1516, and the brewery is a founding member of the Die Freien Brauer (Independent Brewers) initiative, an association of medium-sized private breweries in Germany and Austria. According to its own sources, Barre Bräu produced 150,000 hectolitres (130,000 US bbl) of beer during 2010, which is just over 2% of the annual output of Germany's largest brewery. However, Barre Bräu has a reputation for quality and operates very successfully in its niche market.

== Products ==
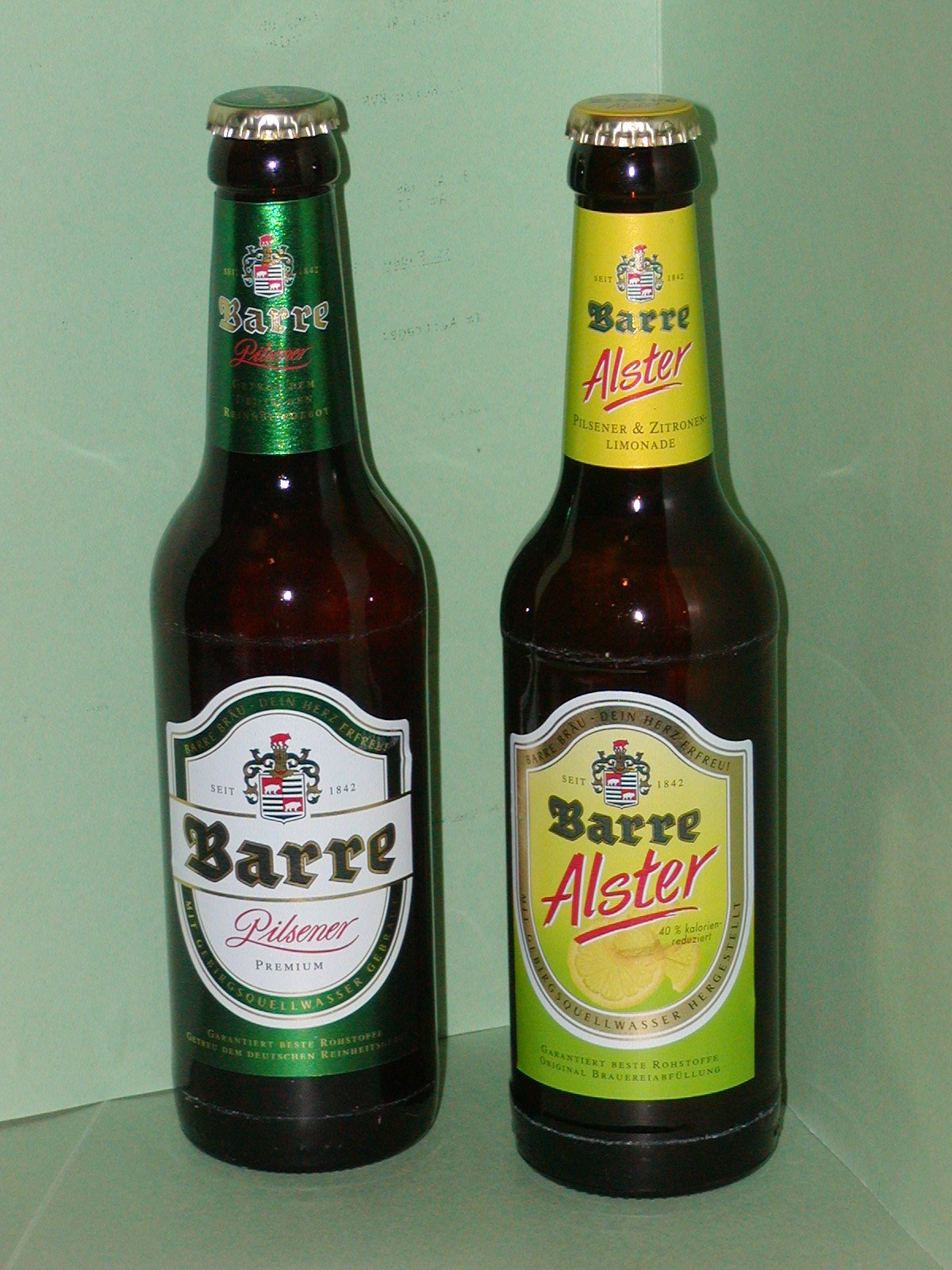
Typical beer bottles

Barre produces numerous types of beer and shandy:

- Barre Pilsener
- Barre Frey Bier (non-alcoholic)
- Barre Dunkel
- Barre Alt
- Barre Weizen
- Barre Maibock
- Barre Alt Schuss (Alt Bier + malt beer)
- Barre Alster (beer shandy)
- Barre Lemon (beer shandy)
- Barre Festbier
- Barre Weizen Grape (beer shandy)
- Barre Fass Brause (non-alcoholic)

Barre Maibock is only available in spring; all other types are sold year-round.

== Features ==
The brewery runs its own museum, Barre's Brauwelt (Barre's Brewing World). The museum opened its doors in 2001, and is the only one of its kind in Ostwestfalen-Lippe. The impressive sandstone-and-brick building housing the museum was among the first to be built when the brewery was established, and it was used as a brewing and storage cellar until the mid-1980s. The exhibit shows a complete production facility, including numerous carefully restored brewing machines and tools used in beer making, and gives a good overview of the brewery's history. Experienced guides provide visitors with interesting information about the art of beer brewing during the 19th and 20th centuries. The brewery's products can subsequently be sampled in the adjacent restaurant.

== Slogans ==
"Barre Bräu dein Herz erfreu!" (loosely translated as "May Barre Bräu please your heart!"); "Mit Gebirgsquellwasser gebraut" (brewed with mountain spring water); "Aus Norddeutschland's ältester Pilsbrauerei" (from northern Germany's oldest Pilsner brewery).
