= Heinrich Reissdorf =

Private brewery in Cologne, Germany

Privat-Brauerei Heinrich Reissdorf
- Interactive map of Privat-Brauerei Heinrich Reissdorf
- Type: GmbH & Co. KG
- Location: Cologne, Germany
- Coordinates: 50°52′34″N 6°59′39″E
- Opened: 1894
- Annual production volume: 635,000 hectolitres (541,000 US bbl) in 2011
- Website: reissdorf.de

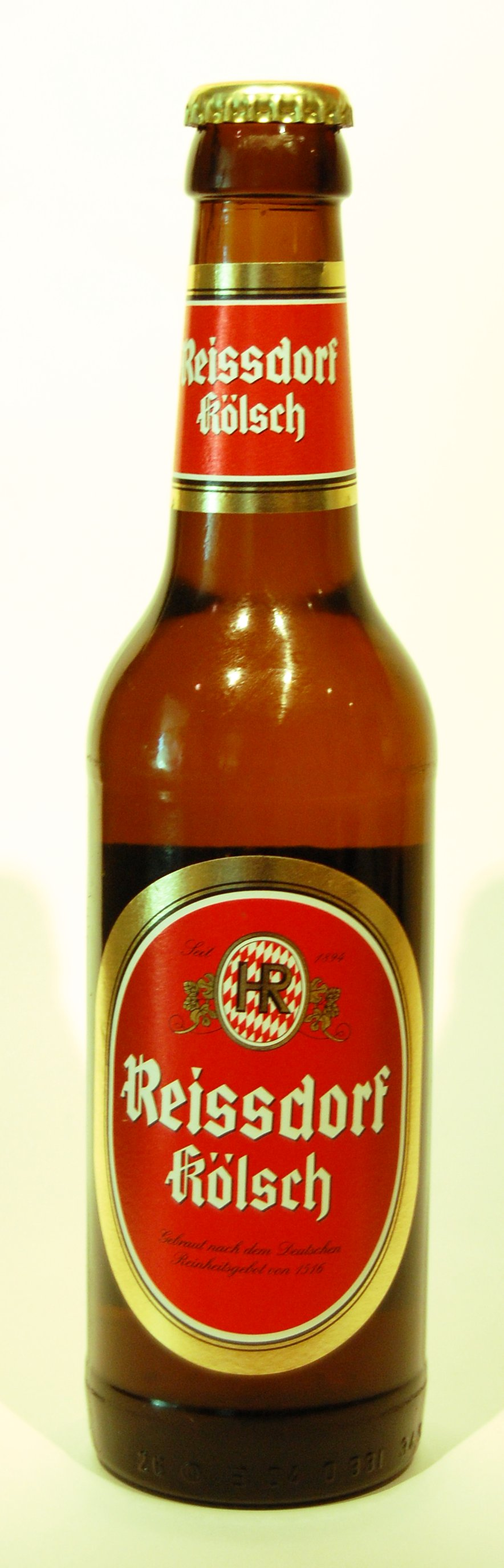
Reissdorf Kölsch bottle

The private brewery Heinrich Reissdorf GmbH & Co. KG was founded in 1894 by Heinrich Reissdorf in Cologne. It produces a top fermented beer called Reissdorf Kölsch.

Since 1968, the brewery in Cologne has been advertising on Aachener Straße with a moving neon sign in which a male lifts a glass of Kölsch to his mouth at a 90-degree angle. As the glass is emptied, the man's body fills with Kölsch, represented by neon lights lighting up from bottom to top. The advertisement alternately depicts a male and a female person. As a landmark of Cologne, this is now a listed building.
