= Kasser Distillers =

American alcoholic beverage company (1943–1989)

Kasser Distillers Products Corp.
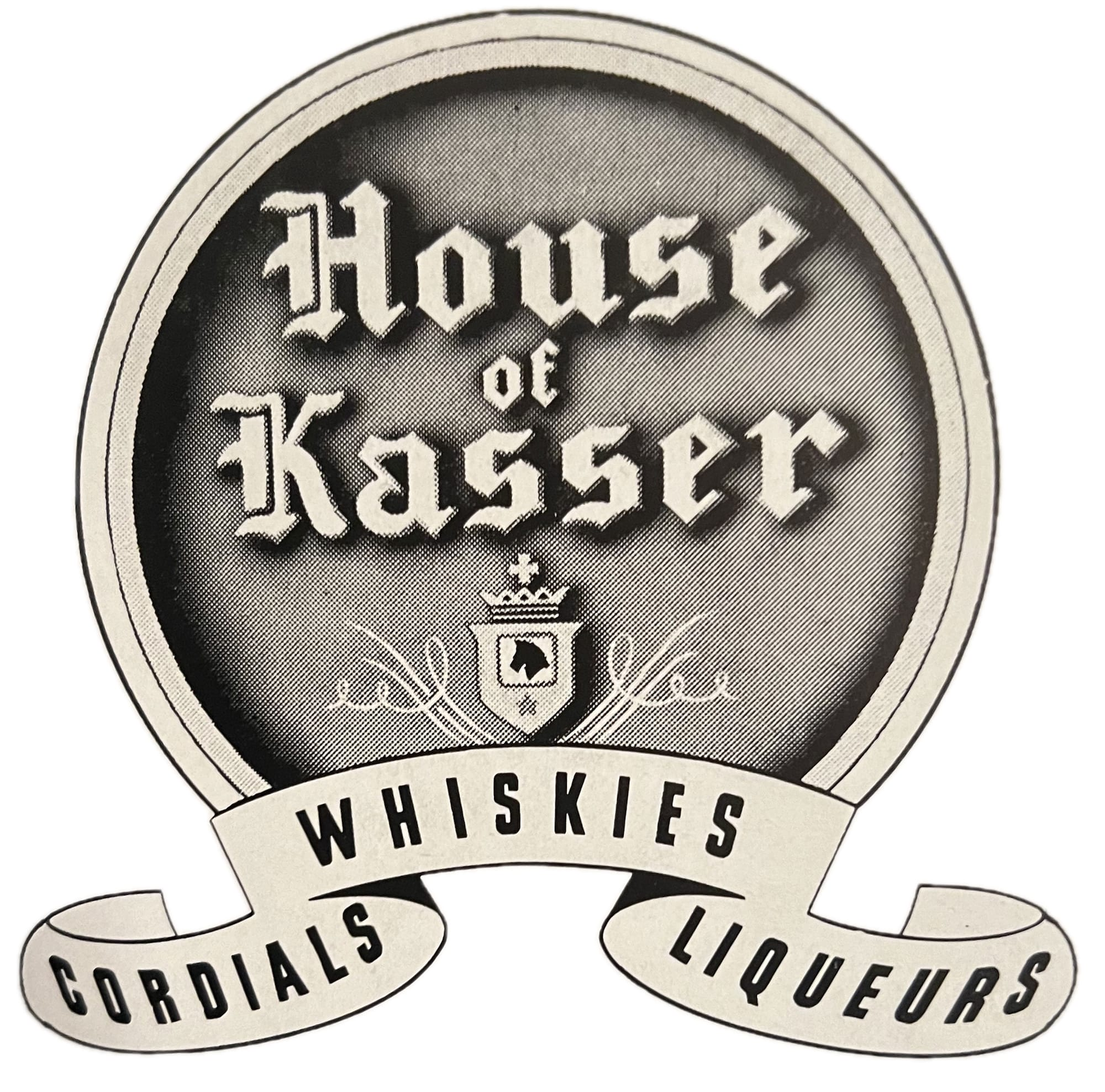
- Type: Private
- Industry: Alcoholic beverage
- Predecessor: Kasko Distillers Corporation
- Founded: 1943
- Founder: Samuel Kasser
- Defunct: 1989
- Headquarters: Philadelphia, Pennsylvania, United States
- Area served: Northeastern United States
- Key people: Samuel Kasser (founder); Raymond H. Kasser (president, 1965–1988); Thomas J. Knox (owner, 1988–1989)
- Products: Wine, spirits, cordials
- Revenue: $60 million (1988)
- Number of employees: 175 (1988)

Kasser Distillers Products Corp. was an American alcoholic beverage company that operated in Philadelphia, Pennsylvania, from 1943 to 1989, blending and bottling wines, spirits, and cordials under a wide range of proprietary labels. It was founded by Samuel Kasser, a Hungarian-born businessman, as the successor to his earlier Kasko Distillers Corporation, which he had operated from 1934 until its sale to Seagram in 1942.

At its peak the company handled more than 200 labels and accounted for over 11 percent of liquor sold through Pennsylvania's state stores, making it one of the largest independent distillers and bottlers in the state. Its best-known products were the jug wine Chateau Luzerne, the Banker's Club line of spirits, and Kasser's 51 whiskey. The company was sold to an investor group led by Thomas J. Knox in June 1988 and closed the following year.

== History ==
=== Predecessor companies: Kasko (1927–1942) ===
Samuel Kasser arrived in the United States from Hungary as a 14-year-old in 1907 and initially worked as a grocer in North Philadelphia. In 1927 he established Kasko Products Co., Inc., a supplier of bakers' and confectioners' goods. After the repeal of Prohibition in 1933 he became president and treasurer of Kasko Brewing Co., and in 1934 he founded Kasko Distillers Corporation.

Kasko Distillers grew quickly, and its Four Kings Whiskey became the largest-selling rye whiskey in Pennsylvania. Between 1934 and 1943 Kasko shipped more than 1.5 million cases, at one point accounting for seven percent of all alcoholic products sold through state stores.

In 1942, Seagram purchased Kasko Distillers Corporation and its inventory for the company's brand names and market position, leaving Kasser without rights to the Kasko name.

=== Founding and growth under Samuel Kasser (1943–1965) ===
In 1943, Samuel Kasser founded a new enterprise, Kasser Distillers Products Corporation, together with Kings' Wine Company. In 1949 the company moved to what became its permanent location at Third and Luzerne Streets in the Feltonville section of Philadelphia, where it built a blending and bottling plant.

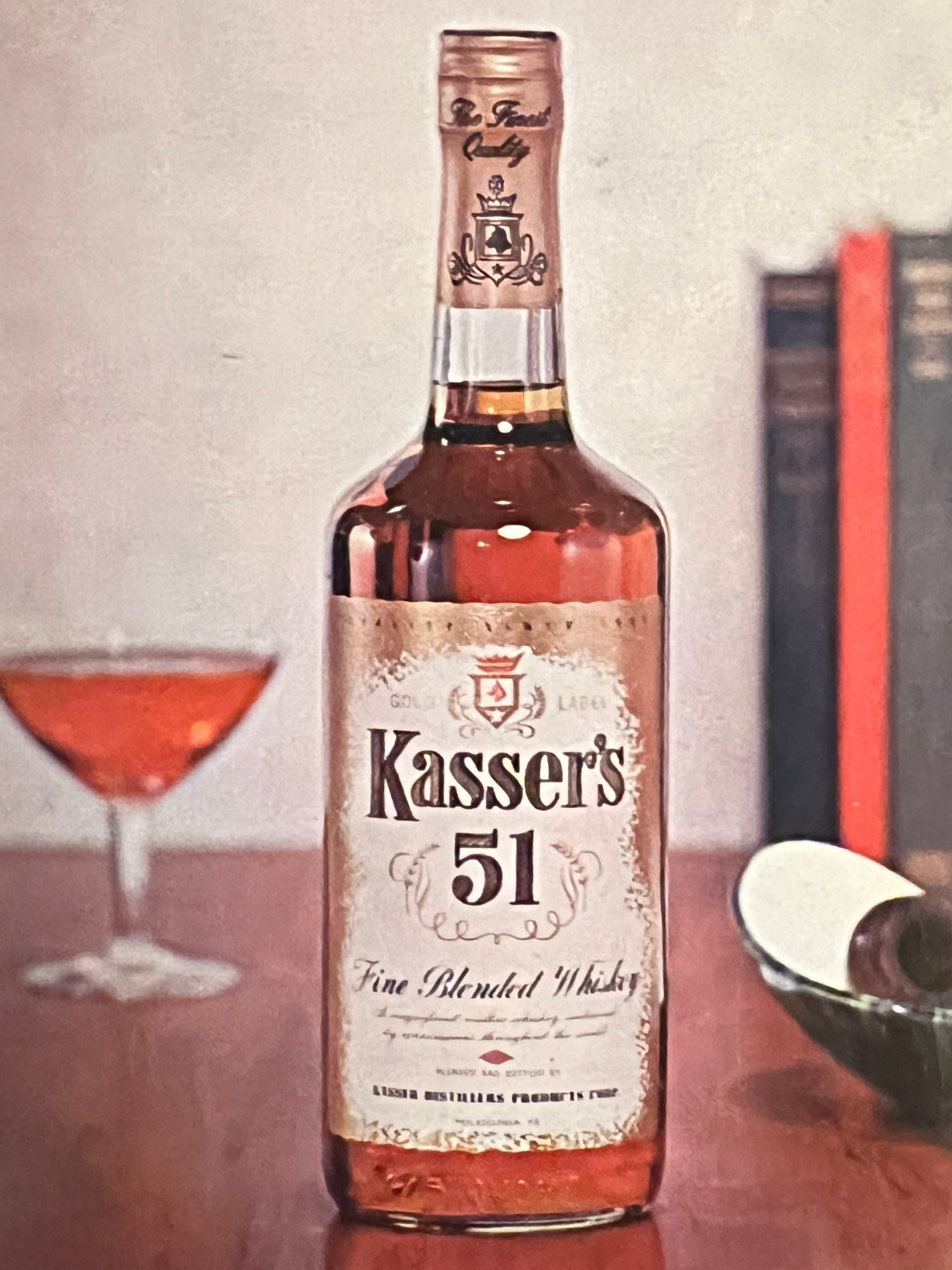
Kasser's 51 whiskey bottle, one of the company's flagship products

Under Samuel Kasser the company introduced the full quart whiskey bottle in Pennsylvania in 1950, developed a no-drip pourer, and was an early user of television advertising to promote wine.

The company expanded during the 1960s, adding 100,000 square feet to the Philadelphia plant in 1964 to bring its total area to 250,000 square feet. It installed equipment capable of bottling 10,000 cases per day and built bonded warehouses with capacity for 20,000 barrels of aging domestic whiskey, along with customs bonded warehouses for imported spirits.

=== Raymond Kasser era (1965–1988) ===
Following Samuel Kasser's death in 1965, his son Raymond H. Kasser became president. Raymond had already been named "Man of the Year" by the National Association of Wine Producers and Bottlers in 1962, three years before taking over the company. As president he expanded the product line and introduced Chateau Luzerne, which became the company's best-known brand.

In 1979, Raymond Kasser publicly opposed proposals to privatize Pennsylvania's liquor system, arguing that the state monopoly returned more revenue to the state and avoided concentrating liquor outlets in disadvantaged neighborhoods.

By 1988 the firm's distribution network extended beyond Pennsylvania into Ohio, New Jersey, Maryland, Delaware, the District of Columbia, and several cities in Florida and Louisiana. The company operated under 29 trading styles and used multiple trademarks for the same type of beverage.

=== Sale and closure (1988–1989) ===
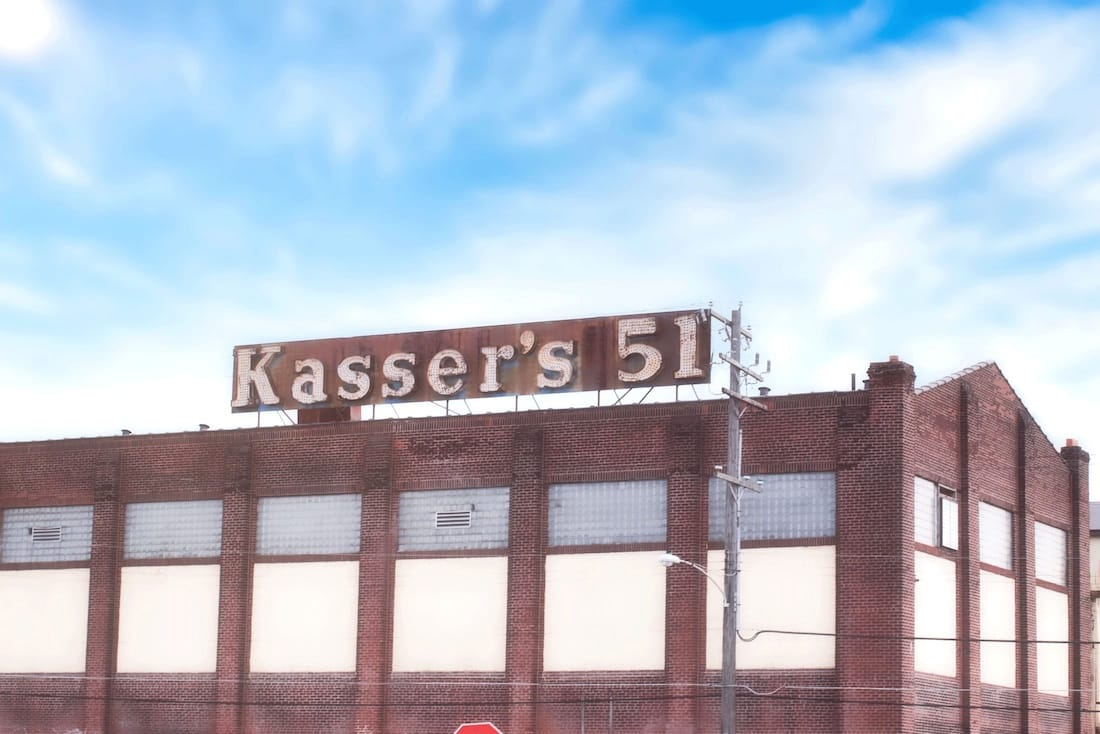
Former Kasser Distillers facility at Third and Luzerne Streets in Philadelphia

In June 1988, after 45 years of family ownership, Raymond Kasser sold the company to an investor group led by Thomas J. Knox, a Chestnut Hill businessman, for $25 million. At the time of the sale, Kasser Distillers had annual sales exceeding $60 million and 240 product labels, ranked among Pennsylvania's five largest liquor suppliers behind Gallo, Seagram, and Jim Beam, and accounted for roughly 5 percent of liquor sold in the state. Knox said he would maintain operations and the plant's 175 jobs, and stated an intention to add sales staff.

Within a year the company was losing at least $100,000 per month. Knox began selling off the brand names and closed the bottling plant in September 1989, fifteen months after the acquisition and 46 years after the company's founding; the closure laid off 38 production workers along with support staff. The wine brands, including Chateau Luzerne and Tiger Rose, were sold to the Canandaigua Wine Company of New York for more than $1 million, and the spirits brands were sold separately to buyers including Laird & Company. None of the company's operations survived the sale intact.

== Products and brands ==
Kasser Distillers produced "popularly priced" beverages rather than premium brands. Despite its name, the company operated principally as a blender and bottler, purchasing bulk wine and spirits that it blended and packaged under its own labels. Its wines were sourced largely from California, shipped east in tankers, and bottled at the Philadelphia plant. At its peak the company handled over 200 labels and accounted for more than 11 percent of all liquor sold in Pennsylvania.

=== Banker's Club ===
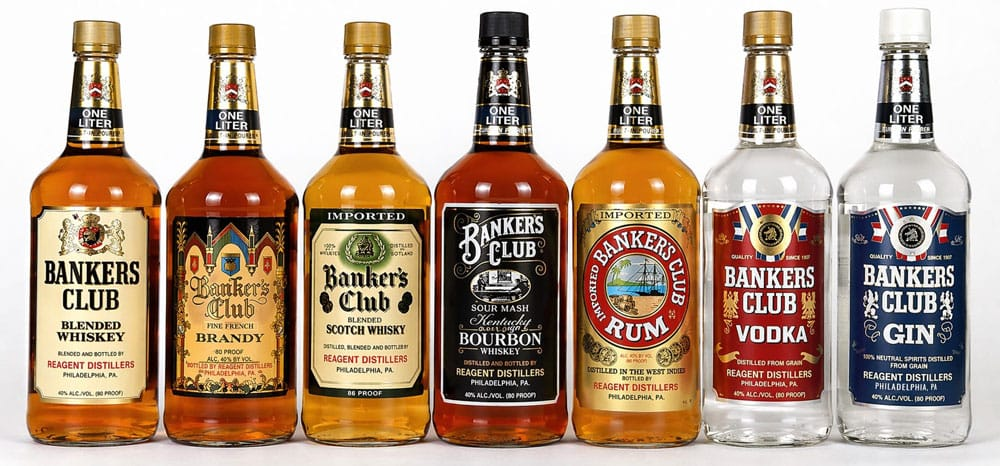
The Banker's Club product line, one of Kasser's major spirits brands

Kasser introduced Banker's Club as a whiskey brand in 1967. By 1969 the line had expanded to include gin and vodka. The brand was bottled under the name Regency Distillers. It remains available in Pennsylvania and is now produced by Kasser Laird of New Jersey.

=== Chateau Luzerne ===
Chateau Luzerne was the company's flagship wine, named after the intersection of Third and Luzerne Streets where the plant stood. Usually sold in large glass jugs and marketed as an everyday table wine, it became the best-selling table wine in Pennsylvania by the early 1980s.

Its sales were helped by an award-winning television campaign in which a wealthy man serves Chateau Luzerne at lavish parties and, asked about the inexpensive wine, replies, "How do you think I got so rich?"

=== Kasser's 51 ===
Kasser's 51 was the company's flagship whiskey, introduced shortly after the founding of Kasser Distillers in 1943, and later extended to a gin under the same name. It was packaged in quart bottles, a format the company helped popularize in Pennsylvania during the 1950s. The brand remained in distribution across the northeastern United States and continues to be sold under the Kasser Laird label.

=== Other brands ===
Kasser Distillers marketed a range of other spirits, wines, and cordials, including:

- Kasser's Vodka – launched in the 1950s.
- Four Queens – a blended whiskey still sold today, chiefly in Pennsylvania, and associated with boilo traditions in the state's anthracite coal region.
- Tiger Rose – a semi-sweet wine.
- House of Kasser – a line of cordials and liqueurs.
- Monogram, Barrister's, General Lee, and Zapata – whiskey and tequila brands.
- Dunhill – a Scotch whisky discontinued after a trademark suit by Alfred Dunhill of London.
- King Solomon, Kings Wine, and White Tip – inexpensive jug wines.

The surviving trademarks, including Kasser's 51, Banker's Club, and Four Queens, are owned and distributed by Kasser Laird, a division of Laird & Company.

== Litigation and controversies ==
=== Alfred Dunhill trademark litigation ===
In 1963, Kasser Distillers adopted the mark "Dunhill" for a Scotch whisky, prompting a 1968 trademark infringement suit by Alfred Dunhill of London, which argued that the name would confuse consumers familiar with its luxury tobacco goods. In a 1972 decision, Judge Edward R. Becker of the United States District Court for the Eastern District of Pennsylvania ruled for Dunhill, finding that Kasser had deliberately chosen the name for its associations with stability, quality, and "British flavor." The ruling is cited in trademark law for its treatment of marks used across unrelated product categories.

=== Severance dispute ===
The 1989 closure was followed by a dispute over severance pay. Knox had promised "substantial" severance to laid-off workers, but negotiations broke down and workers ultimately received about 14 cents on the dollar of the promised amount by 1994.

== Legacy ==
Kasser Distillers remained under family control for its entire history as an independent company, from its founding in 1943 until the 1988 sale, and was one of the largest suppliers to the Pennsylvania Liquor Control Board throughout that period. Its low-priced wines and spirits were widely distributed across Pennsylvania and the broader Northeastern United States. The company ceased operations within fifteen months of passing out of family ownership.

The Four Queens whiskey brand, created by Kasser, is still produced by Laird & Company and remains a standard ingredient in boilo, a Christmas drink traditional in Pennsylvania's anthracite coal region. The brand sells roughly 36,000 bottles a year, 98 percent of them in Pennsylvania.

The former plant at Third and Luzerne Streets was later converted to industrial use, and a large "Kasser's 51" sign remained visible on the building for years after the closure.

== See also ==
- Pennsylvania Liquor Control Board
- Boilo
- Laird & Company
