= Apple Beer =

American non-alcoholic fruit beer

- Type: Soft drink
- Manufacturer: The Apple Beer Corporation
- Origin: United States
- Introduced: 1964
- Alcohol by volume: None
- Colour: Golden
- Flavour: Apple
- Ingredients: Purified carbonated water, pure cane sugar, citric acid, natural flavors, vitamin C
- Website: www.applebeer.com

Apple Beer is a non-alcoholic American brand of the German drink Fassbrause, produced by The Apple Beer Corporation in Salt Lake City. Apple Beer is primarily distributed to the Western and Mountain regions of the United States and in the Caribbean.

== History ==
Apple Beer was first produced in the 1960s from the fassbrause formula of Scholvien & Co. (now WILD Flavors). Although originally only available in cans, Apple Beer is now also available in glass bottles and in soda fountains.

== Ingredients ==
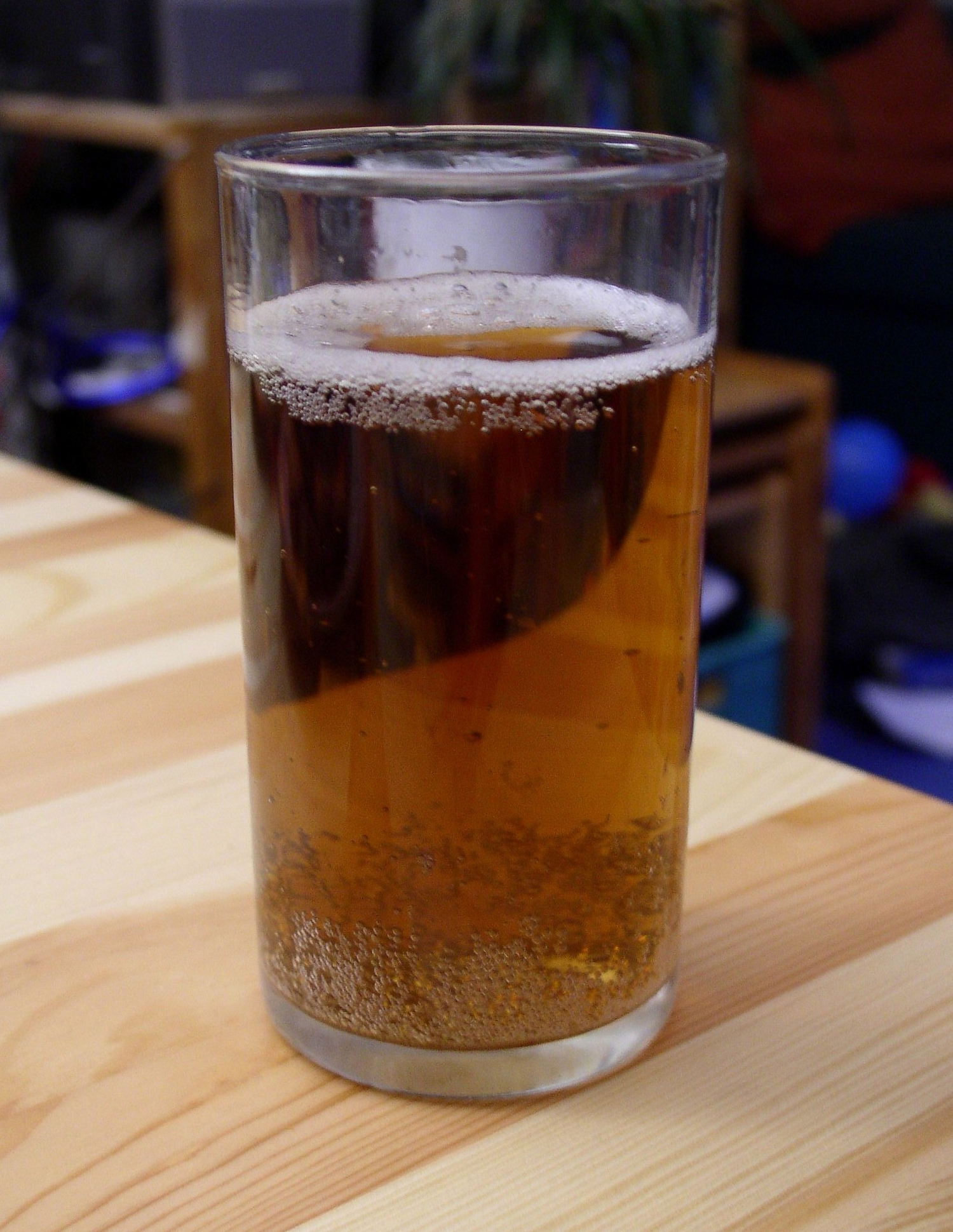
A glass of Apple Beer

Apple Beer is made of carbonated water, sugar, citric acid, natural flavors, and vitamin C.

== See also ==
- Cider
- List of brand name soft drinks products
- List of soft drink flavors
