= Horsefeather (cocktail) =

Whiskey cocktail from Kansas

- Type: Cocktail
- Ingredients: 1.5 US fluid ounces (44 ml) rye whiskey or blended whiskey; 4.0 US fluid ounces (120 ml) ginger beer; 3 dashes Angostura bitters; squirt of lemon juice
- Base spirit: Whiskey
- Standard drinkware: Highball glass
- Served: On the rocks; poured over ice
- Preparation: Fill a highball glass 3/4 with ice. Pour in ingredients and stir.

A horsefeather is a whiskey cocktail. It was popularized in Lawrence, Kansas, in the 1990s. It remains a regional drink in the Kansas City region. The drink is an iteration of the classic horse's neck cocktail and is similar to a Moscow mule.

A horsefeather is traditionally rye whiskey or blended whiskey, ginger beer, three dashes of Angostura bitters, and a little lemon juice. A highball glass is filled 3/4 with ice. The ingredients are then poured into the glass and stirred. There are many variations such as substituting ginger beer with ginger ale, adding cherries, muddling the lemon, replacing the lemon with lime, or creating a frozen version.

== See also ==
- List of cocktails
- List of regional beverages of the United States
