= Gaffel Becker & Co =

Brewery in Cologne, Germany

Privatbrauerei Gaffel Becker & Co. OHG
- Interactive map of Privatbrauerei Gaffel Becker & Co. OHG
- Location: Cologne, Germany
- Coordinates: 50°56′47″N 6°57′23″E
- Opened: May 24, 1908
- Annual production volume: 480,000 hectolitres (410,000 US bbl)
- Employees: 140 (2009)

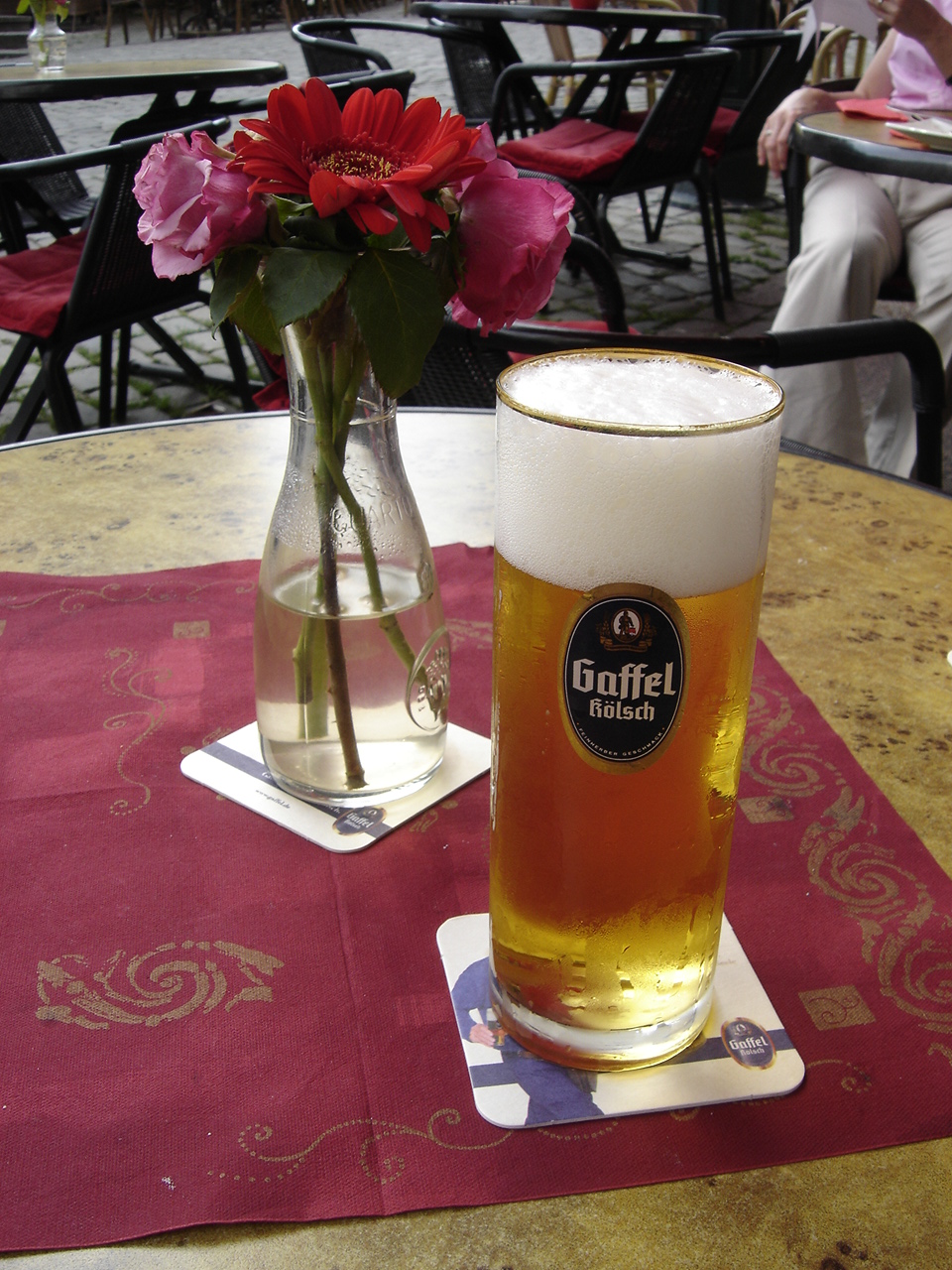
A Stange of Kolsch in Aachen, Germany

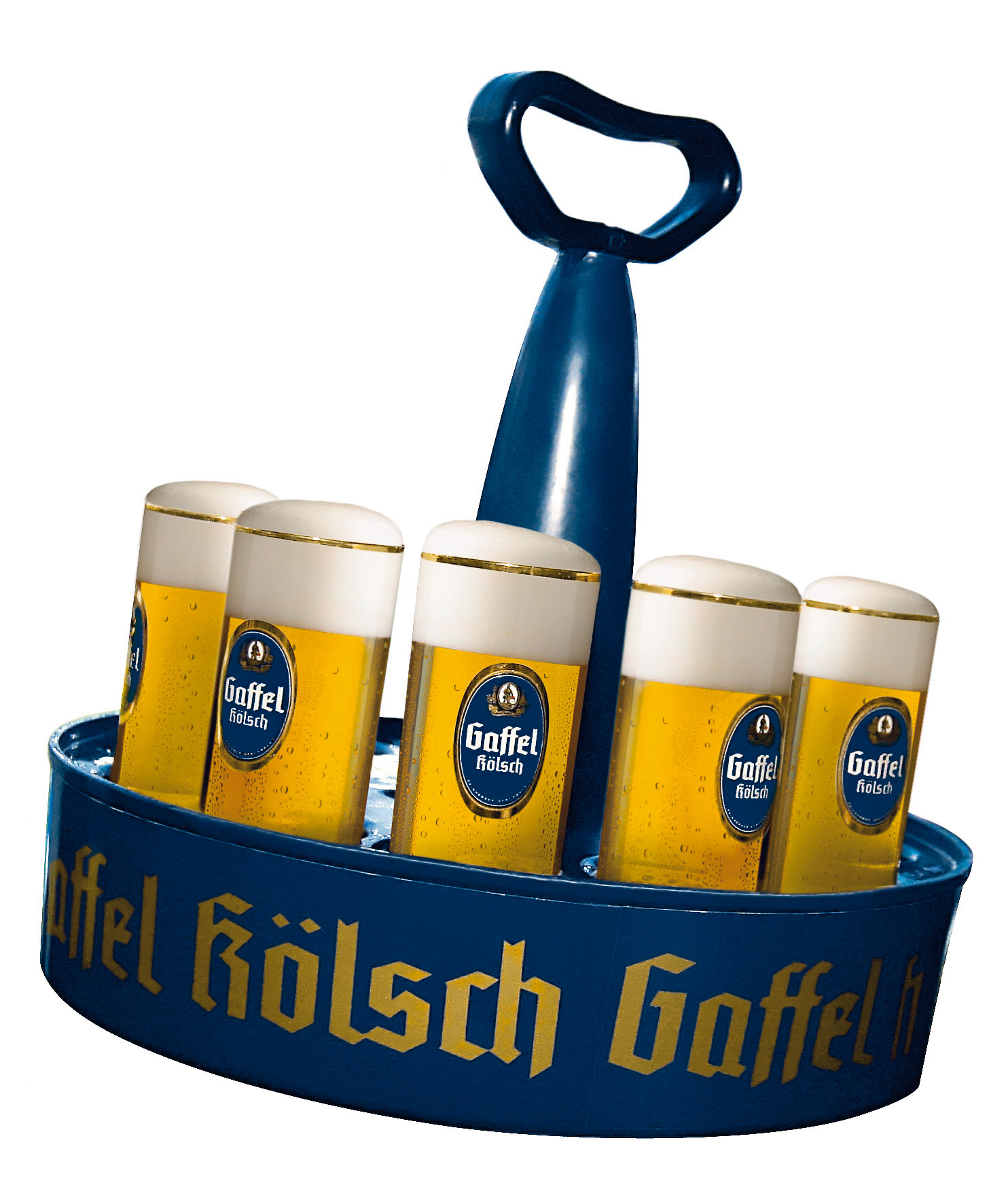
Gaffel Kölsch wreath

Gaffel Becker & Co is a brewery founded in 1908 by the Becker Brothers in Cologne. It produces a traditional regional style top-fermented beer called Gaffel Kölsch.

== History ==
The name Gaffel Kölsch derives from the Cologne Gaffeln, which in 1396 were the political arm of the guilds and merchants in Cologne. "Gaffel" was the old Cologne dialect word for a two-pronged fork, which Cologne merchants had brought back from Venice in the 11th century. With the Charter of September 14, 1396, the first democratic constitution of the city of Cologne, the 22 Gaffeln assumed control of the city council and even appointed the mayor, aldermen, and judges. Their regular evening meetings were rounded off with food and drink, which they enjoyed in the oldest building on Alter Markt, the Gaffel House. The building was first documented in 1213 and has existed in its current form since 1580.

The Zum Leysten brewery and inn, first mentioned in 1302, is officially listed as "braxatoria supra Monticulum," meaning "the brewery above the little hill," on the site of which the Gaffel brewery stood at Eigelstein 41–43 until 2020. Under the name "Zum Brüsseler Hof," the brewery was reopened by Gottfried Joseph Schumacher in 1822. Schumacher ran the brewery until 1857. After his death, his siblings managed the brewery until they sold it to Reinhard Joseph Appel in 1859. His widow continued to run the Brüsseler Hof until 1874. From then until 1888, the building served solely as an inn. The brewer Adam Lenzen temporarily operated a house brewery there. Afterwards, it operated as an inn and beer trading company under the name Glückauf Brauerei AG. On May 24, 1908, the Becker brothers took over the brewery, renovated the inn, and changed its name to "In der Gaffel" after the "Kölner Gaffeln" (Cologne breweries). The building underwent further renovations in 1918 when the interior was redesigned with historical motifs of the city of Cologne.
