= Manhattan Special =

Brooklyn based beverage company

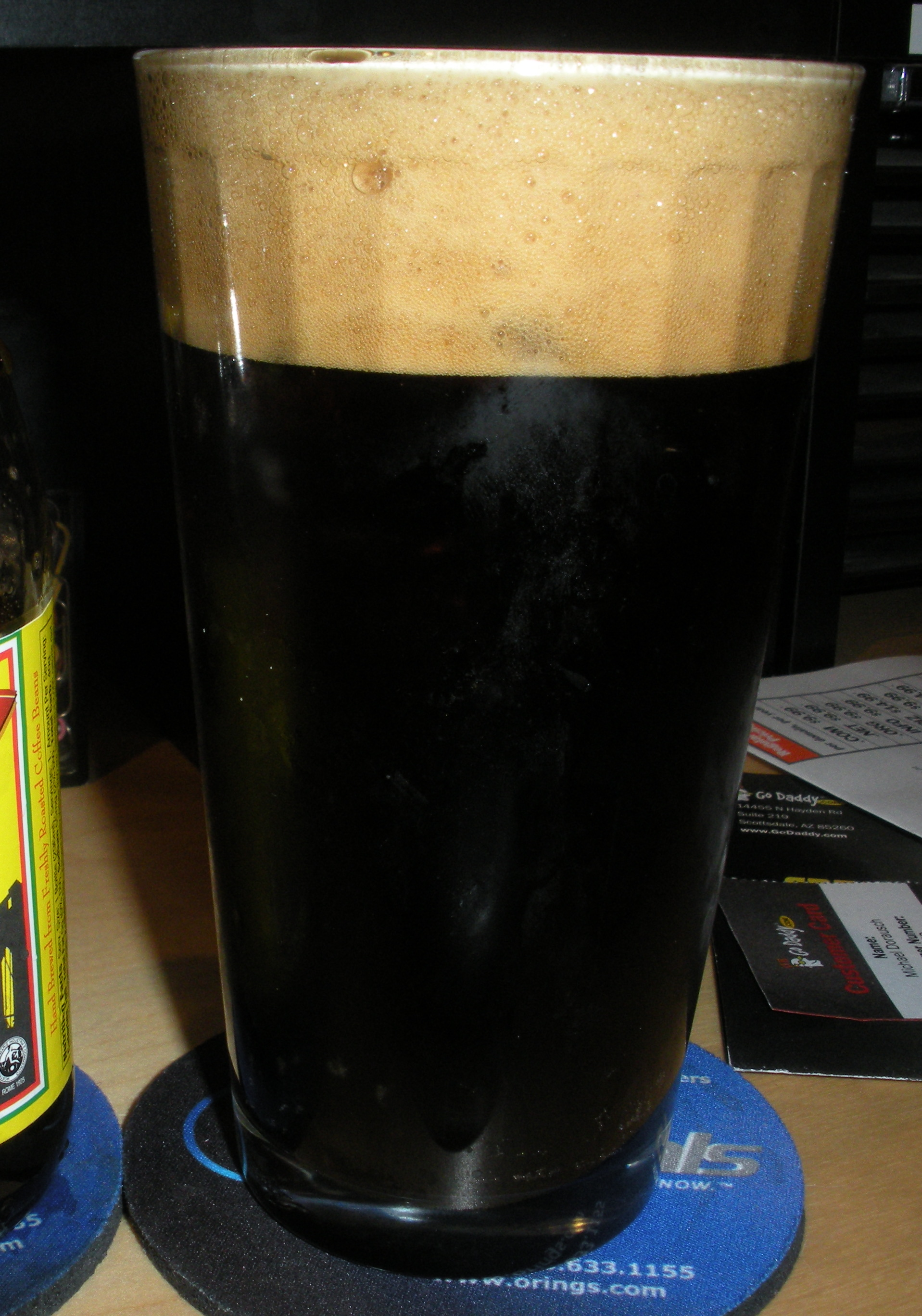
- A glass of Manhattan Special Espresso Coffee Soda
- Company type: Private
- Industry: Beverages
- Founded: 1895 in Brooklyn, New York
- Headquarters: Brooklyn, New York, U.S.
- Key people: Aurora and Louis Passaro
- Products: Soft drinks, iced coffee drinks
- Website: manhattanspecial.com

Manhattan Special is a beverage company located in Brooklyn, New York. The company was founded in 1895 and is located in the neighborhood of Williamsburg. Their most famous product is their Espresso Coffee Soda, made with espresso beans, seltzer water, and sugar. The name of the company originated from the location of its plant on Manhattan Avenue.

Although best known for their coffee beverages, Manhattan Special also produces a line of more traditional sodas. It uses all natural flavors. Flavors include vanilla cream soda, cherry, sarsaparilla, orange, and gassosa (lemon/lime).

Manhattan Special is mentioned in the film Sing Sing as a beverage one of the prisoners loved to drink with his wife before his incarceration.
