= Boilo =

Spiced honey and water drink from Pennsylvania

- Type: Mixed drink
- Ingredients: Varies by recipe
- Standard drinkware: Mug or Mason Jar
- Standard garnish: Never
- Served: Straight up: chilled, without ice

Boilo is a traditional Christmas or Yuletide drink in the Coal Region of northeastern and east central Pennsylvania.

Boilo is a variation of a traditional Lithuanian liqueur called krupnik or krupnikas.

Characteristically boilo has a standard recipe including citrus fruits (such as oranges and lemons), herbs and spices (such as nutmeg, cloves, caraway seed, and anise seed), and other ingredients such as honey and ginger ale. The traditional base ingredient in boilo is moonshine. Many modern recipes have replaced home-brewed moonshine with blended whiskey, rye or grain alcohol, and may be made on a stove top or in a slow cooker. Some recipes specify Four Queens, a blended whiskey originally bottled in Philadelphia by Kasser Distillers and later sold to Laird & Company in New Jersey. Variations on the traditional recipe include honeyberry boilo, "tomata" boilo, blueberry boilo, and apple pie boilo. Some traditions recommend that holiday music and decorating accompany the cooking process, to add to the festive effect of the beverage.

== Commercial Products ==
- Since 2015, Coal Country Boilo, a female owned and operated small business, has provided a traditional Boilo raw spice blend along with a variety of handed down recipes that honor and preserve the historic traditions of the anthracite coal region. They have been showcased on many local news outlets, published in a variety of newspapers and work side by side with Pennsylvania historical organizations such as the Schuylkill County Historical Society and the National Canal Museum in efforts to educate and preserve the history of the coal region. Coal Country Boilo products provide an authentic boilo experience and can be found at www.coalcountryboilo.com
- In 2016 Jabberwocky Candles of Frackville, PA released a Boilo Scented Candle.
- As of December 2012 Brokey’s LLC of Ringtown Pennsylvania introduced an "instant" version of the drink that is available commercially.
- Spring Gate Vineyard and Brewery introduced a commercial version in 2020 that was based on the owner's coal region family recipe.
