= Almdudler =

Austrian brand of carbonated soft drinks

Logo

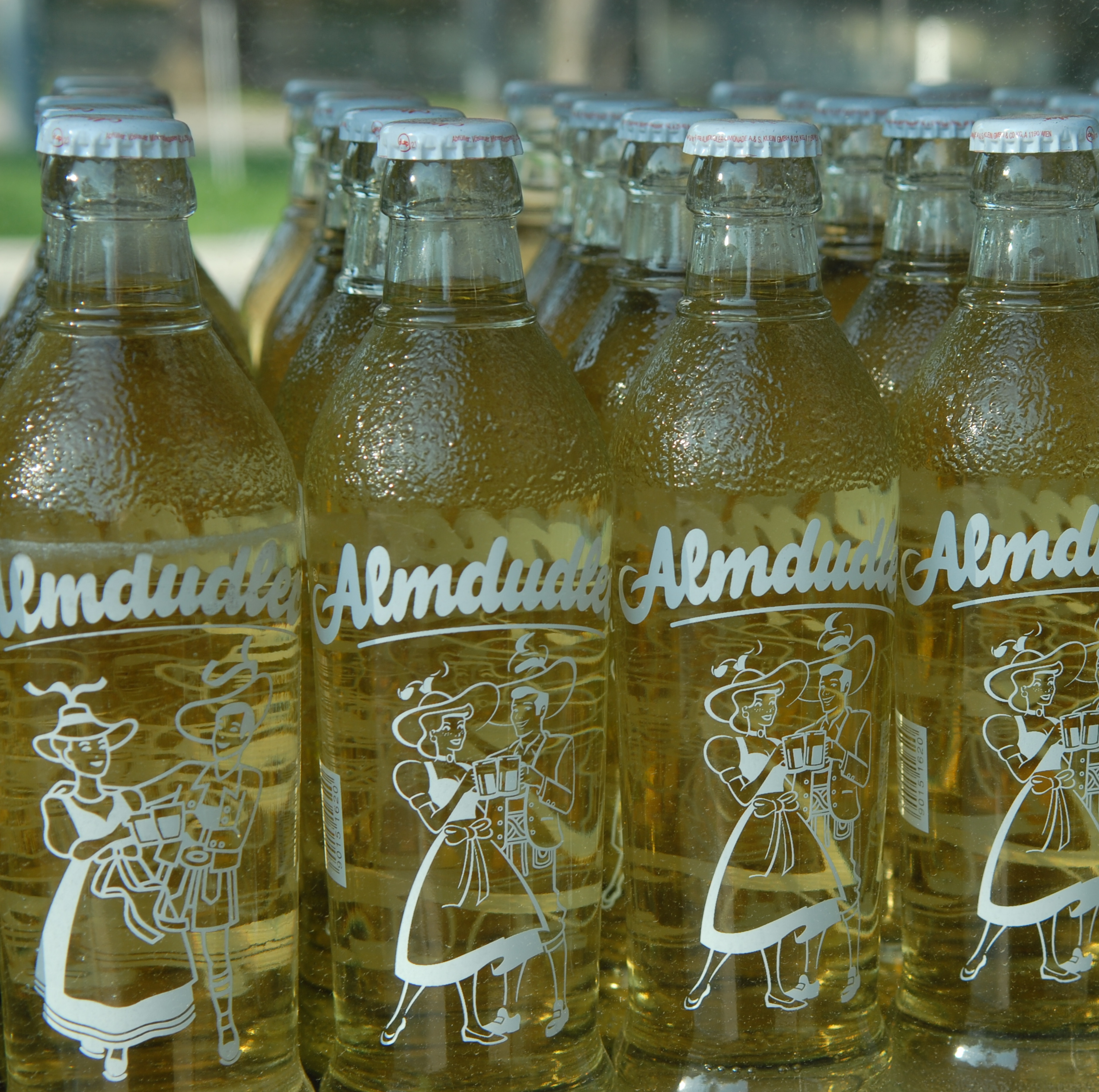
Bottles of Almdudler

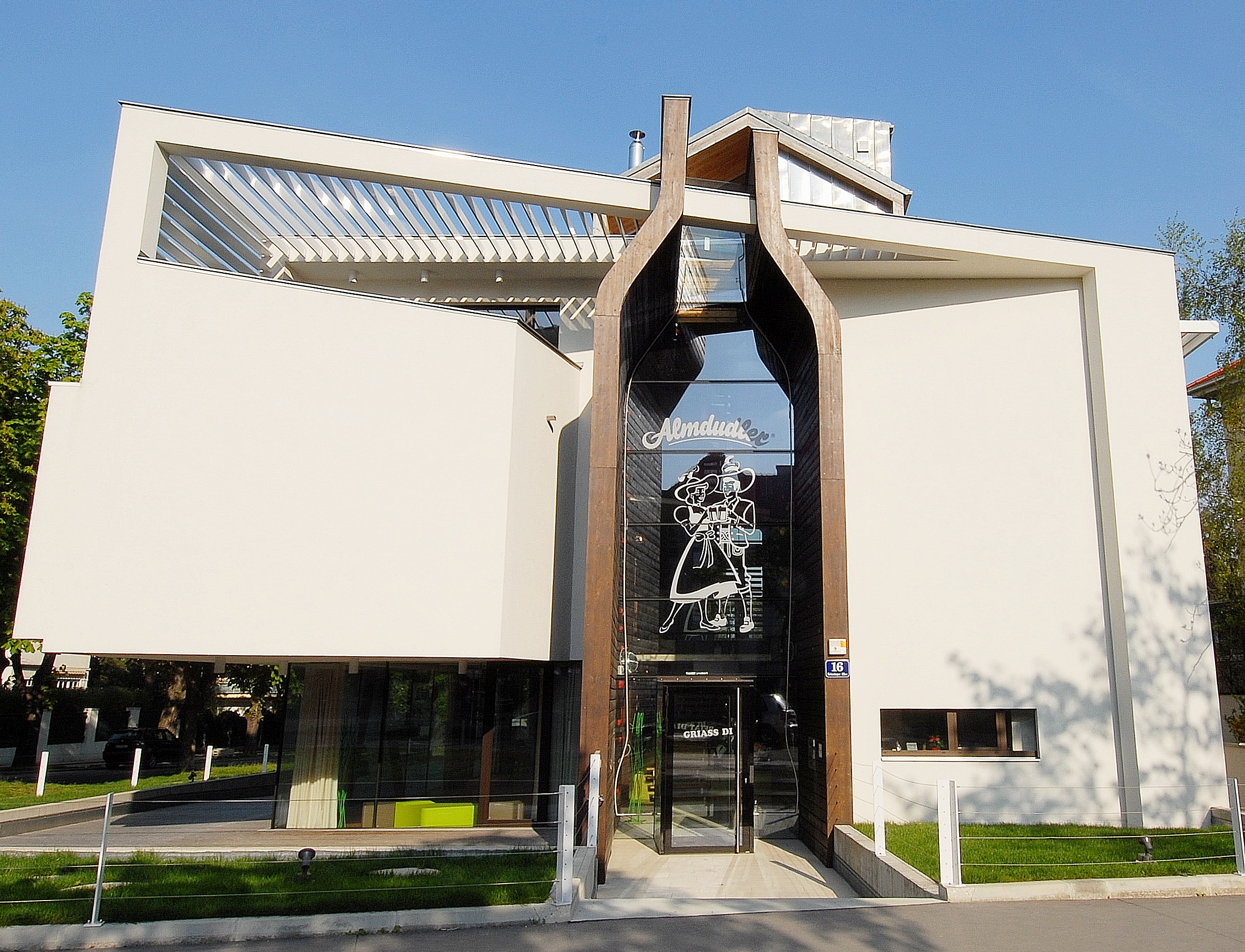
Almdudler house, Vienna

Almdudler (German pronunciation: [ˈalmˌduːdlɐ]) is the brand name of a popular herbal carbonated soft drink from Austria.

== Product ==
The original Almdudler is a sweetened carbonated beverage made of herbal extracts. Almdudler has been called the "national drink of Austria". Its popularity in Austria is second only to Coca-Cola. About 80 million litres of the beverage are produced per year.

Almdudler is currently sold in original, light (sugar-free), "still" (uncarbonated), and g'spritzt (mixed with carbonated mineral water) versions. In Austria, a Radler variety (mixed with beer), is available as Almradler. In the wine-growing regions of Lower Austria and Burgenland, it is a popular mixer with locally produced red and white wines.

== History ==
After three years of development, Almdudler was produced from 1957 by the Viennese entrepreneur Erwin Klein (1924–1983). According to the company's website, he derived the name from the then-common phrase auf der Alm dudeln, which means "yodeling in the (alpine) pasture". The drink was originally created and marketed as an alternative to alcoholic beverages or as a mixer for alcoholic drinks.

Klein promoted the popularity of Almdudler through advertising and sponsoring at major sporting events, such as the 1964 Winter Olympics held in Innsbruck. Since 1973, the Almdudler company only functions as a license supplier.

The Austrian family business Pfanner and the mineral water company Franken Brunnen have been distribution partners in Germany since 2016, and Stardrinks AG (a subsidiary of Heineken Switzerland AG) in Switzerland. For the 60th anniversary of the brand in 2017, the American artist Mel Ramos created a painting with the name "Almdudler’s Fabulous Blonde".

Almdudler remains wholly owned by the Klein family. Erwin Klein’s son Thomas serves as chairman of the parent company supervisory board, while Gerhard Schilling has been managing director since 2004.

== Marketing and distribution ==
Almdudler is currently bottled in Austria, Germany, Croatia, Belgium, and Switzerland. It is further exported to the Czech Republic, Slovakia, Hungary, the Netherlands, Romania, Australia, and the United States.

In 2017, American figurative painter Mel Ramos created a painting for the brand's 60th anniversary entitled "Almdudler's Fabulous Blonde", which was exhibited in the Vienna Museum of Art History. The famous award winning advertising slogan for Almdudler "Wenn die kan Almdudler hab'n, geh i wieder ham." "If they don't have any Almdudler I'm going home".

== Popularity ==
Nearly 99 percent of all Austrians know the herbal soft drink. Almdudler was ranked 7th in Austria's largest brand study. The so-called Brand Asset Valuator by the Young & Rubicam agency measures brand value from the consumer's point of view, and the 2000 respondents chose Almdudler as the only Austrian beverage brand among the top 10. Over 80 million liters of Almdudler are produced every year; 14 percent (as of 2010) and 20 percent (as of 2014) of total sales are bottled and sold in foreign markets.
