= Kölsch (beer) =

Local beer specialty that is brewed in Cologne, Germany

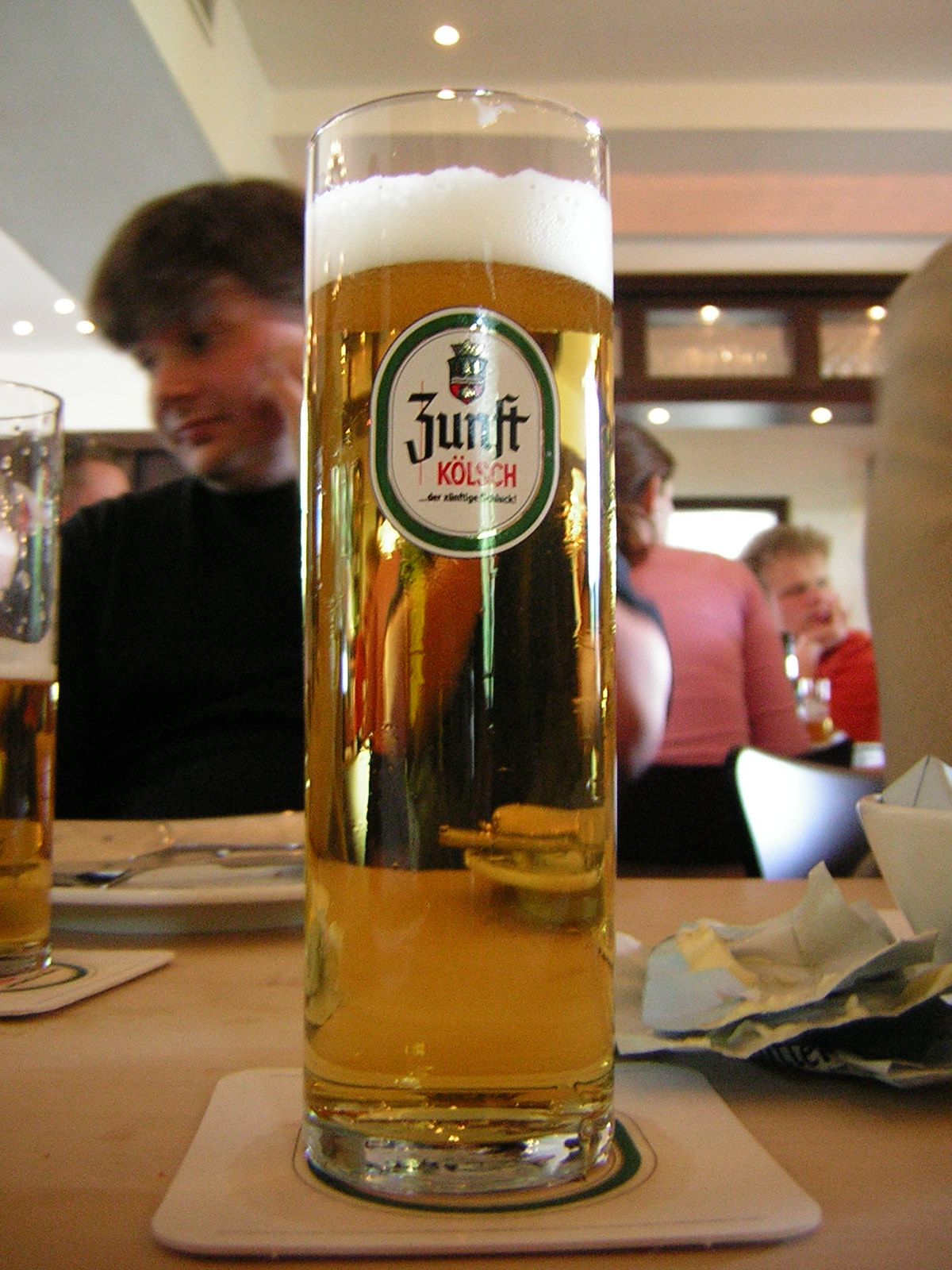
- Kölsch served in the traditional 200-millilitre (6.8 US fl oz) Stange glass
- Country of origin: Cologne, Germany
- Yeast type: Top-fermenting
- Alcohol by volume: 4.4–5.2%
- Bitterness (IBU): 20–30
- Original gravity: 1.044–1.050
- Final gravity: 1.007–1.011
- Malt percentage: Usually 100%

Kölsch (German pronunciation: [kœlʃ]) is a style of beer originating in Cologne (Köln), Germany. In appearance, it is bright and clear with a pale gold hue. Kölsch is a top-fermenting beer.

Since 1997, the term Kölsch has had a protected geographical indication (PGI) within the European Union, indicating a beer that is made within 50 km (31 mi) of the city of Cologne and brewed according to the Kölsch-Konvention as defined by the members of the Cologne Brewery Association (Kölner Brauerei-Verband). Kölsch is one of the most strictly defined beer styles in Germany: according to the convention, it is a pale, highly attenuated, hoppy, bright (i.e. filtered and not cloudy) top-fermenting beer, and must be brewed according to the Reinheitsgebot. It has an original gravity between 11 and 14 degrees Plato (specific gravity of 1.044 to 1.056).

Kölsch is warm fermented with top-fermenting yeast, then conditioned at cold temperatures like a lager. This brewing process is similar to that used for Düsseldorf's altbier.

== History ==
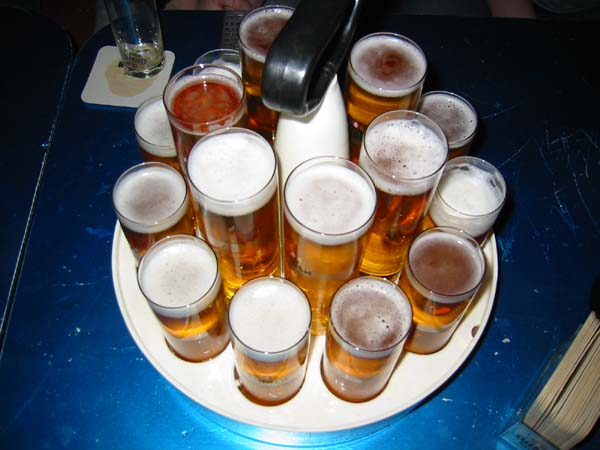
Kranz (wreath) of Kölsch

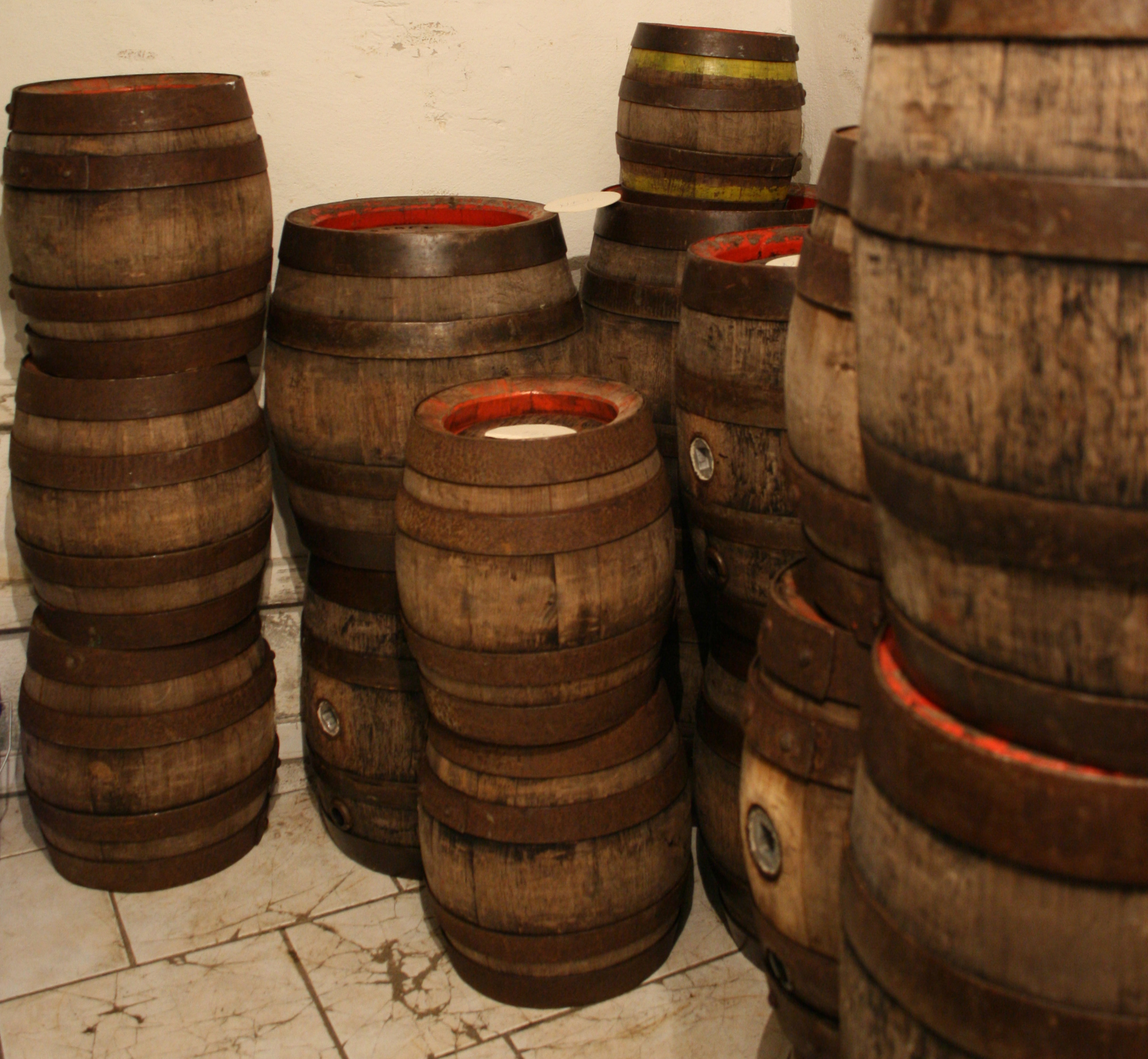
10-liter barrels of Kölsch, called "Pittermännchen"

Bottom-fermented beer started to appear in the Cologne region in the early 17th century and its popularity threatened the business interest of the brewers of Cologne, who only produced top-fermented beers. In response, the town council of Cologne in 1603 forced young brewers to swear an oath "that you prepare your beer, as of old, from good malt, good cereals, and good hops, well-boiled, and that you pitch it with top-yeast, and by no means with bottom yeast." In 1676 and again in 1698, the council again tried to legislate against bottom-fermented beer by forbidding its sale within the city walls. However, by 1750, Cologne brewers were competing against bottom-fermented beers by using a hybridized brewing process, first brewing their beer using top-fermenting yeast but then aging the beer in cold cellars like bottom-fermented beer.

This type of beer was first called Kölsch in 1918 to describe the beer that had been brewed by the Sünner brewery since 1906, developed from the similar but cloudier variant Wieß (for 'white' in the Kölsch dialect). By the start of World War II Cologne had more than forty breweries; only two were left by the end of the war.

In 1946, many of the breweries managed to re-establish themselves. In the 1940s and 1950s, Kölsch still could not match the sales of bottom-fermented beer, but in the 1960s the style began to rise in popularity in the Cologne beer market. From a production of only 500,000 hectolitres (430,000 US beer barrels) in 1960, Cologne's beer production peaked at 3.7 million hl (3.2 million US bbl) in 1980. In the 21st century, price increases and changing drinking habits caused economic hardship for many of the traditional corner bars (Kölschkneipen) and smaller breweries, and by 2005 output had declined to 2.4 million hl (2.0 million US bbl).

In 1986, 24 brewers of Cologne and vicinity agreed upon the Kölsch-Konvention, which set out the brewing process that had to be used, and restricted the use of Kölsch to breweries in Cologne, and outside the city, which had already acquired a valuable asset in the designation Kölsch before the convention came into force. For this reason, breweries from outside Cologne that had already brewed Kölsch and signed the Kölsch-Konvention in 1986 are also officially authorised to brew Kölsch. These are the two breweries Privatbrauerei Bischoff from Brühl and Erzquell Brauerei Bielstein from Wiehl. The establishment of new Kölsch breweries such as Brauerei Heller (opened 1991, closed 2024) is only permitted in Cologne.

Many breweries closed in the years that followed. Only seven of the breweries listed are still active, Früh, Gaffel, Reissdorf (the big three), Erzquell, Bischoff, Päffgen and Sünner (after the takeover by Malzmühle in 2022 and the closure of the Malzmühle brewery afterwards). Once-famous brands such as Dom, Küppers and Sion are now owned by the Radeberger Group, which no longer has a brewery in Cologne. They are contract brewed at Früh so that the beer can still be called Kölsch.

Brand	Place	Brand owner and brewery
Bischoff	Brühl	Privatbrauerei Bischoff
Dom	Cologne	Radeberger Group (Contract brew at Früh)
Früh	Cologne	Cölner Hofbräu Früh
Gaffel	Cologne	Privatbrauerei Gaffel
Gilden	Cologne	Radeberger Group (Contract brew at Früh)
Hellers	Cologne	Brauerei Heller (Contract brew at Gaffel)
Küppers	Cologne	Radeberger Group (Contract brew at Früh)
Mühlen	Cologne	Gebr. Sünner (owned by Malzmühle)
Päffgen	Cologne	Brauerei Päffgen
Peters	Cologne	Radeberger Group (Contract brew at Früh)
Reissdorf	Cologne	Privat-Brauerei Heinrich Reissdorf
Richmodis	Cologne	REWE (Contract brew at Gaffel)
Schreckenskammer	Cologne	Brauhaus Schreckenskammer (Contract brew at Früh)
Sester	Cologne	Radeberger Group (Contract brew at Früh)
Sion	Cologne	Radeberger Group (Contract brew at Früh)
Sünner	Cologne	Gebr. Sünner (owned by Malzmühle))
Zunft	Wiehl	Erzquell Brauerei Bielstein

The list includes 15 Kölsch varieties from a survey conducted by Cologne's largest tabloid newspaper Express in 2024, as well as the 2 small but independent breweries Bischoff and Päffgen.

In 1997, Kölsch became a product with protected geographical indication (PGI), expanding this protection to the entire EU.

Exports of Kölsch to the United States, Russia, Korea, China and Brazil are increasing. Exported Kölsch does not need to strictly comply with the Provisional German Beer Law, the current implementation of the Reinheitsgebot.

Brewery	Established	Annual output in hectolitres
Heinrich Reissdorf	1894	650,000
Gaffel Becker & Co	1908	500,000
Cölner Hofbräu Früh	1904	440,000

== Serving ==
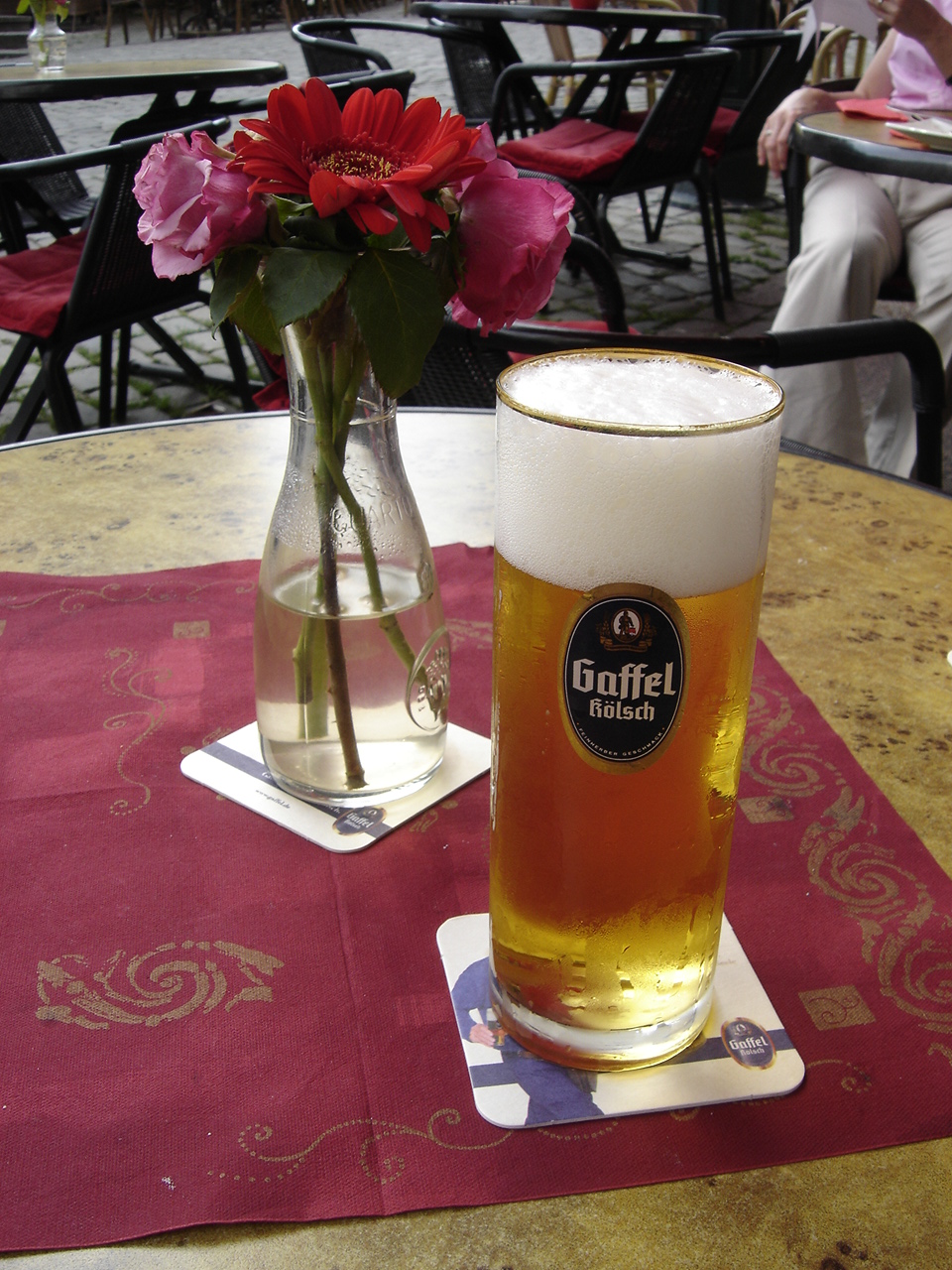
A Stange of Gaffel Kölsch in Aachen, Germany

In Cologne, Kölsch is traditionally served in a tall, thin, cylindrical 200-millilitre (6.8 US fl oz) glass called a Stange ('pole' or 'rod'). The server, called a Köbes, carries eleven or twelve Stangen in a Kranz ('wreath'), a circular tray resembling a crown or wreath. Instead of waiting for the drinker to order a refill, the Köbes immediately replaces an empty Stange with a full one, marking a tick on the coaster under the Stange. If the drinker does not want another refill, they place the coaster on top of the empty Stange and pay for the number of beers marked on the coaster.

== Outside the EU ==
Kölsch has a protected geographical indication (PGI) in the European Union. This protection is not recognized outside the EU, and many breweries elsewhere produce and market beer as Kölsch with varying degrees of authenticity.

== See also ==
- Beer in Germany
- Cream ale
- Knupp beer (Kölsches Knupp, Kölnisches Knupp, Kuletschbier), another type of beer of Colognian origin
