= Švyturys =

Lithuanian brewery

- Location: Klaipėda, Lithuania
- Opened: 1784
- Owned by: Švyturys-Utenos alus

Active beers
Name	Type
Baltas	Wheat beer

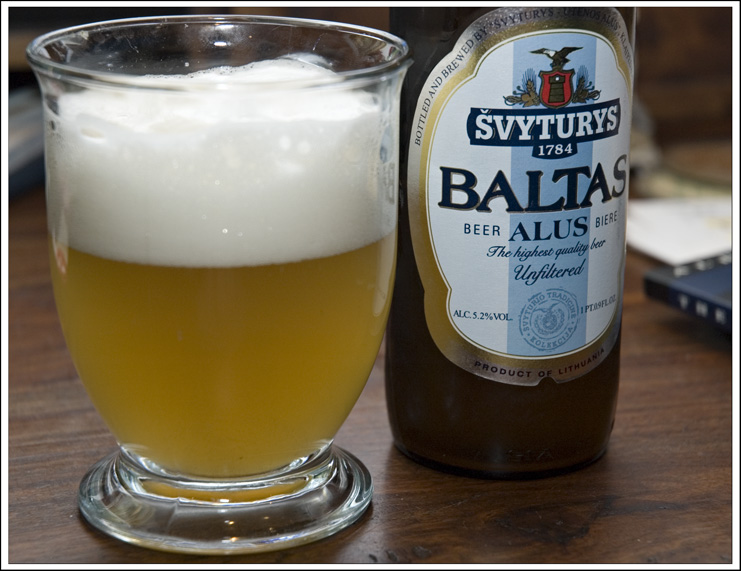
Baltas wheat beer (5.2% abv)

The Švyturys Brewery (English: Lighthouse) is Lithuania's second oldest brewery located in Klaipėda, Lithuania. It was founded in 1784 by the Reincke family of merchant seamen. The brewery is a part of Švyturys-Utenos alus and currently is owned by the Carlsberg Group, which controls Švyturys-Utenos alus through Baltic Beverages Holding.

== History ==
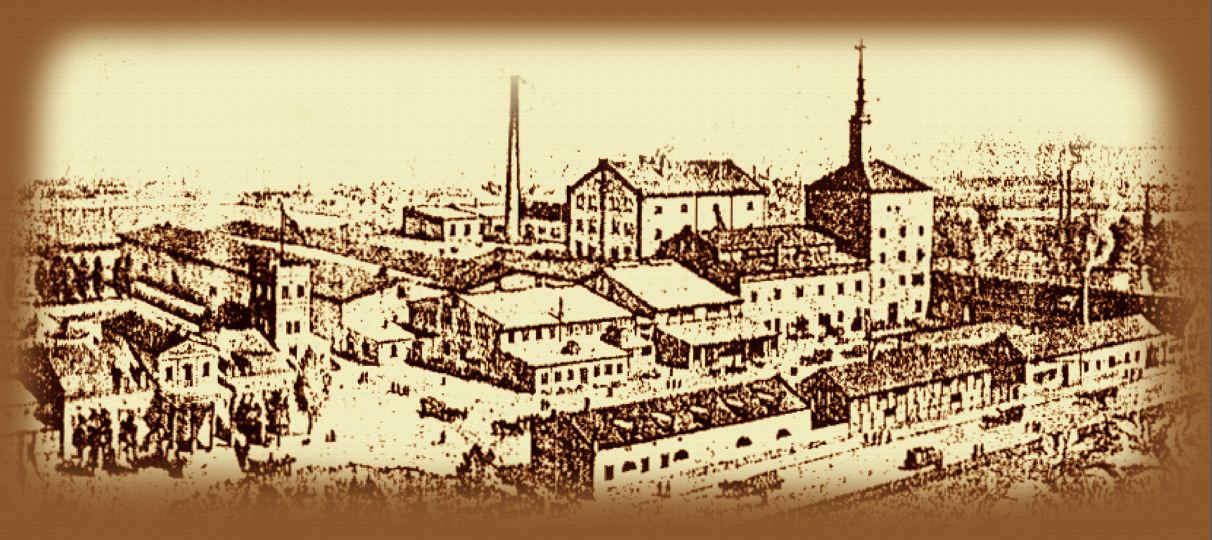
The old brewery

The brewery in Klaipėda (former German name: Memel) was founded by merchant J. W. Reincke in 1784. Since then, the brewery's emblem has been adorned with the sea eagle that is also found on the Reincke family's coat of arms. In the 19th century, this brewery in the suburb of Friedrich merged with the brewery of landowner Theodor Preuss and became the town's main beer producer. It brewed traditional Bock beer, as well as Bavarian and Porter beers. The latter received an award in the Klaipėda International Business Fair back in 1883. The shareholder-owned Klaipėda brewery was one of the most highly regarded breweries in Interwar Lithuania. The company had its own yeast factory and a warehouse of wine and liqueurs. It was also renowned for its famous Audit and Caramel beers: the latter were awarded a medal in the 1927 Agricultural Exhibition in Klaipėda.

The brewery was named Švyturys when it was rebuilt after the war and it started brewing beer in 1946. The recipe for traditional Baltijos beer that is still used to this day was developed in the 1960s. The brewery continuously expanded and had become one of the country's most modern beer-making facilities by the time Lithuania's independence was restored.

After the restoration of Lithuania's independence, Švyturys was restructured into a company with share capital. In 1999, most of the company's shares were bought by Denmark-based Carlsberg A/S, which made substantial investments in renewing its production facilities. In 2001, the breweries of Švyturys and Utenos Alus were merged into Švyturys-Utenos Alus AB (a company with share capital). In February 2003, Švyturys-Utenos Alus AB was restructured to become Švyturys-Utenos Alus UAB (private limited company).

The Švyturys Brewery still uses old German brewing technology: beer is brewed in vertical and horizontal containers that facilitate the formation of unique characteristics of the beer's taste and aroma. Among all the largest Lithuanian breweries, Švyturys is the only one to use such containers.

== Statistics ==
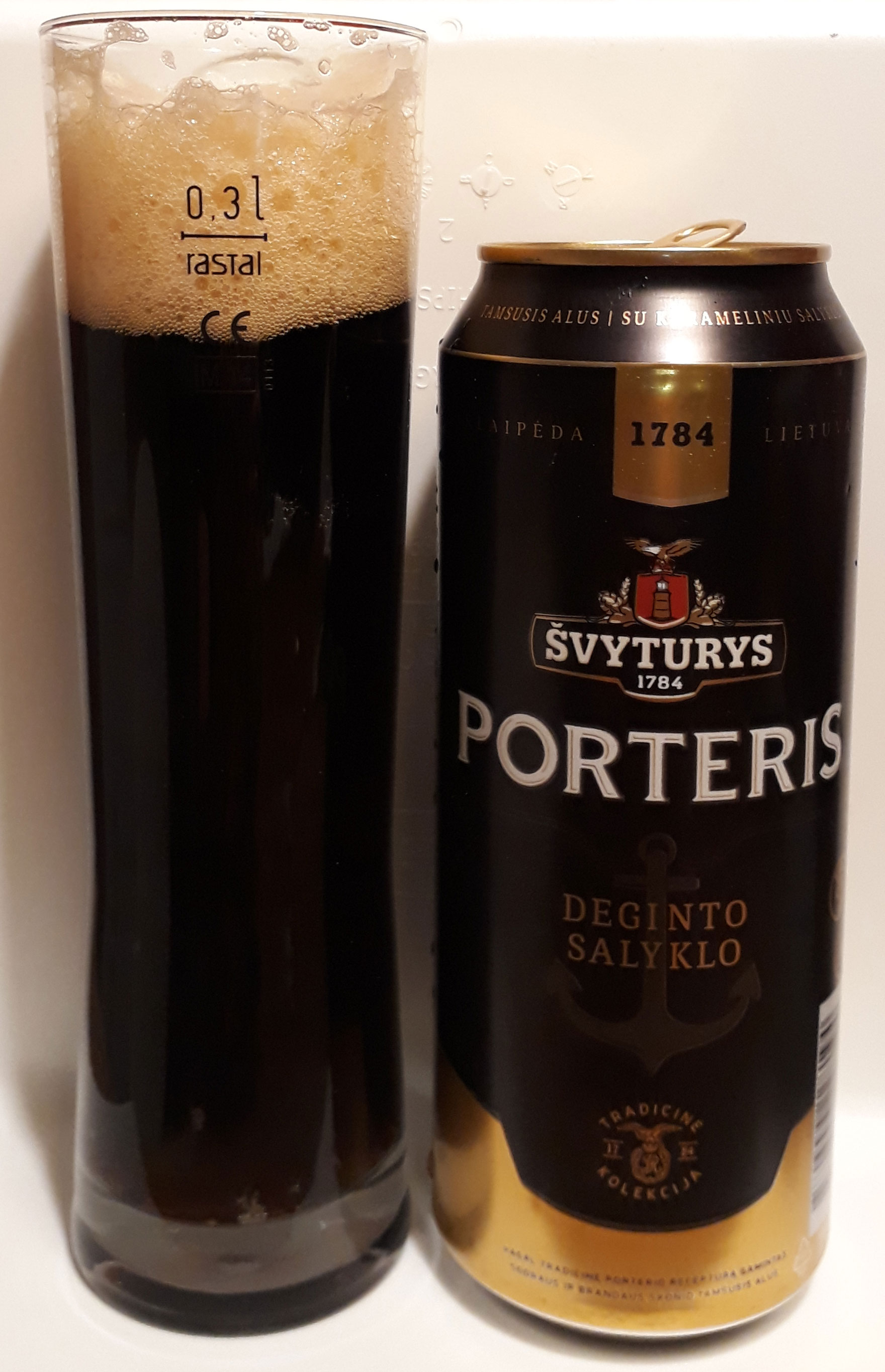
Porter, burnt malt

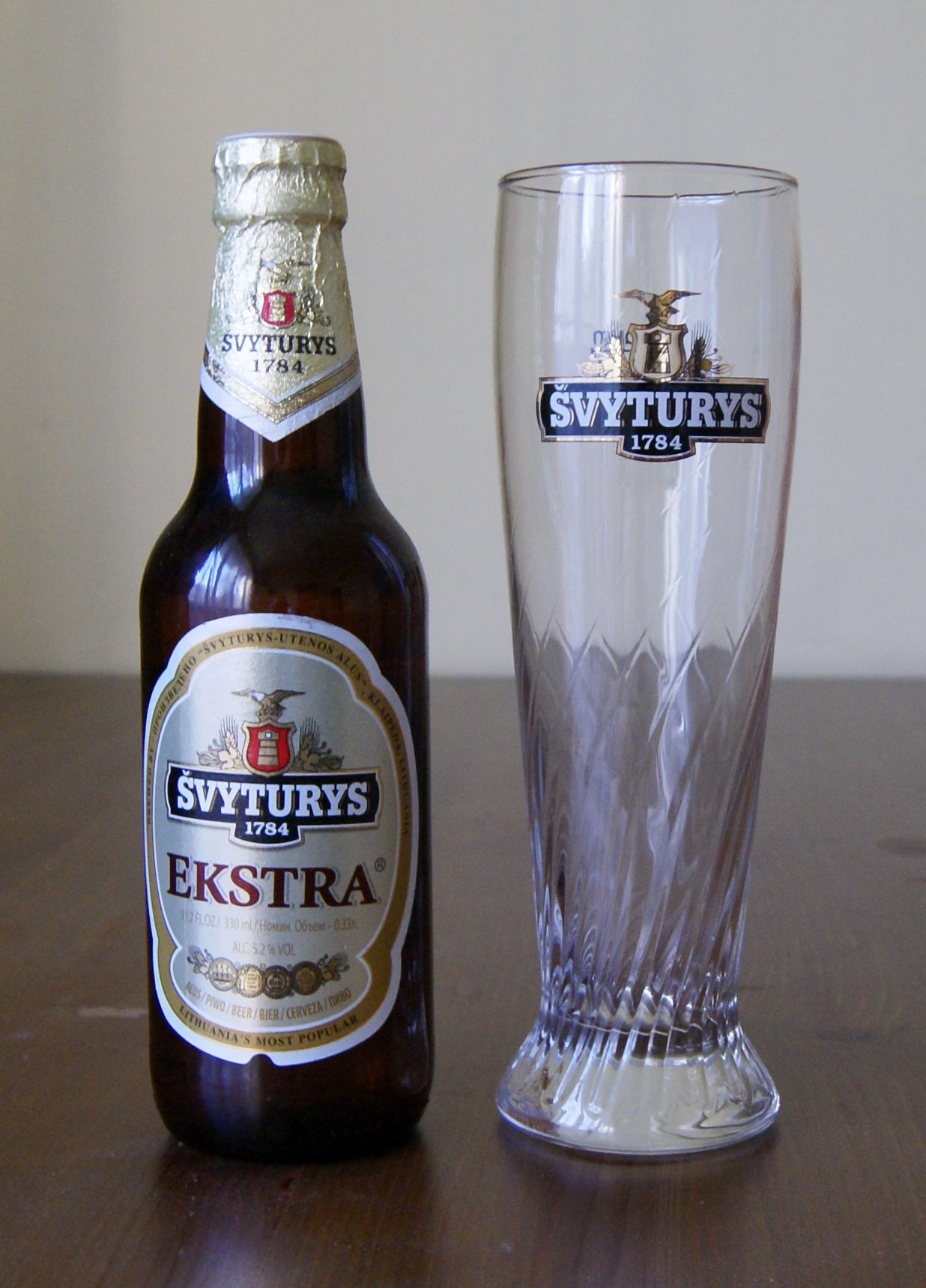
Švyturys Extra bottle and Švyturys glass

The Švyturys Brewery plans to brew 34 million litres of beer in 2012, most of which will be Extra lager. This is the most decorated Lithuanian beer: its awards include the Gold Award in the World Beer Cup 2012.

Švyturys beer is exported to more than 20 countries worldwide, including Australia, Belarus, Canada, Cyprus, Denmark, Estonia, Finland, France, Georgia, Iceland, Ireland, Israel, Italy, Latvia, the Netherlands, Norway, Poland, Russia, Spain, Sweden, the UK, Ukraine, and the US.

== Beers brewed in Švyturys ==
- „Švyturio Baltas“ (Hefeweizen);
- „Švyturio Baltijos“ (Oktoberfest/Märzen);
- „Švyturio Ekstra“ (Dortmunder/ European Export);
- „Švyturio Ekstra Draught“ (Dortmunder/ European Export);
- „Švyturio Gintarinis“ (Pilsner);
- „Švyturio Memelbrau“ (beer of special technology);
- „Švyturys Švyturio“ (Pale Lager);
- „Švyturio Stipriausias“ (German-StyleBock);
- „Švyturio Nealkoholinis“ (Lager);
- „Švyturio Old Port Ale“ (Scottish Ale);
- „Švyturio Keltų“ (English Pale Ale);
- „Švyturio 20 statinių“ (Stout);
- „Švyturio J. W. Reincke“ (Lager);
- „Švyturio Korio“ beer (Honey Lager, limited edition);
- „Švyturio Tradicinis“(MaiBock).

== Key facts about Švyturys ==
- In 1784, merchant J. W. Reincke founded a brewery in Klaipėda.
- In 1871, the breweries of Theodor Preuss and Reincke's descendants merged into the shareholder-owned brewery of Memel, which became leader among the region's beer makers for many years to come.
- In 1883, the shareholder-owned Klaipėda brewery won its first gold medal for the quality of its beer in the trade and crafts fair of the Klaipėda region (Klaipėda was then known as Memel).
- In 1927, the beer of the shareholder-owned Klaipėda brewery was one of Lithuania's most popular and received a medal in the Agricultural Exhibition in Klaipėda.
- During the war, the Klaipėda brewery was called Ostquell. It was almost completely destroyed in 1944 and rebuilt in the following years.
- In 1960, the Švyturysbrewmasters developed the recipe for Baltijos, a Märzen-style beer. Baltijos became the market leader among the beers produced by Švyturys.
- In 1973, Švyturys started making pasteurised beer, one of the first in Lithuania.
- In 1995, brewmaster Džuljeta Armonienė developed Švyturys Ekstra beer in Klaipėda. It became a standard among Lithuanian beer and won numerous international awards in the Dortmunder/European Export class.
- In 1996, the Švyturys Brewery had a new filtering system installed, which was the most modern of its kind in the beer industry at the time.
- In 1998, Švyturyswas the first Lithuanian brewery that set out to reorganise its production processes according to international quality standards. This helped the development and productionof beer that both meets international quality standards and retains the characteristics of a true Lithuanian beer.
- In 1999, the shares of Švyturys were bought by Denmark-based Carlsberg A/S.
- In 2000, Švyturys Ekstra won silver in the World Beer Cup in the USA (the Dortmunder/European Export category).
- In December 2001, the Švyturys and Utenos Alus breweries merged to become Švyturys-Utenos Alus AB.
- In 2001, Švyturys Ekstra was awarded a gold medal in the World Beer Cup in the United States (the Dortmunder category).
- In 2002, Švyturys Baltijos won bronze in the World Beer Cup in the United States (the Oktoberfest/Märzen category).
- In 2003, the first beer in the Traditional Collection was brewed in Klaipėda: Baltas wheat beer.
- In 2004, Švyturys Ekstra was awarded a gold medal in the Stockholm beer festival (Lager category).
- In 2004, regular exports of Švyturys Ekstra to the United States began.
- In 2004, Jubiliejinis 1784 premium lager was brewed using the Krӓusening process to commemorate the brewery's anniversary.
- According to a 2004 survey by AC Nielsen, Švyturys is considered not only the best beer produced in Lithuania (96 per cent of respondents), but also a Lithuanian product that merits national pride (83 per cent of respondents).
- In 2005, Švyturys Ekstra Draught became the only gold medallist in the beer category of the Lithuanian Product of the Year 2005 contest organised by the Lithuanian Confederation of Industrialists.
- Since 2005, Švyturys has invited visitorsto the brewery's exhibition.
- In 2007, the Švyturys Brewery started brewing Adler Bock, a Bock-style beer.
- In 2008, Švyturys Baltijos won the Big Gold Medal and Švyturys Baltas the Small Silver Medal at the international Siberian Fair.
- In 2009, three of the Švyturys Brewery's beers – Švyturys Ekstra Draught, Švyturys Baltas and Švyturys Baltijos – were awarded silver and gold medals at the Australian International Beer Awards (AIBA).
- In 2009, Švyturys Baltas wheat beer won the silver award in the World Beer Championships 2009, an international beer tasting contest organised by the independent Beverage Testing Institute in Chicago (USA).
- In 2009 to commemorate the 225th anniversary of the brewery, the brewers at Švyturys introduced the Švyturys Traditional Collection – classic beers inold-fashioned embossed bottles.
- In 2009, Švyturys Nefiltruotas beer was first bottled in the Švyturys Brewery.
- In 2011, the dark Baltijos beer and the naturally strong Adler Bock from the Švyturys Traditional Collection each received the highest 3-star Superior Taste Award from the Brussels-based International Taste & Quality Institute (iTQi), which unites the best European chefs and sommeliers
- In 2011, the dark Švyturys Baltijos and the naturally strong Švyturys Adler Bock won the highest 3-star Superior Taste Award in the iTQi contest.
- In 2012, the renewed Švyturys Ekstra won the gold medal in the most prestigious international beer competition, the World Beer Cup.
- In 2012, the dark Švyturys Baltijos won the highest 3-star Superior Taste Award in the iTQi contest.
- In 2013 Švyturys beers Baltijos, Baltas and Old Port Ale won Superior Taste Awards. It was the third one for Baltijos, so Baltijos were awarded with Crystal start.

== Social responsibility ==
The sponsorship philosophy of Švyturys is to support the best we have in Lithuania. The Švyturys Brewery is a major sponsor of Lithuanian sports, culture and art.

The company pays particular attention to the region of Klaipėda. In 2012, Švyturys-Utenos alus signed an agreement to create the Švyturys Klaipėda Origin Fund. The fund encompasses three types of social programme: sport, culture and communities. For many years, Švyturys beer has sponsored Lithuania's largest city festival, the Klaipėda Sea Festival. The company also sponsors Žuvėdra (a Klaipėda dancesport club), the Neptūnas basketball team, the annual Curonian Lagoon Regatta and the Klaipėda Jazz Festival, and makes contributions to the Meridian support fund. In addition, the brewery continues to support the Švyturio Art Dock and Švyturio Arena. Švyturys initiated the replanting of the area of Smiltynė forest destroyed in a fire, has contributed money to coastal sand dune restoration and sponsored the Tall Ships Races Baltic 2009 regatta of old sailboats.

Švyturys was the first Lithuanian beer maker to contribute to promoting harmony between the food and beer: it organises special events and educational sessions on this topic and carries out publishing projects about beer-drinking culture. These are aimed at the general public and those working in the catering sector.

Since 2004, Švyturys-Utenos Alus has been a regular sponsor of the Lithuanian National Olympic Committee.

Basketball receives the largest share of Švyturys-Utenos Alus support. The sponsored teams include the Lithuanian national basketball team, Vilnius Lietuvos Rytas, Klaipėda Neptūnas and Utena Juventus.The company also supports the amateur basketball leagues in Vilnius, Kaunas and Klaipėda. In addition, Švyturys-Utenos Alus was the official sponsor of EuroBasket 2011, the European Basketball Championship hosted by Lithuania.

Every year, the company initiates the ‘Operos Švyturiai’ (‘Lighthouses of the Opera’) awards for the best opera and ballet soloists.

== The Brewery Museum ==
In cooperation with the Klaipėda Tourism and Culture Information Centre, the Švyturys Brewery invites visitors to the brewery's exhibition. Its address is Kulių vartų str. 7, Klaipėda.
