= List of breweries in Arizona =

This is a list of breweries in Arizona.

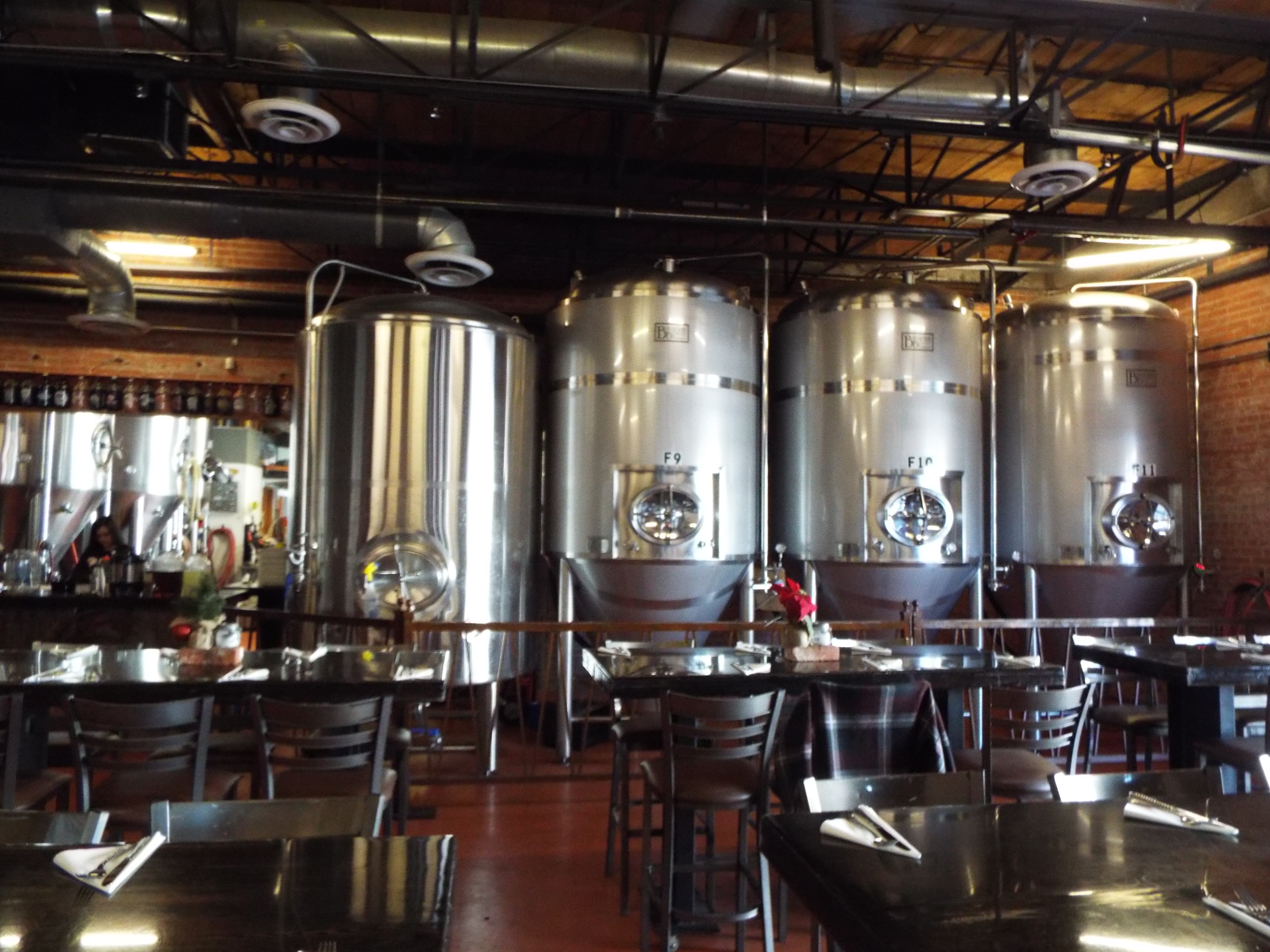
Inside the San Tan Brewery in Chandler, Arizona

- 8-Bit Aleworks: Avondale
- 1912 Brewing Company: Tucson
- Arizona Wilderness Brewing Company: Gilbert
- Barrio Brewing Company: Tucson
- Beast Brewing Company: Bisbee Closed 2016.
- Beaver Street Brewery: Flagstaff
- Black Bridge Brewery: Kingman
- Black Horse Brewery: Show Low
- Button Brew House: Tucson AZ
- College Street Brewhouse: Lake Havasu
- Copper City Brewing Company: Douglas (Closed)
- Copper Mine Brewing Company: Tucson
- Dark Sky Brewing Co.: Flagstaff
- Desert Eagle Brewing Company: Mesa
- Dubina Brewing Company (now Throne. Brewing): Glendale
- Electric Brewing: Bisbee
- Four Peaks Brewery: Scottsdale
- Four Peaks Brewing Company: Tempe
- Goldwater Brewing Company: Scottsdale
- Harbottle Brewing Company: Tucson
- Historic Brewing Company: Flagstaff
- Huss Brewing Company: Tempe, AZ
- Kitsune Brewing Company: Phoenix
- LazyG Brewhouse: Prescott, AZ
- Lumberyard Brewing Company: Flagstaff
- Mother Bunch Brewing (now closed), Phoenix
- Mother Road Brewing Company: Flagstaff
- Old Bisbee Brewing Company: Bisbee
- Papago Brewing (now closed): Scottsdale
- Pedal Haus Brewery: Tempe Opened 2015; production moved to Chandler in 2023. Additional locations in Chandler (2020), Phoenix (2021) and Mesa (2024). Gold medal, Great American Beer Festival 2018 (Belgian Wit); Arizona Craft Brewers Guild Brewery of the Year 2023.
- Peoria Artisan Brewery: Peoria
- The Perch Pub & Brewery: Chandler
- The Phoenix Ale Brewery: Phoenix
- SanTan Brewing Company: Chandler
- Scottsdale Beer Company: Scottsdale
- Thunder Canyon Brewery: Tucson
- Tombstone Brewing Company: Tombstone
- Two Brothers Tap House and Brewery: Scottsdale

State 48 Brewery surprise, State 48 Lager House, State 48 Rock House, State 48 DTPHX, State 48 Tap House Gilbert, State 48 Funk House.

- Wanderlust Brewing Company: Flagstaff
- Wren House Brewing: Phoenix

== See also ==
- Beer in the United States
- List of breweries in the United States
- List of microbreweries
