= Aldaris =

Aldaris may refer to:

- Aldaris, a character of the StarCraft series
- Aldaris Brewery, owned by Latvian company Baltic Beverages Holding
