= Švyturys-Utenos alus =

Beverage company based in Lithuania

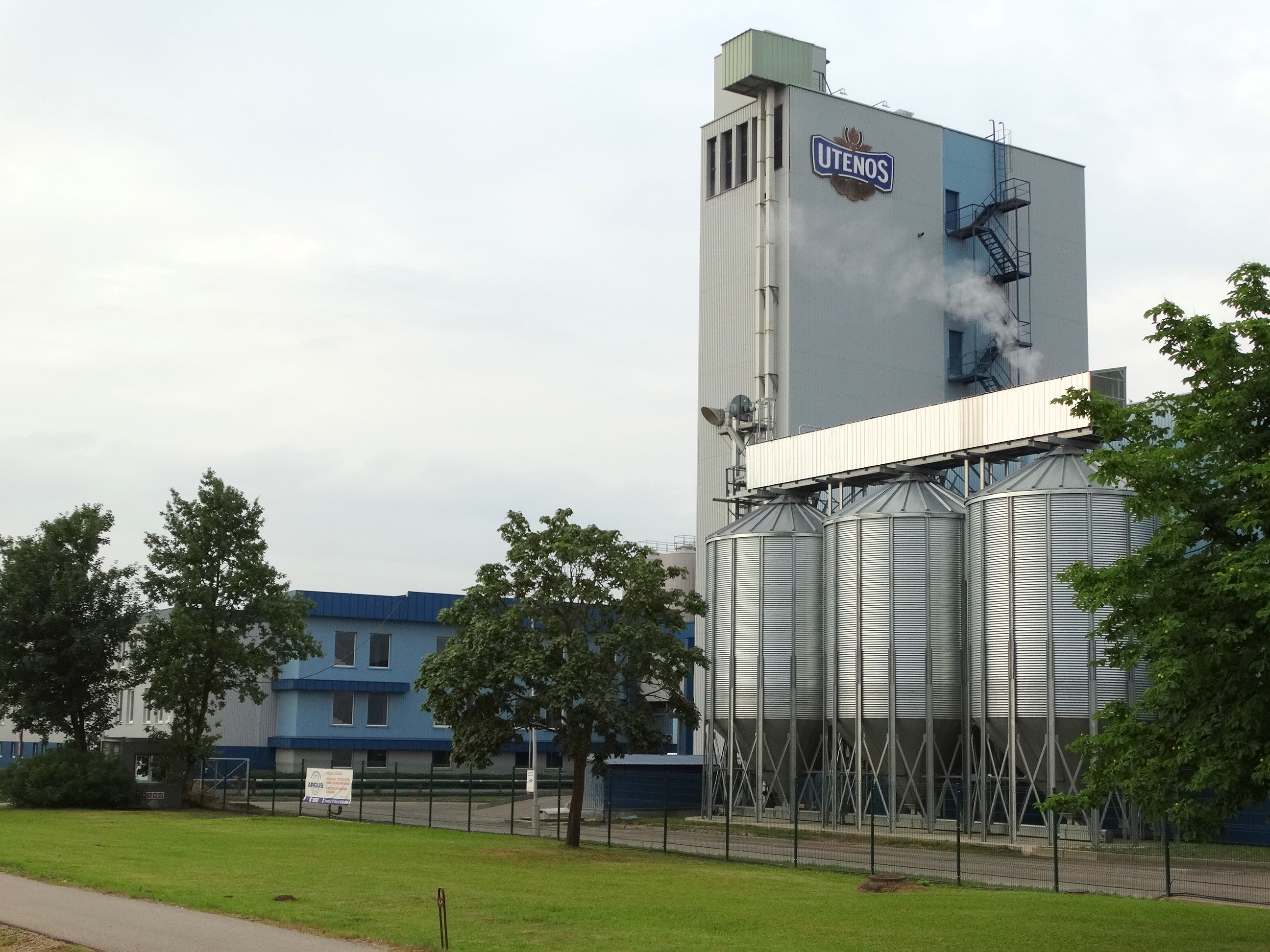
- Brewery in Utena
- Founded: December 2001
- Headquarters: Vilnius, Lithuania
- Key people: Rolandas Viršilas (CEO)
- Products: Beer, soft drinks
- Revenue: ▲€113.926 million (2023)
- Operating income: ▲€6.0 million (2023)
- Net income: ▲€5.2 million (2023)
- Owner: Carlsberg Group
- Number of employees: 428
- Website: www.svyturys.eu

Švyturys-Utenos Alus UAB is a Lithuanian beverage company. It comprises the two largest breweries in Lithuania – Švyturys in Klaipėda and Utenos Alus in Utena – and specialised establishments nationwide.

In 1999, most of the shares in Lithuania's two leading breweries were bought by Denmark-based Carlsberg A/S, the world's fourth-largest beer producer. In 2001, the breweries of Švyturys and Utenos Alus were merged into Švyturys-Utenos Alus UAB, which became a part of the Carlsberg Group in 2008.

Švyturys-Utenos Alus UAB produces beer, beer cocktails, cider, alcoholic cocktails, soft drinks, drinking water and kvass. The company sold over 185 million liters of beer in 2014. Švyturys-Utenos Alus UAB also exports beverages worldwide – almost to 30 countries around the globe.

== Key facts ==
- In 1784, the Švyturys Brewery was established in Klaipėda.
- In 1977, the Utenos Alus Brewery started operating in Utena.
- In 1997, Baltic Beverages Holding (BBH), controlled at the time by the companies Hartwall (Finland) and Orkla (Norway), became the main shareholder in the Utenos Alus Brewery. BBH already controlled the Kalnapilis Brewery in Panevėžys.
- In 1999, Carlsberg A/S acquired 95 per cent of the shares in Švyturys AB.
- In 1999, Švyturys became the main sponsor of Lithuania's national basketball team.
- In 2000, Carlsberg A/S merged with Norway-based Orkla and thus acquired control of the three largest Lithuanian breweries – Švyturys, Kalnapilis and Utenos Alus.
- In 2001, BBH sold Kalnapilis to the Denmark-based Danish Brewery Group (now The Royal Unibrew), under an order from the Lithuanian Competition Council.
- In 2001, BBH merged Švyturys and Utenos Alus into accompany with share capital called Švyturys-Utenos Alus AB.
- In 2003, Švyturys-Utenos Alus AB was restructured to become private limited company Švyturys-Utenos Alus UAB.
- According to a 2004 survey by AC Nielsen, Švyturys and Utenos Alus are the two strongest brands in the Lithuanian beer industry and deserve the most national pride.
- In 2004, Švyturys-Utenos Alus signed a long-term sponsorship agreement with the Lithuanian National Olympic Committee.
- In 2006, Švyturys-Utenos Alus joined the international Global Compact initiative.
- In 2008, the Carlsberg Group bought the shares that British company Scottish & Newcastle held in BBH and thus acquired a controlling stake in Švyturys-Utenos Alus UAB.

== Production ==
Švyturys-Utenos Alus makes the following products: beer, beer cocktails, cider, alcoholic cocktails, drinking water, soft drinks and kvass.

Trademarks of Švyturys-Utenos Alus:

- Švyturys beer;
- Utenos beer;
- Carlsberg beer;
- Blindos beer;
- D-light beer cocktails;
- Kiss cider;
- Somersby cider;
- Zip alcoholic cocktails;
- Vichy Classique drinking water;
- Vichy Fresh soft drinks;
- Vichy Juicy soft drinks;
- Vichy Classique Vivasport soft drinks.

== Statistics ==
In 2014, Švyturys-Utenos Alus UAB produced and sold 185,06 million litres of drinks, 6,8% more than in 2013. In 2013 Švyturys-Utenos Alus UAB took 40,6% of Lithuanian beer market. According to the sales Švyturys and Utenos brands have taken first two places in the market.

Company increased its market share not only in beer sector, but also in other drinks markets – 2,3% in drinking water market (17,2%). Last year Švyturys-Utenos alus reached more than 40% in cider market.

In 2014 Švyturys-Utenos alus increased its export of drinks. Export grew up 39%. Company exported 49,45 million litres.
