= Ayinger Brewery =

German brewery

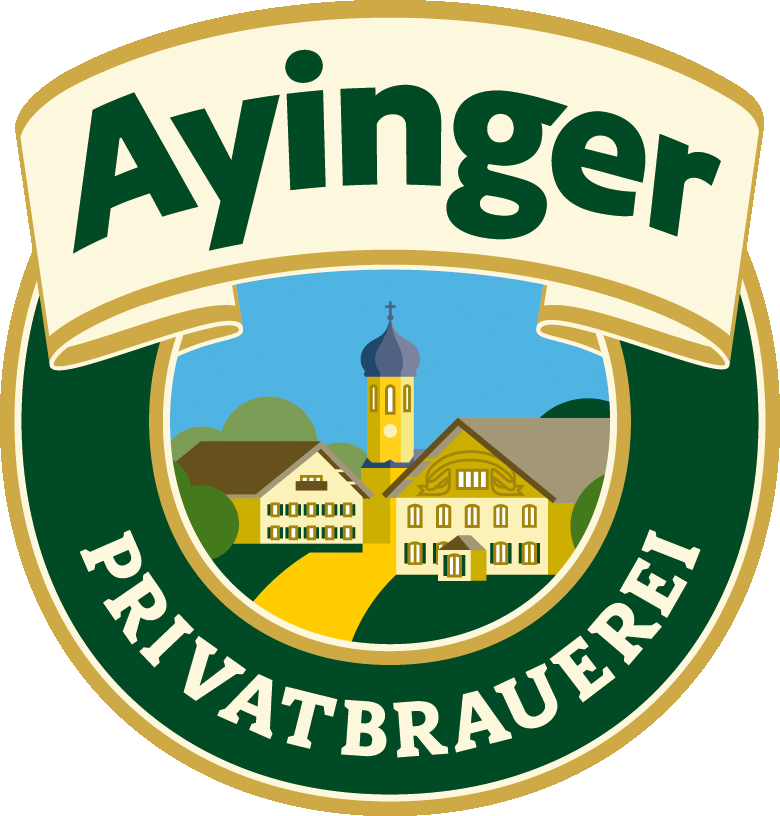
- Interactive map of Ayinger Brewery
- Location: Aying, Germany
- Coordinates: 47°58′19″N 11°46′26″E
- Opened: 1877
- Annual production volume: 140,000 hectolitres (120,000 US bbl)
- Owner: independent

Active beers
Name	Type
Celebrator	Doppelbock
Altbairisch Dunkel	Dunkel
Kellerbier	Kellerbier
Jahrhundert Bier	Helles
Lager Hell	Helles
Bavarian Pils	Pilsner
Bräuweisse	Weißbier
Leichte Bräuweisse	light Weißbier
Ur-Weisse	dark Weißbier

Seasonal beers
Name	Type
Oktober Fest-Märzen	Märzen
Kirtabier	dark Märzen
Maibock	Maibock
Frühlingsbier	Kellerbier
Weizenbock	strong Weißbier
Winter Bock	Doppelbock

Ayinger Brewery (/ˈaɪ.ɪŋɡər/ EYE-ing-gər; German: Brauerei Aying) is in Aying, Bavaria, Germany, about 25 km south of Munich. Ayinger beers are exported to Italy, the United States, and the rest of Europe.

== Licensed production in UK ==
For some years, a range of beer was brewed under the Ayingerbrau name by Samuel Smith Old Brewery in Tadcaster, England. Although the Ayinger logo was used, the recipes and range were different from those of the Ayinger Brewery. The arrangement ended in spring 2006, at which point Samuel Smith's rebranded the beers. Distribution of the Ayinger range of beer followed that summer.

== Oktoberfest ==
Because the Oktoberfest in Munich does not allow breweries outside its city limits to participate, Ayinger Brewery organizes many smaller festivals in the countryside around Munich.

== Awards ==
=== World Beer Championships ===
==== 2007 World Beer Championships ====
Ayinger posted these results at the 2007 World Beer Championships:

- Celebrator Doppelbock - highest rated Doppelbock style
- Jahrhundert-Bier - highest rated Munich Helles style
- Oktober Fest-Märzen - highest rated Vienna Märzen style
- Altbairisch Dunkel - 2nd highest rated Dark Lager style

==== Prior Years ====
Since 1994, Ayinger has received these awards:

- Celebrator Doppelbock - 2005 Platinum Medal Winner
- 1994, 1995, 1996, 1997: Top Ten Breweries in the World
- 2003, 2004, and 2005 Ayinger received a first-place award for every beer entered

=== German Agricultural Society International Competition ===
In the Deutsche Landwirtschafts Gesellschaft (DLG) Competition, Ayinger earned these medals:

- Jahrhundert-Bier - 1997 Gold medal, 1998 Gold, 2000 Gold, 2001-2004 Silver medal, 2005 Gold
- Bräu-Hell - 2001 Gold, 2003-2005 Gold
- Bräu-Weisse - 1997 Gold, 1998 Gold, 2000 Gold, 2001 Silver, 2002-2005 Gold
- Ur-Weiße - 2004 Gold, 2005 Gold
- Altbairisch-Dunkel - 1997 Gold, 1998 Silver, 2001 Silver, 2003-2005 Gold
- Leichte Bräu-Weisse - 1998 Silver, 2000 Silver

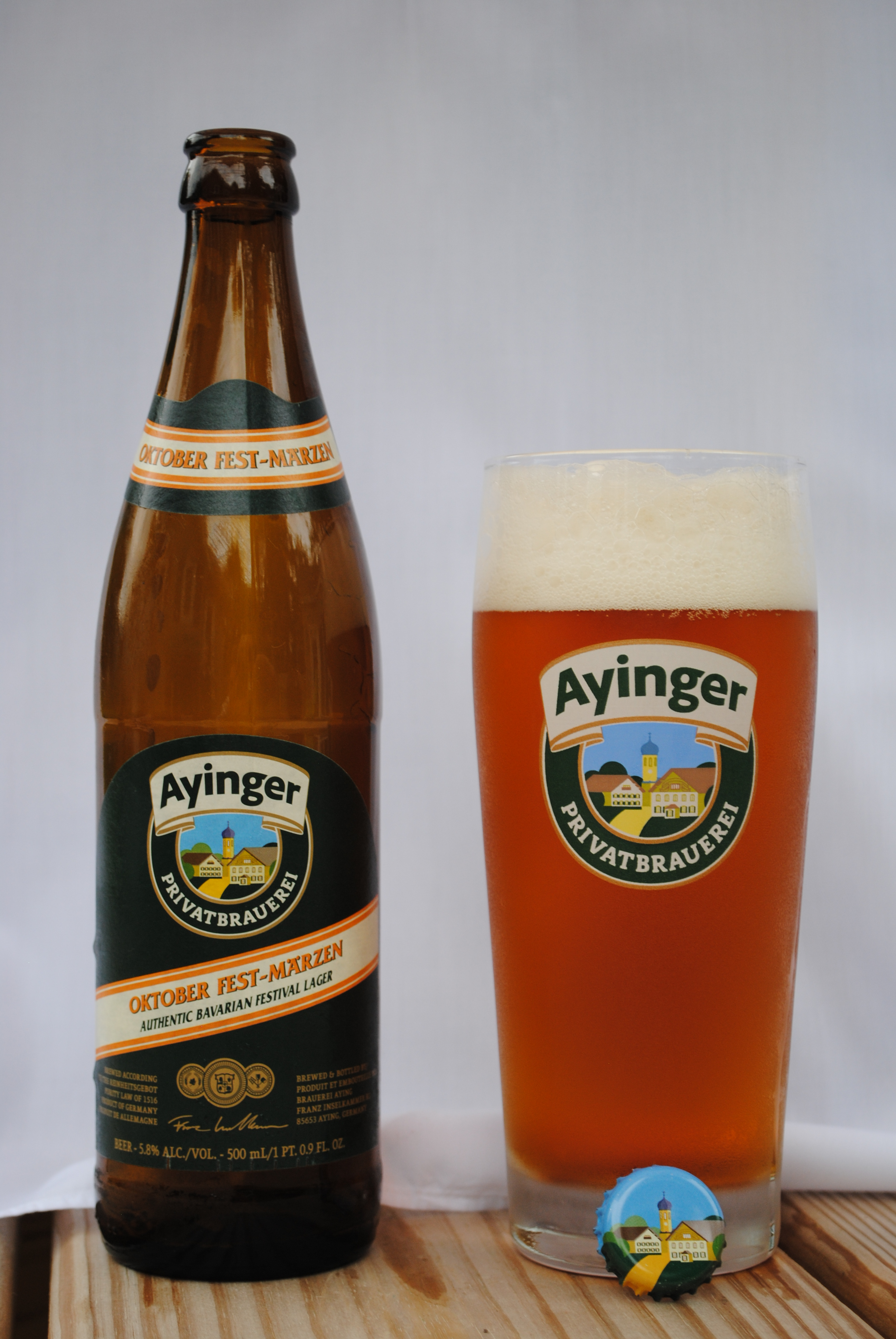
Ayinger Oktoberfest Maerzen beer bottle and glass

== See also ==
- German beer
