= Murau Brewery =

Brewery in Murau, Austria

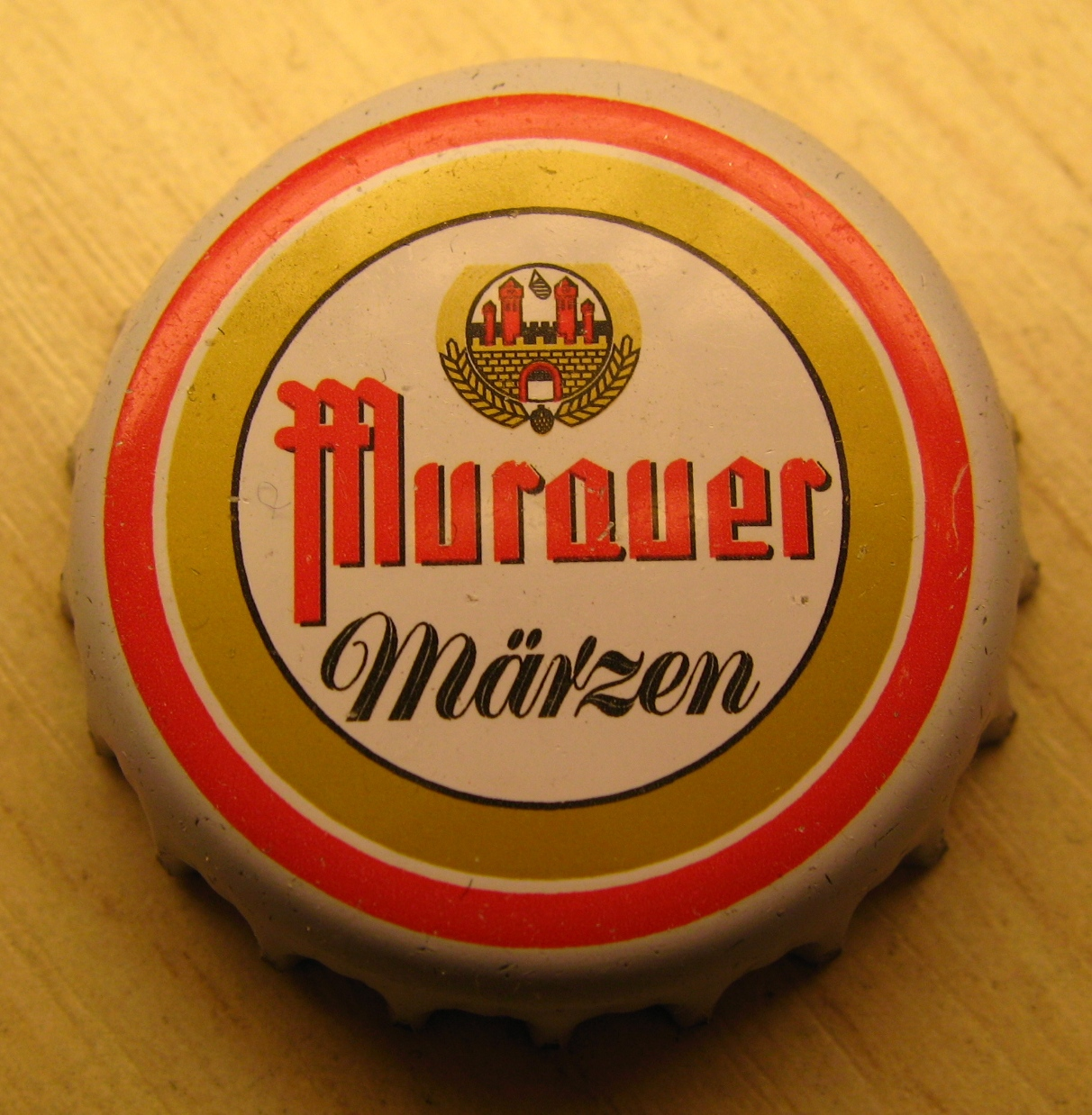
- Location: Raffaltplatz 19-23, Murau (Murau District), Austria
- Coordinates: 47°6′38.8″N 14°9′56.06″E
- Opened: 1495; 530 years ago
- Key people: Josef Rieberer (Managing Director)
- Annual production volume: 300,000 hectolitres
- Revenue: €34.3 million
- Owned by: Obermurtal Brewery Cooperative
- Employees: 180
- Website: https://www.murauerbier.at/brauerei-der-sinne/

The Murau Brewery or Brauerei Murau, is located in the Styrian town of Murau, Austria. It was founded in 1495 and has been a cooperative brewery since 1910. The brewery is one of Austria's five biggest breweries, producing around 300,000 hectolitres of beer every year.

== History ==
In the mid 15th century, Murau boasted three breweries. Established in 1495 by Jörg Kurz at Raffaltplatz, Murau Brewery stands as the sole survivor among them. Valentin Bauer, the first elected mayor of Murau, and owner of the brewery from 1823 to 1856 expanded the area of the brewery to the current size. Anton Kindler undertook costly modernisation efforts from 1873 to 1873, such as buying new machinery and switching to steam power. Gustav Balzer took over in 1896. He again invested heavily but got into financial trouble, forcing the transformation into a cooperative by 1910.

After a struggle to survive through the 1920s and 1930s, the brewery nearly collapsed during the Second World War, only starting to slowly recover in 1946. During the 1980s and 1990s, the brewing volume saw a significant increase through successful market strategies, rising from 65,000 hectolitres in 1980 to 304,000 hectolitres in 2011. In 2021, the brewery, along with nine other founding members, co-founded the "Association of Independent Private Breweries" in Austria.

== See also ==
- Beer in Austria
