= Švyturys Arena =

Sports venue in Klaipėda, Lithuania

Švyturio Arena

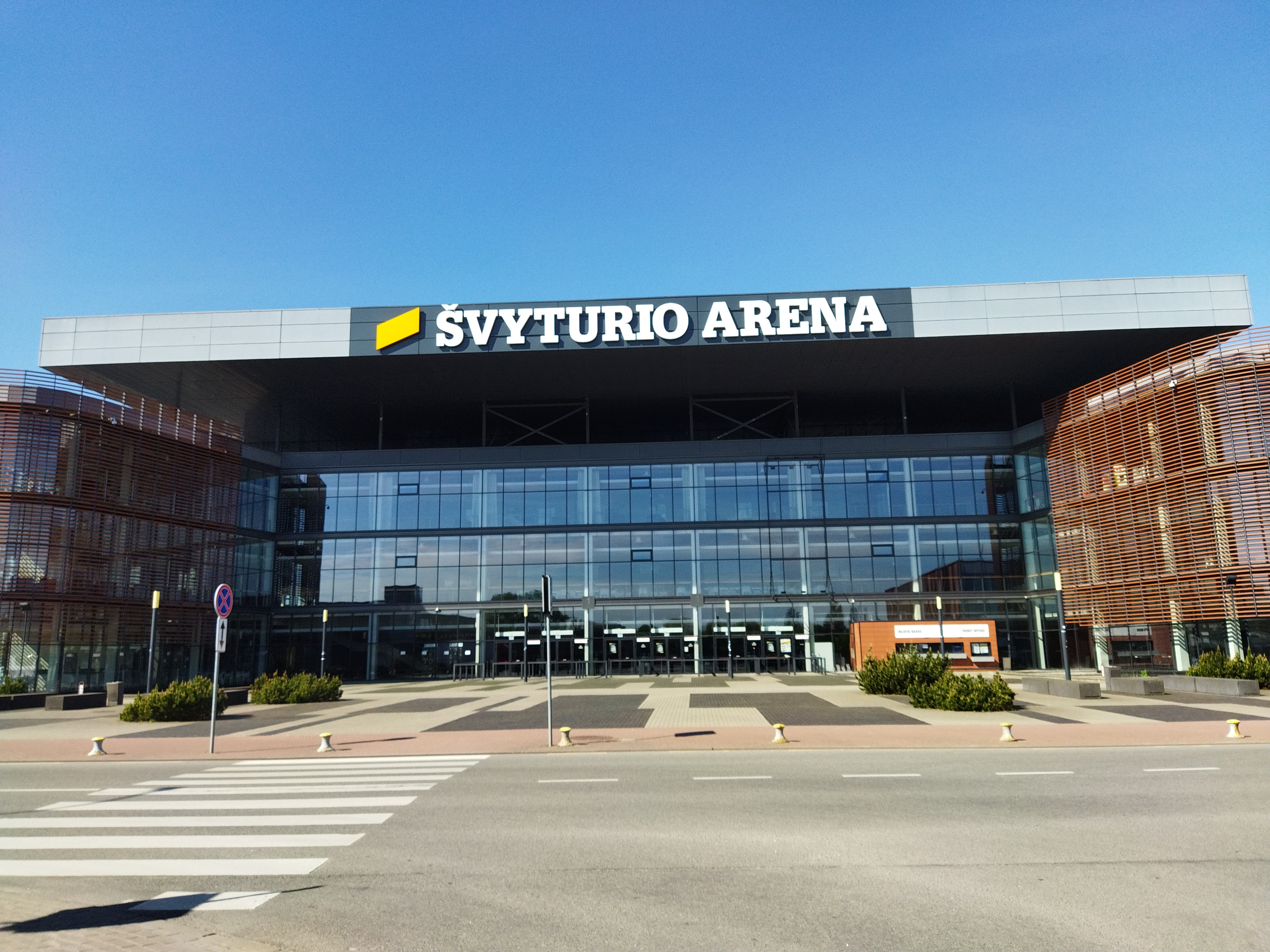
- Interactive map of Švyturio Arena
- Address: Dubysos g. 10
- Location: Klaipėda, Lithuania
- Coordinates: 55°41′15.04″N 21°9′7.67″E
- Owner: Švyturys, Klaipėda city municipality
- Capacity: Basketball: 6,200; Ice hockey: 4,416; Concerts: 7,500; Boxing/Wrestling: 6,512

Construction
- Groundbreaking: October, 2009
- Opened: July 28, 2011
- Cost: €16 Million
- Architect: AB „Miestprojektas“ Kaunas
- General contractor: Vėtrūna

Tenant
- BC Neptūnas

Website
- svyturioarena.lt

Švyturio Arena (English: Lighthouse Arena) is an indoor arena in Klaipėda, Lithuania. The arena is named after the company Švyturys, which bought the rights for the name. The capacity of the catamaran-shaped arena is 6,200 seats for basketball games, 4,416 for ice hockey games, 6,512 for boxing/wrestling matches, and 7,450 seats for concerts.

== History ==
Klaipėda Arena held Group D matches of the 37th FIBA European Basketball Championship, from 31 August, to 5 September 2011.

Klaipėda Arena hosted some matches for the 2021 FIFA Futsal World Cup.

In 2027, it will host matches for the FIBA Women's EuroBasket.

== See also ==
- List of indoor arenas in Lithuania
