= Beer in Austria =

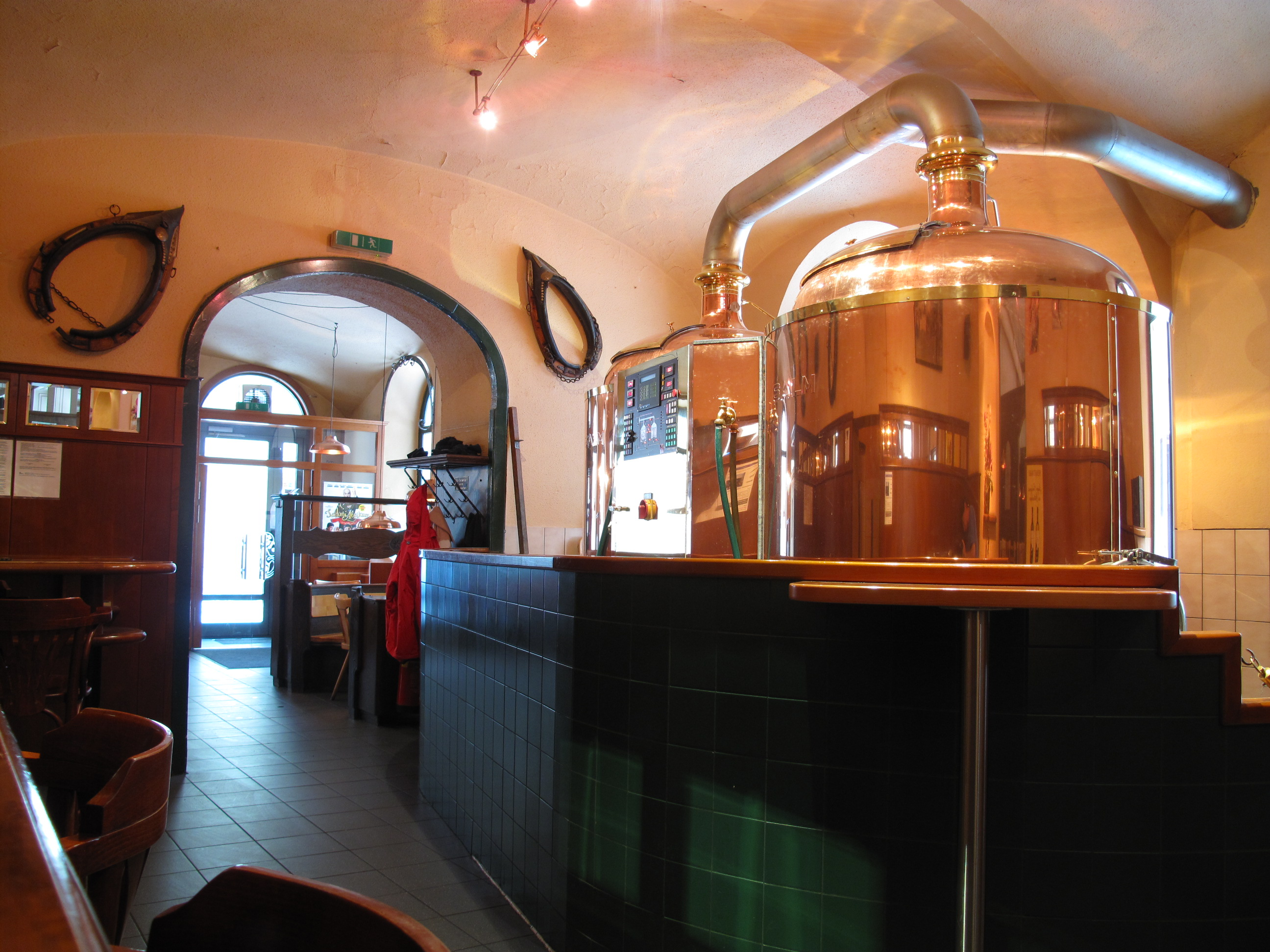
Wieden Bräu, a typical Viennese microbrewery. The copper brewing equipment is in the center of the establishment, frequently surrounded by tables for the customers.

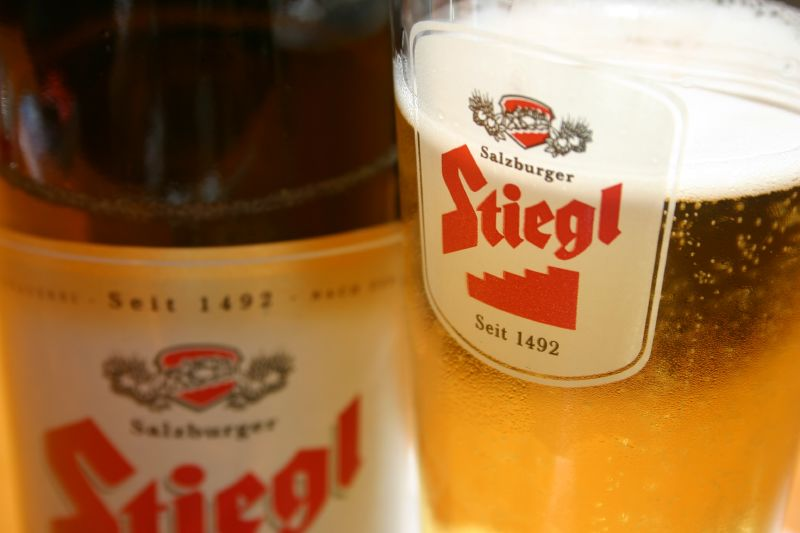
Bottle and glass of Stiegl beer

Beer in Austria comes in a wide variety of styles. There are many small breweries across the country, although a few large breweries dominate the market. The most common beer is Märzen.

== Breweries ==
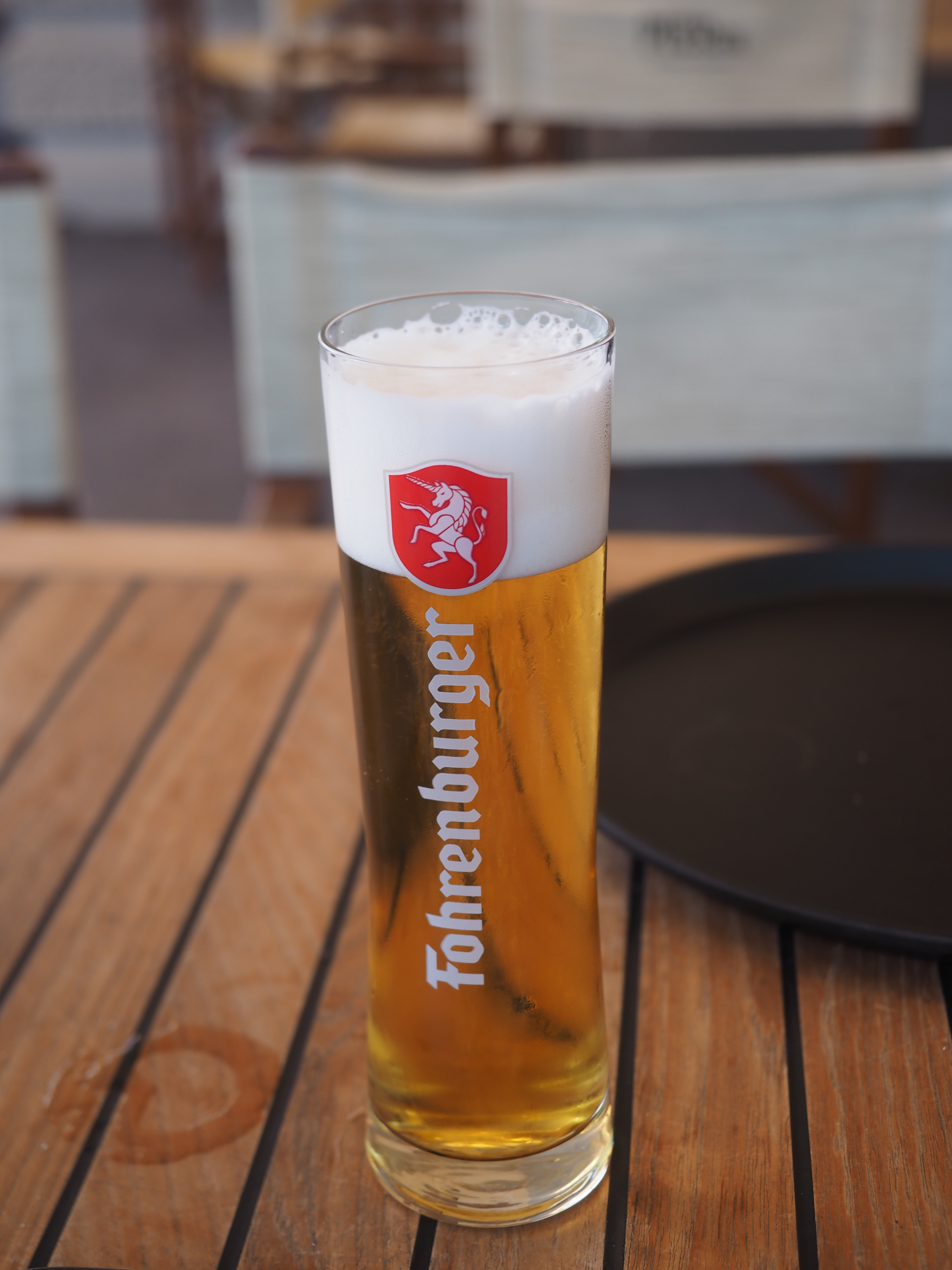
A glass of Fohrenburger beer in Bregenz, Vorarlberg

Styrian breweries, in the south, include Gösser, Puntigamer, and Murauer. Hirter is produced in the town of Hirt in Carinthia. In Lower Austria, Egger, Zwettler, Schwechater, and Wieselburger are brewed, and in Vienna Ottakringer.

From the more westerly parts of Austria come Kaiser, Zipfer and Kapsreiter in Upper Austria. Freistadt in Upper Austria is also home to Freistädter Bier, a brewery owned and operated by those who own a house within the city walls. Continuing West, Salzburg is home to Stiegl, as well as Augustiner Bräu and Edelweiss. Weizenbier (wheat beer) is the most popular type of beer in this region. From Tyrol and Vorarlberg come Falkenstein, Frastanzer, Mohrenbräu, Starkenberger, Zillertaler, Fohrenburger and Der Wilde (Wildschönau Brewery).

=== Slogans ===
- Freistädter - "Frisch. Frei. Freistädter." ("Fresh. Free. Freistädter.")
- Gösser - "Gut, besser, Gösser." ("Good, better, Gösser.")
- Stiegl - "Es muss ein Stiegl sein." ("It's got to be a Stiegl.")
- Egger - "My home is my Egger."
- Puntigamer - "Das 'bierige' Bier." ("The 'beery' beer.")
- Ottakringer - "Warum erfrischt mich das Ottakringer bloß so? Bloß so." ("Why does Ottakringer refresh me just like that? Just like that.")
- Villacher - "Die brau'n sich was, die Kärntner!" (a play on words - brew (brauen) and dare (trauen) rhyme in the German language. They know to brew something, those Carinthians!)
- Kaiser - "Hast ein Kaiser, bist ein Kaiser." ("Got a Kaiser, then you are a Kaiser.", "Kaiser" is the German word for Emperor deriving from Caesar)
- Zipfer - "Ein Glas heller Freude." ("A glass of delightful joy", a play on words - "helle Freude" means "delightful joy", but "Helles" is also a type of beer)
- Murauer - "Rein das Beste." ("Purely the best.")

=== Stiegl ===
One of the most common brands of beer to be found in Austria is Stiegl ("little stair" or "little step"), founded in 1492. Stiegl brews both a helles (a light lager) and a Weissbier (Hefeweizen), as well as other specialty beers, including a grapefruit Radler. Stiegl is the most popular beer of Austria that isn't owned by Brau Union.

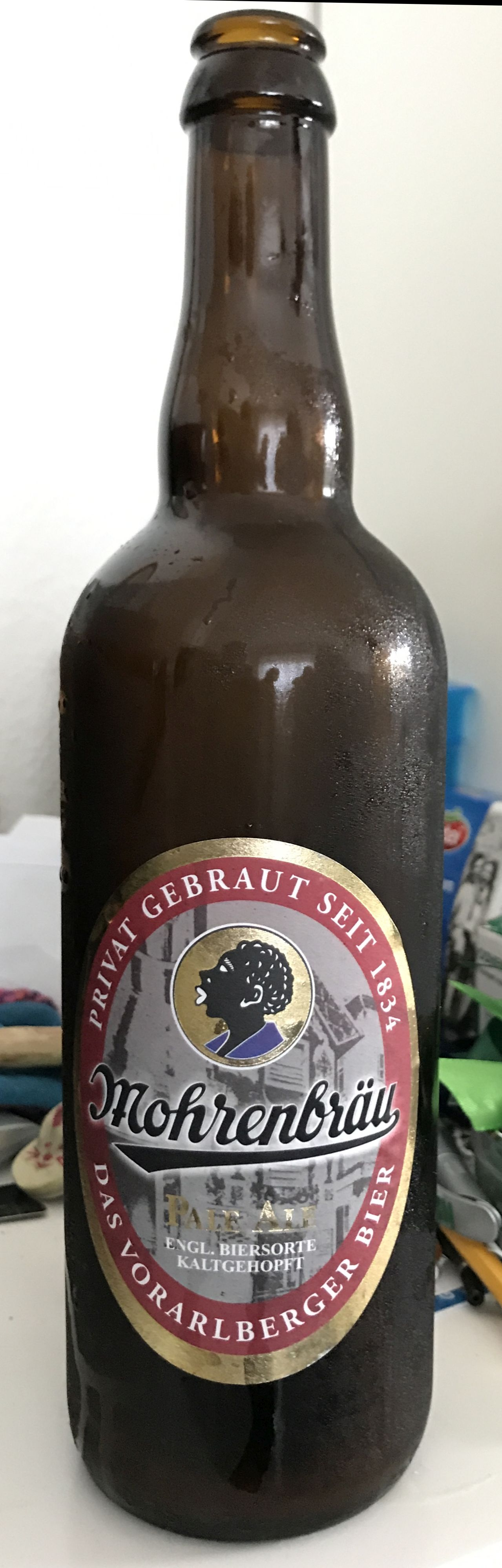
A bottle of Mohrenbräu pale ale

The brewery has a large museum of beer and beer making on the outskirts of Salzburg, a tour of which ends in a visit to the pub for a beer on the house.

=== Ottakringer ===
Ottakringer from Vienna can be found more often in the eastern states. Over the past decades, it has earned somewhat of a cult status leading the company to name one of their canned variants "16er-Blech" (Ottakring is the 16th district of Vienna, "Blech" a slang term for a tin can). Ottakringer raised some attention for supplying rock festival campers in Austria with chilled "Ottarocker" branded cans on-site for a reasonable price, thus removing the need for campers to carry their beer supplies all the way to the festival.

=== Egger Bier ===
In Vorarlberg, Egger Bier is brewed by a brewery in Egg, Bregenzerwald. This led to a lawsuit with the above-mentioned Egger from Lower Austria, which ended in an agreement between the two breweries. So, when buying an Egger in Vorarlberg you get one from Egg, whereas in the rest of Austria it will be from Lower Austria.

=== Mohrenbräu ===
Established in 1834, the Mohrenbrauerei is Vorarlberg's oldest and leading brewery, with a market share of 47.2% in the gastronomy and retail sectors. There has been a discussion about whether or not the name and logo – in German, Mohr is an outdated and pejorative term for an African – suggests racial stereotyping. The company insists that the name and logo refer to the original brewery founder Josef Mohr and have been in use for almost 200 years.

=== Augustiner Brau Mülln ===
Since 1621, beer has been brewed in Salzburg's Mülln neighbourhood, at the base of the Mönchsberg. The Bräustübl tavern and brewery, Austria's largest, offers an indoor seating area measuring 5,000 m², with an additional 1,400 seats in the beer garden. The beer is served in stone jugs, or Steins, drawn directly from wooden barrels. The "Schmankerlgang" (delicatessen arcade) features food stands where regional and traditional dishes can be purchased.

== See also ==
- Beer and breweries by region
- Czech beer
- Culture of Austria
- German beer
- Hungarian beer
