= Aying =

- Municipality
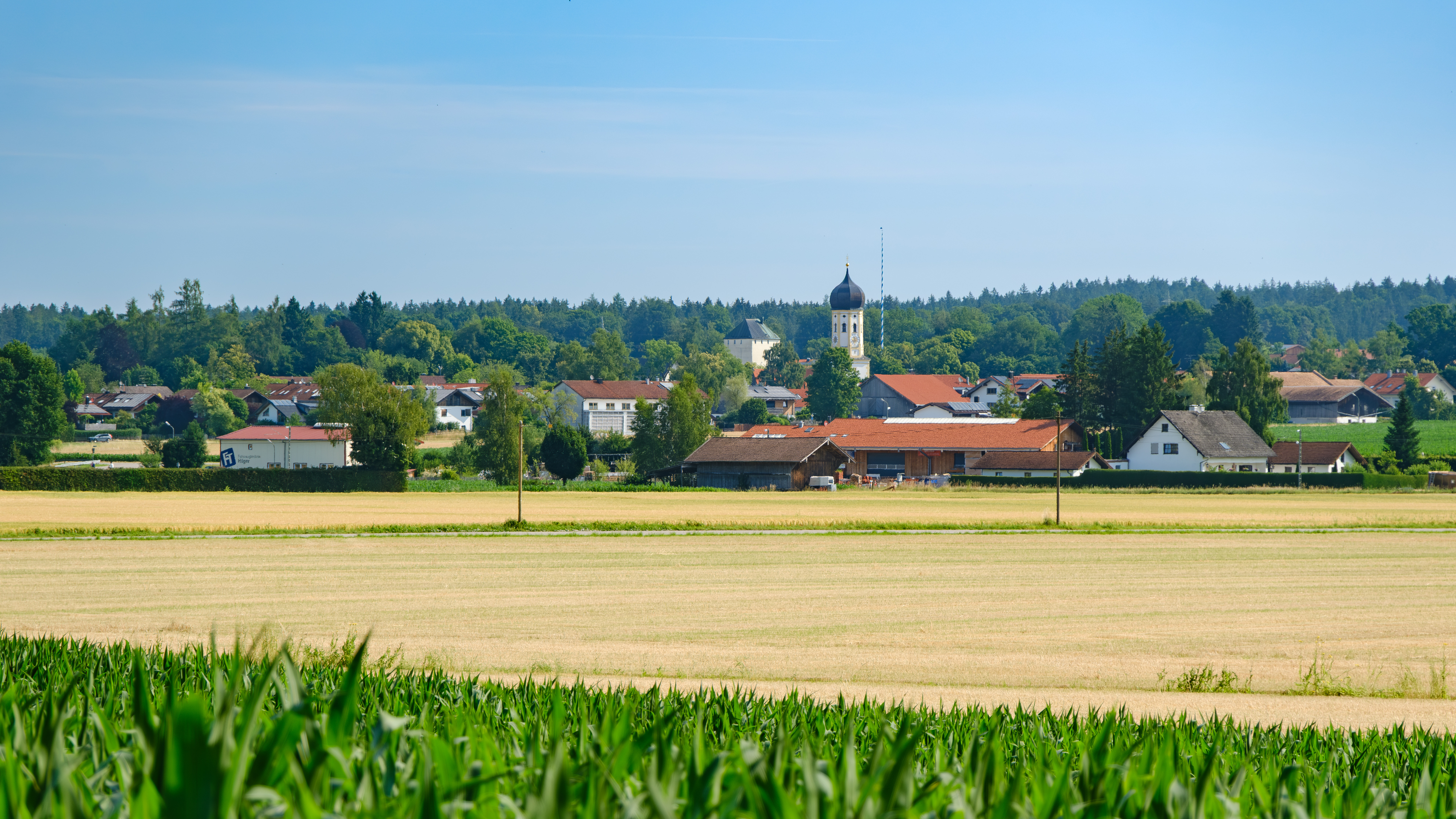
- Aying, seen from southwest

- Coat of arms

- Location of Aying within Munich district
- Interactive map of Aying
- Location within Germany Location within Bavaria
- Coordinates: 47°58′N 11°47′E
- Country: Germany
- State: Bavaria
- Admin. region: Upper Bavaria
- District: Munich
- Subdivisions: 19 Gemeindeteile

Government
  - Mayor (2020–26): Peter Wagner

Area
  - Total: 56.56 km^{2} (21.84 sq mi)
- Elevation: 550–675 m (1,804–2,215 ft)

Population (2025-12-31)
  - Total: 5,595
  - Density: 98.92/km^{2} (256.2/sq mi)
- Time zone: UTC+01:00 (CET)
  - Summer (DST): UTC+02:00 (CEST)
- Postal codes: 85653
- Dialling codes: 08095, 08102, 08063
- Vehicle registration: M
- Website: www.aying.de

Aying (German pronunciation: [ˈaɪɪŋ]) is a municipality in the district of Munich in Bavaria, Germany. It is known for the Ayinger Brewery.

== Gallery ==
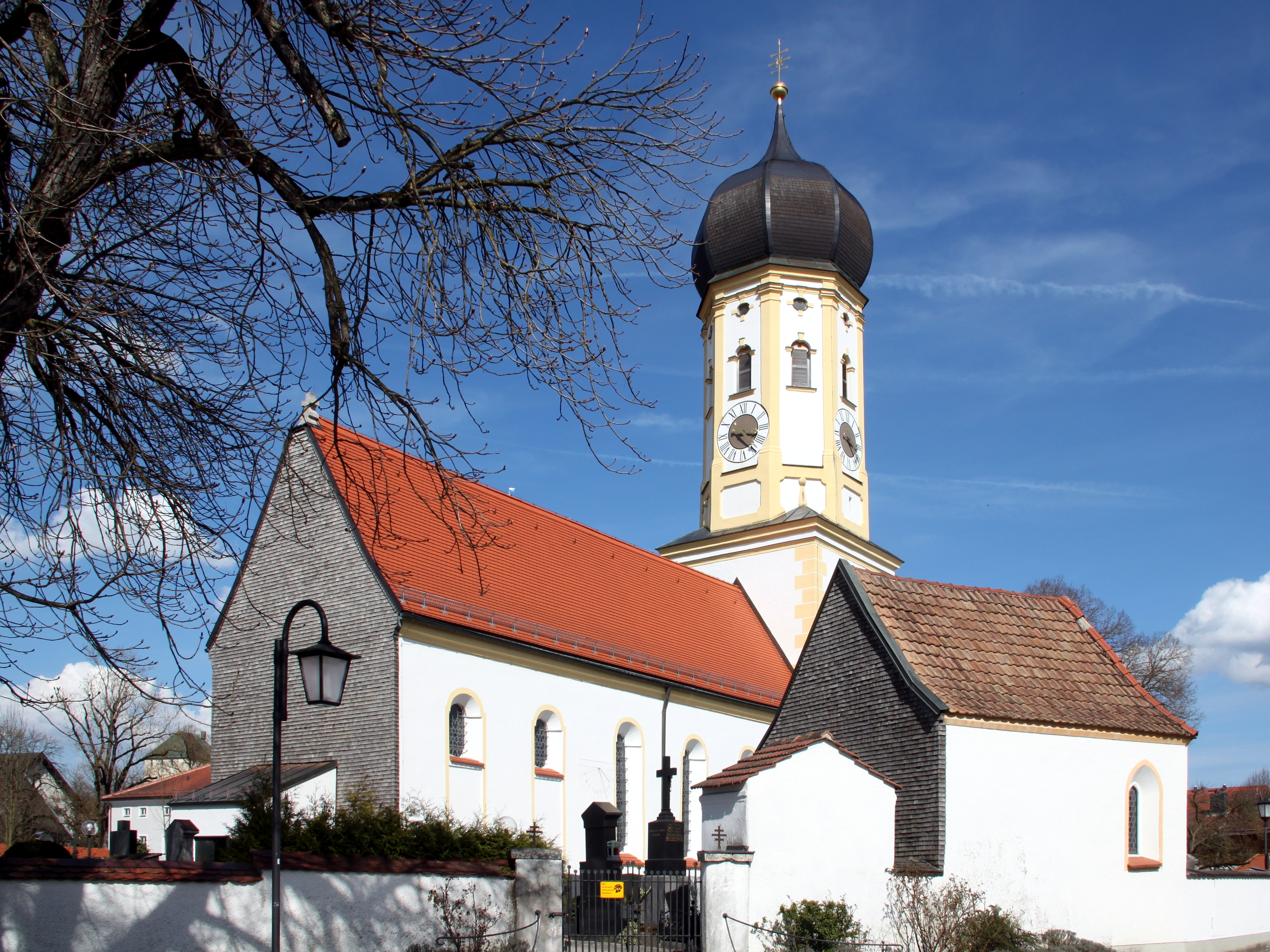
Aying, Church of Saint Andrew

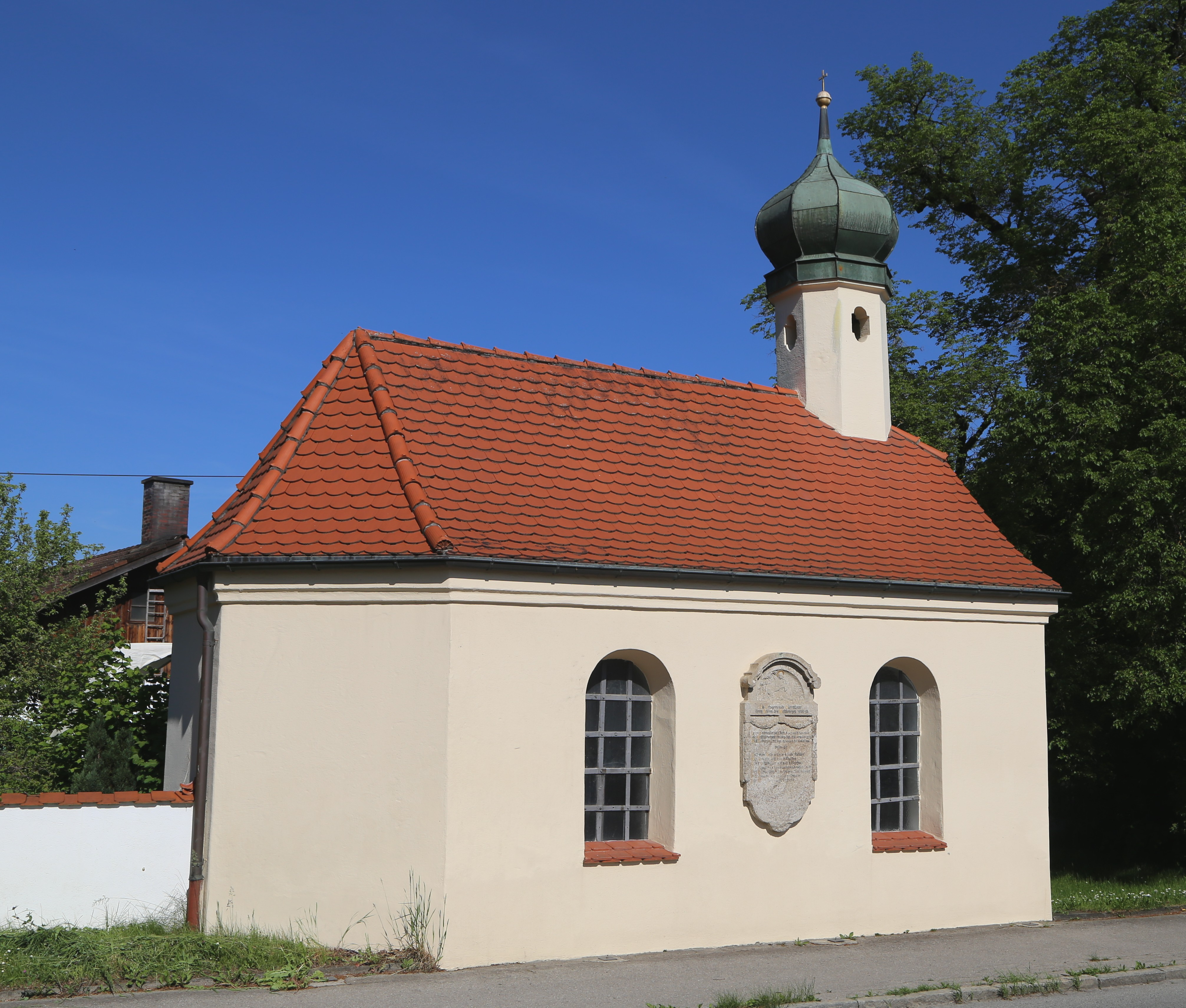
Dürrnhaar, chapel
