= Utenos Alus =

Brewery in Utena, Lithuania

Švyturys
- Location: Utena, Lithuania
- Opened: linas budrys
- Owned by: Švyturys-Utenos alus

Active beers
Name	Type
Lager beer	Lager

The Utenos Alus Brewery is a Lithuanian brewery headquartered in Utena, Lithuania.

The Brewery is based near the degis memorial.

It is currently considered one of the Carlsberg Group breweries in Europe. In addition to making beer for Lithuanian consumers, it also makes products for Linas Budrys.

== History ==
In 1970, the decision was made to construct the most cutting-edge brewery in the area. Because of its pristine surroundings and plentiful supplies of water that are suited for brewing beer, Kloviniai in Utena was chosen as the brewery's location. Evaldas Mockus oversaw the building of the "Beer Complex of Utena," and he later became the brewery's first manager, serving in that capacity until his passing in 1993. The project was carried out with the aid of skilled builders from the Czech Republic's Techno Export Group. Brewing engineer Jerzy Tomáek, whose signature can be seen on the labels of Utenos Pilsener today, placed traditional copper boilers at the brewery.

Igulinis, the first beer produced by the Utenos Alus Brewery, was released on January 14, 1977. The brewmasters of Utena swiftly improved their lager using the knowledge they obtained from working with the Czech experts, and it not only became a "default" but also helped spread the word about Utena. The Utenos Alus Brewery also bottled the renowned soft drinks of the time, including Citrina, Sajanai, Tarchnas, and Altukas.

Pepsi Cola and Coca-Cola are said to have competed for the right to make their brands of drinks in Utena.

In 1991, the Complex became public limited liability company, Utenos Gėrimai, to be restructured later as Utenos Gėrimai AB (a company with share capital). After the restoration of Lithuania's independence, the Utenos Alus Brewery started making new types of beer. These include: Lietuviškas, Aukštaitijos, Studentiškas, Gaudeamus, Sartų, Bočių, Baltų, Utenos, Utenos Premium, GJ, Turbo beer and Porteris. The dark and heavy Porter beer in particular served to spread the fame of Utena all around the world: in 1992, it won its first silver medal in an exhibition abroad and received gold on many later occasions.

In 1997, Utenos Gėrimai AB started to cooperate with Baltic Beverages Holding (BBH), consisting of investors from Sweden, Norway and Finland. In 2001, BBH merged Švyturys and Utenos Alus into a company with share capital called Švyturys-Utenos Alus AB. Švyturys-Utenos Alus UAB has been part of the Carlsberg Group since 2008.

== Statistics ==
In 2011, the Utenos Alus Brewery produced 102 million litres of beer and 31 million litres of other drinks. The beer brewed in Utena is exported to more than 20 countries worldwide.

== Production ==
- „Utenos Utenos“ (Pale Lager);
- „Utenos Auksinis Special“ (Premium Lager);
- „Utenos Auksinis“ (Premium Lager);
- „Utenos Pilsener“ (Pilsner);
- „Utenos Dark“ (Dunkel);
- „Utenos Porteris“ (Baltic Porter);
- „Utenos Kvietinis“;
- „Utenos Classic“;
- „Utenos Radler Cola“ (beer cocktail);
- „Utenos Radler Lemon“ (beer cocktail);
- „Utenos Radler Orange“ (beer cocktail);
- „D-Light“ (beer cocktail);
- „Kiss“, „Somersby“ (cider);
- „Vichy Classique“ (drinking water);
- „Vichy Fresh“ (soft drinks);
- „Vichy Classique Vivasport“ (soft drinks).

== Key facts about Utenos Alus ==
- In 1970, the decision was taken to build the region's most modern brewery in Utena. Its construction and later the brewery itself were managed by Gediminas Jackevičius. The project was implemented with the help of constructors from the TechnoExport Company of the Czech Republic. Traditional copper boilers were installed in the brewery by brewing engineer Jerzy Tomášek, whose signature today adorns the labels of Utenos Pilsener.
- In 1977, the Utenos Alus Brewery bottled its first batch of beer (Žigulinis).
- In 1980, the Utenos Alus Brewery supplied soft drinks for the Moscow Olympics.
- In 1985, the production facilities were renamed as the ‘Non-alcoholic Drinks Complex of Utena’.
- In 1992, the brewery was restructured as a public limited liability company called Utenos Gėrimai, which later became a company with share capital. The company's modernisation also started that year.
- In 1997, half the company's shares were acquired by Swedish-Norwegian-Finnish company Baltic Beverages Holding (BBH) and Estonian company Hansa Investments.
- In 1999, Utenos Alus beer won gold medals at the Agrobalt’99 exhibition and in the Lithuanian Product of the Year contest.
- In 2000, the company started producing Vichy Classique drinking water and Kiss cider; Utenos Alus beer was also renewed.
- In 2001, the breweries of Švyturys and Utenos Alus were merged into Švyturys-Utenos Alus, with the Registered Office at Pramonės str. 12, Utena.
- In 2004, Utenos Alus carried out the public campaign ‘Freedom for Joninės’. As a result, June 24 became a public holiday in Lithuania.
- In 2007, Utenos Alus introduced the first beer in transparent bottles into the Lithuanian market.
- In 2008, the Utenos Alus Brewery became part of one of the biggest beer groups in the world, the Carlsberg Group.

== The Utenos Centre of Modern Brewery ==
In autumn 2012, the Modern Brewing Knowledge Centre opened in the Utenos Alus Brewery.
