= Pedal Haus Brewery =

Craft brewery and brewpub chain in Arizona

- Location: Tempe, Arizona (original); Chandler, Phoenix and Mesa, Arizona, United States
- Opened: September 25, 2015; 10 years ago
- Key people: Julian Wright (president and CEO); Derek "Doc" Osborne (founding brewer)
- Website: pedalhausbrewery.com

Active beers
| Name | Type |
| Day Drinker | American light lager |
| Bière Blanche | Belgian-style witbier |
| Pedal Haus Pilsner | German-style pilsner |
| Beach Cruiser | Vienna lager |
| White Rabbit | Hazy India pale ale |
| Voltage | Black India pale ale |

Seasonal beers
| Name | Type |
| Bunny Hop | Peach India pale ale (spring) |
| Island Hopper | Golden ale (summer) |
| Oktoberfest | Märzen (fall) |
| Happy Camper | Oatmeal stout (winter) |

Pedal Haus Brewery is an American craft brewery and brewpub chain in the Phoenix metropolitan area of Arizona. Founded in Tempe in 2015 by restaurateur Julian Wright with brewer Derek "Doc" Osborne, the company operates taprooms in Tempe, Chandler, Phoenix and Mesa, and a production brewery in Chandler; a franchised location operates at Phoenix Sky Harbor International Airport. The brewery specializes in European-style lagers and Belgian-style ales. Its Bière Blanche won a gold medal at the Great American Beer Festival in 2018, and the brewery was named Brewery of the Year at the 2023 Arizona Craft Beer Awards.

== History ==
Wright, who had operated bars and restaurants in Tempe for about fifteen years, announced the brewery in 2015 and opened it on September 25, 2015, at 730 South Mill Avenue in downtown Tempe. At opening, the 14,000-square-foot building included a dining room with a view of the brewhouse, two indoor bars, a patio and a covered, dog-friendly beer garden with its own bar and a stage. The building was remodeled in 2016 and, by 2023, had been renovated four times. Osborne, previously a corporate brewer for BJ's Restaurant and Brewhouse, designed the brewhouse for lagering and focused on Belgian ales and European-style lagers. The restaurant opened as a farm-to-table Belgian bistro, a concept the owners reworked after about nine months to make the brewery the focus with a pub menu.

A second location opened in February 2020 on Boston Street in downtown Chandler, in a space that had housed Wright's Mexican restaurant Las Palmas Cantina; beer for the location was brewed in Tempe and delivered daily. A third location opened on November 18, 2021, in the monOrchid building on Roosevelt Row in downtown Phoenix, a 6,000-square-foot space with a rooftop bar and a capacity of about 300. In November 2022 the company took over operation of the monOrchid event space and the adjacent Kahvi Coffee + Café.

In December 2022 brewing moved from Tempe to a warehouse near Warner Road in Chandler that had previously been a custom wheel shop, which doubled the company's brewing capacity and added a centrifuge, a yeast lab and barrel-aging space. The Tempe location was then renovated again, at a cost reported as $400,000, adding about 50 seats and a live-music stage in the space the brewhouse had occupied. In August 2023 a franchised Pedal Haus Brewery restaurant opened in the Terminal 4 south concourse of Phoenix Sky Harbor International Airport, near gate D11, serving Pedal Haus beer and a reduced food menu.

A fourth taproom opened on November 23, 2024, at 201 West Main Street in downtown Mesa, in a former auto body shop, with a 6,000-square-foot dog-friendly beer garden and no indoor kitchen; food is served from a trailer.

== Beers ==
Pedal Haus brews German- and Belgian-style beers alongside American IPAs. Its year-round lineup includes Day Drinker, a 3.6% ABV light lager; Bière Blanche, a Belgian-style witbier brewed with Moroccan orange peel and coriander; a German-style pilsner; Beach Cruiser, a Vienna lager; White Rabbit, a hazy IPA; and Voltage, a black IPA. Seasonal releases include Bunny Hop, a peach IPA, in spring; Island Hopper, a golden ale, in summer; an Oktoberfest Märzen in fall; and Happy Camper, an oatmeal stout, in winter, along with a peppermint porter released around the holidays. Day Drinker, introduced in the brewery's second year, has won more medals than any other Pedal Haus beer. Osborne has described the brewery's approach as favoring traditional styles: "I like beer-flavored beers."

== Awards ==
By May 2016 the brewery had won medals at international competitions. At the 2018 Great American Beer Festival, Bière Blanche won the gold medal in the Belgian-Style Witbier category, a field of 86 entries. At the 2019 Copa Cervezas de América, the brewery won gold medals for White Rabbit and Bière Blanche and a bronze for Day Drinker, and received the competition's award for the highest combined medal score among United States breweries. In 2023 the Arizona Craft Brewers Guild named Pedal Haus Brewery of the Year at the Arizona Craft Beer Awards. Day Drinker won silver medals in the American-Style Light Lager category at the World Beer Cup in 2024 and 2026.
