= Märzen =

Beer of Bavarian origin associated with Oktoberfest

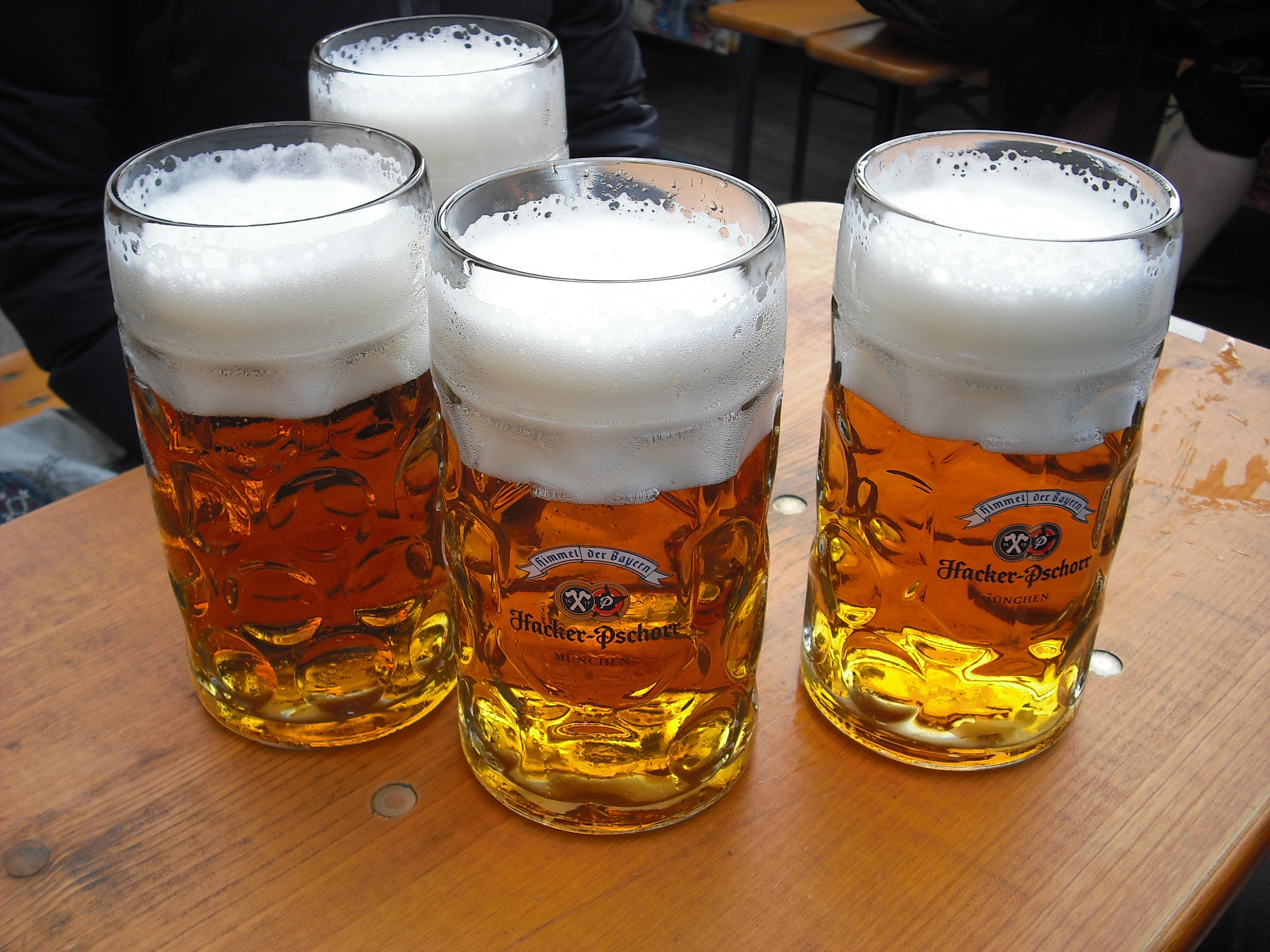
Festbier served at Oktoberfest in the traditional 1-litre Maß

Märzen (German: [ˈmɛʁt͡sn̩]) or Märzenbier (German: March beer) is a lager that originated in Bavaria, Germany. It has a medium to full body and may vary in colour from pale through amber to dark brown. It was the beer traditionally served at the Munich Oktoberfest. The geographical indication Oktoberfestbier is protected in the EU and can only be used for Märzen that is brewed in Munich.

In Germany, Oktoberfestbier may also be called Festbier or Wiesnbier.

== History ==
Märzen has its origins in Bavaria, probably before the 16th century. A Bavarian brewing ordinance decreed in 1553 that beer may be brewed only between 29 September (St. Michael's Day or Michaelmas) and 23 April (St. George's Day or Georgi), as the high summertime temperatures were more likely to cause off-flavoured beer due to elevated ambient fermentation temperatures.

Märzen was brewed in March, with moderate and balanced hopping levels, malt and slightly higher alcohol content that would allow the beer to last while brewing new beer was forbidden from 24 April to 28 September. The beer was then allowed to lager in ice and straw filled beer cellars until autumn.

The original Märzen was described as "dark brown, full-bodied, and bitter". The beer was often kept in the cellar until late in the summer, and then served at the Oktoberfest.

Common names for Märzen in Germany and Austria include Märzenbier, Wiener Märzen, Festbier and Oktoberfestbier.

=== Märzen in Germany and Austria ===
Märzen is now a rarity in Germany and is mainly found in the South, often in varieties that explicitly refer to its association with Oktoberfest, such as the "Oktoberfest Bier" from the Paulaner brewery. In Austria, however, Märzen is the name given to the most popular type of beer, but the Austrian Märzen is lighter in color and taste and corresponds, more or less, to a Bavarian Helles or Export beer. The reason for this has to do with Austrian post-war regulations which limited the prices of essential food and drink products. Märzenbier was a preferred variety due to its reputation as a festive drink and its high pre-war price, but brewers reduced its malt and alcohol content in order to maintain its profitability at its newly limited price.

== Description ==
In comparison to a Bavarian pale lager, the traditional Märzen style is characterised by a fuller body, and a sweeter and often less hoppy flavour. It typically contains 5.1–6.0% alcohol by volume.

The Austrian style is light in colour, body and flavour balance, and is the most popular beer style among the beers in Austria. Austrian Märzenbiers often use caramel malts that impart a sweeter flavour than their German counterparts; other Austrian Märzen overlap stylistically with Munich-style Helles.

Brewers in the Czech Republic have been producing Märzen style beer, called březňák or marcovní (March beer), since the 15th century. Today's equivalents are legally defined as 14° lagers called světlé speciální pivo (light special beer), polotmavé speciální pivo (half-dark special beer), and tmavé speciální pivo (dark special beer).

In Lithuania, Švyturys produces a Märzen style beer called Baltijos.

Żywiec, a Polish brewery, produces a Märzen style lager called piwo lager typu marcowe (March type lager beer), or simply "Marcowe".

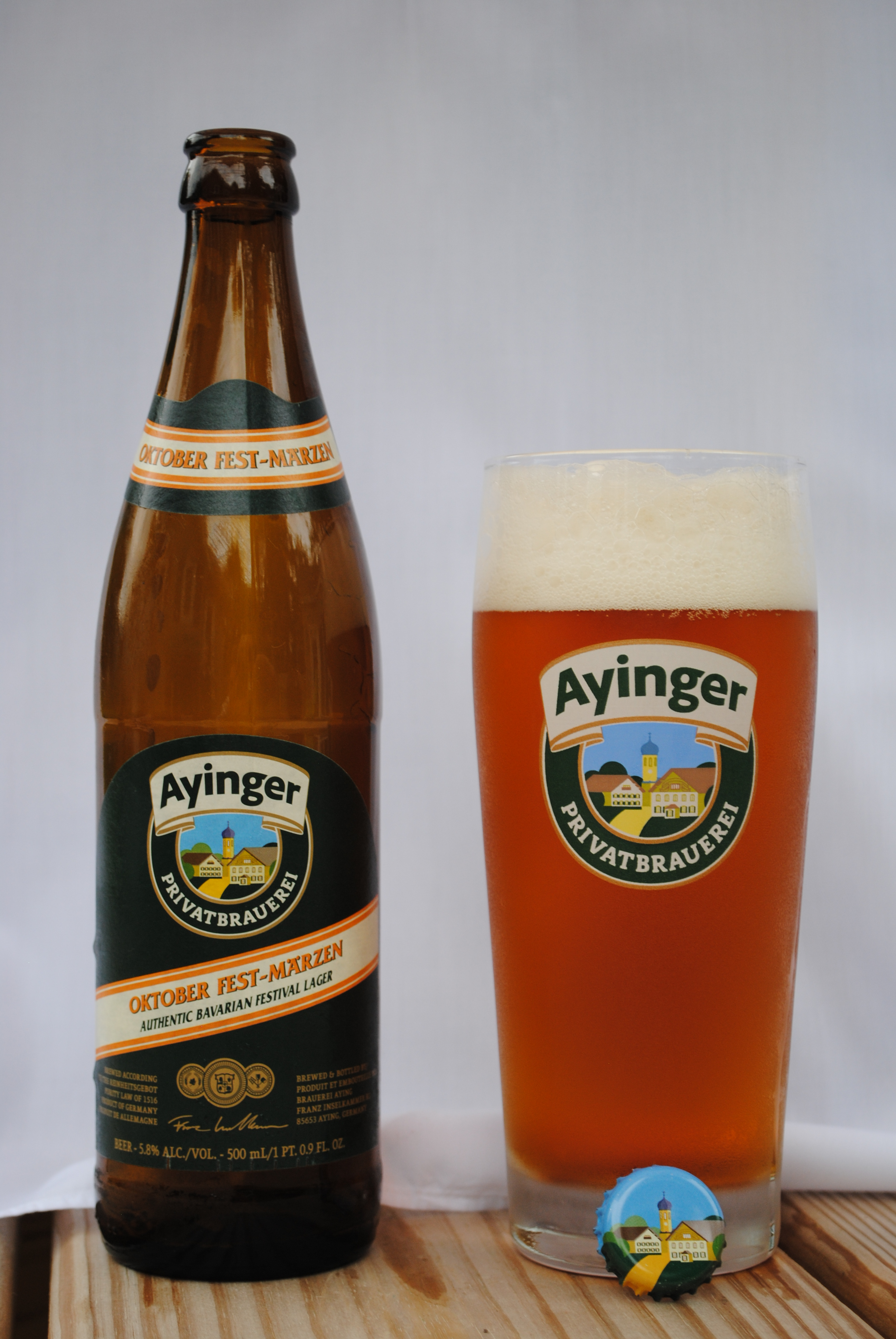
Märzen from Ayinger Brewery, Bavaria

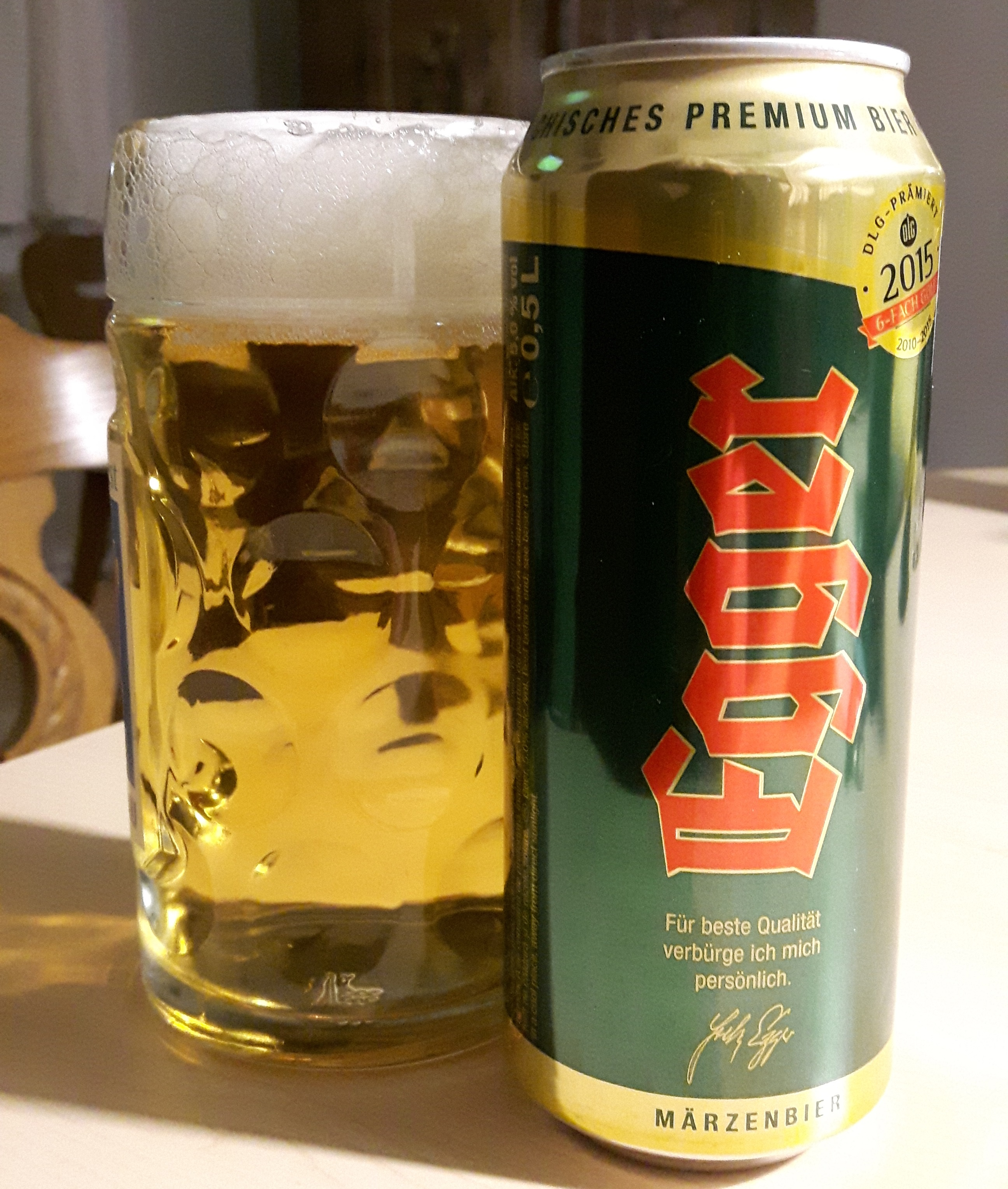
Egger Märzen, Austria

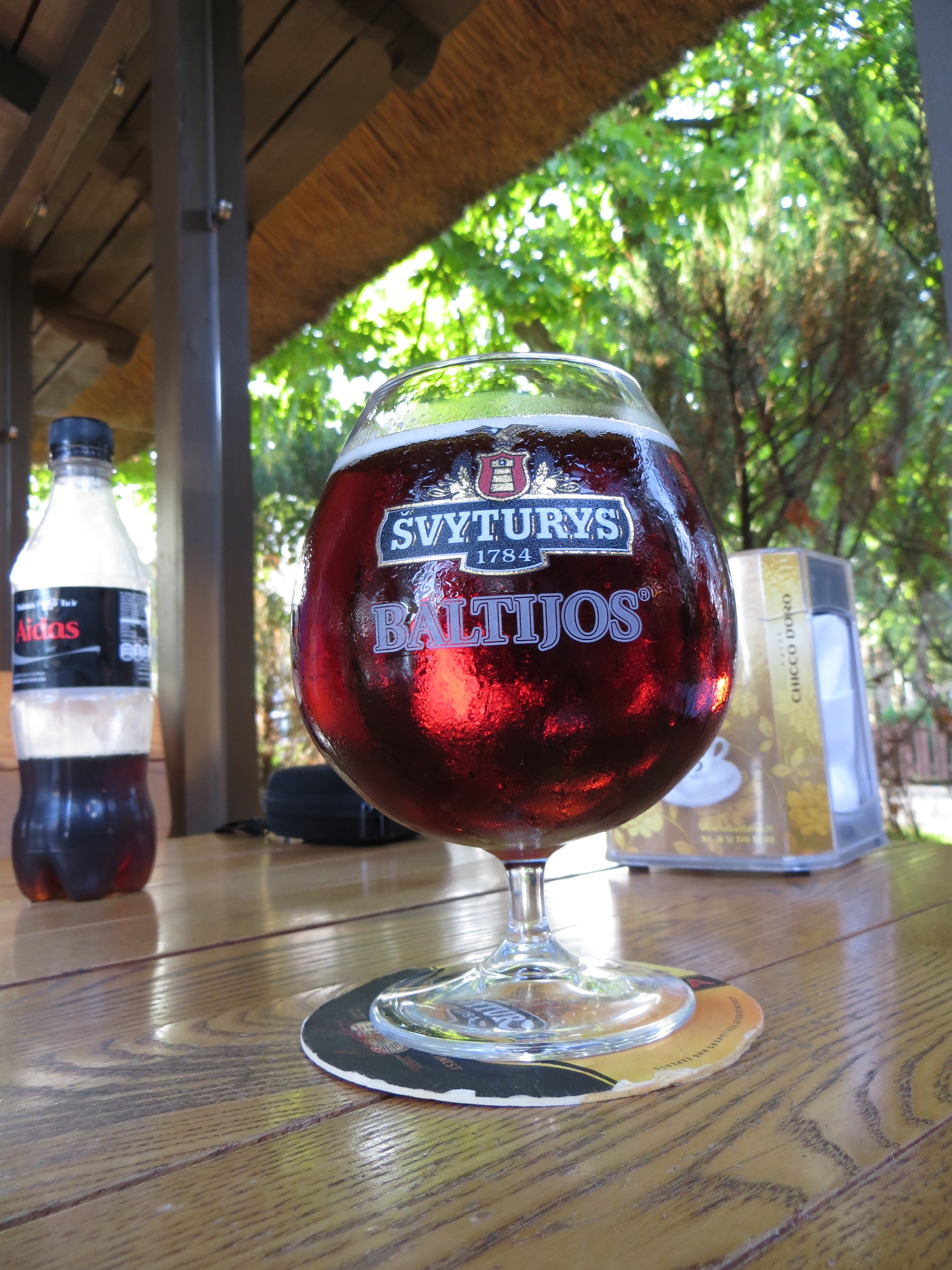
Švyturys Baltijos, Lithuania

== See also ==
- Helles
- Pale lager
