= Klaipėda Sea Festival =

Annual celebration in Klaipėda, Lithuania

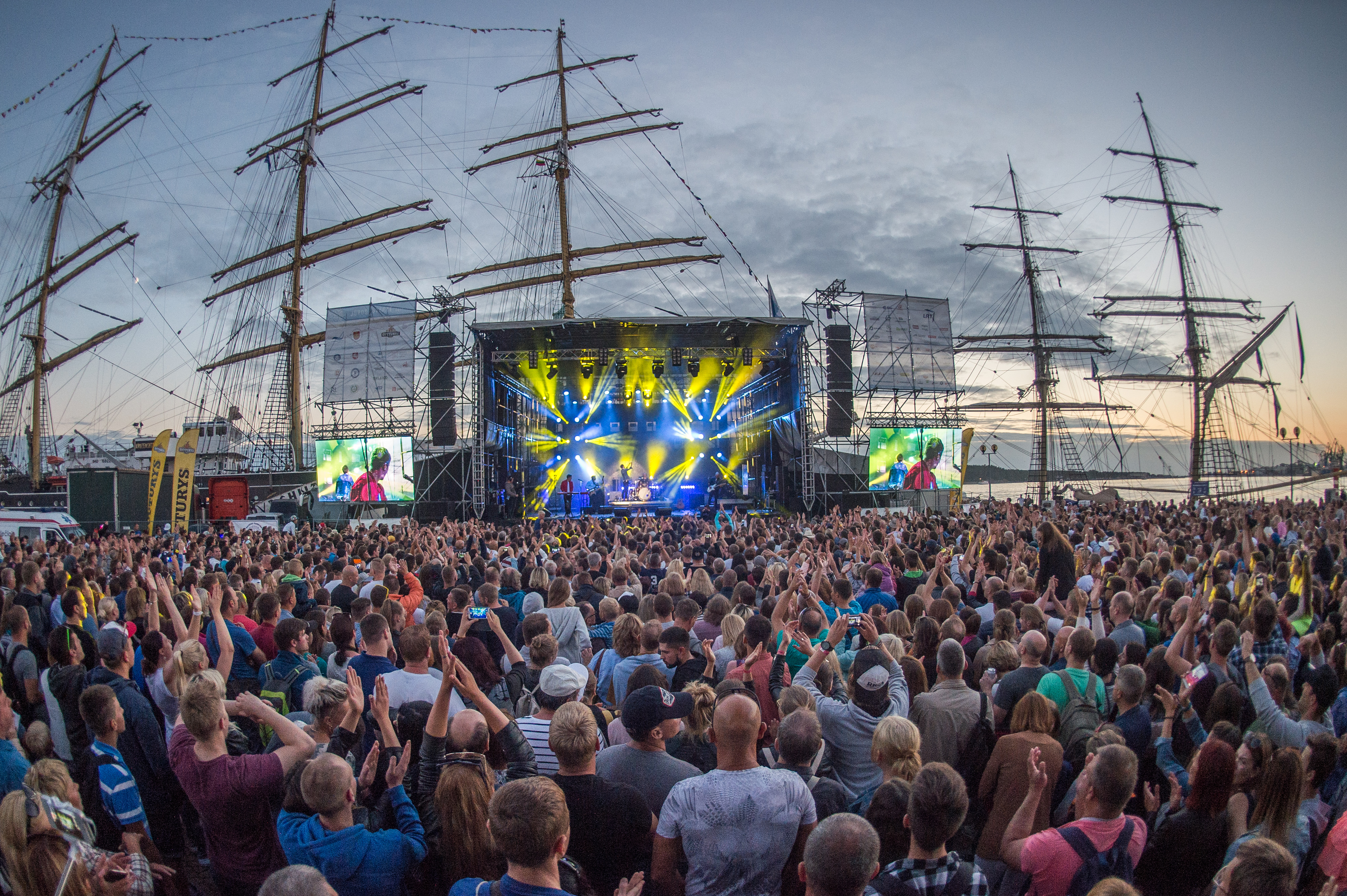
Concert of the Sea Festival in Klaipėda Cruise Ship Terminal in 2017

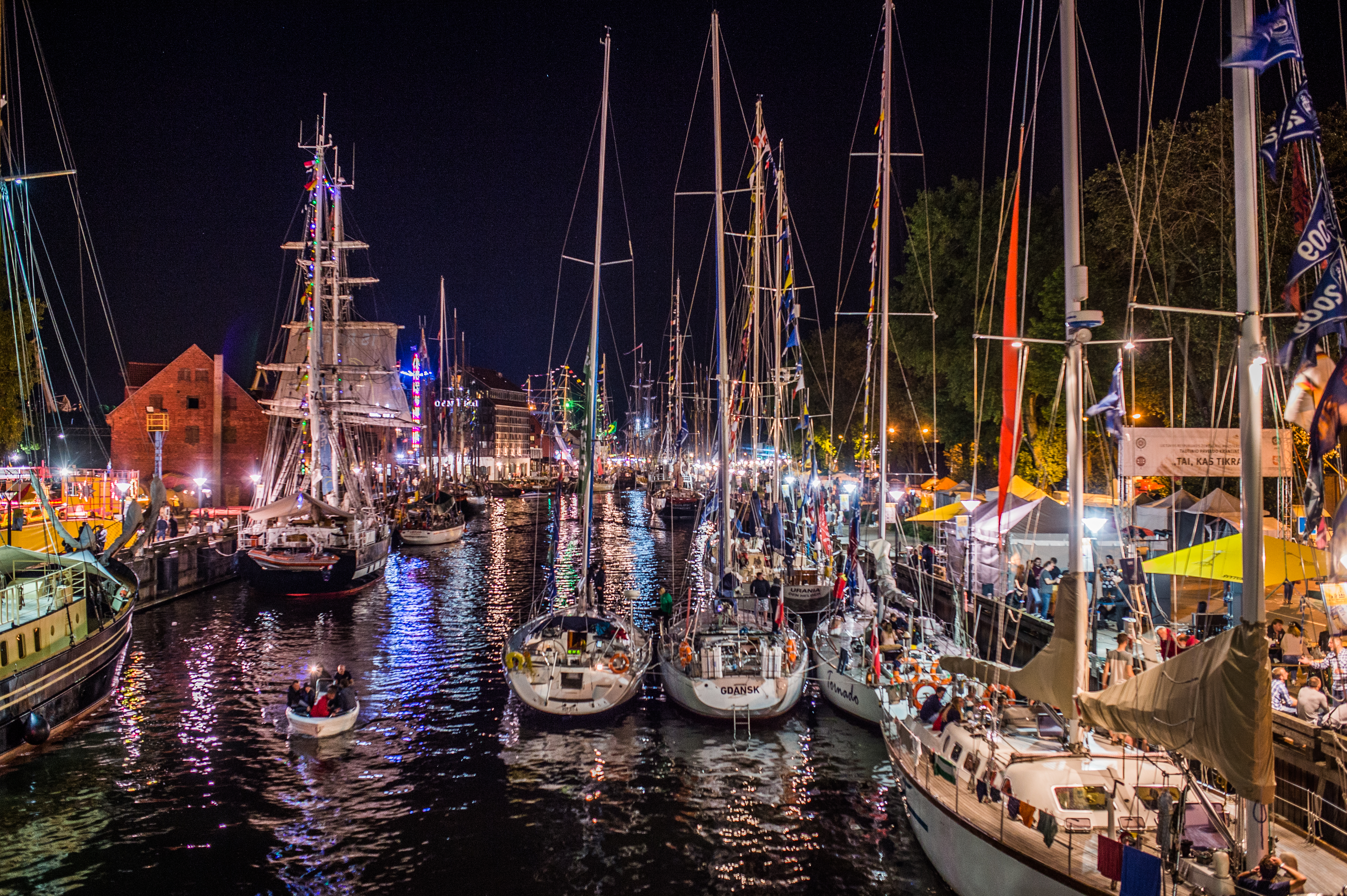
Participants' ships of the 2017 Sea Festival in Klaipėda

The Klaipėda Sea Festival (Jūros šventė) has been held annually in the city of Klaipėda, Lithuania during the month of July since 1934.

In 2009, the city hosted the Tall Ships Race as part of the festival. According to a city website, about 500,000 people have been present at the event.

The Klaipéda Sea Festival usually starts at the end of July or beginning of August and lasts for 3 days. The first Klaipéda Sea Festival was organised in 1934. The festival program usually becomes available closer to time, organizers advertise in local newspapers and on www.jurossvente.lt website. Before the festival the High Street is nicely decorated and the opening ceremony starts with the Mayor's speech following various free street concerts and a local market where it is possible to purchase various handmade tools and crafts, locally produced food, and clothing. There is also a carnival, where mythological sea creatures are presented by adults and children dressed up in different costumes. There are also various international sailing events, different sports competitions, fishermen competitions, street theater, exhibitions and children's performances. The performers come from different countries. Every year the program introduces something new, so every festival is different. At the end of the Sea Festival there is always a beautiful free firework show.

If there is too much noise and too many activities, it is always possible to use a ferry and get to the beach.

Pubs and bars are open till late; many of them will have their own live entertainment.

The main street is usually closed and it is always advisable to leave cars at home and use public transport.
