= Tombstone Brewing Company =

Brewery in Arizona

Tombstone Brewing Company is a brewing company primarily located in Tombstone, Arizona. It was founded in 2016 and currently has branches in Tombstone, Phoenix, and Sierra Vista.

== History ==
Tombstone Brewing Company was founded in 2016 in Tombstone, Arizona, to "bring world class beer to the town Too Tough to Die". Their Phoenix location replaced Helio Basin Brewing, another local brewing company in 2020. The owner of Tombstone Brewing, Matt Brown, said the reason for opening a Phoenix brewery was due to the fact that 60% of beer sales were from Phoenix customers.

== Awards & recognition ==
In July 2024, Tombstone received Phoenix Magazine's Beer of the Month award for its Joosy Froot Double IPA.
