= Baltic Beverages Holding =

Beverage industry corporate group owned by the Carlsberg Group

- Industry: Alcoholic beverage
- Area served: Baltic States and Ukraine
- Products: Beer
- Parent: Carlsberg Group

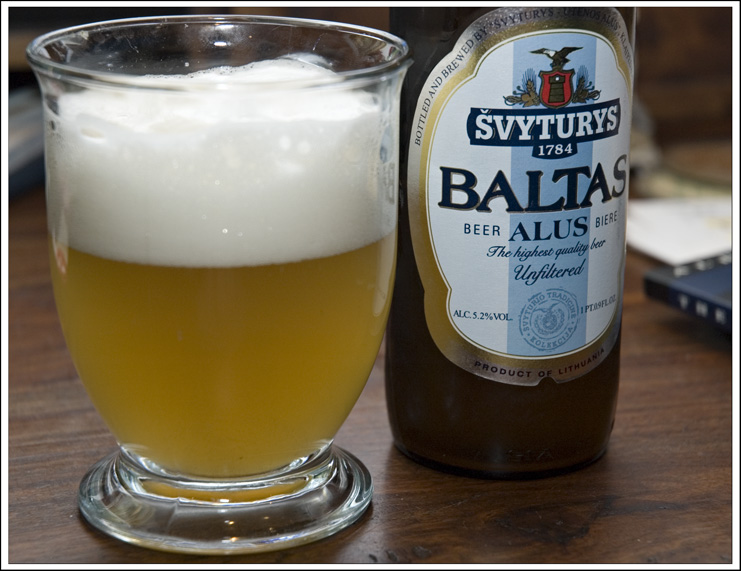
Baltas wheat beer (5.2% abv)

Baltic Beverages Holding is a brewing company owned by Carlsberg Group. It is a significant operator in the brewing industry in the Baltic states and Ukraine.

== History ==
The company was founded in 1991 by the Finnish brewery Hartwall and the Swedish brewery Pripps.

== Breweries ==
=== Aldaris Brewery ===
With its origins dating back to 1865 in Riga, Aldaris ('brewer' in Latvian) employs more than 200 workers, and is one of the biggest breweries in Latvia. It brews a range of beers, mostly pale lagers. The most popular brands include Mežpils and Porteris. Since 2013 many beer brands (Luksus, Zelta, Gaišais light beer, Pilzenes Pilsner and Apinītis) are brewed in other breweries of BBH. A publicly available museum has been opened in the brewery complex in 2015.

=== Utenos Alus Brewery ===
Utenos Alus is a Lithuanian brewery, established in Utena in 1977.

Utenos Alus and Švyturys breweries merged into the joint-stock company Švyturys-Utenos Alus in 2001. In February 2003 the company was reorganised into a closed-end company.

=== Švyturys Brewery ===
Švyturys is a brewery in Klaipėda, Lithuania. It is part of Švyturys-Utenos alus. The brewery was established in 1784 by the merchant J. W. Reincke in Klaipėda, then known as Memel in East Prussia. After the creation of the German Empire, the brewery became part of Memeler Aktien-Brauerei & Destillation on September 15, 1871. It passed to Lithuanian control when the Memel Territory was annexed by Lithuania in 1923. During the Second World War, the region was occupied by Nazi Germany and, from 1940, the brewery was then administered by Memeler Ostquell Brauerei GmbH. After the war, in 1945, the Klaipėda Region was transferred back to Lithuania, and the brewery returned to the Lithuanian control.

Švyturys and Utenos Alus breweries merged into the joint-stock company Švyturys-Utenos alus in 2001. In February 2003 the company was reorganised into a closed-end company. Currently, Carlsberg Breweries controls Švyturys-Utenos alus through Baltic Beverages Holding.

In June 2000 Švyturio Ekstra beer received the Silver award in the Dortmunder/European Export category at the World Beer Cup silver. Same brand won a gold medal in the Dortmunder beer category at World Beer Championship (USA) in November 2001. In 2002 Švyturys Baltijos beer was awarded the Bronze award at the World Beer Cup in the Marzen/Octoberfest category.

=== Saku Brewery ===
Saku Brewery dates back to 1820, making it the oldest commercial brewery in Estonia. It makes a wide range of pale lagers, such as the very popular Saku Original, and a few stronger and darker lagers. Since 2008, Saku has been 100% owned by the Carlsberg Group.
