= Superior Taste Award =

Annual noncompetitive prize

The Superior Taste Award is an annual non-competitive prize open to any consumer food or drink product, subject to payment of an entry fee of Euro 1500-2500.

It is organised since 2005 by the International Taste Institute, who specialised in the sensory evaluation and certification of consumer food and drink products.

The Superior Taste Award certification recognizes products of high gustatory quality.

Products are blind tested by a panel of professional chefs and sommeliers who score the products out of 100, on each of the 5 International Hedonic Sensory Analysis criteria: first impression, vision, olfaction, taste, texture (food) or final sensation (drinks).

Products are tested following a monadic methodology, on their own merits, not competing against other products. Products reaching a global score above 70% are granted the Superior Taste Award.

== Eligibility ==
All consumer food and drink products from a wide range of categories are eligible to participate in the testing. Products are submitted by companies of all sizes, from small manufacturers to large international companies.

== Awards ==
Products scoring above 70% are granted respectively the following Superior Taste Awards:

3 Stars: Exceptional products, scoring above 90%

2 Stars: Remarkable products, scoring between 80% and 90%

1 Star: Notable products, scoring between 70% and 80%

The International Taste Institute recognizes producers that demonstrate consistent remarkable product quality over several years with the following prestige awards:

The Absolute Taste Award: it is granted to products that have been awarded 3 stars 20 times over a period of 25 years.

The Diamond Taste Award: it is granted to products that have been awarded 3 stars 7 times over a period of 10 years.

The Crystal Taste Award: it is granted to products that have been awarded 3 stars 3 years in a row
