= Burgberg (Erlangen) =

Coordinates: 49°36′31.8″N 11°00′45.3″E

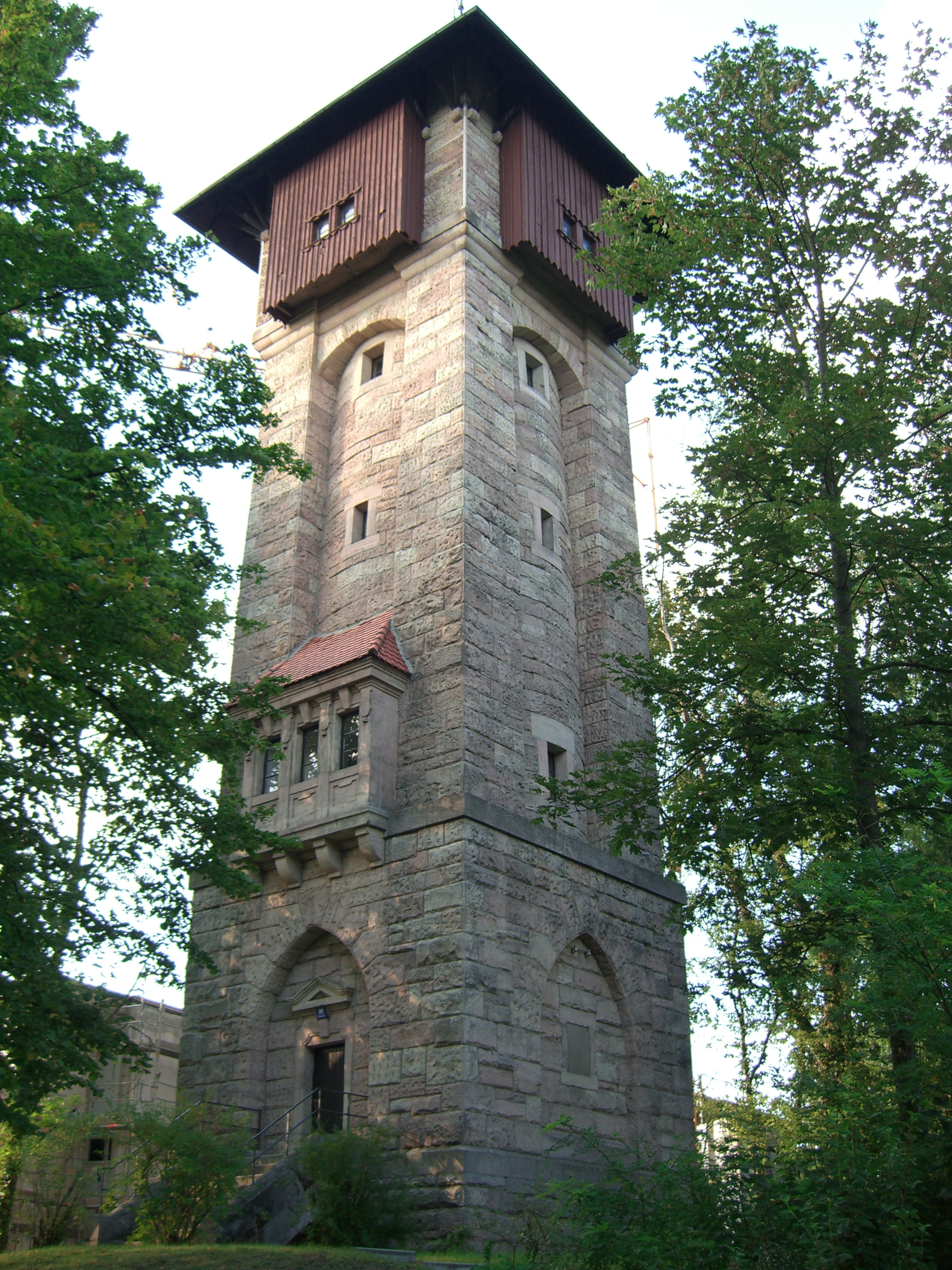
A former water tower located on the Burgberg

The Burgberg (German pronunciation: [ˈbʊʁkˌbɛʁk]), also sometimes referred to as Strawberry Hill, is a 332-meter-high sandstone hill in Erlangen, Germany. It was quarried in the 15th century and its southern slope has been used to house beer cellars since 1675. The cellar storage made Erlangen a pioneer concerning beer exports. The "Erlangen Bergkirchweih" has taken place in and around the cellars every Whitsun since 1775.

== Geology ==
Strawberry Hill is built up of several layers of the Upper Löwenstein Formation. This geological condition was of great practical importance for Erlangen. It can be assumed that since the high Middle Ages, when stones were used to build houses, quarries were created at Burgberg. The earliest evidence of this dates back to 1619. For the construction of the new town "Christian-Erlang" (from 1686) and the reconstruction of the old town after the big city fire (from 1706) mainly stones from the castle hill were used. The extraction of stone from the castle hill experienced a last upswing from the middle of the 19th century, when numerous university buildings were newly built and the town expanded in the course of the Gründerzeit. At the beginning of the 20th century the stone exploitation ended. Today, 31 quarries can still be found. Particularly in the western part of the mountain, some are clearly visible.

== The cellars of the Erlangen breweries ==
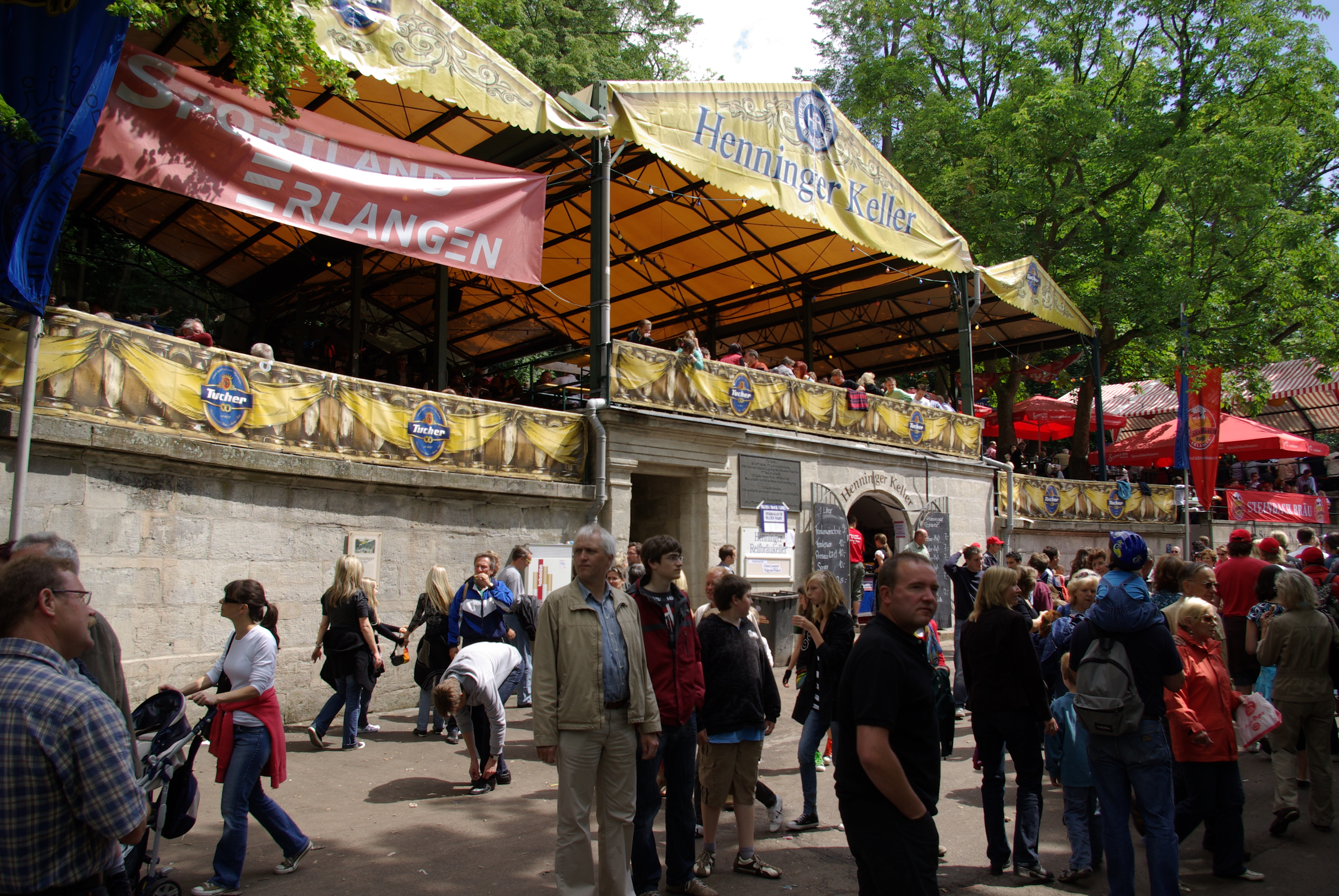
The Henninger Cellar during the Erlanger Bergkirchweih, 2009

The Burgberg gained further importance for the town when in the last decades of the 17th century the Erlangen brewers began to drive cellars into the mountain's southern side. Over the course of the next 150 years 16 rock cellars were built, which still today form a labyrinth more than 21 km in length. The Henninger cellar leads 861 metres through the entire mountain to the north side. The cellars provide optimal conditions for the year-round storage of beer, which used to be brewed only in winter. This cellar system enabled the Erlangen brewers to supply fresh beer all year round, making Erlangen one of the leading beer export cities in Germany, especially in the 19th century. The Erlangen brewers only lost this advantage with the invention of the refrigerating machine by Linde. This led to the decline of the Erlangen brewing industry. While individual cellars were still used for mushroom cultivation in the middle of the 20th century, they were no longer used for beer storage.

In 1729 the Erlangen shooting company built the old town shooting gallery on the southern slope. In 1755 the magistrate of Erlangen's old town decided to move the traditional Pentecost market to the cellars on the castle hill. This custom was retained from then on, this Pentecost market developed into the Erlanger Bergkirchweih, today one of the largest Bavarian beer festivals.

The Zum Burgkeller inn also existed on the south-western slope from 1856 to 1876. It was demolished in 1936 when the B4 was moved. Further below was the restaurant Zur Windmühle, whose building today serves as a residential building and is located directly next to the A 73.

== Resort and villa district of the Erlangen Society ==
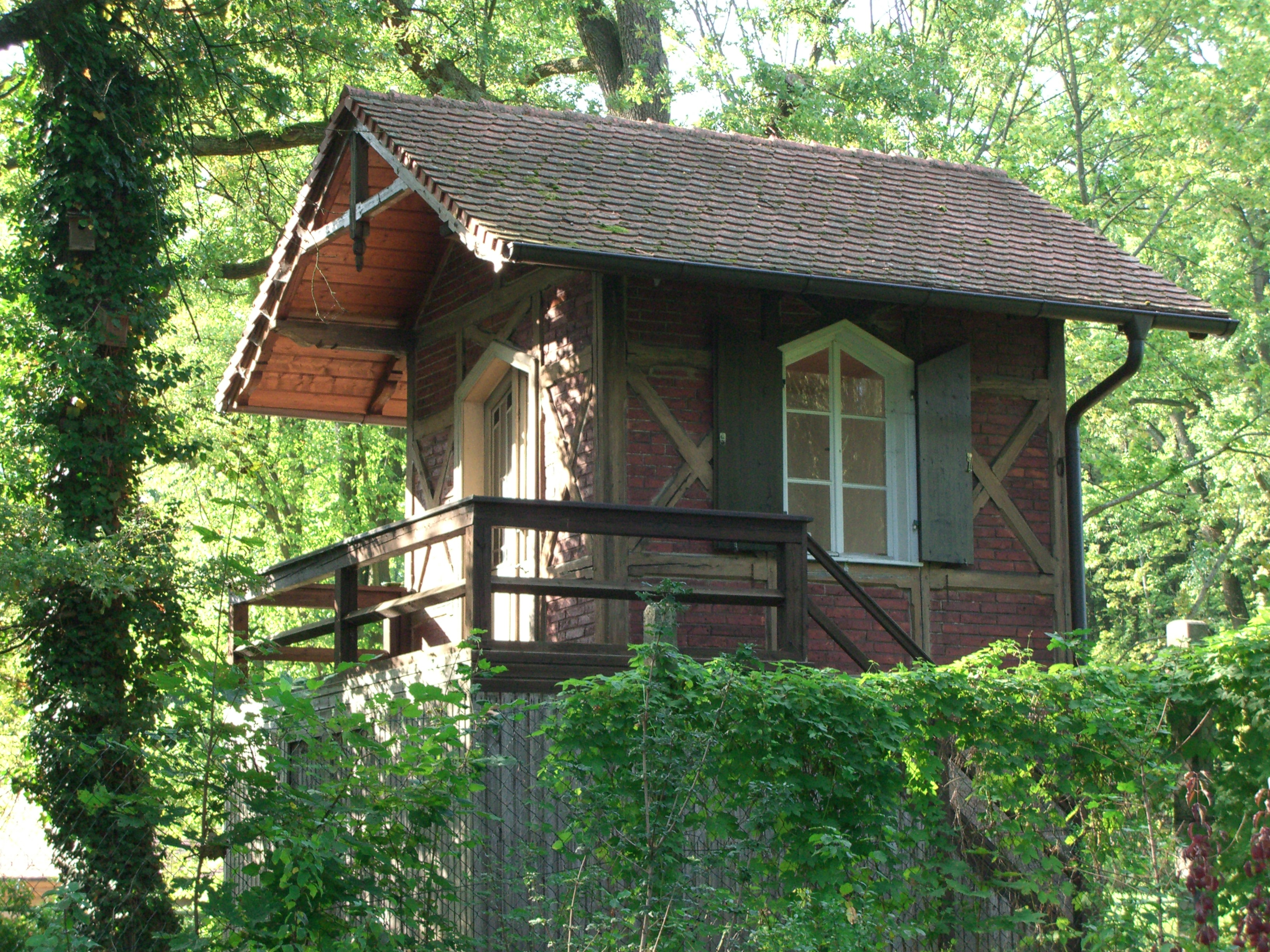
A summer house on the Burgberg next to the Burgberggarten, September 2006

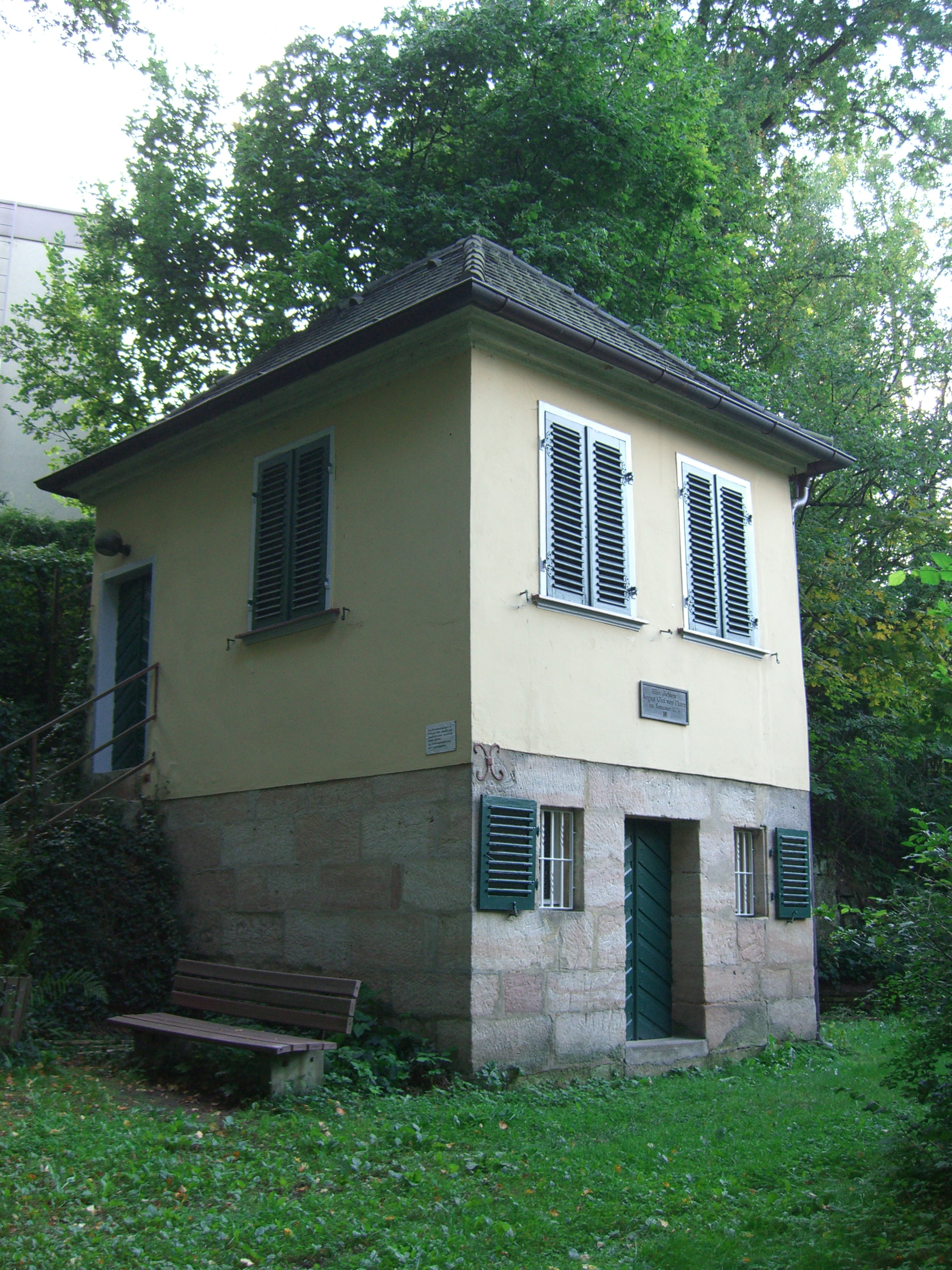
One of the small two storey houses, September 2006

In addition to the Bergkirchweih, the Altstädter shooting gallery and the beer cellars, other popular excursion destinations developed on the castle hill in the 18th and 19th century, and became meeting places for local society. Professors and dignitaries of the city erected small sheds in their gardens, some with fountains and staircases, such as the two-storey houses on the north side of Strawberry Hill.

In the forest area of the Solitude, located on the north-west slope of the hill, above the Jewish cemetery, many romanticists from Erlangen enjoyed nature in the 19th century. A well-known attraction was the spring at the Solitude, above the Rudelsweiher pond, which was already in Bubenreuth territory, from where people enjoyed hiking to the inns and the observation tower on the Rathsberg.

The area of the Solitude is also known as the Eisgrube (ice pit). In winter, when the ice cover of the ponds was at least 30 cm thick, a larger plate was cut out, pulled to the shore and cut into customary blocks, e.g. 60 × 20 × 110 cm. The ice blocks were taken to the former quarries (ice pits) in this shady and humid forest area and bought by the breweries. Stacked in rock cellars, the ice remained in place until next autumn. Some beer cellars also crossed the Burgberg in the past and were able to import the ice directly.

In 1928 the Corps Guestphalia "An den Kellern 45" inaugurated the new Corps House, which stands on the site of the Birkners Cellar and is still a meeting place for many students during the Bergkirchweih.

Directly east of the Burgberg garden, the imperial postmaster Ruprecht Wels established a terraced restaurant and amusement park, the so-called Welsgarten, in 1770. The Erlangen Burschenschaft was founded there on 1 December 1817. A commemorative plaque on the lowest terrace wall commemorates this event. The garden was parcelled out at the beginning of the 20th century and built with villas. One of these villas is now the seat of the Erlangen Music Institute. Even today, the castle hill is still the first address of the city and is built with villas and spacious single-family houses.
