= Craft beer tourism =

Form of tourism focused on craft beer

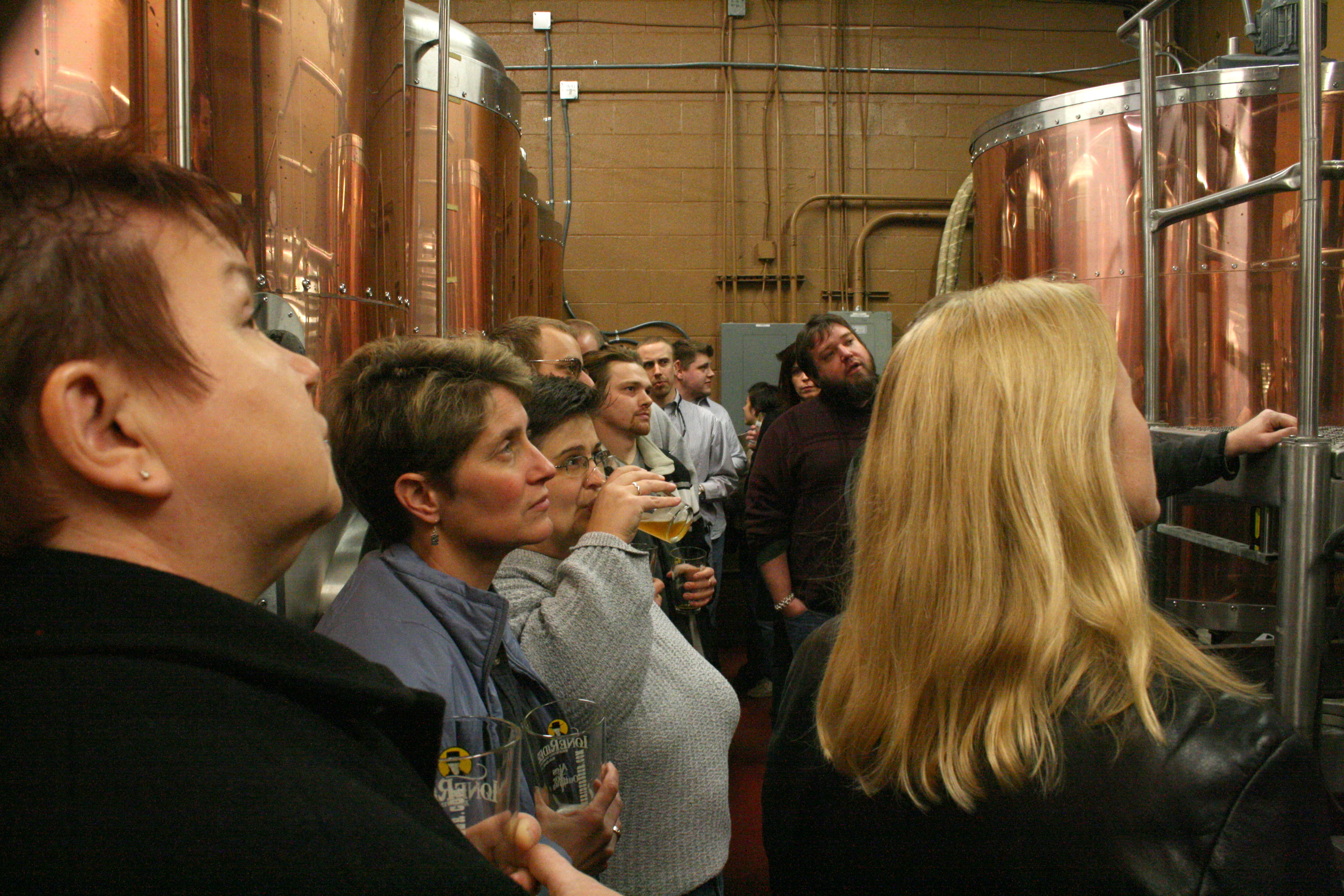
Tour of Lonerider Brewing, Raleigh, North Carolina

Craft beer tourism refers to tourism where the primary motivation of travel is to visit a brewery, beer festival, beer related activity or other event that allows attendees to experience all aspects of the craft beer-making, consuming and purchasing process. Travel and tourism constitute one of the largest industries in the world, with Americans spending a total of $1.1 trillion in domestic and international travel in 2018. The beer tourism industry has evolved from the larger culinary and beverage tourism category in which people began planning travels based around experiencing food and drink of different geographies. Informally, vacations centric to the theme of enjoying beer have been dubbed "beercations".

== History ==
The theory behind beer tourism is that people want to feel more connected to the beer that they are drinking. People have always been traveling to explore different cultures, geographies and even foods. Tourism within the beverage industry has long seen success with the development of enotourism—tourism related to the wine consumption and making process. Regions such as Northern California, and Tuscany have seen a large influx of tourists whose sole purpose is to sample the regions' wine. Beer tourism has seen an increase in recent years due to the rising popularity of craft beer and increased prevalence of microbreweries. In a study done by Nielsen it is reported that the average American has visited 2.1 breweries in the last year while traveling. The cultural movement of neolocalism, a movement aimed at preserving the identity of a community and promoting aspects that make it culturally unique, is stimulating this surge in microbrewery success. People want to purchase and consume products that are tied to the geography in which they are located. A study investigating the factors of craft beer success found that the factor that communities found most important in establishing brand loyalty was the connection that the brewery had to the local community. This brings an explanation to the names, logos and imagery that are tied to the local geography in so many brewing establishments.

== Culture ==
Craft beer, by definition, is brewed by small independent brewers. Small breweries often make beers that reflect the tastes of local beer drinkers, and sometimes contain local ingredients. For example, in the United States, West Coast-style India Pale Ale (IPA) can smell and taste different that New England IPA due to the different brewing processes. Vermont brewers created a “hazy” version of Pale Ale and IPA using a particular type of yeast and brewing process. Other brewers across the globe may adopt these techniques or ingredients and put their own local twist on it. Microbreweries are said to be "hyper-local" in sourcing their ingredients from the local environment, giving their beer even more local character. For example, Colorado based, Crooked Stave Brewery uses locally sourced fruits such as peaches and apricots in all of their flavored beers; similarly, Yazoo Brewing in Nashville, Tennessee uses locally sourced honey as a sweetener in each of its flagship beers. Craft beer bars and breweries offer craft beer tourists the opportunity to mingle with locals, and experience different environments and cultures through a shared love of craft beer.

== Destinations ==
Many cities throughout the country have benefited from the brewery tourism industry. The craft beer industry contributed $79 billion to the United States economy and was responsible for 559,545 jobs in 2018 alone. Some cities have emerged as popular beercation destinations for travelers.

=== Denver, Colorado ===
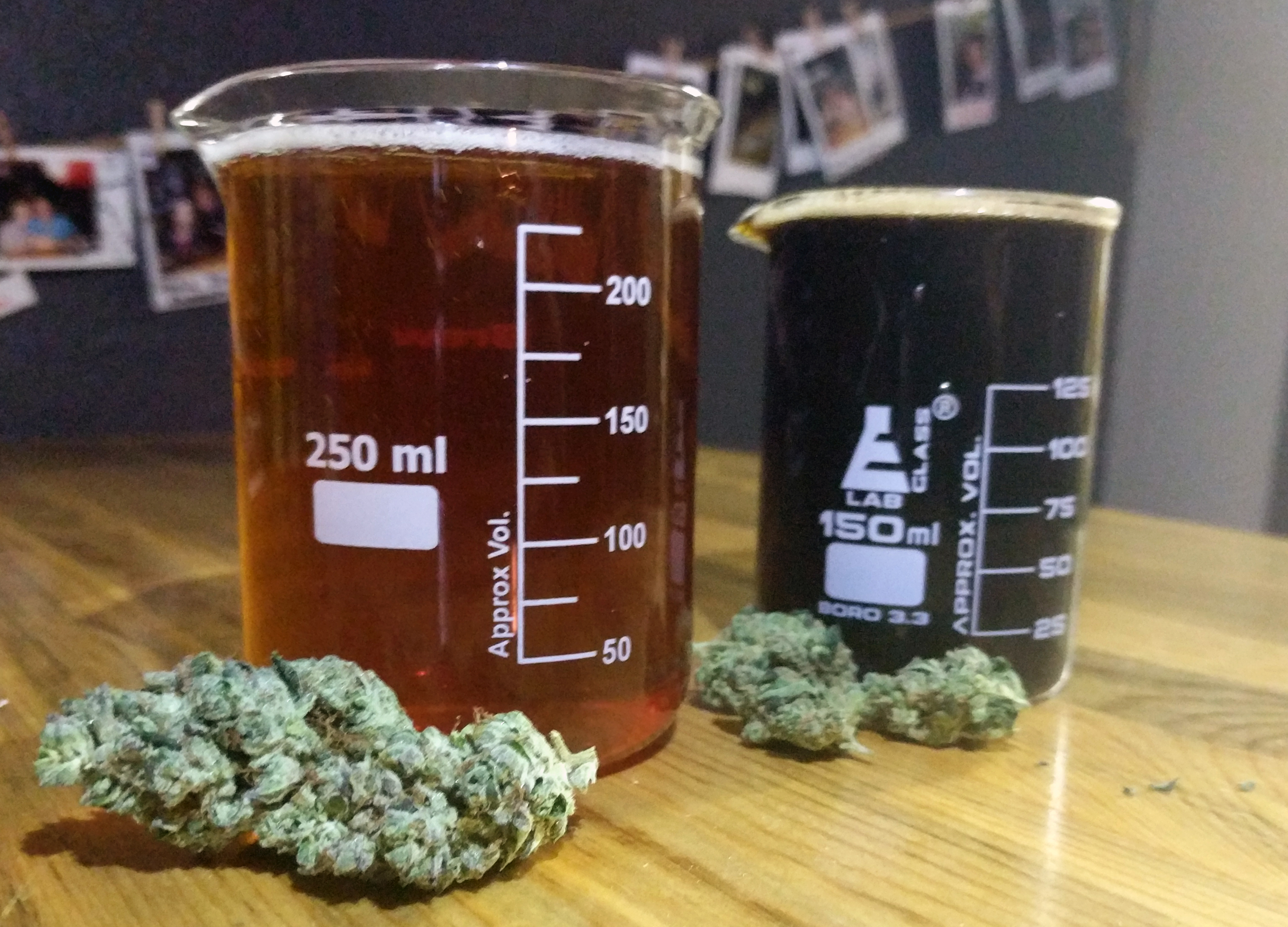
Advertisement for Denver Based "Buds and Brew" Tour

Denver, Colorado is a city that has a long track record of success when it comes to brewing dating back to 1873 and the establishment of Coors Brewing Company. Denver is home to 72 breweries, and over 150 breweries when including its surrounding suburbs. This is the most of any metro area in America. Along with the sheer number of Breweries, Denver, also has long been a hub for beer making and tasting. Denver hosts America's largest beer festival, The Great American Beer Festival, which is held every year in Denver and is hosted by the Brewery Association of America which is headquartered in nearby Boulder, Colorado. The Great American Beer Fest was visited by over 90,000 people, 800 breweries were represented and over 4,000 different beers were showcased in 2019. Denver also offers a "Buds and Brews" beer and cannabis tour that allows tourists to explore both the flourishing cannabis and craft beer scene in Denver. Denver's RiNo District, River North, is a neighborhood in northern Denver, described as Denver's arts district, that is home to many different craft breweries over a small area. Popular stops on a Denver, Colorado brewery trip are Great Divide Brewing, River North Brewery and Wynkoop Brewing Company.

=== Portland, Oregon ===
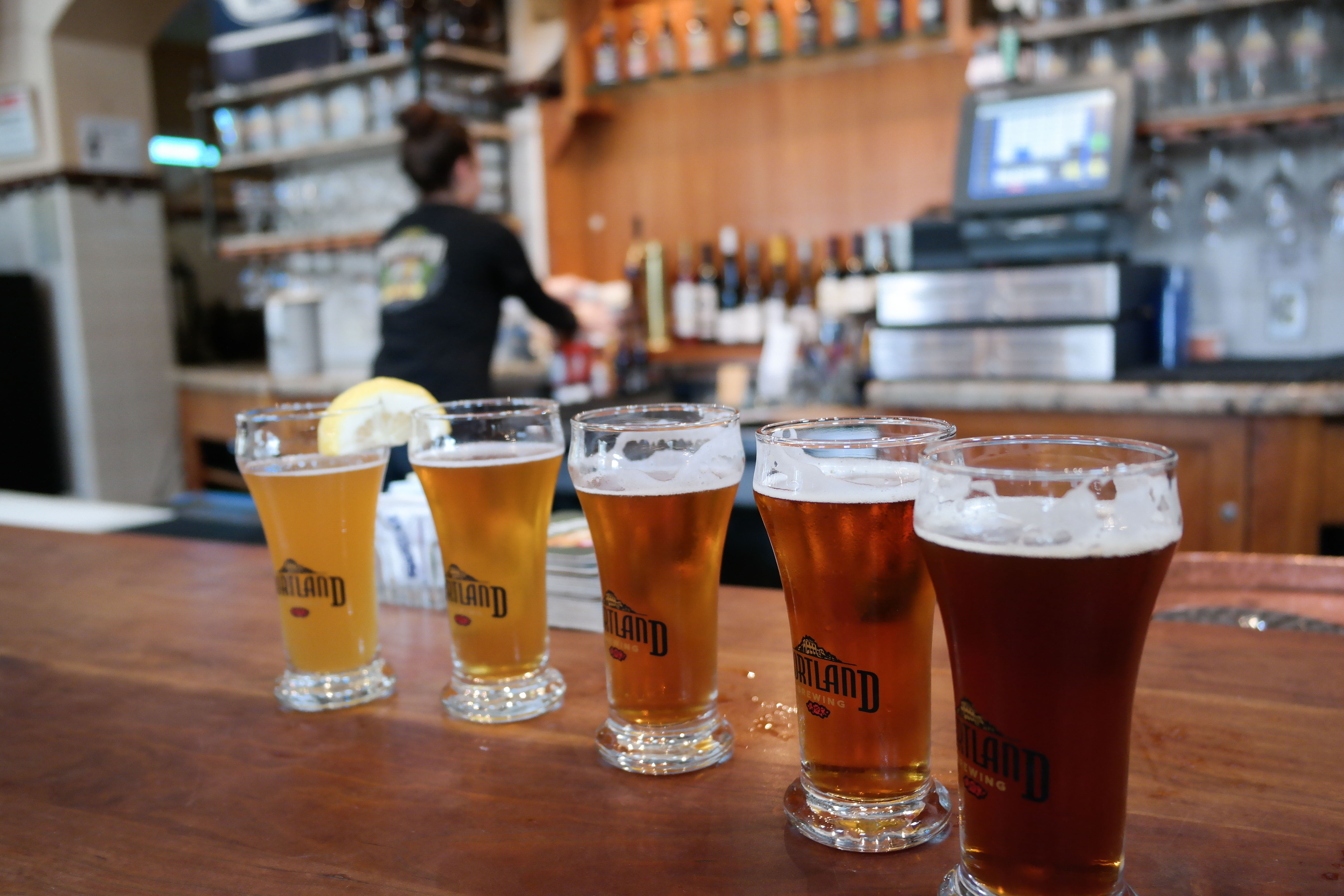
Beer flight at Portland Brewing Co. in Portland, Oregon

Portland, Oregon is a medium-sized west coast city that is home to over 70 breweries within its city limits. Portland's craft beer scene is considered by many to be the most impressive of any in America. With such an impressive craft beer and brewing scene the city of Portland, Oregon has been nicknamed "Beervana". Oregon has over 19 million visitors to the state who attributed a portion of their vacation to visiting a brewery, more than any other state in the United States. Oregon is also the second largest producer of Hops in the United States; 15% of the total U.S. Hop production. The Oregon brewing industry continues to support job growth in the state, employing roughly 31,000 Oregonians, and contributing $4.49 billion to the state's economy. The craft beer industry added around 1,340 jobs between 2014 and 2016, a growth of nearly 22 percent. Unique to Portland's beer scene is Zwickelmania which is a weekend long open house that allows tourists free access to all the sites in all of the breweries in the city. Portland even has a hotel specially designed for beer vacationers called the Kennedy School Hotel which has a brewery, built inside a former public school. Portland's inner-southeast district has emerged as a popular stop for beer drinkers. The neighborhood was once the industrial center of the city, but the industry has given way to a growing art scene, and abandoned factories and warehouses are being converted into restaurants and brewing operations. Frequented stops on a Portland, Oregon "beercation" are Cascade Barrelhouse, Level Brewing, and Ecliptic Brewery.

=== Portland, Maine ===
Portland, Maine is a small city in northern New England. With a population of only 66,882 people, Portland has the most breweries per capita of any city in America at 25 breweries per 100,000 residents. This coastal city is best known for its seafood and great beaches, but it is also now recognized as the beer capital of New England. The New England Craft Beer Summit is hosted every year in Portland, Maine. The weekend is highlighted by educational workshops for Brewers looking to open a businesses as well as tastings and activities for visitors to come an explore beer from across New England. Portland remains a very small city in terms of area which means that beer travelers enjoy the luxury of ease of access being able to walk to a high number of breweries in a small radius. Portland's arts district located on the north-eastern edge of the city is clustered with outdoor theaters, coffee shops, and brewing operations including the famed Shipyard Brewing Company. Converted warehouses house different brewing operations, many of them even under the same roof. In 2017 alone 9 million tourists to the city of Portland, Maine visited a brewery, 1 in 5 tourists. Frequented stops on a Portland, Maine beercation include, Bissell Brothers Brewing Company, Allagash Brewing, and Novares Bier Cafe.

=== San Francisco, California ===
San Francisco may be the birthplace of the craft beer movement since Fritz Maytag rescued the struggling Anchor Brewing Company in 1965. He refined the Anchor Steam Beer recipe in the early 70’s and started brewing porter, barleywine and an annual Christmas ale. Today the San Francisco Brewer’s Guild has more than 30 members representing craft breweries across the 46 square miles of the city. Some of the most iconic craft breweries in San Francisco include 21st Amendment Brewery in the South of Market (SOMA) neighborhood near Oracle Park, Magnolia Brewing Company, Cellarmaker Brewing Company, and Anchor Brewing Company.

== Activities ==
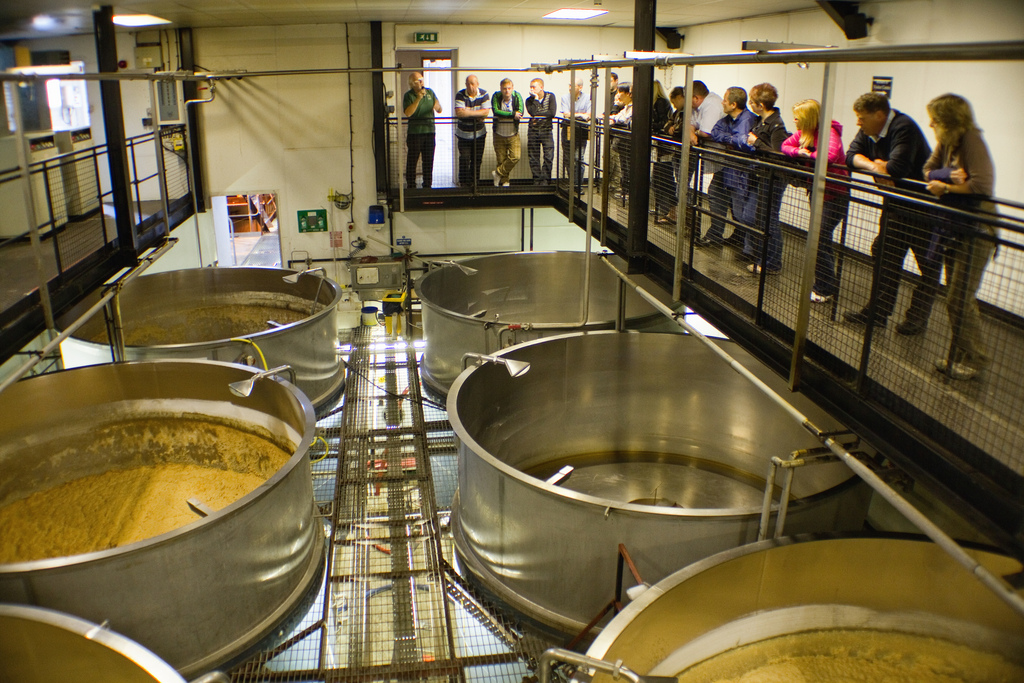
Brewery tour at Black Sheep brewing company

=== Facility tours ===
Facility tours are interactive experiences in which visitors of a brewery are guided through the facilities of the brewery by either a tour guide or beer maker. Visitors are educated on the different processes in a brewery from canning and bottling to the fermentation process. Tour guides will often explain the history of the brewery highlighting certain aspects of the breweries founding, and the tours sometimes come with a complimentary tasting. Dog Fish Head's facility tour in Milton, Delaware costs $30 per tour and tour-goers are given complete access to the facility, and are gifted with a complimentary tasting and souvenir beer glass.

=== City brewery tours ===
City beer tours differ city to city and tour company to tour company, but the general premise remains the same. Tour companies set up tours with local beer makers and breweries that allow for patrons of the tour to receive free samples and tastings at different breweries with the price of admission for the tour. Tours also usually offer transportation between locations, some provide transport via bus, others include organized biking or walking tours. Many tours may also be paired with food from a local restaurant. BeerQuest Beer Tours in downtown Portland, Oregon offers both a walking and biking tour, and even include seasonal holiday and haunted pub crawls as well. Tapped Enterprises in Long Island, New York offers a Bay Brews, and Fishing Cruise Tour, which includes stops at local breweries, finished off with an afternoon of Flounder fishing in Long Island Sound.

=== Beer gardens ===
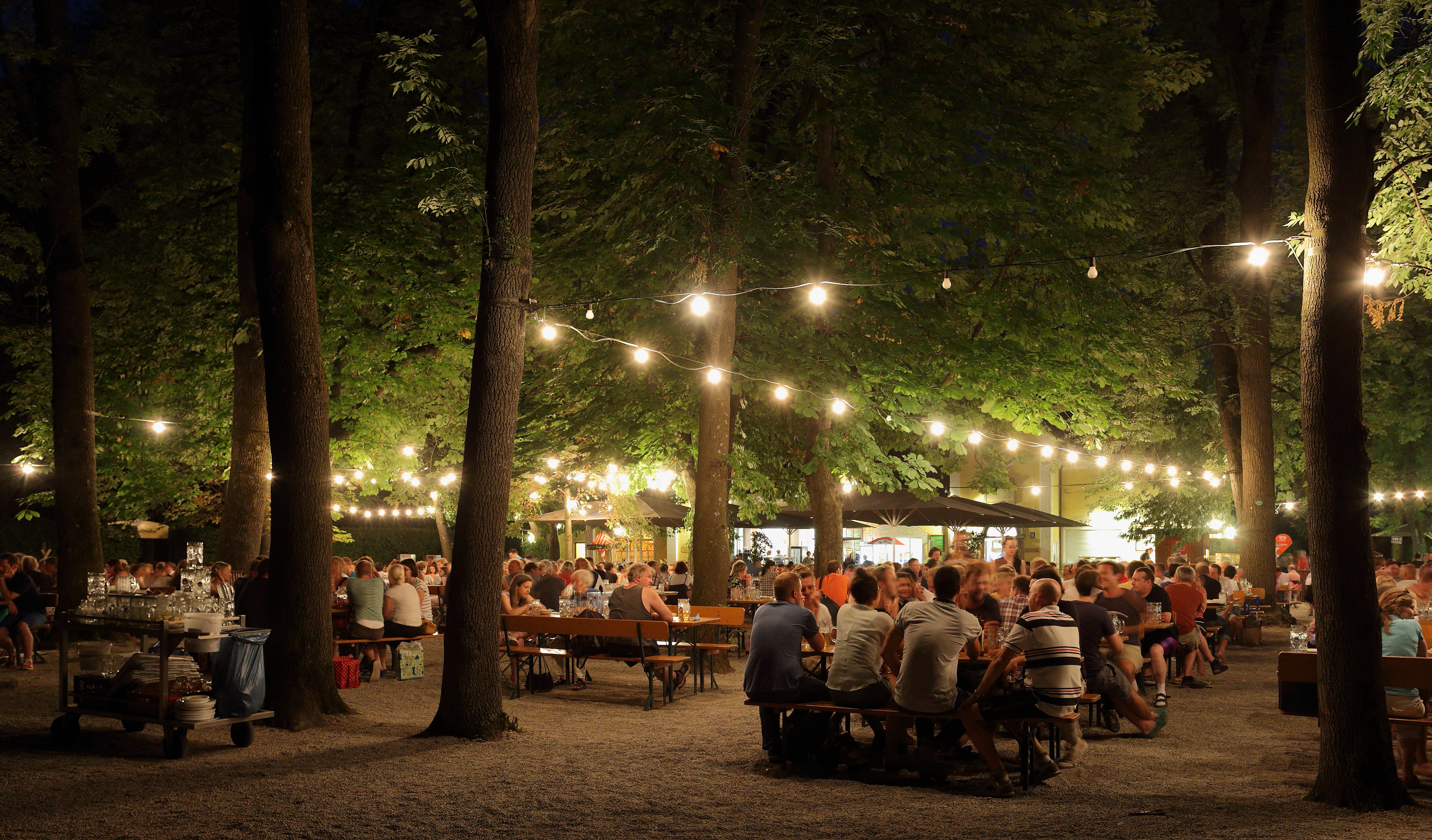
Taxisgarten, a traditional beer garden in Munich pictured at night

A beer garden is an outdoor area where beer and local food is served. The areas are typically surrounded by trees or green space giving them the "garden" portion of their name. Beer gardens are traditionally accompanied by live local music and seating is communal featuring long tables and benches to facilitate conversation. Rising Tide Brewing in Portland, Maine features a beer garden and during weekends in the summer they have live music, local food trucks and even local farm vendors. Beer gardens trace their roots back to Germany where early brewers were forced by law to brew their beer in summer months, and because of the heat they stored their beer underground in cellars to keep it cool, and because of this, drinking the beer on the premises where it was stored resulted in outdoor beer gardens.

== Future ==
=== Infrastructure to support growth ===
There are important political and economic infrastructure that has been in place that supports the growth of the beer and brewing industry. The craft brewing industry has benefitted from a recent break on excise tax levied on alcohol producers. Microbreweries fall under the "craft beverage" distinction which gives beer producers the benefits of a lower tax on the beer produced to $16 per barrel on the first six million barrels brewed and lowered it to $3.50 per barrel for small brewers on the first 60,000 barrels produced domestically. In addition to the tax benefit, Microbreweries have also gained more power in state politics with the establishment of state brewing guilds and associations. These organizations serve as a unified voice for all breweries within a state. They operate to lobby for the protections necessary to fairly license, regulate, tax, distribute and enforce the legal sale of beer in a safe and beneficial way within their communities. Brewers Guilds also often host festivals, or city and state "brewery weeks" to bring attention to the local beer businesses. In 2018 it was reported that every state in the United States had some form of brewing guild, association or group that could represent the brewing community in state-wide matters. Ability to self-distribute is also an important factor in the continued growth of craft brewery success. In 36 out of 50 states craft breweries are able to distribute directly to consumers using their own distribution channels which allows for brewers to obtain higher gross margin and not have to rely on existing distribution channels. This also allows for tourists to come directly to a brewery and purchase beer to bring home with them instead of hoping that a local retailer carries the beer. There is significant push-back from local government in many states on this issue.

=== Online applications and social media ===
Untappd Smartphone App Logo

The beer and brewing industry as with any other has developed a following online in the form of social media. Multiple websites and social media applications have established platforms that allow for the sharing, recommending and reviewing of local beers and breweries. Beeradvocate.com has emerged as "the go to resource for beer" and allows users to rank, share, and review beers of different beer makers across the world. Beeradvocate also has a ranking feature that compiles a list of reviews from all of its users to rank that the total cumulative score of beers by its users. Untappd is another beer sharing application that promotes the tourism of beer and breweries. Untappd is an app for iOS and Android devices that allows users to rate, review and comment on beers and breweries. The app allows users to tag certain friends and post pictures and "check-in" at local bars and breweries to let their friends know they are trying a new beer.

=== Beer Tourism Index ===
In 2015 the popular travel and accommodation booking website, Travelocity.com, conducted a survey on to their users aimed at exploring the purpose for their users travel. When a substantial portion of the survey respondents indicated that visiting a brewery or sampling local beer was a reason for their travel, the website decided to established the first 'Beer Tourism Index' that is used to rank metro areas throughout the United States on how conducive the destination is to a good "beercation". The Index ranked cities based on four main criteria, the prevalence of breweries, availability of rideshare services, accessibility via air, and the average cost of lodging.
