= Bailey's Taproom =

Defunct bar in Portland, Oregon, U.S.

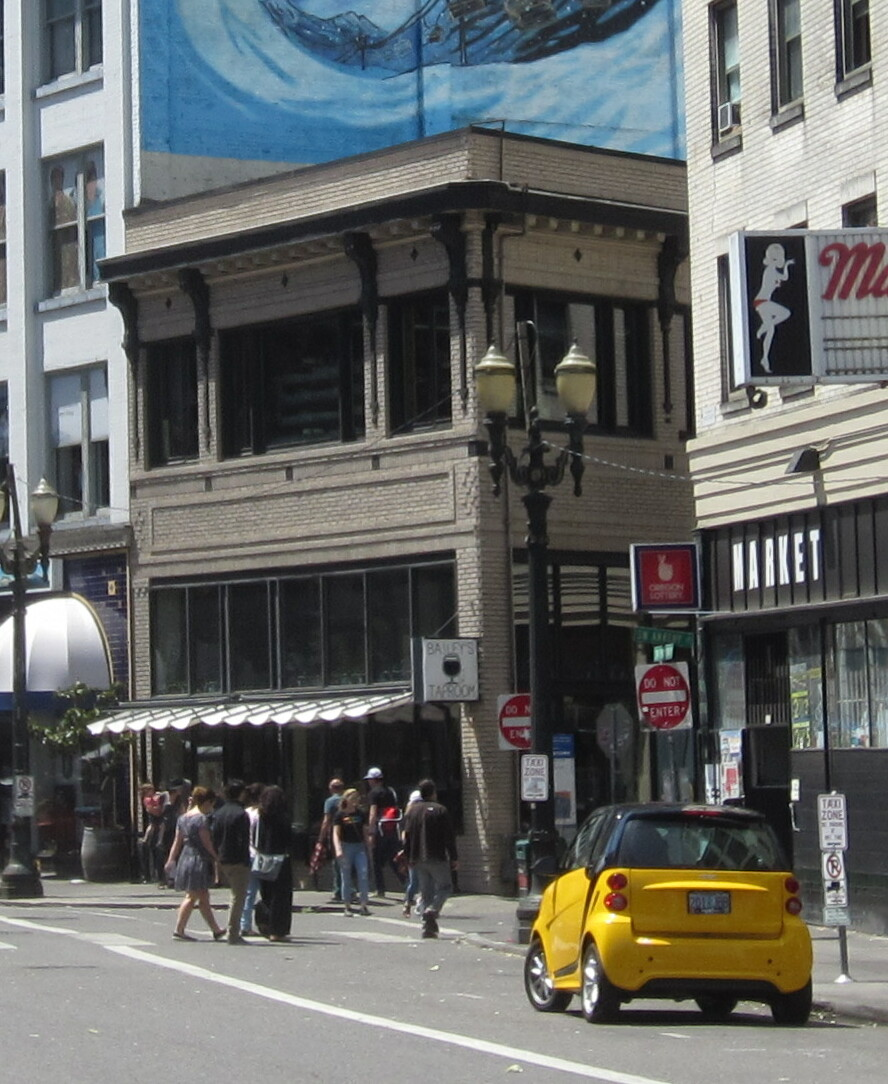
- The bar's exterior, 2016
- Interactive map of Bailey's Taproom

Restaurant information
- Established: 2007
- Closed: February 2021
- Owner: Geoff Phillips
- Food type: Beer
- Location: 213 Southwest Broadway, Portland, Multnomah, Oregon, 97205, United States
- Coordinates: 45.5225°N 122.6781°W
- Website: baileystaproom.com

Bailey's Taproom was a beer bar in downtown Portland, Oregon, United States. The bar, which was established by owner Geoff Phillips in 2007, was a popular destination for craft beer tourism and garnered a positive reception. The bar had a second-floor sibling establishment called The Upper Lip, which was also known as Bailey's Upper Lip. Both establishments closed in 2021 during the COVID-19 pandemic.

== Description ==
Bailey's Taproom was a beer bar in Southwest Portland's Trident building. According to the travel guide Frommer's, Bailey's Taproom had large windows and prioritized Oregon beers. The space had a "handsome", minimalist decor and hosted board games, darts, and regular events. In her 2011 book "Cheap Bastard's Guide to Portland, Oregon", Rachel Dresbeck said the open space had an "industrial-chic feel" and allowed for "cheap and interesting" dates. The bar offered 24 rotating taps and growler fills, and allowed food to be ordered from nearby eateries.

== History ==
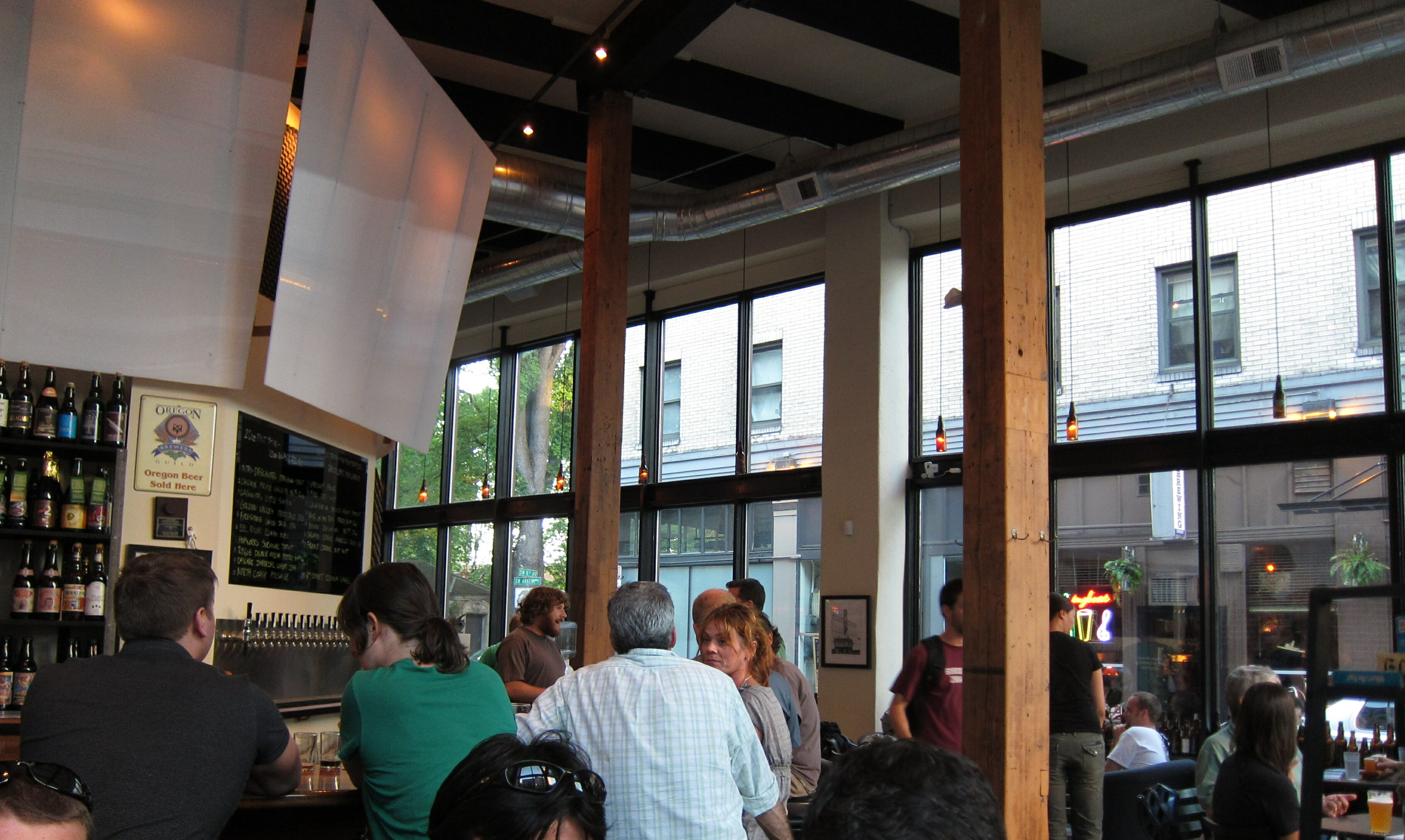
The bar's interior in 2010

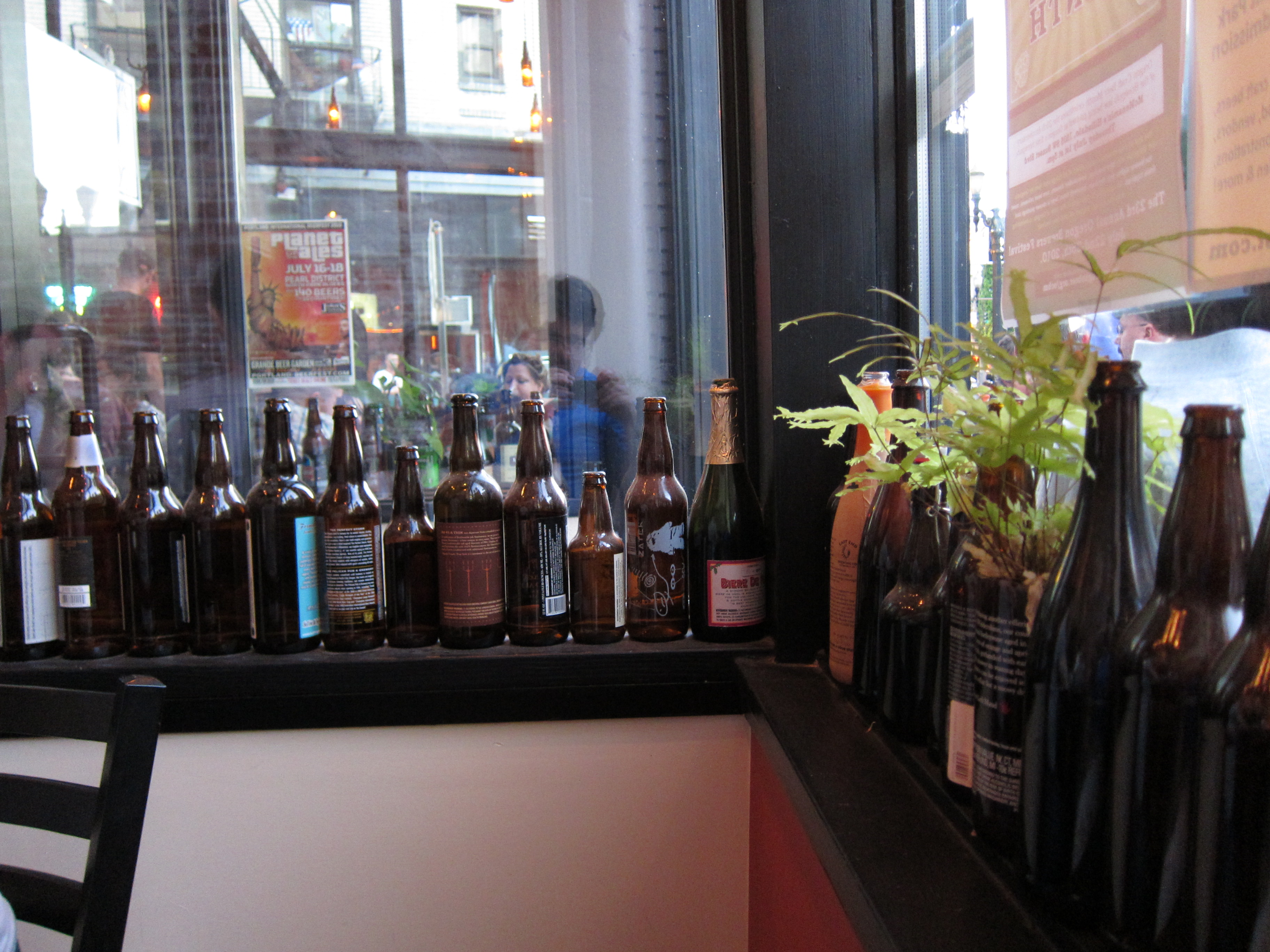
Bottles lining the window sills, 2010

Bailey's Taproom opened in downtown Portland in 2007. Owner Geoff Phillips drove to craft breweries to source unique kegs for the bar. The formula was popular with locals and tourists. The magazine GQ noted that it had a keg-tracking system that "ensure[d] you never get the dregs of the Northwest's best hops bombs." Bailey's emphasis was on local and Oregon beers but also served some rare and unusual beers from California and Washington. The business installed a beer engine in 2008.

Bailey's began hosting CellarFest in 2010. The bar also hosted a yearly Belgium-themed event called Belgianfest, and used the 2016 event "to launch the first of its Hausbier releases, a year-round series which begins with a Belgian lager from The Commons". In 2017, Bailey's Taproom hosted the New Oregon Breweries Showcase, which featured eleven new Oregon breweries. The bar also hosted Killer Beer Fest, the final event of Brewpublic's 9th Annual Killer Beer Week, which was held at various locations in the area.

During the COVID-19 pandemic, Bailey's Taproom operated in Ankeny Square and via food delivery services. In February 2021, Phillips announced the closure of Bailey's Taproom and The Upper Lip, attributing the closures in part to the pandemic. Bailey's had closed indefinitely in September 2020. Christopher Bjorke of the Portland Business Journal called the business a "victim" and wrote, "The popular pub known for the excellence of its beer selection could not survive the extended closure in a downtown area turned desolate by the pandemic." Phillips sold the building and reused some of the bar's furniture when he opened another bar named Level 3 later in 2021.

== Reception ==
Julian Smith of travel guide Frommer's rated Bailey's Taproom with one star out of three, and said the bar's "constantly changing taps with an amazing range of brews helps rank this place above most Portland beer bars". Portland Monthly said the bar was staffed with a "chipper cast of beer nerds" who could offer helpful suggestions; the magazine recommended the five-beer sampler tray and included Bailey's Taproom in a 2017 list of 20 "essential" Portland bars. Michael Russell included both Bailey's Taproom and The Upper Lip in The Oregonian's 2014 and 2016 lists of the city's 10 best beer bars and 21 essential bars, respectively. In his 2015 book The Best Beer in the World, Mark Dredge described Bailey's Taproom as "modern and cool" with a "superb" beer list. Nathan Isaacs included Bailey's Taproom in U.S. News & World Report's 2017 list of seven "great" bars in Portland and said it "aims to cater to beer connoisseurs as well as uninitiated beer drinkers".

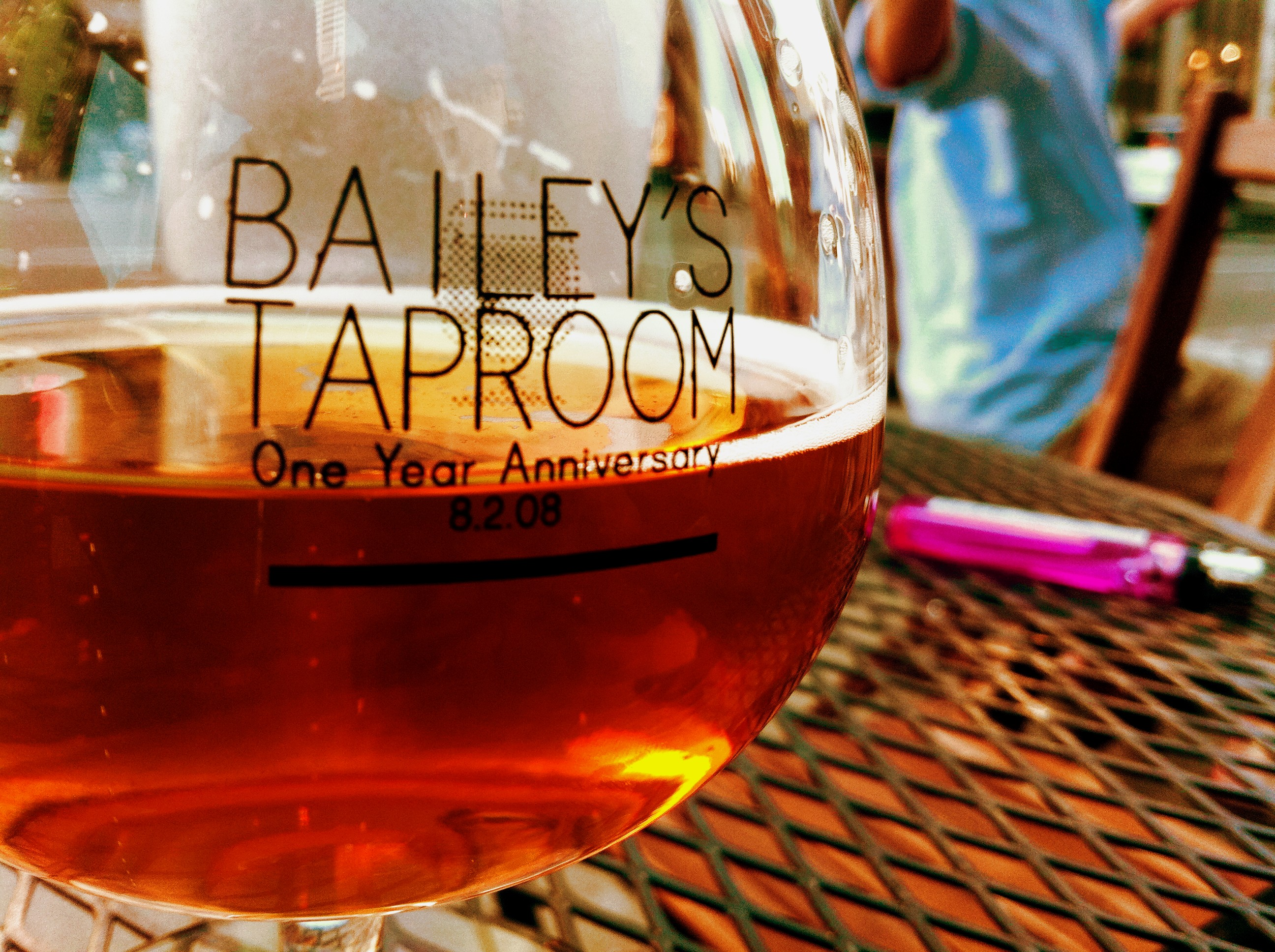
Pranqster Belgian Style Golden Ale

The Willamette Week named Bailey's Taproom one of the best bars in Portland on several occasions. The business was a runner-up in the Best Beer Selection on Tap category in the newspaper's annual readers' poll. Willamette Week also included Bailey's Taproom in a 2017 list of the "best Portland bars for hardcore beer geeks", citing it as downtown Portland's most-popular establishment of its type. Martin Cizmar of the same outlet called the bar "vaunted", and Matthew Korfhage included the bar in a 2018 list of "the 10 best and most iconic" beer bars in Oregon.

Thrillist described Bailey's Taproom as a "well-worn PDX favorite". The website's Alexander Frane included Bailey's Taproom in a 2017 list of the city's best beer bars, and wrote, "It's cramped and busy, especially on weekends, but Bailey's is the best beer bar downtown, with great beers and excellent service." Pete Cottell included the bar in Thrillist's 2018 "beer drinker's ultimate guide to Portland" and wrote, "you simply won't find a bigger or better list of beers that are guaranteed to surprise even the most hardened beer snob." Frane also included Bailey's Taproom and The Upper Lip in Eater Portland's 2019 list of 13 "stellar beer bars to hit in Portland". In 2022, Janey Wong of Eater Portland called Bailey's Taproom "one of the city's best beer bars". In 2020, Andy Giegerich of the Portland Business Journal called the bar a "Portland craft beer mecca" that he said was "known for its customer service, which included early adoption of the DigitalPour board". (Note: Bailey's was the first bar to install the software DigitalPour.)

== See also ==
- Brewing in Oregon
- Impact of the COVID-19 pandemic on the restaurant industry in the United States
