= Beer festival =

Event with a variety of beers available

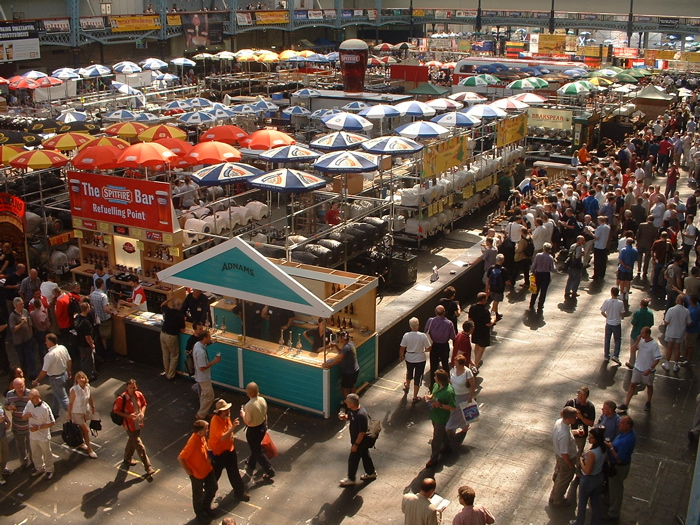
Great British Beer Festival, London

A beer festival is an event at which a variety of beers are available for purchase. There may be a theme, for instance beers from a particular area, or a particular brewing style such as winter ales.

== Asia ==
=== China ===
- Qingdao International Beer Festival

=== Israel ===
Israel hosts several annual beer festivals, with the largest and oldest one being the Jerusalem Beer Festival, attracting 20,000 visitors and running for 15 years, serving 120 different kinds of beer.

Other annual beer festivals in Israel take place in the following towns and cities:

- Afula
- Ashalim
- Ashdod
- Ashkelon
- Ein Shemer
- Givataim
- Givat Ada
- Hod Hasharon
- Kfar Saba
- Modi'in
- Naharia
- Netanya
- Petah Tikva
- Tekoa

=== Singapore ===
- Singapore holds an annual Beer Festival, Beerfest Asia, in June each year. It was first held in 2008 and attracts over 30,000 beer lovers.

== Europe ==
=== Germany ===
Germany has an old tradition of manifold festivals which are more than beer festivals. Usually, they are not only "beer drinking events", they are fun fairs and folk festivals. Many of them are held for centuries and have their origins in parish fairs, markets and trade fairs or other historical reasons. In some German regions, especially in South West Germany fun fairs are more connected with wine than beer festivals. It is commonly said that the largest beer festival in the world is Oktoberfest in Germany, though some argue that is actually a folk festival, not a beer festival.

Several other smaller beer festivals are held all over Germany throughout the year. The second largest beer festival in Germany and probably in Europe, is the Cannstatter Volksfest, hosted on the Cannstatter Wasen in the Bad Canstatt district of Stuttgart. It starts one week later and is very similar in character to Oktoberfest. Its popularity increases and more and more people come from around the world to visit the festival every year.

Many places have beer festivals styled as "Oktoberfests", but taken on its own the name is generally taken to mean for the Munich event. Smaller beer festivals similar to the Oktoberfest are common in Germany and take place throughout the year in most bigger German cities. Some of them go on later into the night than the Oktoberfest.

Another large genuine Bavarian festival is the Gäubodenvolksfest in Straubing. The festival is similar to Oktoberfest but it has an own history and it is not a copy of the Oktoberfest, as is the Barthelmarkt by Manching, which even dates back to Roman times. Other large festivals in Bavaria are Nürnberg Volksfeste in spring and autumn, Fürth Michaeliskirchweih (held since 12th century) and the Bergkirchweih in Erlangen, with the largest open-air beer garden in Europe.

Other beer festivals include the Hanover Schützenfest, the Freimarkt in Bremen, the Hamburger Dom, the Stuttgarter Frühlingsfest, the Cranger Funfair, the Düsseldorf Funfair. Like the Oktoberfest and the Cannstatter Volksfest, most German beer festivals are also funfairs. They are called "Volksfest" (festival for the people) and are numerous in Germany.

An emerging festival located in Berlin boasts the world's longest beer garden. The International Berlin Beer Festival hosts over 2,100 different beers from 86 countries.

=== United Kingdom ===
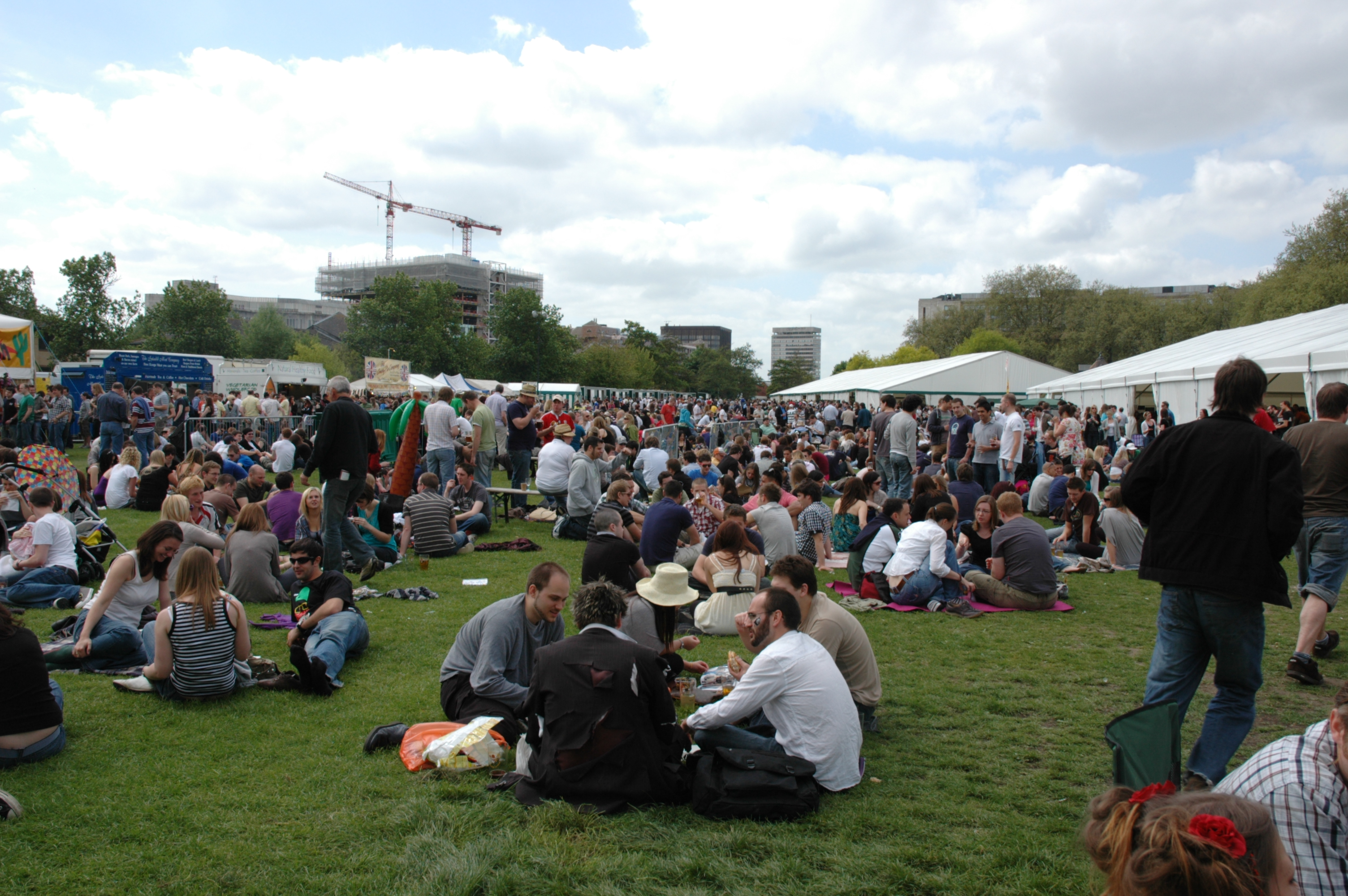
Reading Beer Festival 2009

British beer festivals focus on draught real ale, although bottled beers and ciders are often included. There is also an emphasis on variety as well as volume.

Festivals can be organised by the Campaign for Real Ale (CAMRA), pubs, brewers, social and sporting societies or charities. CAMRA festivals are run by volunteers under the direction of local branches and the admission fee is reduced or waived for CAMRA members. Pub festivals use professional bar staff and there is usually no entry fee.

Larger British beer festivals are usually held in large indoor venues (Kensington Olympia in the case of the GBBF). Casks of ale from different brewers, numbering in the hundreds, are placed on stillage behind rows of trestle tables. Staff serve beer directly from the cask and take payment in the form of cash or tokens purchased at the entrance. Cooling is achieved using wet sacking or blankets for evaporative cooling or though refrigerated cooling saddles and coils. Glasses are distributed at the entrance to the venue, usually for a small deposit although often included in the entrance fee, often bearing a design specific to the festival. A beer list is usually available, often indicating where in the venue the different casks will be situated. Food is usually available, and entertainment and games such as live music, pub quizzes or tombolas are often organised.

Medium-sized festival are typically held in meeting halls or marquees. These include festivals organised by local CAMRA branches, Round Tables or by other clubs and charities. They may be themed, emphasizing beers from a certain region or in a particular style, for instance, the Winter Great British Beer Festival (Formerly the National Winter Ales Festival).

If a pub is well-provided with handpumps, it can put on a small festival by rotating guest beers rapidly through them. Alternatively, a temporary stillage may be set up inside the bar, or in a tent outside. Pub-based festivals usually last a weekend, (in fact, often a long weekend). The pubco Wetherspoons holds simultaneous festivals twice-yearly in all the hundreds of branches in its chain, lasting over two weeks, and using the handpump rotation method. It claims its festivals are Britain's largest. The number of different beers that can be provided in a pub festival ranges from about 15 to about 100.

In all British festivals the beer is sold in quantities of half or full pints. From 2006 the GBBF additionally served beer in "nips", i.e. one-third of a pint (0.2 L; 0.4 US pt), for the benefit of those who wish to sample many beers without consuming excessive amounts of alcohol.

==== Notable British beer festivals ====
Beer festivals are held across the United Kingdom. Notable ones include:

- The Great British Beer Festival held annually in August in London is the largest beer festival in the UK organised by the Campaign for Real Ale. The "GBBF", founded in 1977, was attended by over 66,000 people in 2006 when 350,000 imperial pints (200,000 L; 420,000 US pt) pints of ale were consumed over the five days. In the past it has been held at various locations but London has been its venue since 1991.
- The CAMRA Great British Beer Festival Winter; held at various locations, currently Birmingham, is designed to showcase beer styles which may not be readily available during the summer festival. Taking place every February, it has also been celebrated in Glasgow, Burton-on-Trent, Manchester, Derby and Norwich.
- The Farnham Beer Exhibition in Surrey, having been held every year since 1977 at the Farnham Maltings, is the longest-running beer festival to be held annually on a single site in the United Kingdom, and every year sells over 29,000 imperial pints (16,000 L; 35,000 US pt) of real ale during its 3-day opening.
- The Cambridge Beer Festival, held since 1974, is the longest running beer festival, although it has changed venue three times. Currently, it is held for a week each May in a large marquee erected on Jesus Green in Cambridge. It is the third largest British beer festival behind London and Peterborough. In 2007, it was attended by 30,384 visitors, who drank about 70,000 imperial pints (40,000 L; 84,000 US pt) of beer and 194 tubs of cider and perry.
- The Rotherham Real Ale and Music Festival, held since 1992 is the largest Real Ale Festival in the North of England. In 2011, the festival sold in excess of 85,000 half pints (24,200 L; 51,000 US pt) of beer during its four-day opening.
- The Battersea Beer Festival, is a three-day-long annual festival held at the Battersea Arts Centre, Battersea, London, since 1991.

In addition, many small festivals are organised by local CAMRA branches, pubs, clubs and charities.

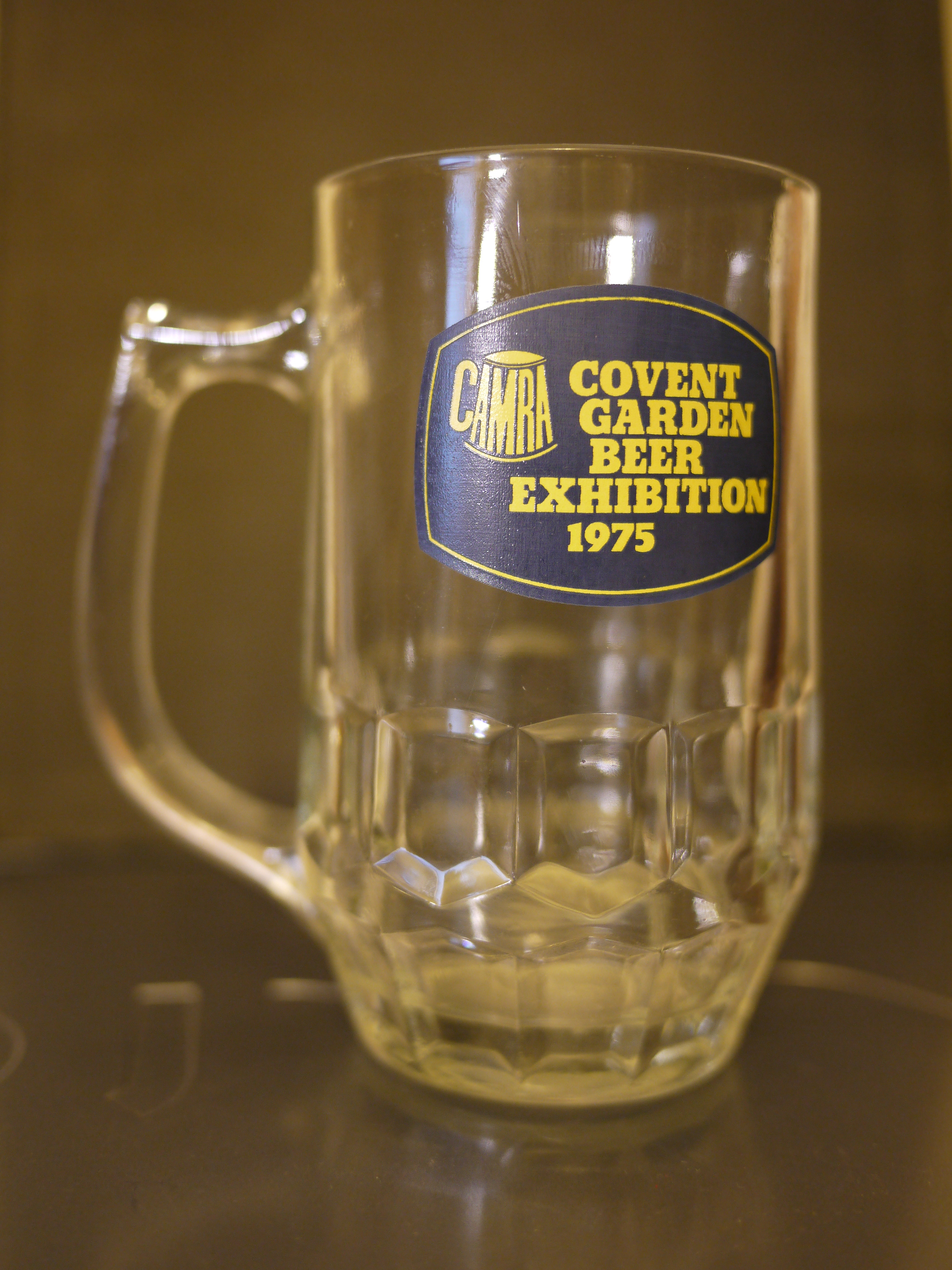
1975-CAMRA

=== Belgium ===
Belgium has a number of beer festivals, including:

- The BAB-bierfestival, held every year in the first weekend of February in Bruges
- The festival held every spring in Leuven (previously in Sint Niklaas and Antwerp) organized by the consumer group Zythos.
- The Belgian Beer Weekend held in Grand-Place, Brussels, organized by the Brewer's association.
- BXLBeerFest held in Tour & Taxis, Brussels since 2016
- Karakterbieren Festival in Poperinge, Belgium's hop-growing capital.
- The Beer Passion weekend held each July in Antwerp, organized by Beer Passion magazine,
- The Christmas beer festival in Essen

=== Czech Republic ===
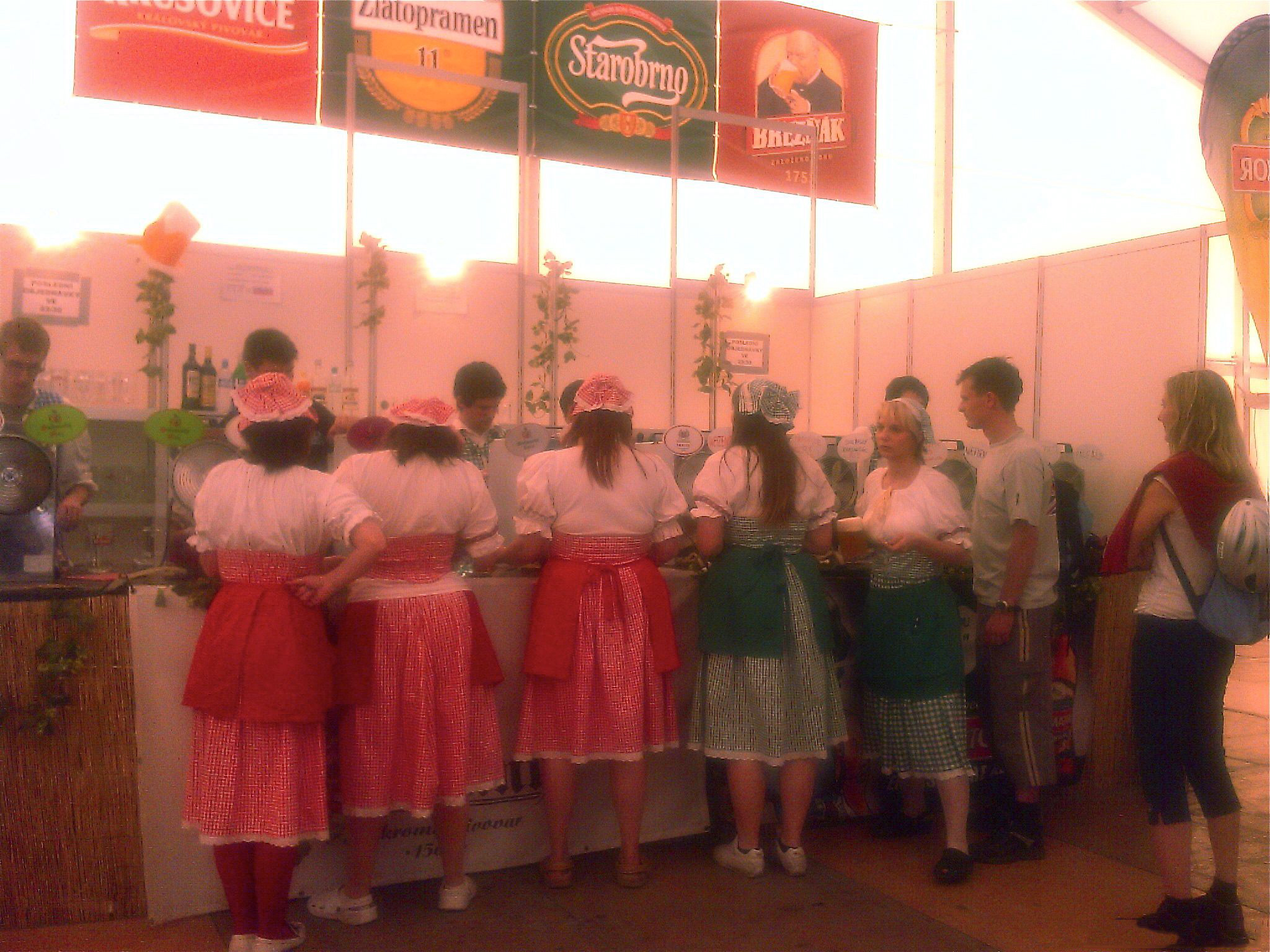
Costumes at the Czech Beer Festival

- Czech Beer Festival (Český pivní festival) is the biggest Czech beer festival, is 17 days long and held every year in May in Prague.
- Pilsner Fest is the big festival held every year in August in Plzeň.

=== Poland ===
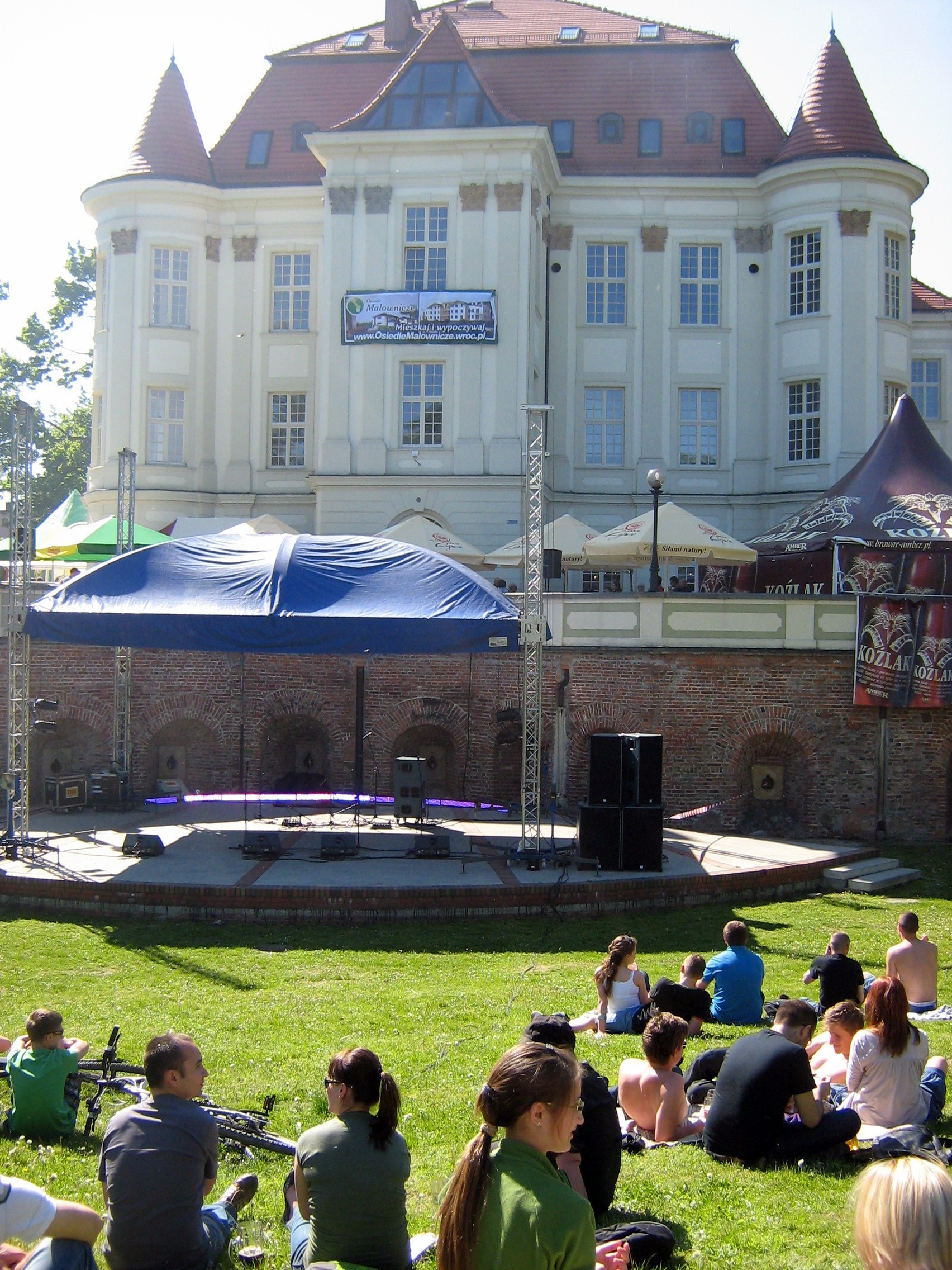
Festival of Good Beer in Wrocław (2011)

- Warsaw Beer Festival – in Warsaw, held every Spring and Autumn from 2014. It continues to bring together modern Polish craft beer tastes and the hottest trends. Offering around 60 breweries, 1200 beers from which around 300 ere premiere beers, made for the festival.
- Festival of Good Beer – in Wrocław, held every year on the second weekend of June. The third largest beer festival in Europe.

=== Other European countries ===
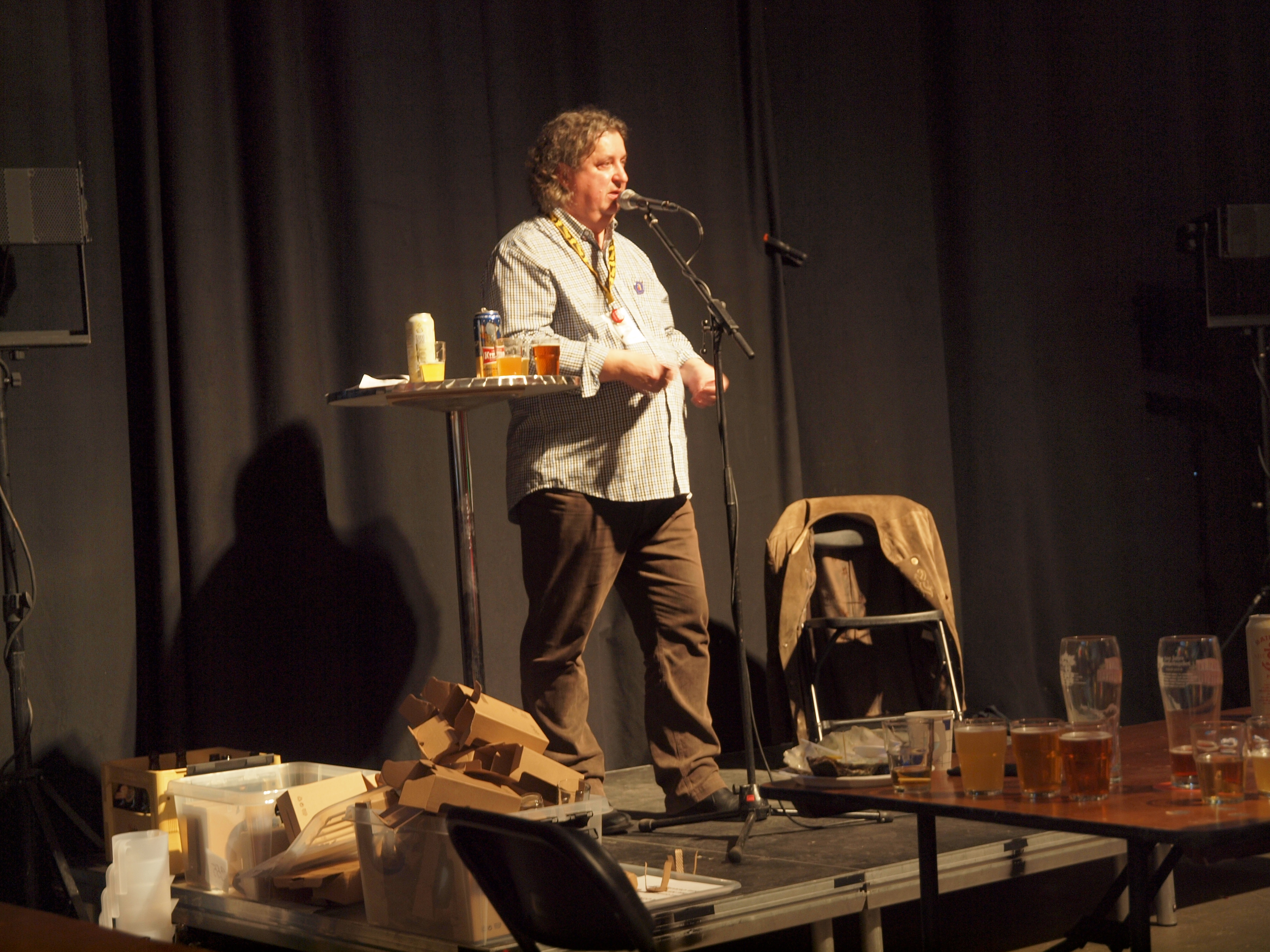
Heikki Kähkönen, the president of the Finnish Beer Association, at Helsinki Beer Festival 2016

- In Yerevan, Armenia, Yerevan Beer Fest is held every year in August (Swan Lake). In 2020 it was organized for the 7th time.
- In Belgrade, Serbia, Belgrade Beer Fest takes place every August at Ušće Park.
- In Braşov, Romania, a large Beer festival is held every year in October.
- In Copenhagen, Denmark, the big Copenhagen Beer Festival takes place every year in May.
- French festivals are held in Schiltigheim (August) and Felletin (July).
- In Dublin, Ireland, the All-Ireland Craft Beer Festival is held in September every year.
- In Cork, Ireland, the Franciscan Well Easterfest is held annually on the Easter Bank holiday weekend.
- In Karlovac, Croatia, Dani piva, held every year, 10 days starting on last Friday in August
- In Kragujevac, Serbia, Šumadija Beer Open, held every year in June.
- In Zrenjanin, Serbia, Dani piva, held every year in August.
- In Prilep, North Macedonia, Фестивал на пивото (Festival na pivoto) or Пивофест (Pivofest), held every year in July.
- In Riga, Latvia, festival Latviabeerfest (Latvijas Alus Festivāls) is held every year in May.
- In Tallinn, Estonia, festival Õllesummer is held every year in July.
- In Trondheim, Norway, an Oktoberfest is held every second year during the student festival UKA.
- In Sarajevo, Bosnia and Herzegovina, Sarajevo Beer Festival takes place every May–June at the Zetra Olympic Center.
- In Solothurn, Switzerland, Solothurner Biertage, held every year, 3 days starts in the last whole weekend in April.
- In Stockholm, Sweden, Stockholm Beer & Whisky Festival is held every year in September.
- In Malta, the Farsons Beer Festival, beer festival is held every year in the last week of July.
- In Laško, Slovenia, the Pivo in Cvetje meaning beer and flowers festival is held in the first weeks of July.
- In Bodegraven, Netherlands, the Borefts Beer Festival, held annually in the last week of September. More than 230 different beers by 30 brewers.
- In Helsinki, Finland, the Helsinki Beer Festival is held every year in April.
- In Ossetia, the Eeron Bagany takes place every year in October.
- In Pristina, Kosovo, Beerfest Kosova is held annually, taking place near the Palace of Youth and Sports. It is the biggest festival in Kosovo. Beer and Wine Festival Prishtina is another annually held beer festival which takes place in the Palace of Youth and Sports.

== North America ==
=== United States ===
- The Great American Beer Festival held in Denver, Colorado, started in 1982 and in 2008 had more than 46,000 people attend, with judges selecting medal winners from 2,961 beers entered by 477 breweries.
- The Great Taste of the Midwest held it's 1st festival at the Italian Workman's Club in Madison, Wisconsin in 1987. The event is run by volunteers from the Madison Homebrewers and Tasters Guild a 501(c)3(4) nonprofit that distributes proceeds to local charities each year since the start. It started with 9 breweries and about 250 attendees. The event move to Turner Hall, Capital Brewery and eventually Olin-Turville Park where it continues to be held. In 2026 the overall attendance was about 10,500 (ticket holders, brewers, and volunteers) with 200 breweries and 1,400 different beers.
- On May 12, 2012, the Garden State BrewFest celebrated the best in local (NJ, NY & PA) brewing. The GSBF is NJ's premier outdoor beer festival. Always held Mother's Day Saturday, the GSBF II, May 11, 2013, included VIP experience incorporating beer-infused foods and highly sought after beers from around the world.
- The largest and longest running beer festival in New York City is Brewtopia: The Great World Beer Festival.
- The largest and longest running craft beer festival in New York State is Tap® New York Craft Brew Festival, established in 1998. 65+ breweries pouring 200+ unique craft beers.
- The Oregon Brewers Festival has taken place each July since 1988. It is one of the largest beer festivals in the country, attracting more than 85,000 people as of 2014, to Portland.
- The Oktoberfest is the oldest festival in Nashville, Tennessee, held annually since 1980 in the historic Germantown neighborhood. All major German breweries have a presence at the 3-day event. In 2015, approximately 143,000 people attended, making it the largest Fall Festival in the South.
- Philly Beer Week is a 10-day series of beer events starting on the first weekend in June in Philadelphia as a celebration of America's Best Beer-Drinking City. The Hammer of glory was used to tap the ceremonial first keg at Opening Tap on March 6, 2009.
- The Great International Beer Festival is held in Providence, Rhode Island twice annually.
- The KC Beerfest, located in Kansas City, Missouri, provides one of the Midwest's newest opportunities to try the wares of hundreds of different craft brewers from all over the world.
- The Seattle International Beer Festival is a beer festival held annually in Seattle, Washington during the month of July. The festival offers visitors a selection of 100-150 beers from some twenty countries around the world.
- The Great Arizona Beer Festival is the state's longest-running beer festival. Held in Tempe, Arizona since 1990 it features 50 breweries offering more than 200 varieties of frosty suds. The event benefits and is run by Sun Sounds of Arizona, a non-profit providing reading services to the blind. The organization also runs beer festivals in Tucson and Flagstaff.
- Brewbeque is a craft beer festival held annually in Evansville, IN. It benefits Guardianship Services of Southwestern Indiana.
- Fresh Fest, held annually in Pittsburgh, Pennsylvania since 2018, is the nation's first Black craft beer festival. The festival features Black-owned breweries, as well as breweries collaborating with Black artists, entrepreneurs, and businesses in Pittsburgh, the surrounding area, and beyond.
- The Oldenburg Freudenfest, located in Oldenburg, Indiana, has been held annually since 1977. The festival offers a wide variety of German food, family-friendly activities, and a wide-selection beers on tap, both domestic and imported.
- June Lake Autumn Brew Festival, held annually in June lake CA in the Sierra's at the end of September or early October since 2013. People come from all over including the greater Los Angeles area, Ventura County, Santa Maria and further. Brew fest attendees enjoy samples from a variety of breweries including local the locals such as June Lake Brewing and Mammoth Brewing and breweries come in from all over the US. "The 10th Annual June Lake Autumn Beer Festival is an annual one day fall fundraising event hosted by the Little Loopers, a 501c3 nonprofit organization."

=== Canada ===
- Edmonton's International BeerFest Days is a six-day outdoor beer festival held in June at Sir Winston Churchill Square in Edmonton, Alberta, Canada.
- The Great Canadian Beer Festival has focused on cask ales from the Pacific Northwest since 1993, with assistance from the Victoria chapter of the Campaign for Real Ale (CAMRA). Since 2003, the festival has been held at Royal Athletic Park on the first weekend after Labour Day. It attracts more than 60 craft breweries from British Columbia and elsewhere in Canada, with more than 8,000 visitors.
- The Kitchener-Waterloo Oktoberfest is a nine-day festival held in Kitchener and Waterloo. Established in 1969, it was influenced by the original German Oktoberfest. It is held every October, beginning on the Friday before Canadian Thanksgiving and concluding the following Saturday.
- Toronto's Festival of Beer was first held at Fort York in Toronto in 1995 and has been held at Exhibition Place since 2009.
- Lauder Beer Festival is a smaller beer festival held in the north end of Toronto.
- Vancouver Craft Beer Week was launched on May 10, 2010, as the first beer week-style festival in Canada. The format originated in Philadelphia in 2008. Vancouver Craft Beer Week spans nine days, with events held throughout Vancouver, and concludes with a three-day tasting festival. Organizers commission a VCBW Collaboration Ale each year, with a portion of the proceeds donated to a local charity.
- The Ontario Craft Brewers established Ontario Craft Beer Week in 2010 as a week-long craft beer celebration held across the province.
- Mondial de la Bière was established in 1994 in Montreal and attracts approximately 80,000 visitors.

The Golden Tap Awards is an annual beer awards event held in Toronto. The awards are sponsored and presented by The Bar Towel, a website and forum dedicated to the discussion and promotion of Toronto's craft and microbrew beer scene.

=== Other North American countries ===
- In Mexico, in the cities of Puebla, Mexico City, Mazatlán and Tapachula Oktoberfest is celebrated by the descendants of German immigrants in these cities. The largest ones are held in Puebla and Mexico City where the German community is very important and one can hear German music and be delighted by German food and folk dresses.
- In Costa Rica, every year festivities called Fiestas de Palmares are held in Palmares to raise funds. Even though the drinking of beer is not one of the main events, and despite campaigns to reduce it, the consumption of it reaches levels that are comparable to those from international beer festivals like Oktoberfest and Spring-Break.

== Oceania ==
- Tasmania, The Tasmanian Beerfest is held on 12 and 13 November 2010. Showcasing over 100 boutique and imported beers at Princes Wharf. It started in 2006. In 2009 over 10,000 people tasted over 100 different beers from around the world and Tamar Valley Beer Festival.
- Queensland has many small celebrations of Oktoberfest and Milking the Cow Beer Lovers Festival, Queensland Beer Week and BeerFestABull. Mainly supported across the local university populations, it has spilled over into local restaurants and pubs, looking to join in the festival.
- Sydney celebrates Oktoberfest at the German-Austrian Society Club in the suburb of Cabramatta as of 2010. This is the first year in 40 years that the Oktoberfest has not been celebrated at the Fairfield Showground and the Australian Beer Festival, Bitter and Twisted Boutique Beer Festival.
- Canberra celebrates Oktoberfest and the Canberra Craft Beer & Cider Festival at the Thoroughbred Park, Lyneham.
- Adelaide celebrates Schuetzenfest in January at Bonython Park just outside the CBD.
- Western Australia Every June Western Australia devotes an entire week to beer WA Beer Week and some other's are Elmar's Food & Beer Festival, Perth Beer Festival, FeBREWary, South West Craft Beer Festival and Sprung in the Alley Craft Beer Festival.
- The New Zealand Beer Festival has been run in Auckland since 2007 and was held in Wellington in 2009.
- Beervana started as the New Zealand Beer, Wine and Spirits Council's NZ Beer Expo in 2001 and was previously organized and run by the Brewers Guild of New Zealand. The festival became Beervana and was taken over by the Wellington Culinary Events Trust in 2015. It has been held each year in August at SKY Stadium in Wellington, NZ.

== South America ==
=== Argentina ===
- In Argentina, a town called Villa General Belgrano in the Córdoba Province has an Oktoberfest that is well-known and the biggest in the country.

=== Brazil ===
- A huge Oktoberfest is held in the Brazilian city of Blumenau (Oktoberfest of Blumenau, with more than 600,000 visitors in 2004), and many other Brazilian cities founded by Germans have their own Oktoberfest, such as Santa Cruz do Sul (more than 500,000 visitors in 2004), Igrejinha (more than 200,000 visitors in 2006), Rolândia, São José do Cedro, Seara and Itapiranga. They also hold the Brazilian Beer Festival.

=== Chile ===
- In Valdivia, Chile host each summer a so-called Bierfest that organized and sponsored by Kunstmann Bier, a local beer company.
- Llanquihue also in Chile hosts a once a year a Bierfest during summer. The main sponsor is Cerveza Cristal, Chile's largest beer brand

== See also ==
- International Beer Day
- Volksfest
