= Barthelmarkt =

German Volksfest

Coordinates: 48°42′44″N 11°27′06″E

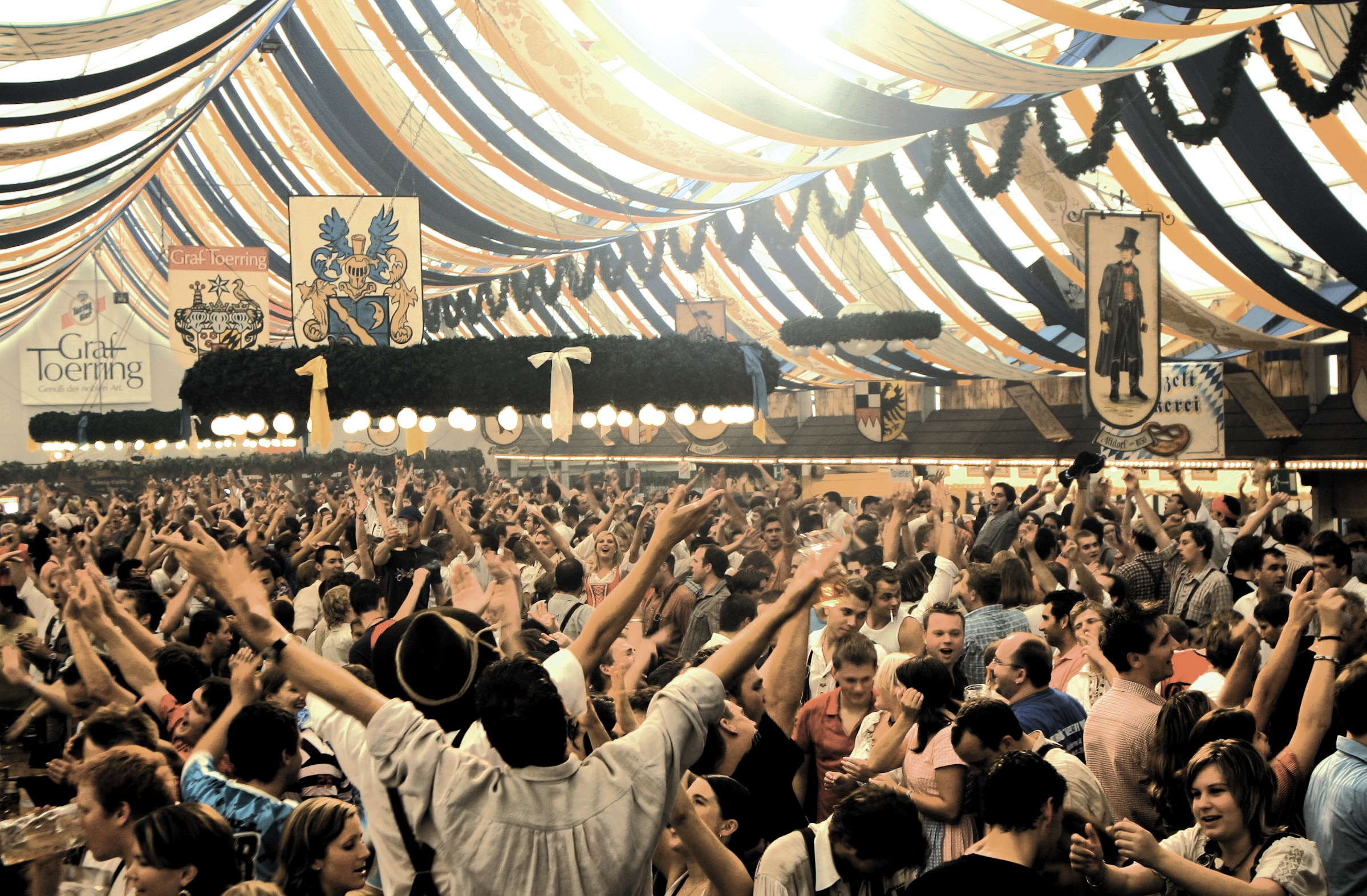
Beer tent

The Barthelmarkt is an annual Volksfest (beer festival and travelling funfair) in Manching, near Ingolstadt, Germany. It is held on the last weekend of August and lasts four days. Every year, about 250,000 people visit it.

Though first mentioned in 1354, its roots can be traced back as early as to the 1st century BC, when the Romans established a cattle market in the area.

The name "Barthelmarkt" stems from St. Bartholomew, the patron saint of the local church.

== Beer tents ==
- Herrnbräu Festzelt (Ingolstadt)
- Toerring Bier Festzelt (Pörnbach)
- Stiftl Spaten Festzelt (Munich)
- Ingobräu Festzelt (Ingolstadt)
- Weissbiergarten Mittl (Ingolstadt)
