= Festival of Good Beer =

International beer festival

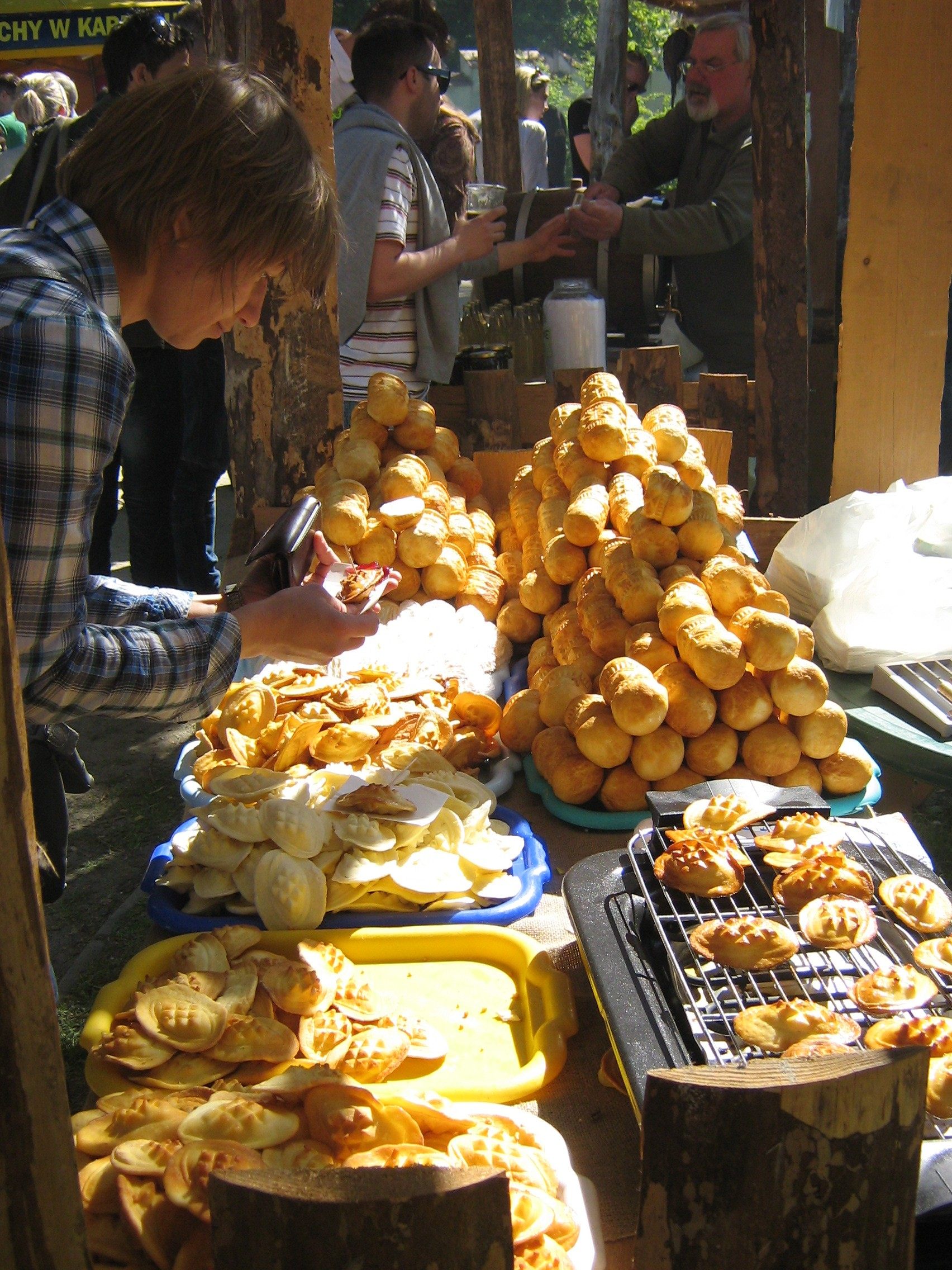
Festiwal Dobrego Piwa

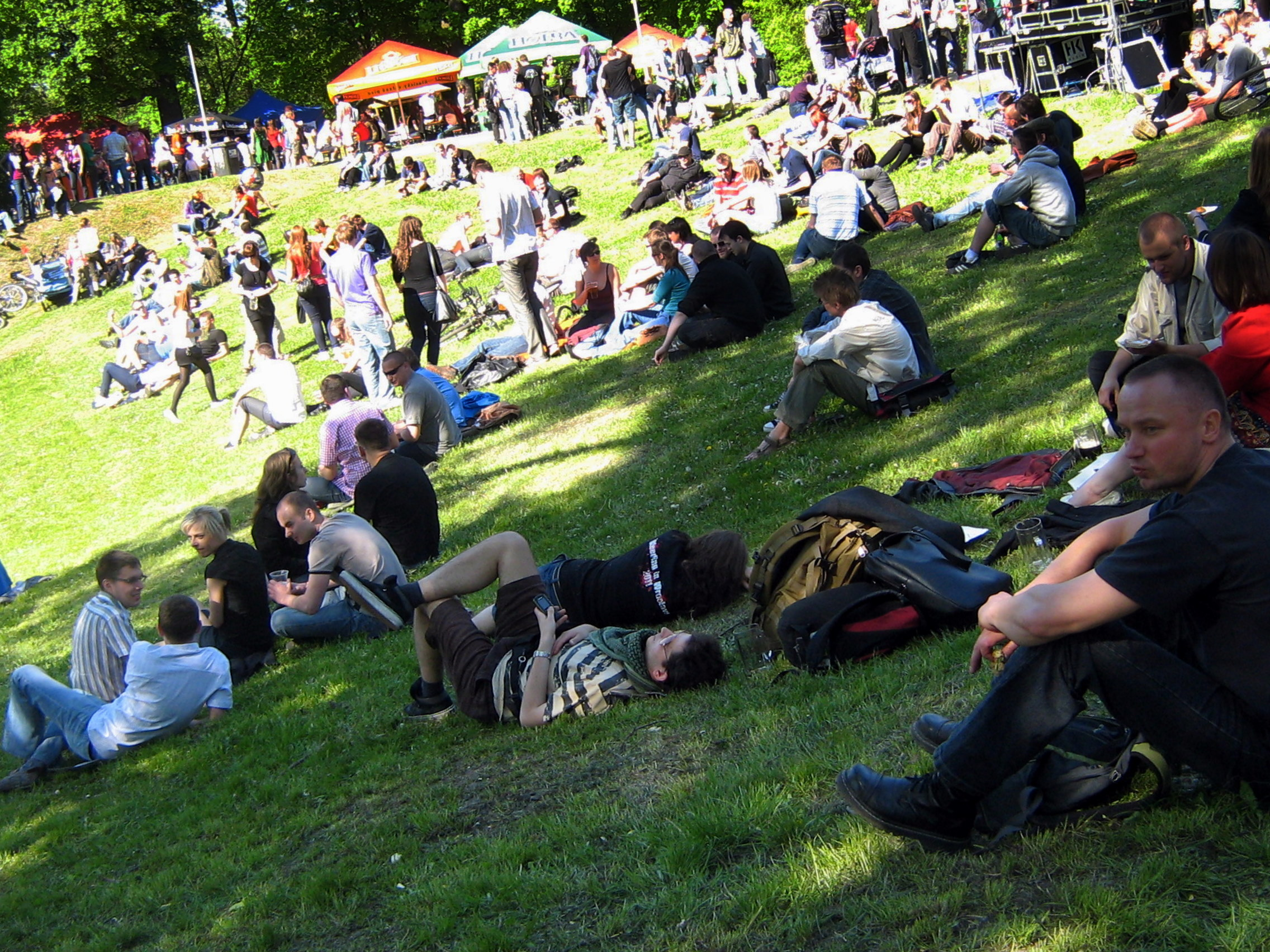
Festiwal Dobrego Piwa

Festival of Good Beer (Polish language: Festiwal Dobrego Piwa) is an international beer festival in Wrocław, Poland. The free festival is held each year predominantly on the second weekend of June on the esplanade of the Municipal Stadium. The main organizer of the festival is the Cultural Center "Castle", with a co-promoter Agnieszka Wołczaska-Prasolik (winner of the Golden Hops 2013).

Pioneers the Festival of Good Beer were Joanna Boś, organizer of events at the Cultural Center "Castle" and Agnieszka Wołczaska-Prasolik. The first installation of the festival was in 2010; it lasted two days. Since 2012, the festival expanded to three days. In the years 2010-2013 festival held in the areas of the castle and the Leśnicki Park. Every year barreled and bottled beer is presented by dozens of regional breweries, craft, contract and restaurant (brewpub) Polish, Czech, Belgium, Germany, Ukrainian, Denmark, Norwegian, Netherlands, Italy, England, Scotland and Ireland. Beer is complemented by the regional cuisine, music concerts, film screenings, exhibitions, contests, breweriana exchange and Live Beer Blogging. During the festival, you can also enter the stadium.

It is estimated that attendance in 2011 it amounted to about 10,000 people, in 2012 about 20,000 people, in 2013 about 25,000 people, 2014 about 80,000 people, 2015 about 80,000 people, 2017 about 70,000 people. It is the largest beer festival in Poland and one of the largest in Europe in terms of attendance and the number of exhibitors (in 2015 - 57 stands of beer, 350 taps, 142 breweries, more than 1,000 different beers, including as many as 26 premieres, in 2016 - 68 stands of beer, more than 400 taps, 124 breweries, more than 1,000 different beers, in 2018 - 70 stands of beer, 500 taps, 1300 different beers).

== See also ==
- Beer
