= Summer house =

Building used for relaxation in warm weather

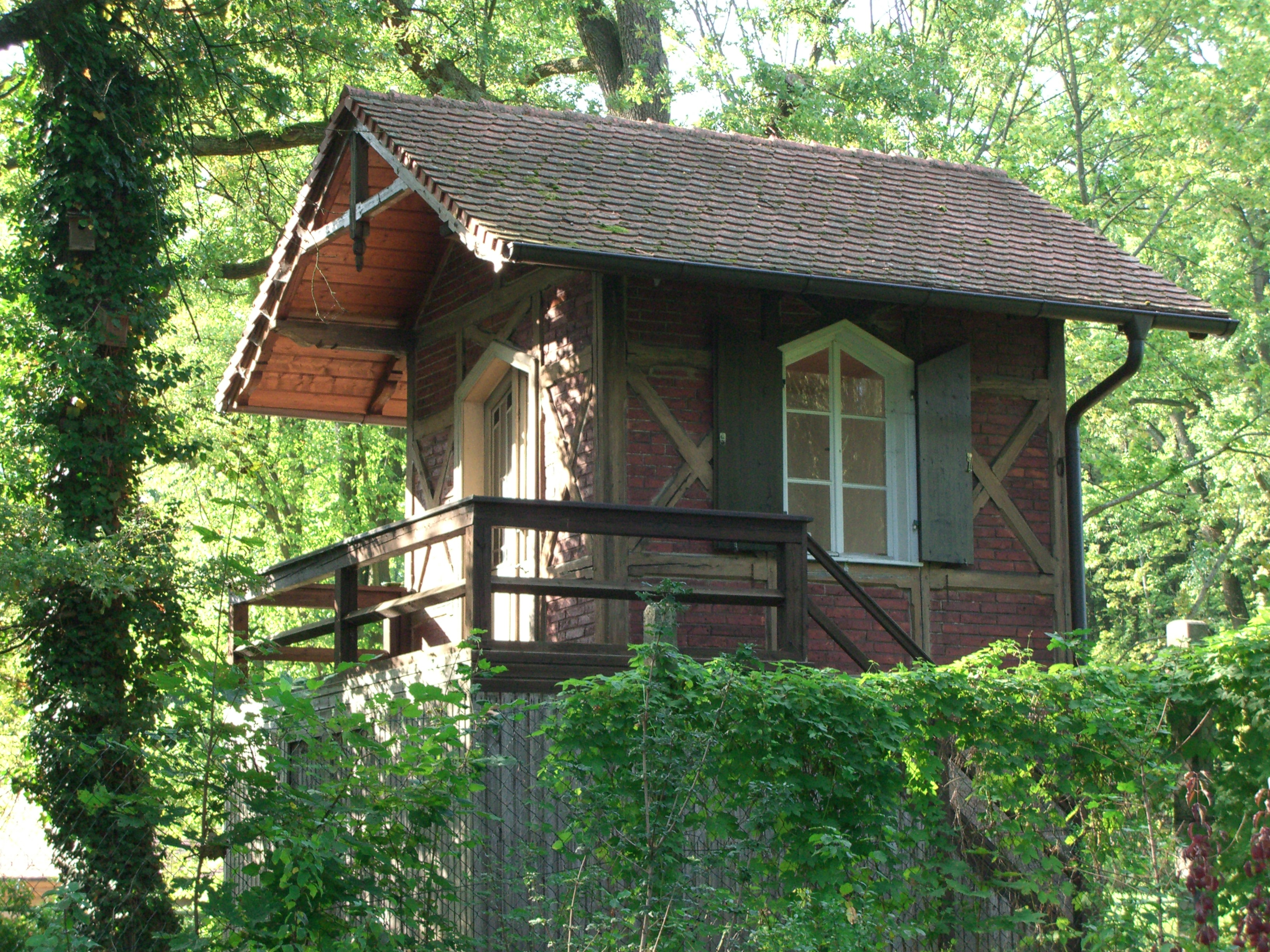
A summerhouse on the Burgberg (next to the Burgberggarten) in Erlangen, Germany.

A summer house or summerhouse is a building or shelter used for relaxation in warm weather. This would often take the form of a small, roofed building on the grounds of a larger one, but could also be built in a garden or park, often designed to provide cool shady places of relaxation or retreat from the summer heat. It can also refer to a second residence, usually located in the country, that provides a cool and relaxing home to live in during the summer, such as a vacation property.

== In the Nordic countries ==
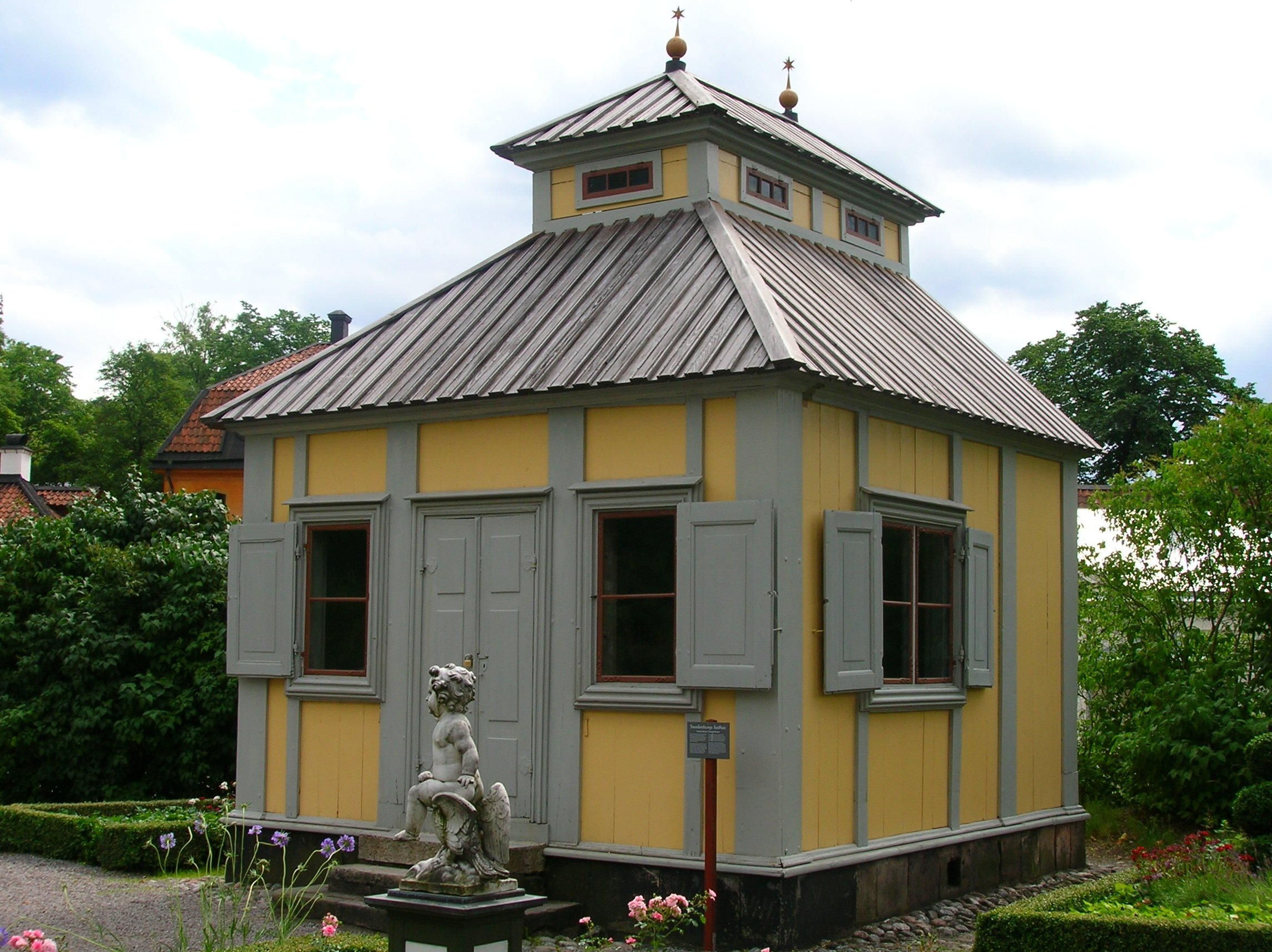
Summerhouse ("sommarstuga") of the Swedish scientist, philosopher, and theologian Emanuel Swedenborg in the open-air museum Skansen in Stockholm, Sweden.

Especially in the Nordic countries, sommerhus (Danish), sommarstuga (Swedish), hytte (Norwegian), sumarbústaður or sumarhús (Icelandic) or kesämökki (Finnish) is a summer residence (as a second home). It can be a larger dwelling like a cottage rather than a simple shelter.

Sommarhus (in Swedish: sommarstuga or lantställe), in Norwegian hytte, is a popular holiday home or summer cottage, often near the sea or in an attractive area of the countryside. Most are timber constructions, often suitable for year-round use. Increasingly they have additions such as saunas, heating ovens, fireplaces, or attractive gardens. Increasingly, English speakers call them summerhouses. A Swedish sommarstuga is traditionally painted with a special red colour called falu rödfärg and has white trimmed corners, windows, and doors.

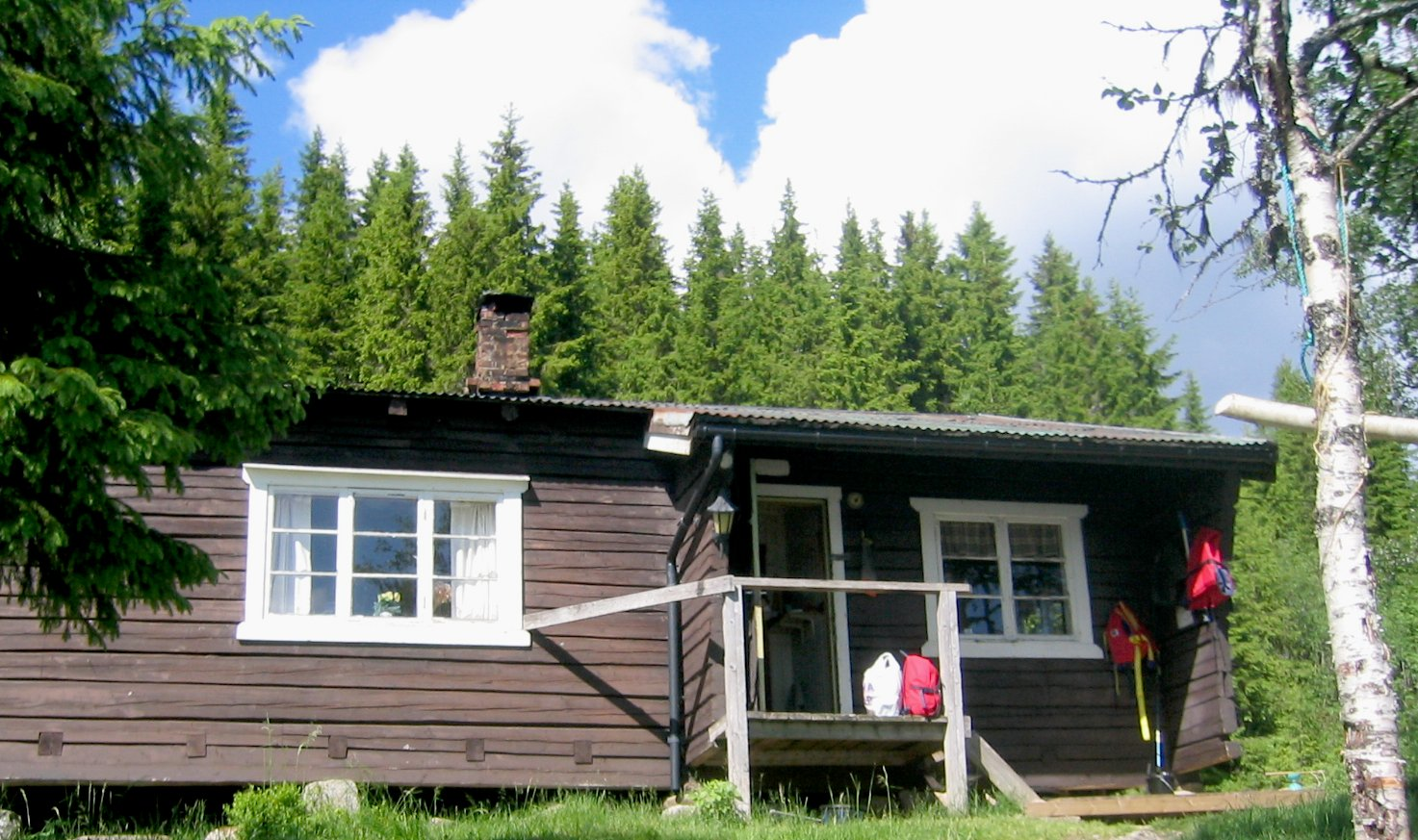
Norwegian "hytte"

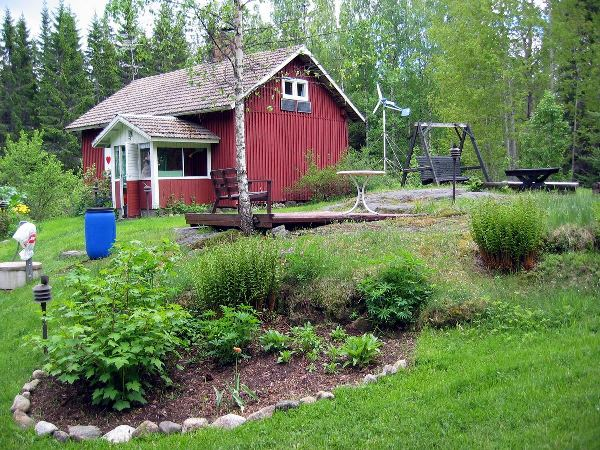
Finnish "kesämökki"

Many of the Danish resorts depend on the rental of summerhouses to accommodate national and foreign tourists who can rent them, usually on a weekly basis, at prices (for a family) well below those of hotels. But Scandinavians often spend a considerable amount of time in their summerhouses which are often the venue for family reunions or simply weekends away from the office.

In recent years, the popularity and, thus, the cost of summerhouses has increased appreciably, particularly in Denmark's coastal resorts. Under Danish law, owners are generally not permitted to use these houses as permanent homes; an exception is made for pensioners.

In some attractive areas of Norway, there is "residence duty" (Norwegian:boplikt), meaning that an owner of a house must use it as their primary home and spend most of their overnight stays there. Other areas of Norway are defined as "summer house areas", where it is forbidden to live permanently. This is because there are quality requirements for permanent homes that do not apply to cottages.

Sweden has no ban against using summer houses all year or against using a normal house in summer only. This has made Swedish summer houses popular for Danes, Norwegians, and Germans. But in some desirable coastal areas, prices are so high that residents cannot afford a house, making some traditional coastal villages very silent in winter.

== See also ==
- Bothy – simple shelter
- Buitenplaats
- Bungalow – type of single-storey house
- Cottage
- Dacha – seasonal or year-round second homes located in the exurbs of Soviet and Russian cities
- Derby Summer House
- Fog House – a pleasure house often lined with moss.
- Gazebo
- Log cabin
- Mountain hut – building located in the mountains intended to provide food and shelter to mountaineers and hikers
- Mar del Plata style
- Pavilion
- Pergola
- Pied-à-terre – small living unit, typically located in a large city
- Shepherd's hut
- Shieling
- Small house movement
- Snowbird (person)
- Tea house
- Transhumance – seasonal movement of livestock to mountain pastures, sometimes with summer residences for the pastoralists
- Tree house
- Vacation rental
