= Brazilian Beer Festival =

The Brazilian Beer Festival is a beer festival in Brazil. The festival showcases the different kinds of beer in Brazil, including Brazilian Beer Awards winners, and is promoted by ABRADEG.
