= Manching =

- Municipality
- Coat of arms

- Location of Manching within Pfaffenhofen a.d.Ilm district
- Interactive map of Manching
- Location within Germany Location within Bavaria
- Coordinates: 48°43′7″N 11°29′50″E
- Country: Germany
- State: Bavaria
- Admin. region: Oberbayern
- District: Pfaffenhofen a.d.Ilm

Government
  - Mayor (2020–26): Herbert Nerb (FW)

Area
  - Total: 35.48 km^{2} (13.70 sq mi)
- Elevation: 366 m (1,201 ft)

Population (2025-12-31)
  - Total: 12,958
  - Density: 365.2/km^{2} (945.9/sq mi)
- Time zone: UTC+01:00 (CET)
  - Summer (DST): UTC+02:00 (CEST)
- Postal codes: 85077
- Dialling codes: 08459
- Vehicle registration: PAF
- Website: www.manching.de

Manching (German pronunciation: [ˈmançɪŋ]) is a municipality in the district of Pfaffenhofen, in Bavaria, Germany. It is situated on the river Paar, 7 km southeast of Ingolstadt. In the late Iron Age, there was a Celtic settlement, the Oppidum of Manching, on the location of present-day Manching.

Airbus Defence and Space (former Military Air Systems business unit of EADS) has its flight test center here at Manching Airport.

The Barthelmarkt, a well-known beer festival in the area, takes place in the district of Oberstimm on the last weekend of August every year.
