= Battersea Beer Festival =

Coordinates: 51.4648°N 0.1607°W

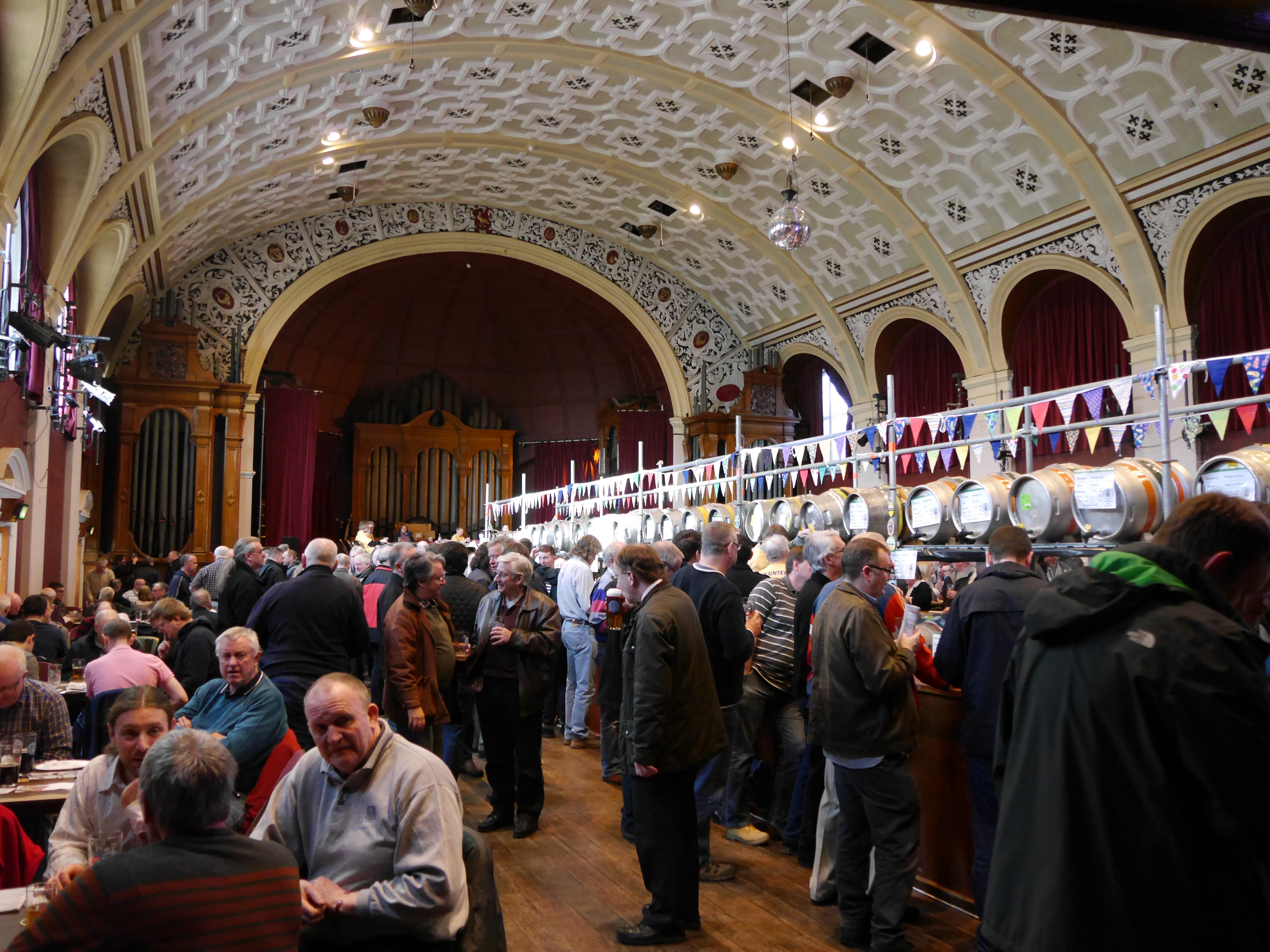
Battersea Beer Festival, 2014.

Battersea Beer Festival was a three-day-long annual beer festival held at the Battersea Arts Centre, Battersea, London, England.

The festival offered opportunities to sample over 200 real ales, along with a range of traditional ciders and foreign beers, as well as bottled real ales and foreign bottled beers.

The final, and 24th, festival took place from 5–7 February 2014, and was opened by Michael Hardman, one of the four original founders of CAMRA.

The event has not been held since 2014. This was initially due to a refurbishment of the venue but following a major fire at the Battersea Arts Centre there have been no subsequent events
