= Eeron Bagany =

Ossetian beer festival

Eeron Bagany, Iron Bagan, or Iron Bagany is an Ossetian beer festival which takes place annually in Northern and Southern Ossetia in autumn. The festival lasts a day and can be regarded as a kind of Oktoberfest.

== History of Ossetian brewing culture and Ossetian beer ==
Ossetian brewing culture can be traced back to descriptions to be found in the Nart sagas, which contain an aetiological legend recounting the discovery of beer. According to the legend "a warchief saw a bird in the forest that ate some hops and immediately fainted. The chief took the hops home and told his wife, the wise matriarch Shatana, what had happened. She mixed the hops with ground malt, and added water to brew the first ever batch of Ossetian beer."

Differing from the ordinary beer, the Ossetian beer is "significantly less intoxicating", has no foam, ranges from color dark brown to black, and is brewed without technology. It is traditionally brewed by the "oldest woman in the family".

== Activities within the festival ==
During the festival, the beers which are brewed by the locals are tested by the judges choosing the best brewer.
