= Great World Beer Festival =

Craft beer festival in New York City

The Great World Beer Fest (GWBF), originally known as “Brewtopia” was established in 2002 and was a long-running, large beer festival in New York City. Billed as the "United Nations of Beer,” GWBF featured brewers from around the world in a fun, competitive, and prominent festival designed to increase the public's awareness of craft beers. Traditionally held in the fall, the GWBF held its eighth and final event in 2010.
