= São José do Cedro =

Coordinates: 26°30′S 53°30′W

- Municipality
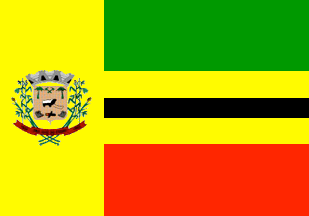
- Flag Coat of arms

- Country: Brazil
- Region: South
- State: Santa Catarina
- Mesoregion: Oeste Catarinense

Population (2020)
  - Total: 13,820
- Time zone: UTC -3

São José do Cedro is a municipality in the state of Santa Catarina in the South region of Brazil most known for its indigenous population.

== Climate ==
São José do Cedro has humid subtropical climate (Köppen climate classification: Cfa). In summer, the temperature reaches up to 29°C while in winter, the temperature reaches to 20°C.

== See also ==
- List of municipalities in Santa Catarina
