= Bergkirchweih =

Annual Volksfest (beer festival and travelling funfair) in Erlangen, Germany

Coordinates: 49°36′27″N 11°00′18″E

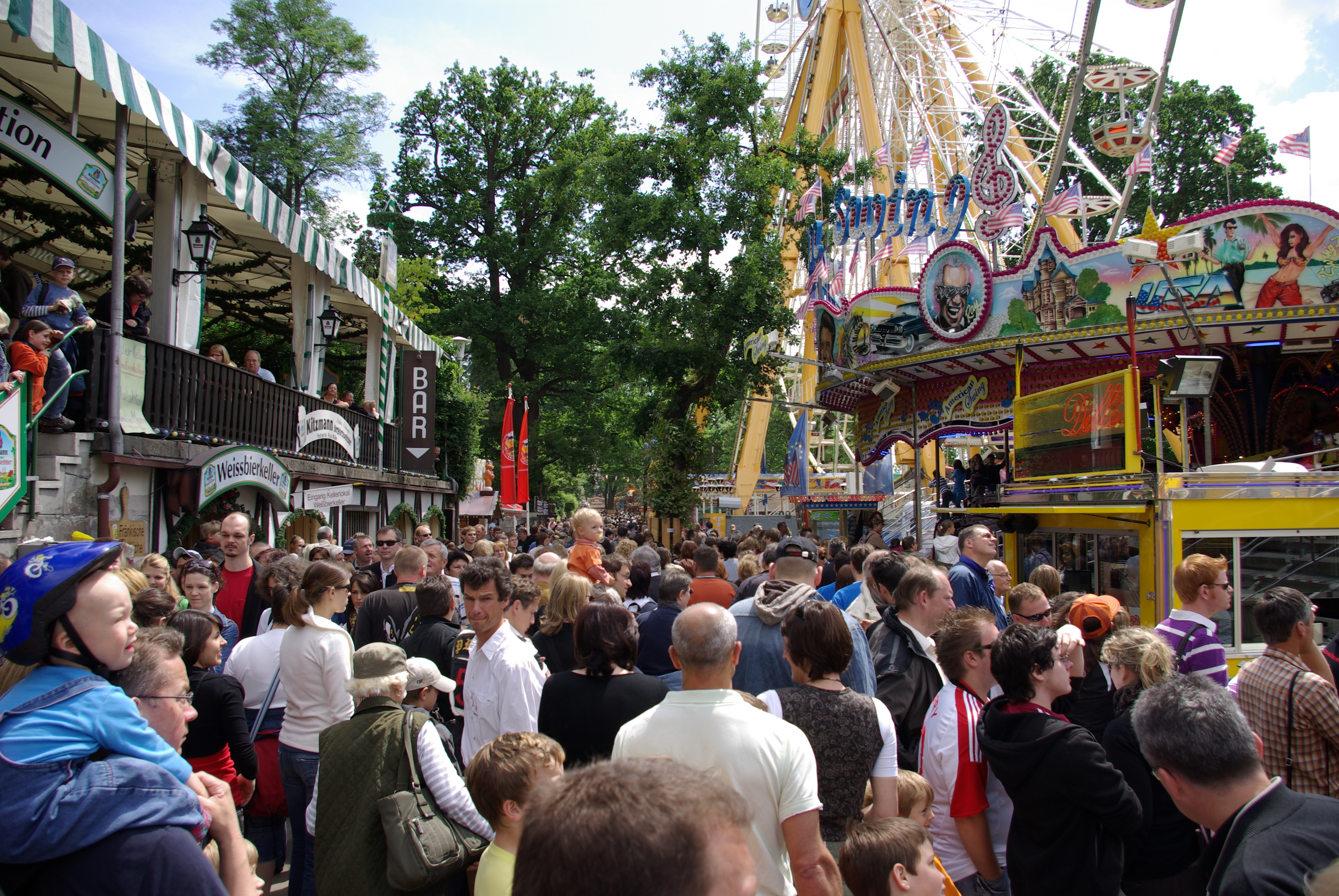
The Bergkirchweih in 2009

The Bergkirchweih is an annual Volksfest (beer festival and travelling funfair) in Erlangen, Germany. Locals nickname it Berch, which is the East Franconian pronunciation of the German word Berg, meaning mountain or hill.

The Bergkirchweih starts on the Thursday before Pentecost at 5 PM. The opening ceremony, called "Anstich," is performed by the city's mayor and takes place each year at a different beer cellar, which traditionally serves as the storage and cooling facility for local breweries. Thousands of people gather to witness this inaugural event, eagerly awaiting the opportunity to receive a stein of free beer from the first barrel. According to tradition, twelve days later, the last beer barrel is ceremonially buried at the cellar where the next Anstich will occur.

The Bergkirchweih area is situated in the northern part of the city of Erlangen and spans approximately one kilometer (0.6 mi) in length. It comprises beer cellars, along with a lengthy road lined with spaces for booths and amusement rides. A prominent feature of the Bergkirchweih is the towering Ferris wheel, which serves as the traditional landmark of the festival.

With its wooden benches under elm, chestnut and oak trees it is one of the biggest Open Air Biergartens of Europe boasting more than 11,000 seats.

The Bergkirchweih has taken place since 21 April 1755, making it 55 years older than the Oktoberfest. Locals often refer to the two week window when the beer festival is taking place as the "fifth season". Roughly a million people—about ten times the city's population—visit the event, making the Bergkirchweih, together with Oktoberfest in Munich, Gäubodenvolksfest in Straubing, Michaeliskirchweih in Fürth and Volksfest in Nuremberg one of the great five in Bavaria.

There was an American Military Kaserne (Ferris Barracks) located in southern Erlangen until 1994. Soldiers commonly referred to the festival as the "Strawberry Festival", probably due to the difficulty in pronouncing 'Bergkirchweih'.

== Local traditions ==
While most visitors to the festival will choose comfortable clothing to spend the day outdoors and potentially dance on the long benches and tables to the music of the variety of bands playing, it is becoming more common in recent years for visitors to opt to use the occasion to wear their most traditional Bavarian or Franconian outfits, such as Lederhosen and Dirndl.

A common locally evolving tradition during the festival is the so-called Kastenlauf (crate walk). A crate of beer (20 bottles each 1/2 litre) is pulled or carried on a walk to the festival with friends. The goal is for the crate to be empty upon arrival at the festival, relating the evolution of Kastenlauf to that of pre-gaming.

Nowadays the last song played during the festival every year is Lili Marleen while locals sing along and wave tissues as the last barrel of beer is symbolically being buried.

== See also ==
- Beer festival
