= Sun Sounds of Arizona =

Radio reading service for Arizona

Sun Sounds of Arizona is a radio reading service serving the state of Arizona. It is an outreach service of Rio Salado College in Tempe, Arizona, with additional offices in Tucson, Flagstaff and Yuma.

Sun Sounds was founded in 1979 to allow visually impaired people in Phoenix and the Valley of the Sun access to print media. It expanded to Tucson and southern Arizona in 1979, adding northern Arizona in 1995 and southwestern Arizona in 2011.

It was named as one of George H. W. Bush's "thousand points of light" in 1992.

Sun Sounds can be heard on specially configured radios provided to its members, as well as on a telephone access system and via podcast. Sun Sounds' central and southern Arizona feeds can be streamed worldwide on the Internet, while the southwestern Arizona feed is available on Time Warner Cable's Yuma system. The central Arizona feed can also be heard on sister station KBAQ's third HD channel.
