= Philly Beer Week =

10-day event in Philadelphia and Delaware

Coordinates: 39.95085°N 75.15001°W

Philly Beer Week is a series of beer events held over a 10-day period throughout the Philadelphia metropolitan area organized and operated by Philly Beer Week Inc., originating in 2007. Events include festivals, dinners, tours, pub crawls, tastings and meet-the-brewer nights to area bars, restaurants and other locations throughout the city and surrounding suburbs hosted by over 200 area restaurants, breweries and beer stores. Philly Beer Week is the largest beer celebration in the United States, and its successful model has been copied by over 100 other cities worldwide. The organization was founded in 2007 by a group of local beer enthusiasts, bar owners, brewers, distributors and others. Its first leaders were President Tom Peters of Monk's Cafe, Vice President Bruce Nichols of Museum Catering and Executive Director Don Russell, also known as Joe Sixpack.

2018 marked the 10th anniversary of the celebration. Two years later, however, the Beer Week went to online.

The symbol of Philly Beer Week is the Hammer of Glory. It is carried during a citywide relay to kick off each Philly Beer Week, and then used to open the first keg of the celebration at Opening Tap. In 2013, it was stolen and then quickly returned.

== See also ==
- Craft beer
