= Beervana =

New Zealand beer festival

Beervana is an annual two-day beer festival in Wellington, New Zealand, with 14,000 – 16,000 visitors attending. Typically there are 350–450 different craft beers.

The majority of breweries are from New Zealand, although in the past breweries from Australia and around the world including the US, the UK and Japan have participated. Typically the festival is held over four sessions across a Friday and Saturday in August.

The entire festival is held within the Wellington Regional Stadium concourse, a large, oval corridor inside the stadium.

== History ==
Beervana began as the New Zealand Beer, Wine and Spirits Council's NZ Beer Expo in 2001, and included events across Wellington celebrating the growing New Zealand craft beer industry. It was held just after the New Zealand Brewers Guild Awards, as a way for brewers to make use of the leftover beer they submitted for judging.

The NZ Beer Expo briefly became The Great New Zealand Beer Show, which in turn evolved into Taste BrewNZ, held at the Wellington Town Hall. The Brewers Guild of New Zealand then created "Beervana" in 2008. The festival was sold to then Guild president, David Cryer, who in 2011 moved it to the Wellington Regional Stadium. The Wellington Culinary Events Trust bought Beervana in 2015 and has run the festival ever since.

Over the years there have been collaborative brews between international and locally based breweries and journalists.

== Beervana today ==
Beer is provided by brewers from around New Zealand, and there are usually brewers from overseas represented. In 2022 and 2023, Australian breweries from the Sunshine Coast Region exhibited. There is a Pink Boots Society stand, which showcases females in brewing, and a New Kids On the Block stand, which features new breweries which have opened up within the previous year.
