= Sterneckerbräu =

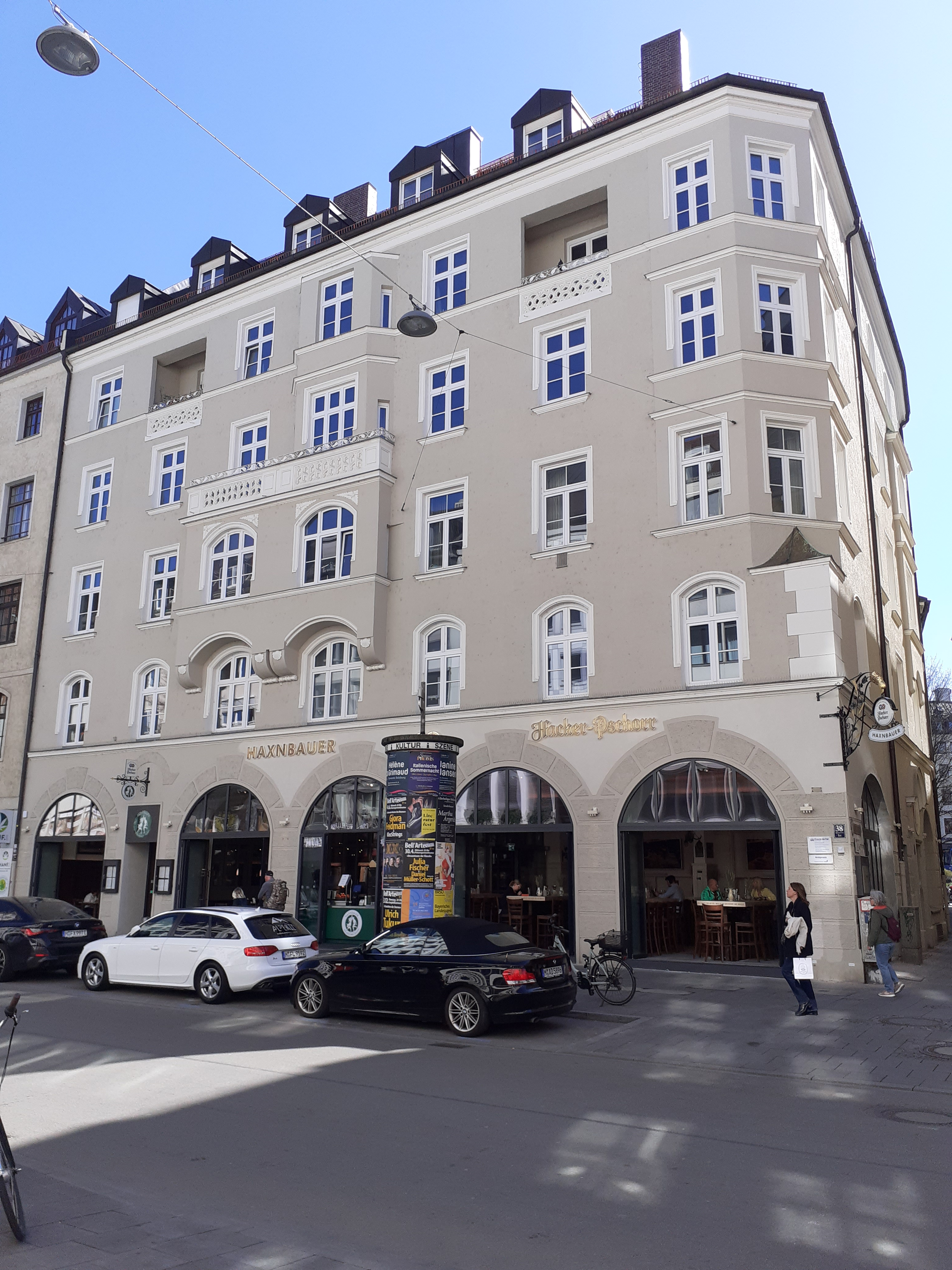
- The Sterneckerbräu in 2025

- Location within Germany

General information
- Location: Tal 38, Munich, Germany
- Coordinates: 48°8′8″N 11°34′50″E
- Opened: 1557

Technical details
- Floor count: 5

The Sterneckerbräu was a brewery in Munich, Germany. The associated inn served as a meeting place for the first branch of the German Workers' Party (DAP), which later changed its name to the Nazi Party (NSDAP). Similar to the Bürgerbräukeller, it was a place of pilgrimage for the Nazi movement. The building is now used as a residential and commercial building and is a registered monument on the Bavarian monument list.

== Location ==
The Sterneckerbräu was located in Munich's old town in the Tal 38 (originally 54) on the corner of Sterneckerstraße, very close to the Isartor.

== History ==
The present building originally covered three plots of land. In Jakob Sandtner's model of the city of Munich from 1570, three two-story houses can be seen. In the 16th and 17th centuries, the house at the corner of Tal and Sterneckergasse was owned by the beer brewer family Sternegger, after whom the road is named since 1696. A brewery had been there since 1557.

In the 19th century, the corner house and its eastern neighbor were replaced by a four-story building with a classical facade. This was demolished in 1901, and in 1901/02, the present building was built on the site of these two buildings and an additional adjoining plot. The building was built by Heilmann & Littmann for the brewer Joseph Höcherl.

The German Workers Party (DAP) of Anton Drexler met once a week in the restaurant on the first floor of the new building. On 12 September 1919, Adolf Hitler attended a meeting of the DAP on behalf of the intelligence command of the army. The meeting took place in a meeting room of the Sterneckerbräu. Drexler invited him to join the DAP. Hitler accepted on that date, becoming the party's 55th member. In October 1919, the first branch of the DAP, which in February 1920 changed its name to the Nazi Party (NSDAP), was set up in a side room of the Sterneckerbräu.

In 1921, the Bavarian nationalist and royalist league In Treue fest was founded at the Sterneckerbräu. It was banned by the Nazis on 2 February 1933, and later re-established in 1952.

On 8 November 1933, Hitler opened the Museum of the Nazi Party at the Sterneckerbräu, which was also mentioned in the Baedeker. The first inventory and office furniture, as well as the members' rooms, can still be viewed there.

The building survived World War II. In 1957 the restaurant was closed and the first floor was converted into a store.

== Building ==
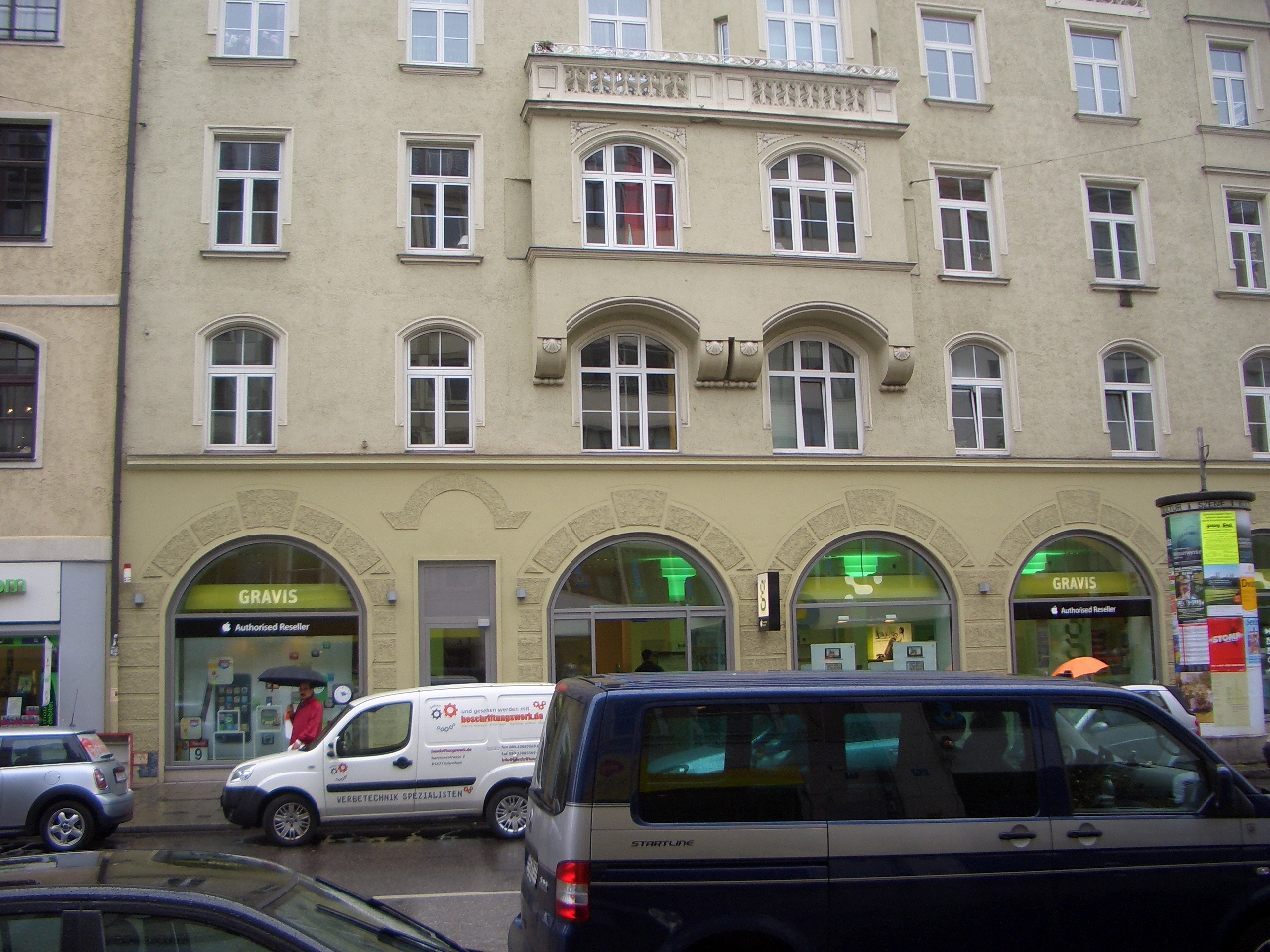
The Sterneckerbräu building in 2009

The Sterneckerbräu is a five-story corner building with a gable roof. The facade of the building facing the Tal has seven windows, and the one facing Sterneckerstraße has five. The corner is chamfered from the third floor upwards, with windows in the corner. On the first floor, the building has five large arcade arches at the Tal which serve as showrooms today. The entrance door is between the two leftmost arches. The facade of the building's upper floors is irregular. On the front facade of the building, on the third floor, the third and fourth windows from the left are bay windows, while on the fourth and fifth floors only the fourth windows are bay windows. On the fifth floor, the second and sixth windows have loggias.
