= Plan-relief =

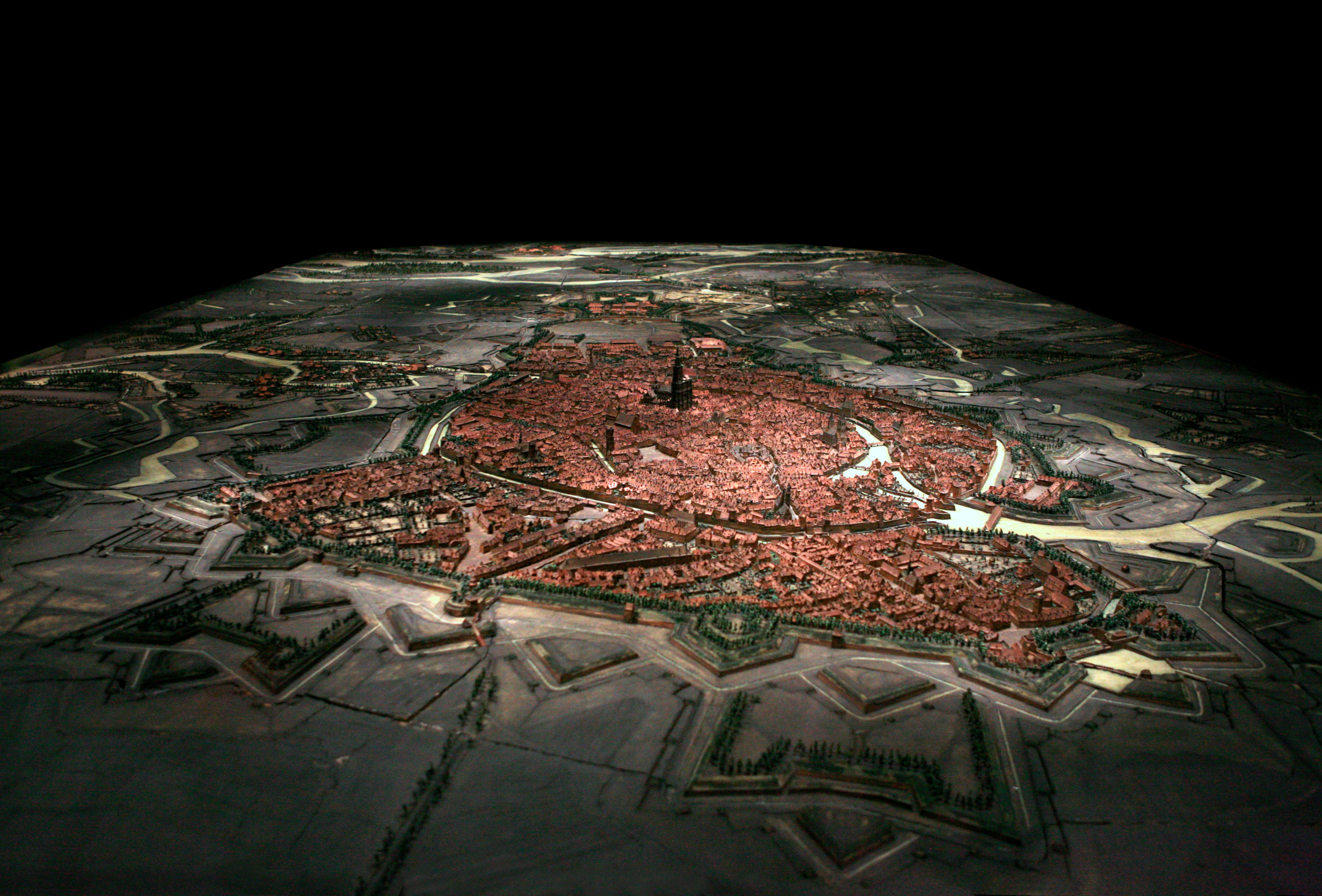
Plan-relief of Strasbourg, one of the 1:600 scale models requested by Louis XIV. On display at Strasbourg historical museum

A plan-relief (French pronunciation: [plɑ̃ ʁəljɛf]) is a scale model of a landscape and buildings produced for military usage, made to visualize building projects on fortifications or campaigns surrounding fortified locations.

== History ==
The first examples seem to have been used by the Venetian Republic and more generally by the Italian city-states of the Renaissance era. The wood turner Jakob Sandtner (fl. 1561-1579) produced plans-relief of many Bavarian towns, whilst in France Louis XIV's war minister Louvois initiated a collection of plans-relief of French strongholds on a 1:600 scale in 1688. This collection included 144 examples according to Vauban's 1697 inventory of it and was put on show at the Palais des Tuileries. Vauban's successors expanded the collection as and when operational necessity demanded, right up until 1870 when they were rendered obsolete by advances in the power of artillery. Some examples from this collection were destroyed and as a whole, it fell into disrepair until being made a Monument historique on 22 July 1927. One hundred examples from this collection survive, of which most are on show in the Museum of Plans-reliefs at Les Invalides and some others in the Palais des Beaux-Arts de Lille, still providing a witness to the towns and fortresses of France at this era.

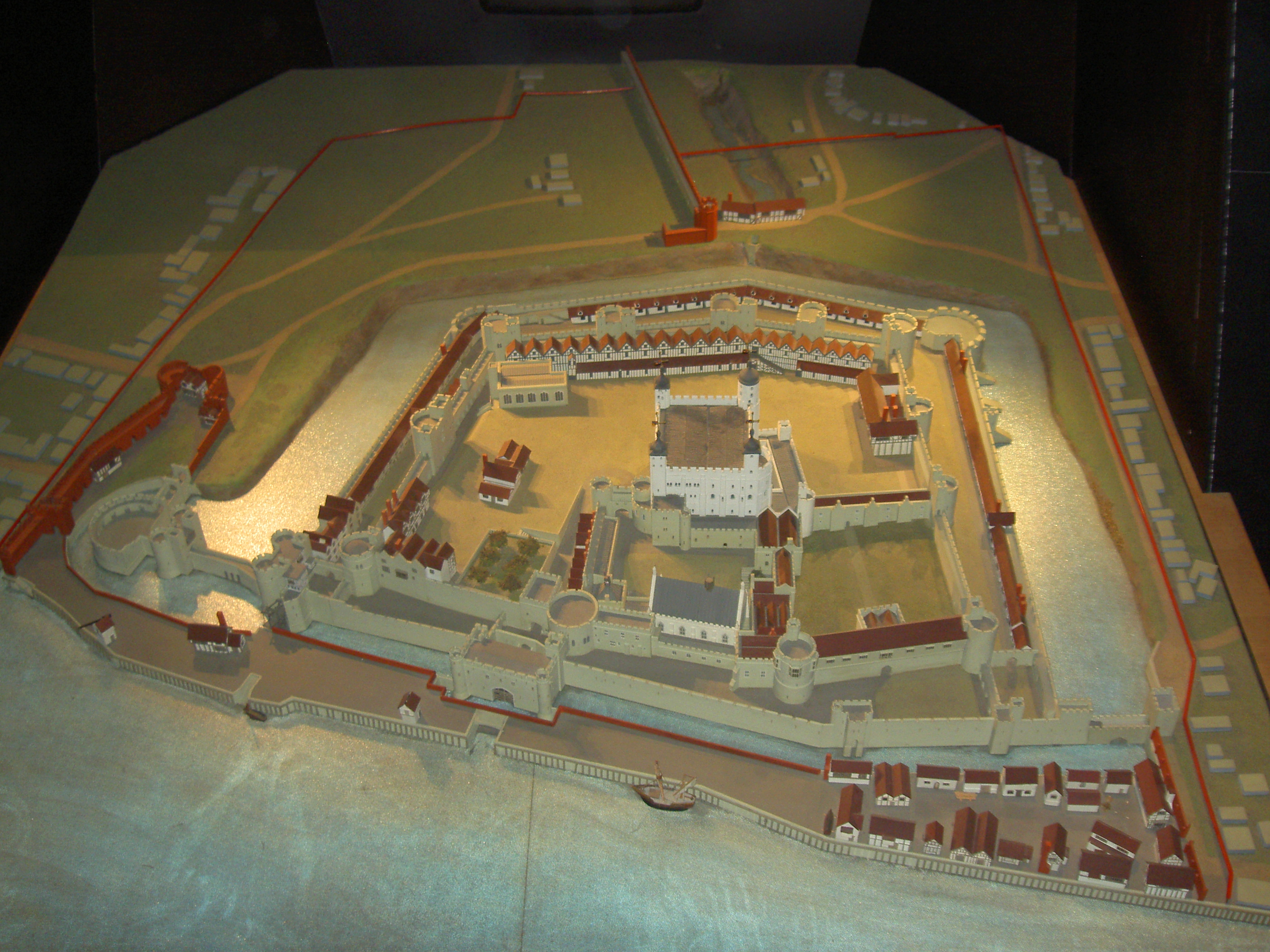
Plan-relief of the Tower of London.

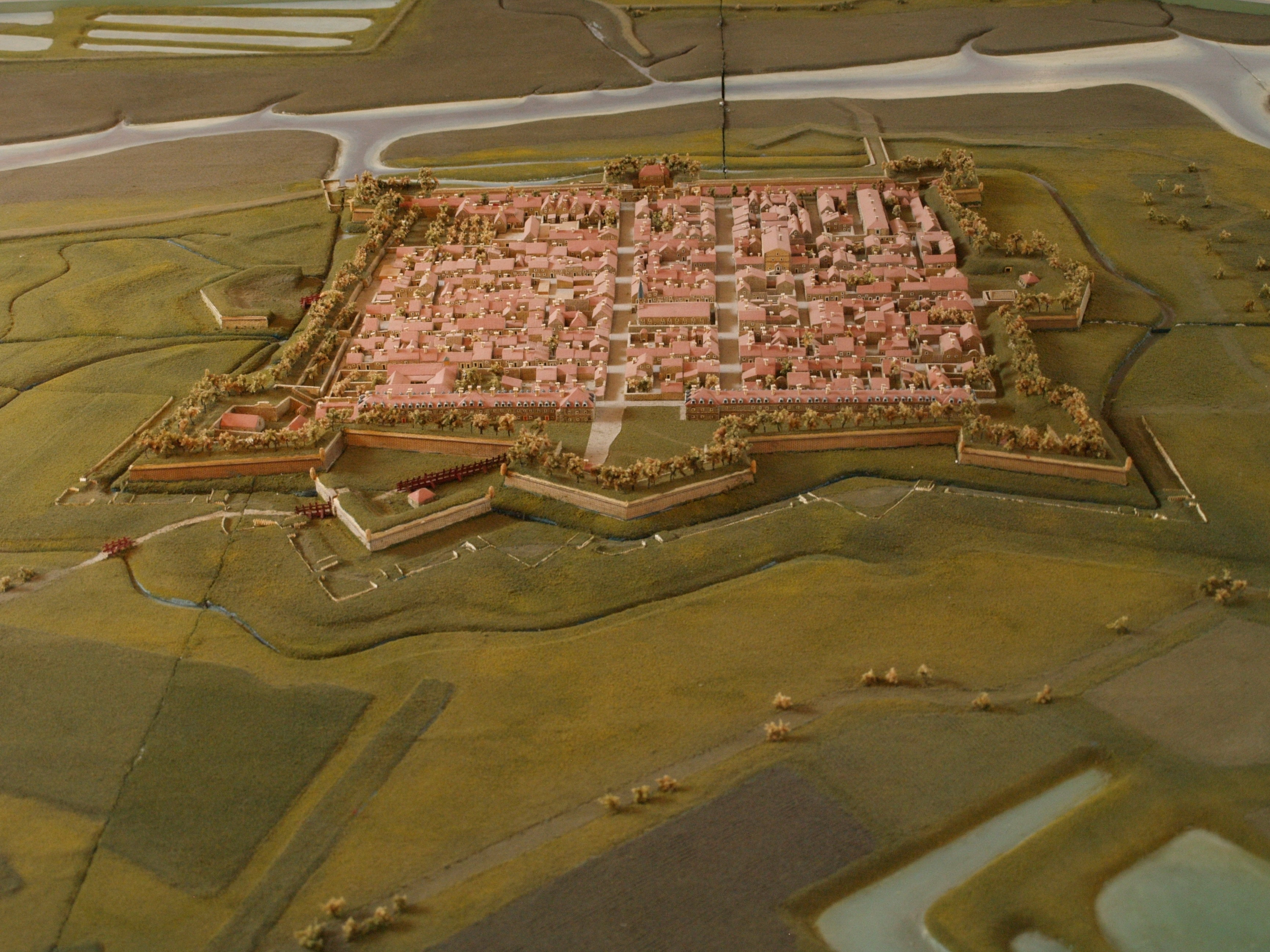
Citadel of Brouage - reproduction of the 17th century plan-relief (exhibited in the Halle aux vivres of the citadel)

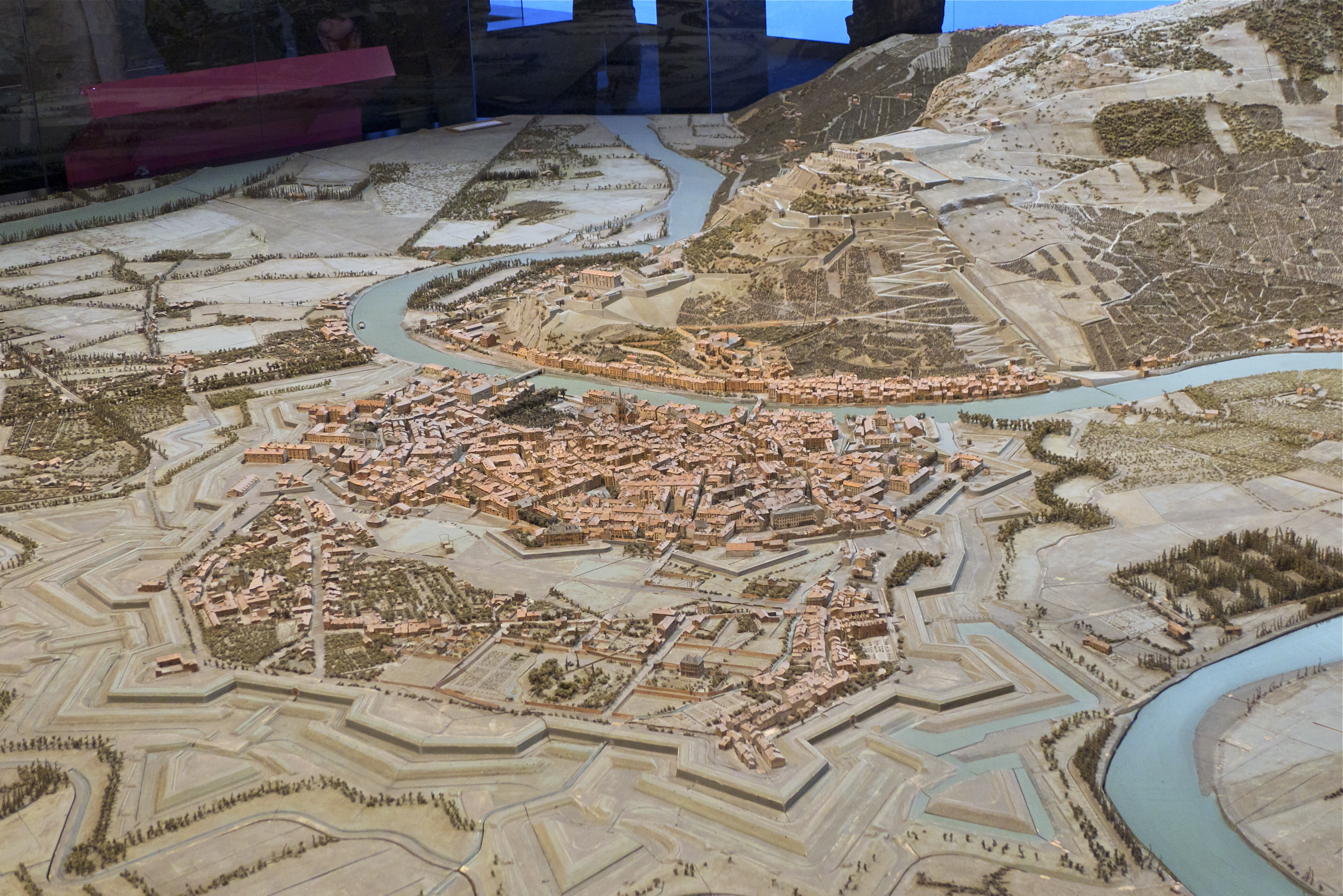
Grenoble in the alps (1848)

== Panstereoramas ==
After the success of the panorama painting, a spin-off of the plan-relief called the "panstereorama" emerged, this time for popular rather than military use. It was designed to offer an approximation of a balloon ride over a given city. No known models survive.
