= Bock =

Strong lager

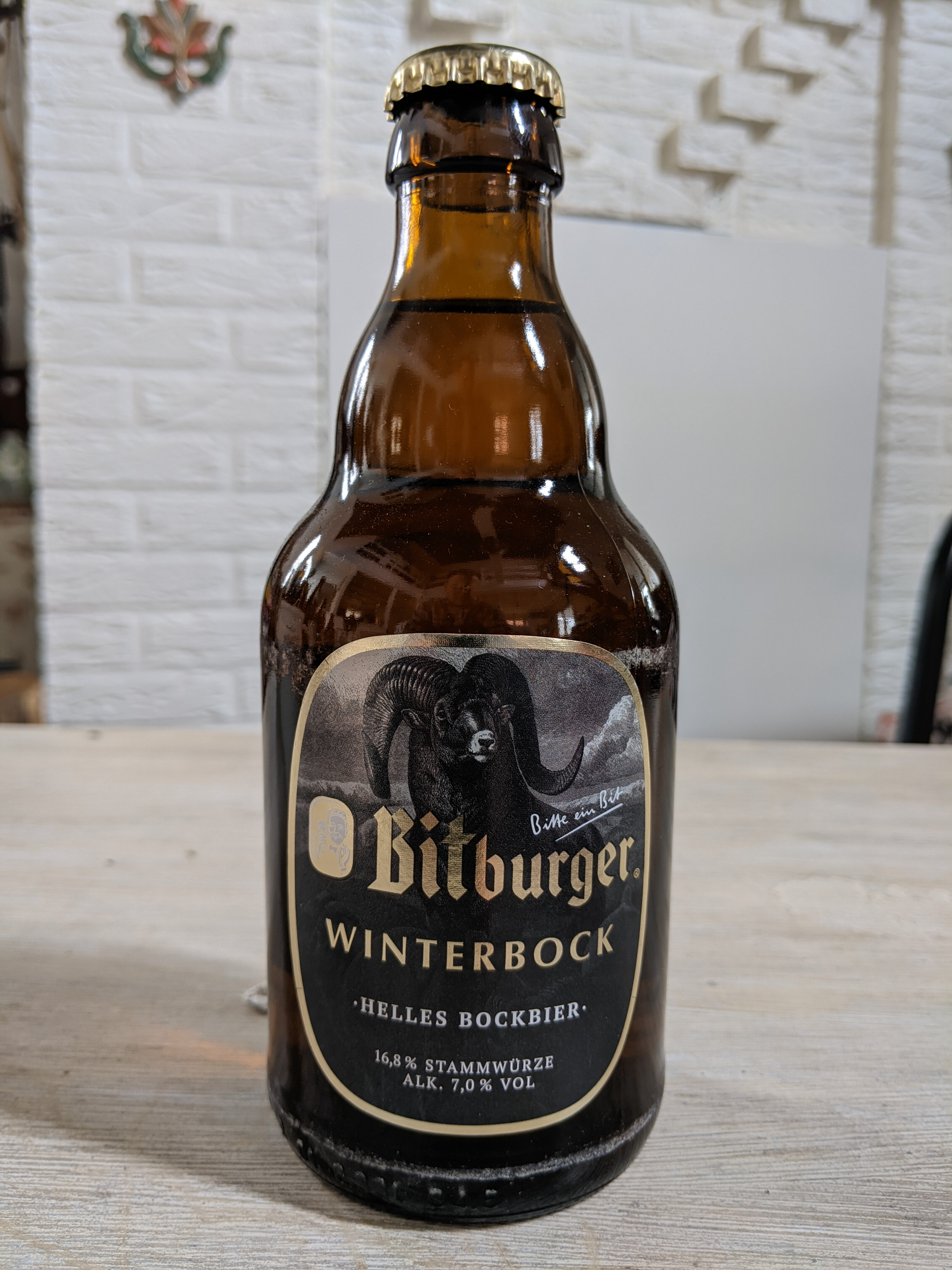
- Bottle of Bitburger Winterbock
- Origin: Germany
- Introduced: 14th century
- Alcohol by volume: 6.3–13% or more, depending on the variant
- Colour: Light copper to brown
- Variants: Maibock, doppelbock, weizenbock, eisbock

Bock (German: [bɔk]) is a strong German beer, usually a dark lager.

== History ==
The style now known as bock was first brewed in the 14th century in the Hanseatic town of Einbeck in Lower Saxony.

The style was later adopted in Bavaria by Munich brewers in the 17th century. Due to their Bavarian accent, citizens of Munich pronounced "Einbeck" as "ein bock" ("a billy goat"), and thus the beer became known as "bock". A goat often appears on bottle labels. An 1882 article in The Baltimore Sun described it thus: "The word bock signifies goat, and its prefix to beer indicates that bock beer is so potent and exhilarating that the drinker soon becomes as frisky in his gambols as the goat."

Bock is historically associated with special occasions, often festivals such as Christmas, Easter, or Lent (Lentenbock). Bock has a long history of being brewed and consumed by Bavarian monks as a source of nutrition during times of fasting.

== Styles ==
Substyles of bock include:

- Maibock (May bock), a paler, more hopped version generally made for consumption at spring festivals. Due to its lighter colour, it is also referred to as heller bock; from German hell (bright, light in colour).
- Doppelbock (double bock), a stronger and maltier version.
- Eisbock (ice bock), a much stronger version made by partially freezing the beer and removing the ice that forms.
- Weizenbock (wheat bock), a wheat beer made from 40 to 60% wheat.

Traditionally bock is a sweet, relatively strong (6.3–7.6% by volume), lightly hopped lager registering between 20 and 30 International Bitterness Units (IBUs). The beer should be clear, with colour ranging from light copper to brown, and a bountiful, persistent off-white head. The aroma should be malty and toasty, possibly with hints of alcohol, but no detectable hops or fruitiness. The mouthfeel is smooth, with low to moderate carbonation and no astringency. The taste is rich and toasty, sometimes with a bit of caramel. The low-to-undetectable presence of hops provides just enough bitterness so that the sweetness is not cloying and the aftertaste is muted.

=== Maibock ===
The maibock style – also known as heller bock or lente bock in the Netherlands – is a strong pale lager, lighter in colour and with more hop presence.

Colour can range from deep gold to light amber with a large, creamy, persistent white head, and moderate to moderately high carbonation, while alcohol content ranges from 6.3% to 8.1% by volume. The flavour is typically less malty than a traditional bock, and may be drier, hoppier, and more bitter, but still with a relatively low hop flavour, with a mild spicy or peppery quality from the hops, increased carbonation and alcohol content.

=== Doppelbock ===
Doppelbock or double bock is a stronger version of traditional bock that was first brewed in Munich by the Paulaner friars, a mendicant order founded by St. Francis of Paula.

Historically, doppelbock was high in alcohol and sweetness. The story is told that it served as "liquid bread" for the Friars during times of fasting when solid food was not permitted. Mark Dredge, in his book A Brief History of Lager, claims that this story is a fable and that the monks produced doppelbock to supplement their order's vegetarian diet all year. In 2011, journalist J. Wilson proved this was at least possible by consuming only doppelbock and water for the 46 days of Lent.

Modern style guidelines suggest a minimum strength of around 6.6–7% alcohol by volume, with an upper limit of 8–10% or higher. It is clear, with colour ranging from dark gold, for the paler version, to dark brown with ruby highlights for a darker version. It has a large, creamy, persistent head (although head retention may be impaired by alcohol in the stronger versions). The aroma is intensely malty, with some toasty notes, and possibly some alcohol presence as well; darker versions may have a chocolate-like or fruity aroma. The flavour is very rich and malty, with noticeable alcoholic strength, and little or no detectable hops (16–26 IBUs). Paler versions may have a drier finish.

The monks who originally brewed doppelbock named their beer "Sankt-vater-bier" ("Blessed Father beer"). This was eventually shortened to "Salvator" (literally "Savior"), which today is trademarked by Paulaner.

Brewers of modern doppelbock often add "-ator" to their beer's name as a signpost of the style; there are 200 "-ator" doppelbock names registered with the German patent office, including Paulaner Salvator, Ayinger Celebrator, Spaten Optimator and Augustiner Maximator.

=== Eisbock ===
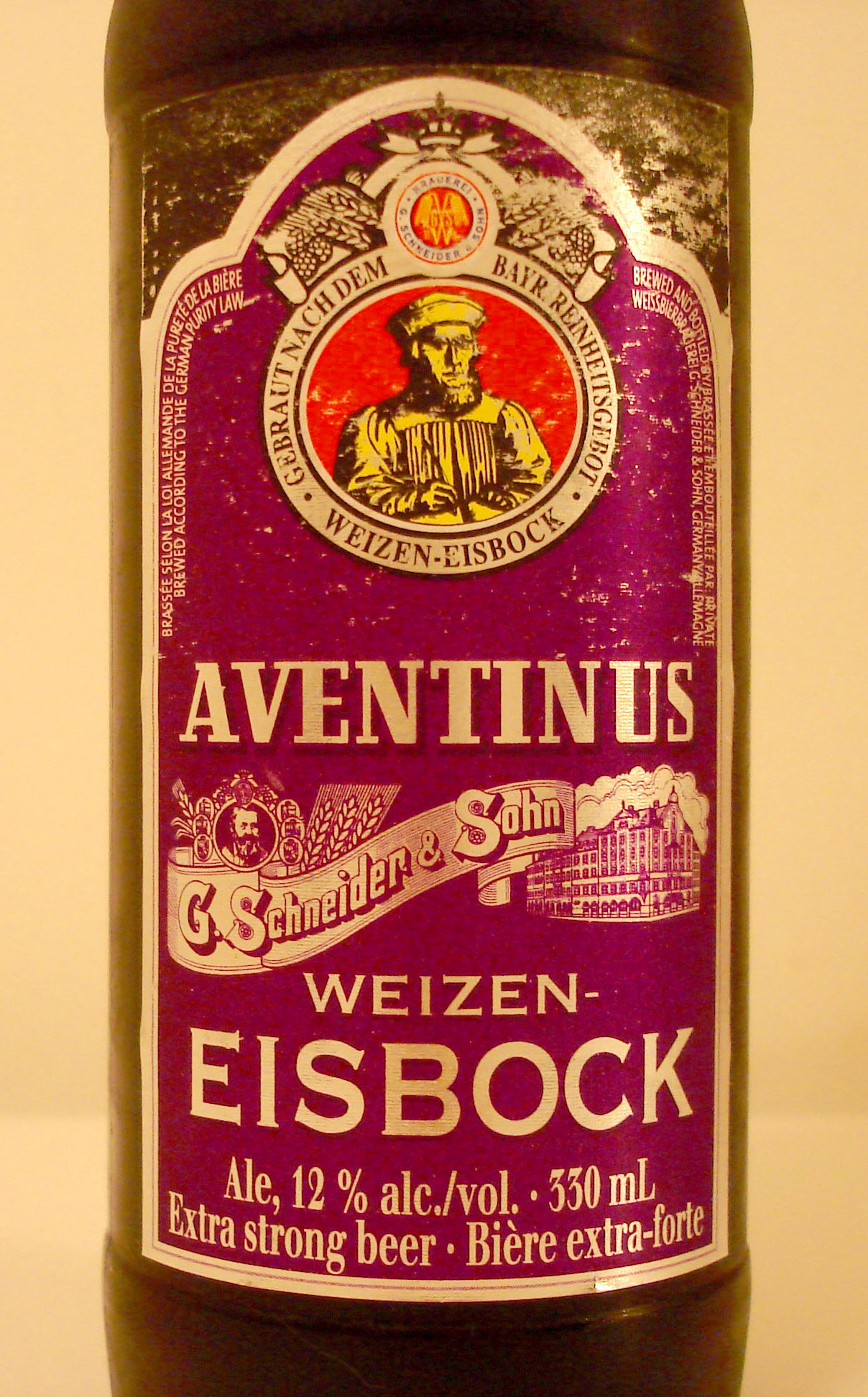
Eisbock beer, made by removing ice from partially frozen barrels of beer to produce a higher alcohol content

Eisbock is a traditional specialty beer of the Kulmbach district of Bavaria, made by partially freezing a doppelbock and removing the water ice to concentrate the flavour and alcohol content, which ranges from 8.6% to 14.3% by volume.

It is clear, with a colour ranging from deep copper to dark brown, often with ruby highlights. Although it can pour with a thin off-white head, head retention is frequently impaired by the higher alcohol content. The aroma is intense, with no hop presence, but frequently can contain fruity notes, especially of prunes, raisins, and plums. Mouthfeel is full and smooth, with significant alcohol, although this should not be hot or sharp. The flavour is rich and sweet, often with toasty notes, and sometimes hints of chocolate, always balanced by a significant alcohol presence.

The following are representative examples of the style: Colorado Team Brew "Warning Sign", Kulmbacher Reichelbräu Eisbock, Eggenberg, Schneider Aventinus Eisbock, Urbock Dunkel Eisbock, Franconia Brewing Company Ice Bock 17%.

The strongest ice beer, Strength in Numbers, was a one-time collaboration in 2020 between Schorschbrau of Germany and BrewDog of Scotland, who had competed with each other in the early years of the 21st century to produce the world's strongest beer. Strength in Numbers was created using traditional ice distillation, reaching a final strength of 57.8% ABV.

=== Weizenbock ===
Weizenbock is a style that replaces some of the barley in the grain bill with 40–60% wheat. It was first produced in Bavaria in 1907 by G. Schneider & Sohn and was named Aventinus after 16th-century Bavarian historian Johannes Aventinus. The style combines darker Munich malts and top-fermenting wheat beer yeast, brewed at the strength of a doppelbock.
