= G. Schneider & Sohn =

Bavarian brewer of weissbier

Private Weissbierbrauerei G. Schneider & Sohn GmbH
- Interactive map of Private Weissbierbrauerei G. Schneider & Sohn GmbH
- Location: Kelheim, Germany
- Coordinates: 48°55′2″N 11°52′28″E
- Opened: 1872
- Annual production volume: 300,000 hectolitres (260,000 US bbl) in 2007
- Owned by: Georg Schneider VI
- Employees: 101 (2012)
- Website: schneider-weisse.de/en

Active beers
Name	Type
Tap 1, Meine Helle Weisse	Helles Weissbier
Tap 2, Mein Kristall	Kristallweizen
Tap 3, Mein Alkoholfrei	Low-alcohol-Weizen
Tap 4, Meine Festweisse	Hefeweizen-Oktoberfestbier
Tap 5, Meine Hopfenweisse	Weizen-Bock
Tap 6, Mein Aventinus	Weizen-Doppelbock
Tap 7, Mein Original	Hefeweizen
Tap 11, Meine Leichte Weisse	Hefeweizen
Tap 9, Aventinus Eisbock	Weizen-Eisbock

Seasonal beers
Name	Type
Tap X	Weizen Doppelbock

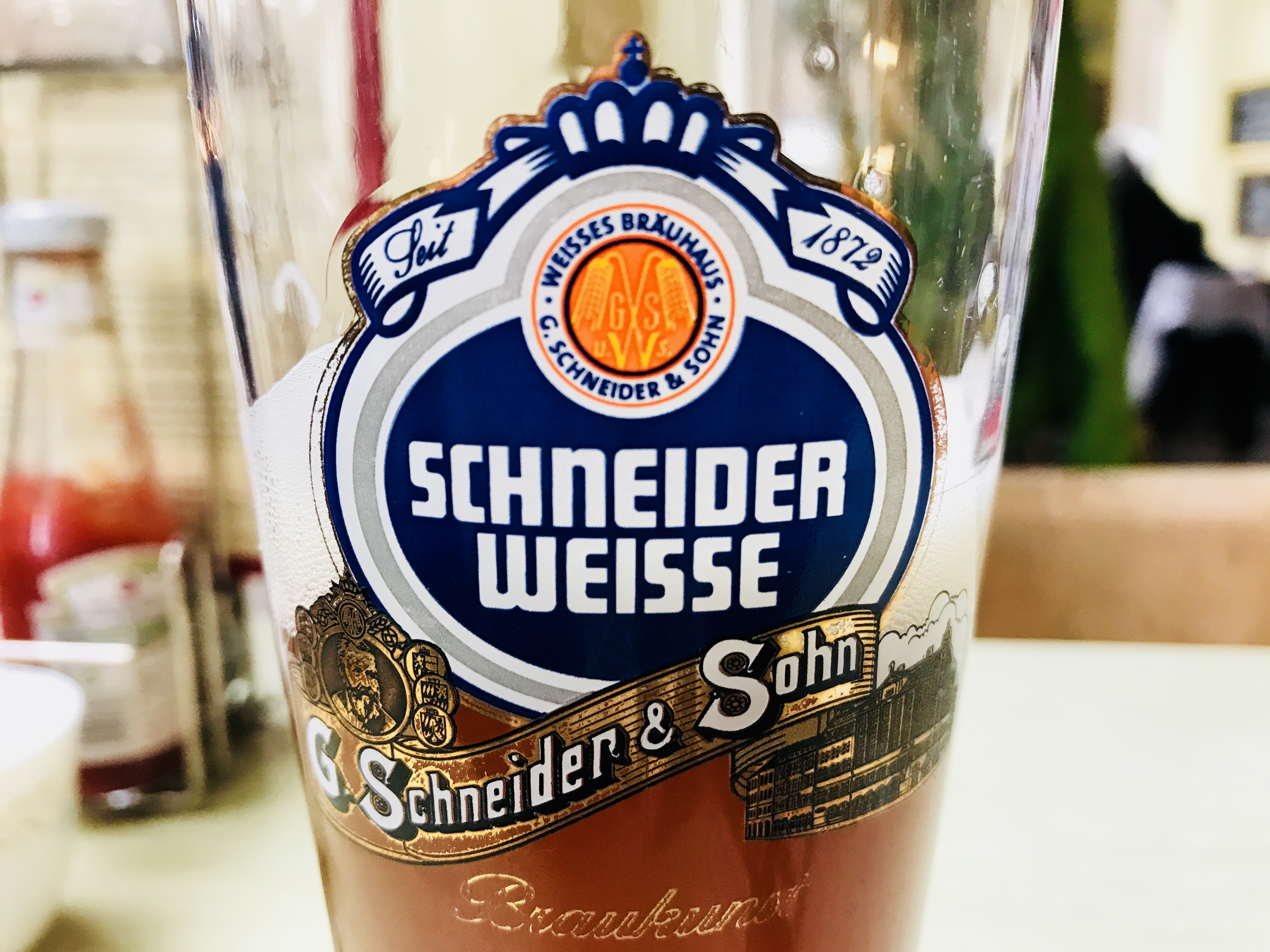
Glass of Tap 7 Mein Original, showing the Schneider Weisse logo.

G. Schneider & Sohn is a weissbier brewing company in Bavaria, Germany.

== History ==
The brewery was founded in 1872 by Georg Schneider I and his son Georg Schneider II, after they acquired the Weisses Brauhaus in Munich, the oldest wheat beer brewery in the city. In 1927 the owners, under Georg Schneider IV, expanded their brewing operations into Kelheim and Straubing. After the breweries in Munich were destroyed in 1944 by aerial bombardment by the Allies of World War II, the entire production was relocated to Kelheim. In occupied Germany, a few weeks after the end of World War II, the Third United States Army granted G. Schneider & Sohn permission to continue production of their wheat beers and deliver them to Munich. However, they added the caveats that they could only produce lower alcohol beer and it could only be sold to military personnel. To this day, the owners are descendants of Georg Schneider I.

Today, the brewery employs around 100 people and distributes its products across Germany and 27 other countries. The annual output is about 300,000 hectolitres, of which about 25% is sent outside of Germany.

== Owners ==
The brewery has remained in the Schneider family since its conception in 1872.

Picture	Name	Born	Owner since	Died	Known as	Notes
	Georg Schneider I	1817	1872	1890	Georg I Schneider	
	Georg Schneider II	1846	1872	1890		
	Georg Schneider III	1870	1890	1905	The Collector	
	Mathilde Schneider	1877	1905	1972	The Persistent	
	Georg Schneider IV	1900	1924	1991	The Undaunted	
	Georg Schneider V	1928	1958	2023	The Conductor	
	Georg Schneider VI	1965	2000		The Artist	

== Beers ==
The entire product line consists of top-fermented wheat beers; Aventinus and Original are also bottle conditioned. The wheat comes from the upper Altmühltal, lower Bavaria, and Upper Palatinate regions. The malting barley is grown in the Kelheim and Riedenburg areas. Hallertau hops are used to give the beers their bittering and aromatic properties. The core product is TAP 7 Mein Original (formerly Schneider Weisse Original), which is brewed according to the origin recipe of 1872. Georg Schneider VI renamed the Schneider Weisse product range in 2009, so as to draw attention to the fact that the brewery also produces the products TAP 1 to TAP 6.

=== Tap 6 Mein Aventinus ===
Aventinus is a strong, dark, wheat doppelbock introduced in 1907 by Mathilde Schneider and named after Johannes Aventinus, a Bavarian historian. In 1907, Aventinus was the first weizenbock of Bavarian history. In 2014, Mein Aventinus won gold in the 'South German-Style Weizenbock' category at the US Brewers Association's World Beer Cup and in 2018 the beer won silver in the same category.

=== Aventinus Eisbock ===
Eisbock is a style said to have been 'invented' by accident in the late 19th Century, when during a particularly cold winter, a cistern full of bock beer froze. The water contained in the beer turned into ice; the remaining liquid was in effect of bock concentrate, with more powerful aromas, flavours and alcohol content. This method of freezing beer to increase strength and richness has been duplicated by many breweries, with Schneider first brewing their Aventinus Eisbock in 2002. In 2017, Aventinus Eisbock won gold in the 'wheat beers' category at the Stockholm Beer and Whiskey Festival.

=== Range ===
Tap No.	Picture	Name	First brewed	Style	ABV	Formerly known as	Notes
1		Meine Helle Weisse	1994	Helles Weissbier	5.2%	Schneider Weisse Weizenhell	
2		Mein Kristall	1990	Kristallweizen	5.3%	Schneider Weisse Kristall	
3		Mein Alkoholfrei	2002	Low-alcohol-Weizen	0.5%	Schneider Weisse Alkoholfrei	
4		Meine Festweisse	1916	Hefeweizen-Oktoberfestbier	6.2%	Georg Schneider's Edel-Weisen	Recently available since 1999, developed from the original 1916 recipe.
5		Meine Hopfenweisse	2008	Weizen-Bock	8.2%	Schneider & Brooklyner Hopfen-Weisse	First created as a collaboration between Georg Schneider VI and Garrett Oliver of Brooklyn Brewery in New York.
6		Mein Aventinus	1907	Weizen Doppelbock	8.2%	Schneider Aventinus Weizendoppelbock	Bavaria's oldest wheat doppelbock.
7		Mein Original	1872	Hefeweizen	5.4%	Schneider Weisse Original	The original recipe of Georg I. Schneider
9		Aventinus Eisbock	2002	Eisbock	12%	Aventinus Eisbock	Matured using a special freezing process.
X			2010	Weizen-Doppelbock	10%		A different speciality (often barrel aged) beer released every year since 2010. 2012 - Mein Cuvée Barrique; 2013 - Meine Porter Weisse; 2014 - Mein Eisbock Barrique; 2015 - Mathilda Soleil; 2016 - Marie's Rendezvous; 2017 - Mein Nelson Sauvin; 2018 - TBC
11		Meine Leichte Weisse	1986	Hefeweizen	3.3%	Schneider Weisse Leicht	

== Inns ==
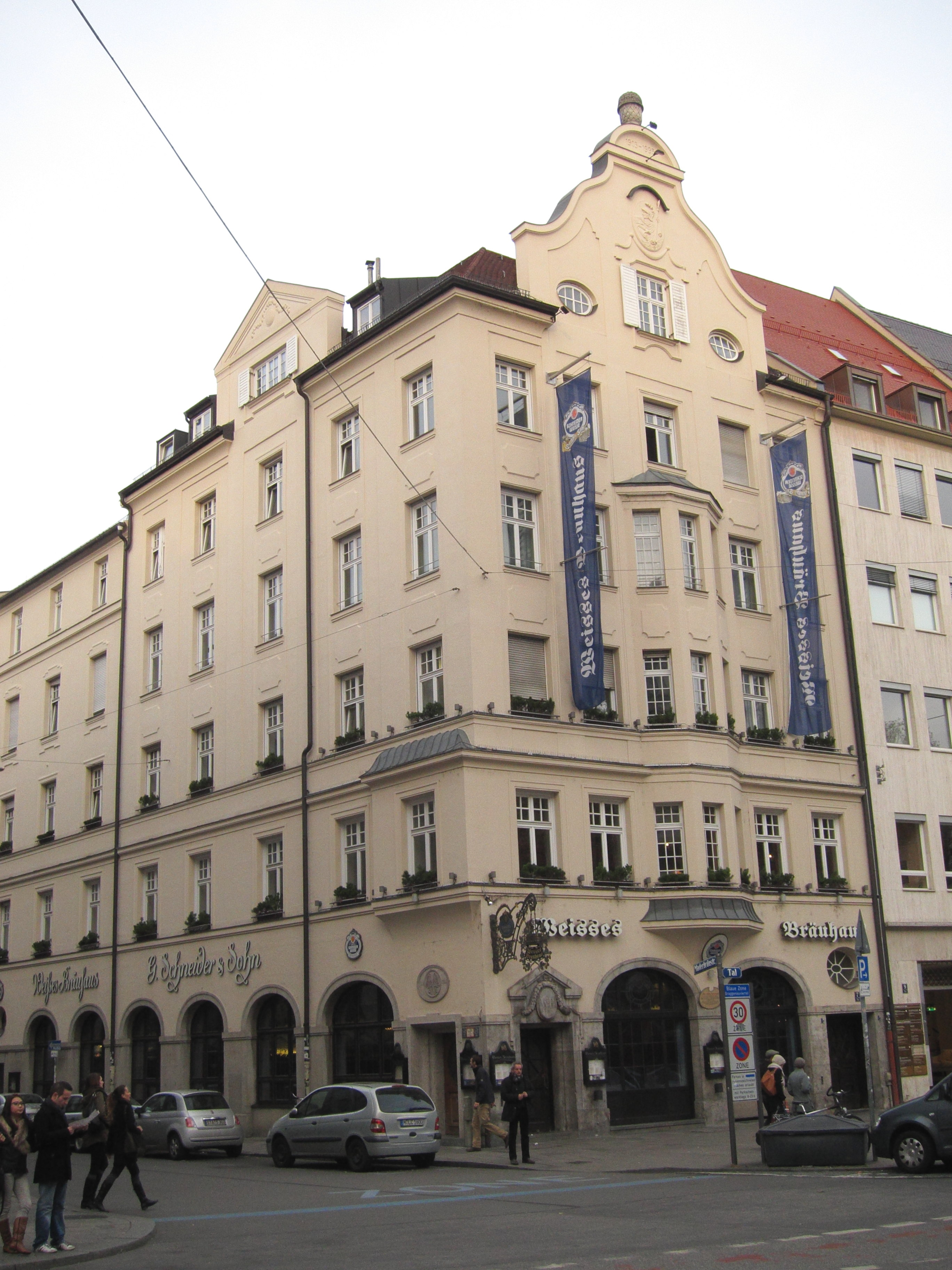
Schneider Bräuhaus in Munich

The company includes three guesthouses. They are located in the former headquarters in Munich (Tal), in the Munich district of Berg am Laim, and on the brewery site in Kelheim. In early 2016, they were renamed from Weisses Bräuhaus to Schneider Bräuhaus.

== Gallery ==
Schneider Weisse brewery in Kelheim, Germany
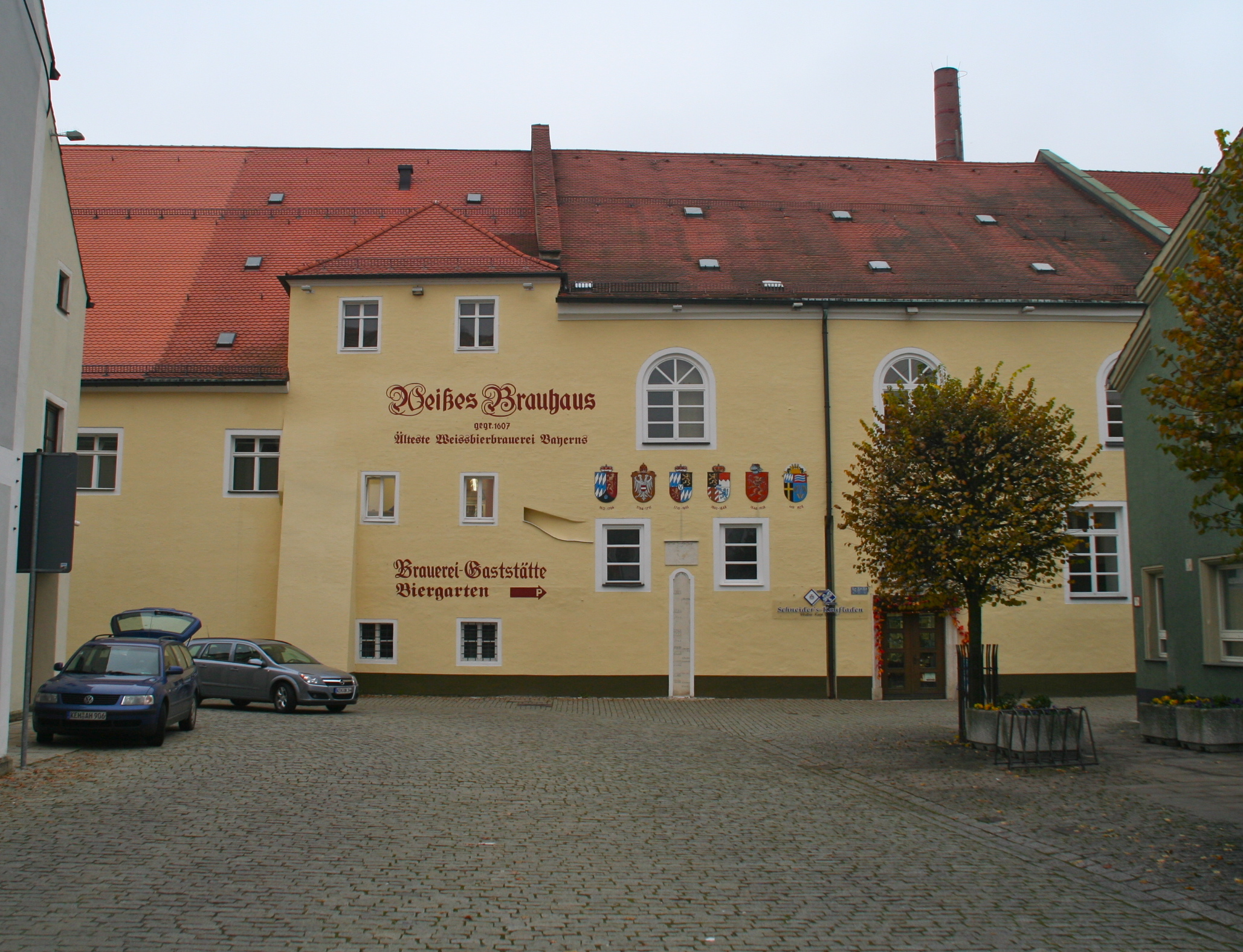
Schneider Weisse brewery

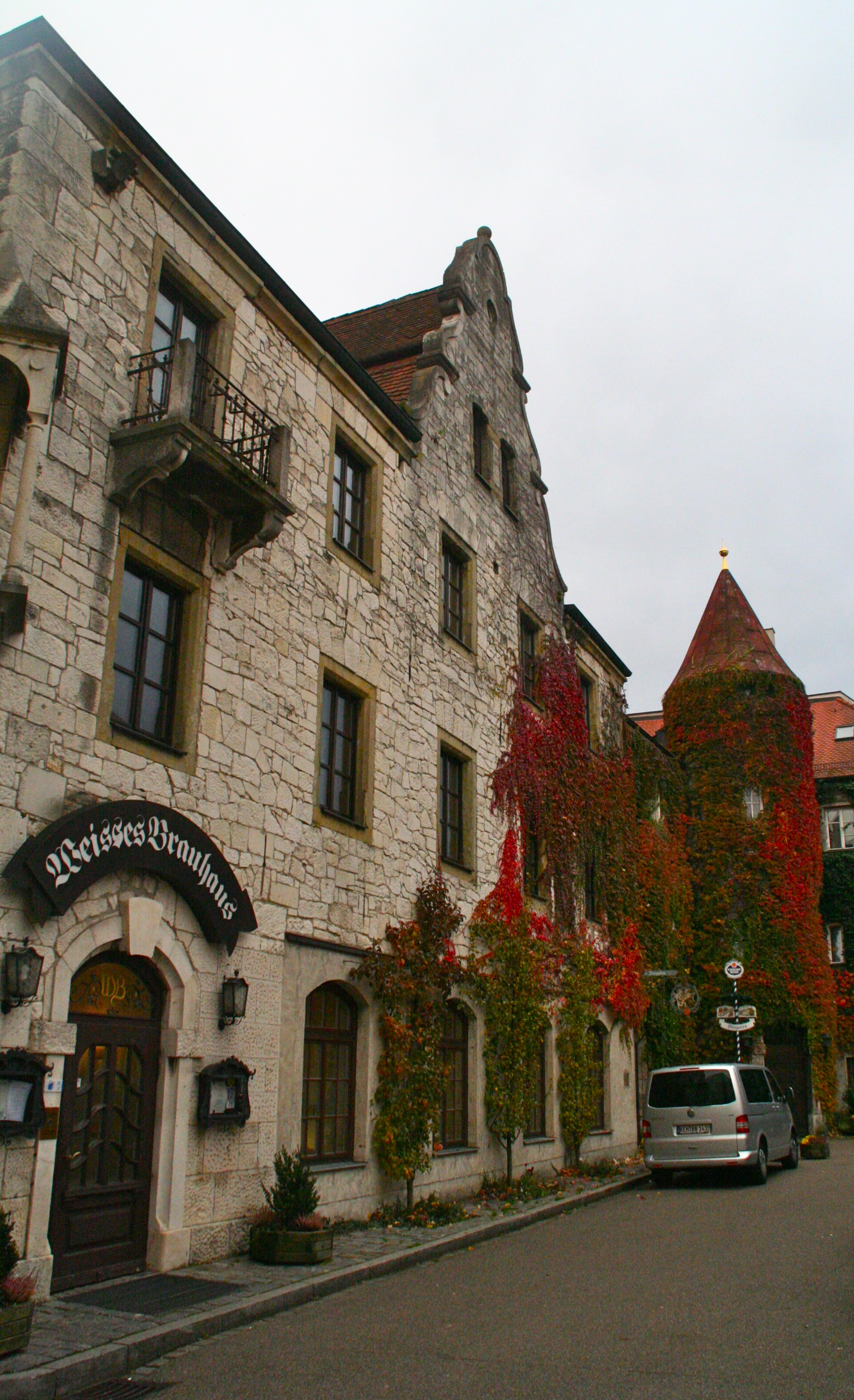
Schneider Weisse brewery

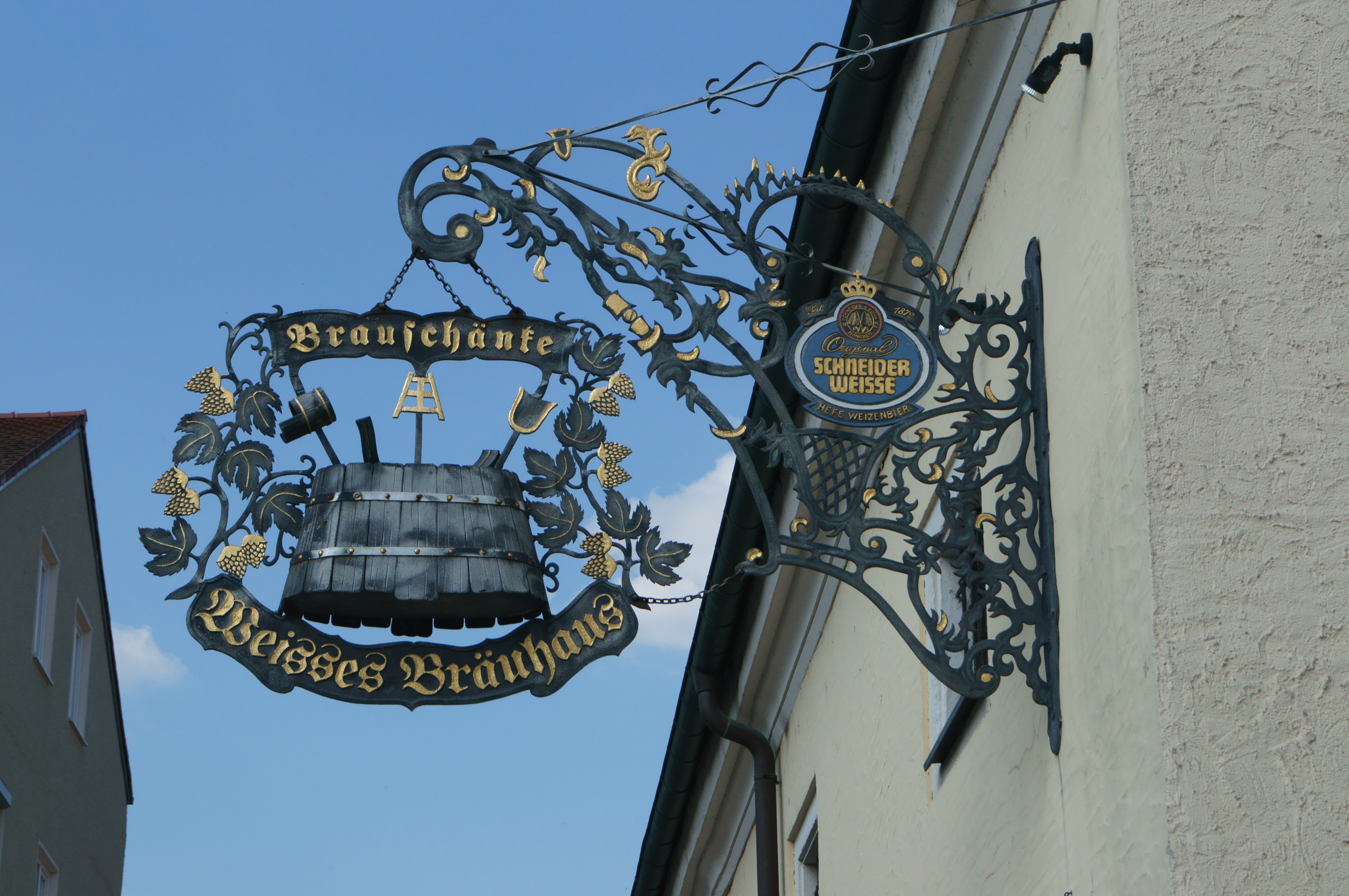
Schneider Weisse sign at the brewery

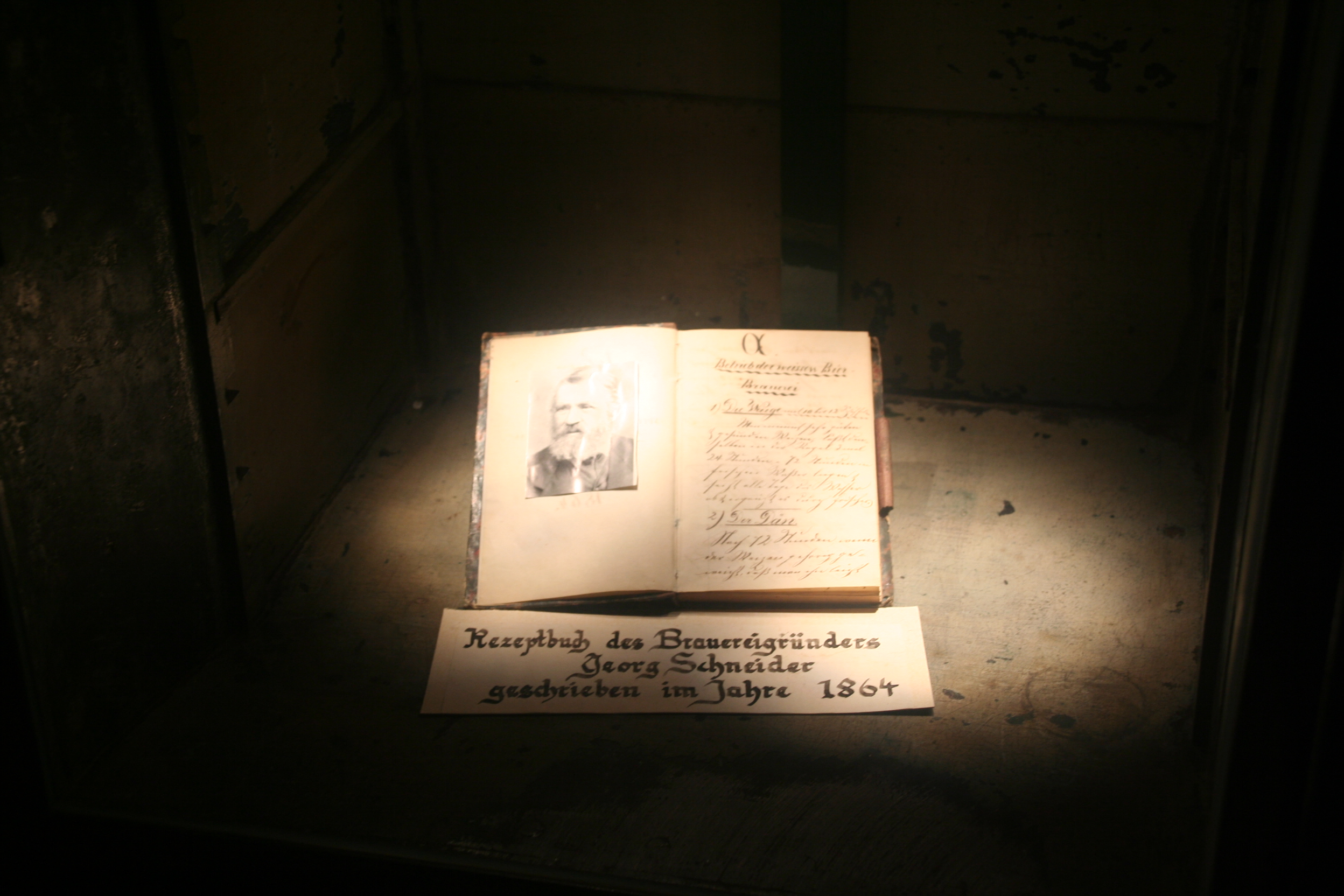
Schneider Weisse original recipe book

== See also ==
- Barrel-aged beer
