= Arthur Achleitner =

German writer

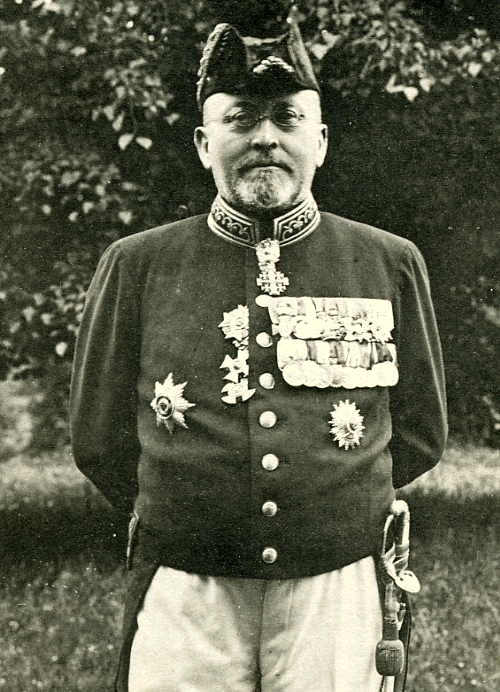
Arthur Achleitner in 1922

Arthur Achleitner (August 16, 1858 in Straubing, Kingdom of Bavaria – September 29, 1927 in Munich) was a German writer. His works are noteworthy because he describes local customs and peculiarities of the people in the Austrian and Bavarian Alps, and the Mediterranean regions of the former Austro-Hungarian Empire (mainly Croatia and Bosnia).

== Works ==
- Aus Kroatien. Skizzen und Erzählungen eLibrary Austria Project (elib austria text in German)
- Bergrichters Erdenwallen eLibrary Austria Project (elib austria text in German)
- Celsissimus eLibrary Austria Project (elib austria text in German)
- Im grünen Tann eLibrary Austria Project (elib austria text in German)
