= Tal (Munich) =

Street in Munich, Germany

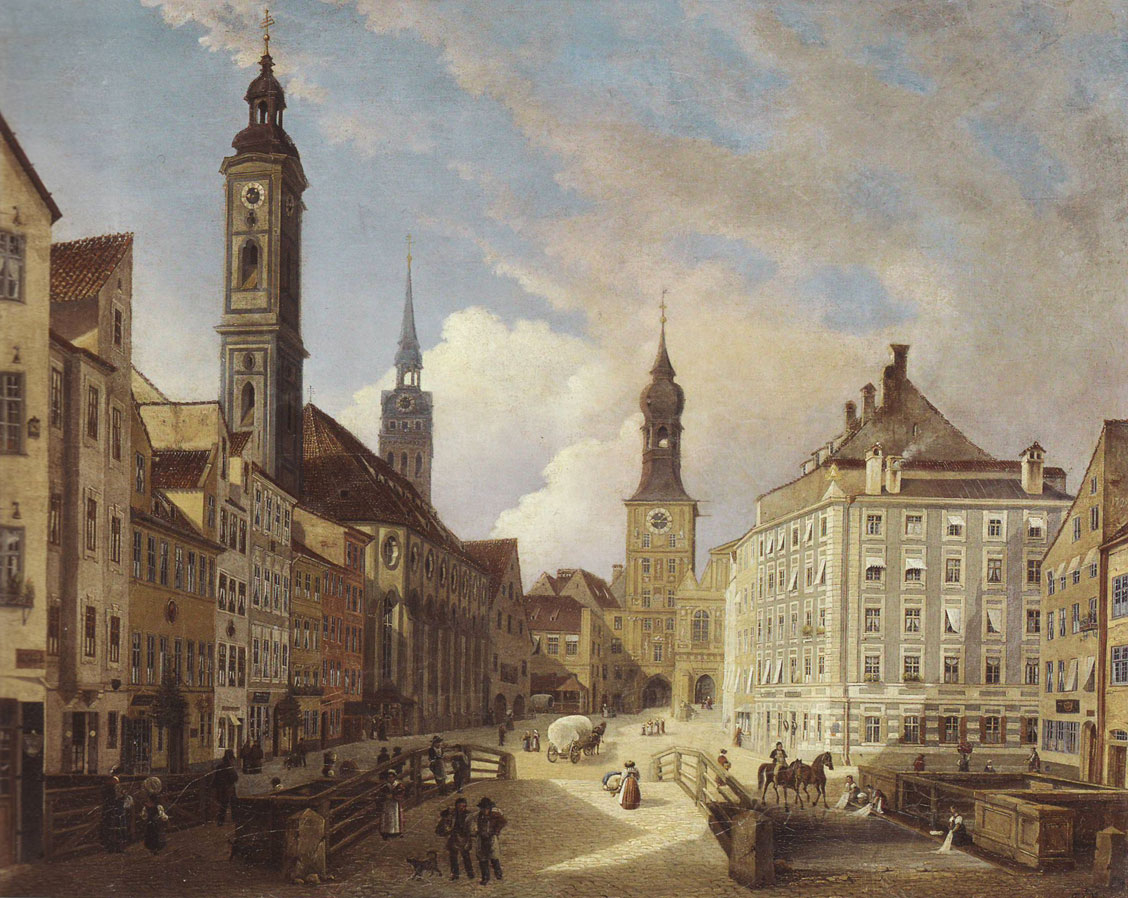
View from the year 1835. View from east to west. To the left is the tower of the Holy Spirit Church, in the center the Old Town Hall

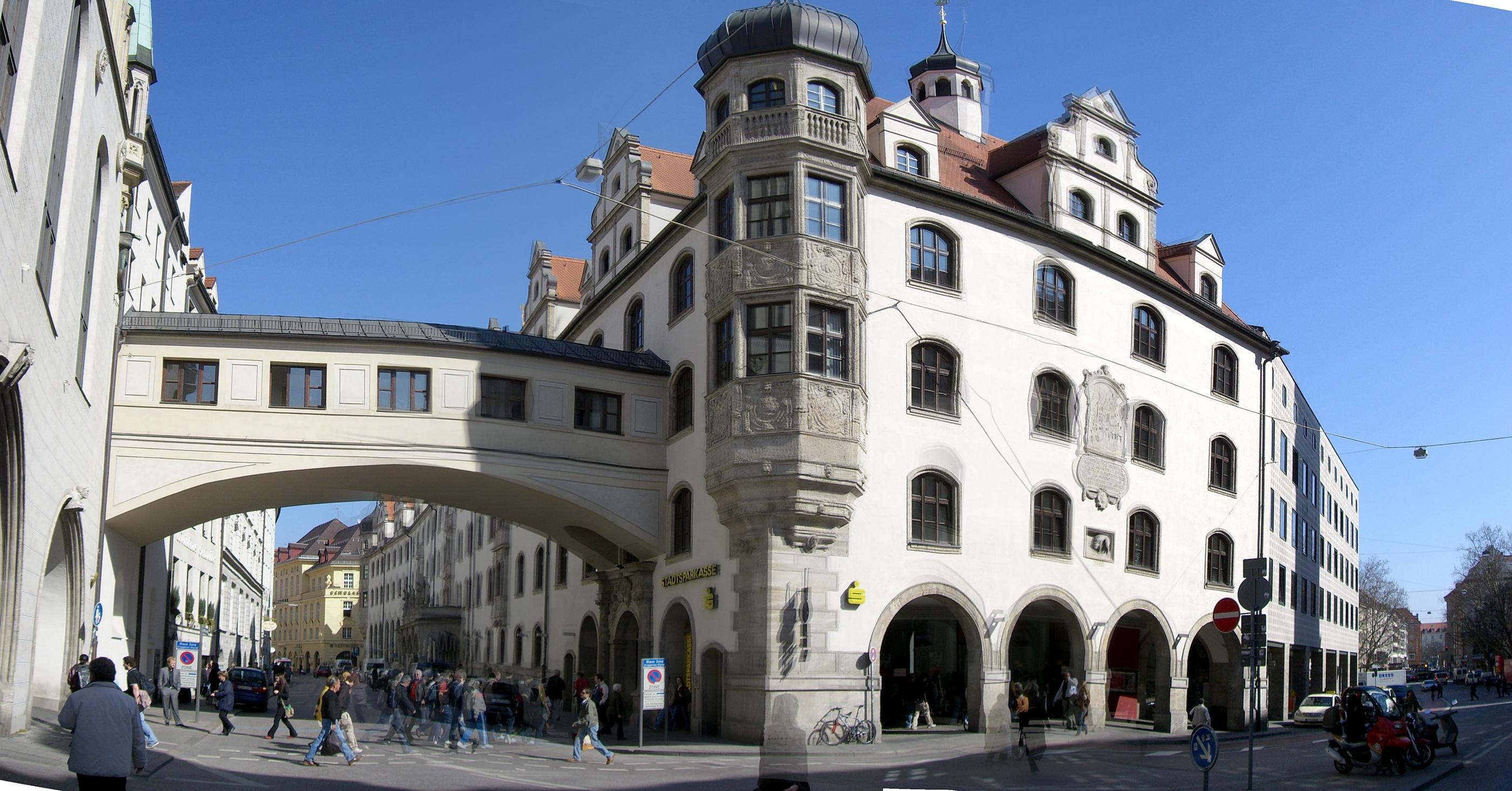
Today's view at the western end of the Tal. The road continues right up to the Isartor

The Tal is a street in the old town of Munich.

The Tal extends over a length of 500 meters between the Old Town Hall on Marienplatz in the west and Isartor in the east. The Tal was therefore a part of the Salzstrasse, which led from Salzburg or Bad Reichenhall through Munich and Landsberg on the Lech to Switzerland. The street was located outside the first medieval city wall, which is why it starts at the Holy Spirit Church, which was used as the church for the first Munich hospital and was consciously constructed outside the walls. The name of the road goes back to its historical references, to which a document from the year 1253 testifies that the street has had ist name at least since the 13th century.

Today the street is characterized by retail chains and gastronomy. Among the residents are a branch of the Stadtsparkasse Munich and the Schneider Bräuhaus (named the Weißes Bräuhaus until 2015). In the street are many historical protected residential and commercial buildings, including the Kalter-Haus.

In the Tal, there was an important meeting place for Nazi politicians and their sympathizers: the Sterneckerbräu (Tal 54, today 38). Starting in 1919, the members of the newly formed German Workers' Party (DAP) met here - a German small party and the predecessor organization of the NSDAP, which already belonged to Adolf Hitler. Hitler set up the first office of the DAP in an adjacent room of the Sterneckerbräu in October 1919, which, however, had to move to the larger Gasthaus Cornelius (Corneliusstrasse 12) soon afterwards due to increasing membership numbers. In the time of National Socialism, the Sterneckerbräu became a party museum of the NSDAP. The building survived the war, and today businesses are located in the former restaurant. Also in Sterneckerbräu, the founding of the Bavarian homeland and king-band "In Treue fest" took place in 1921, which was banned on 2 February 1934 by the National Socialists and re-founded in 1952.
