= Thomas Naogeorgus =

Thomas Naogeorgus (Thomas Kirchmeyer, Kirchmair, Neubauer; 21 December 1508 – 29 December 1563) was a Latin dramatist, humanist, Protestant theologian, Protestant reformer, preacher and pamphleteer of the German Renaissance.

Naogeorgus was born in Straubing. His dramatic works were very influential in the German Reformation. He was greatly influenced by Martin Luther, but his teachings stand independent of Lutheranism, and the publication of his exegesis of 1 John was opposed by Luther and Melanchthon. He died, aged 55, in Wiesloch.

== Works ==
- Pammachius, 1538
- Mercator seu judicium, tragedy, 1540
- Incendia seu Pyrgopolinices, drama, 1541
- Hamanus, tragedy, 1543
- Carmen de bello Germanico, poems, 1548
- Epitome ecclesiasticorum dogmatum, 1548
- Agricultura sacra, 1550
- Hieremias, tragedy, 1551
- Iudas Iscariotes, drama, 1552
- Satyrarum libri quinque, 1555
- Regnum papisticum, 1555
- De dissidiis componendis, ad Mathiam Bredenbachium, ludimagistrum Embricensem, Basilaeae 1559.

His collected works were edited by Hans-Gert Roloff (Berlin 1975-).

== Literature ==
- Franz Krojer: Naogeorg, in: Aufschluss des Gäubodens, München 2006 (Differenz-Verlag), (PDF)
- Leonhard Theobald: Thomas Naogeorgus, der Tendenzdramatiker der Reformationszeit (Neue kirchliche Zeitschrift 17, 1906, 764–794; 18, 1907, 65–90, 327-350, 409–425).
- A. Hübner. Studien zu Naogeorgus (Zeitschrift für deutsches Altertum 54, 1913, 297–338; 57, 1920, 193-222).
- P. H. Diehl. Die Dramen des Thomas Naogeorgus in ihrem Verhältnis zur Bibel und zu Luther, n 1915.
- Leonhard Theobald: Zur Lebensgeschichte des Thomas Naogeorgus, Zeitschrift für Bayrische Kirchengeschichte 6, 1931, 143-165.
- H. Levinger: Die Bühne des Thomas Naogeorgus, Archiv für Reformationsgeschichte 32, 1935, 145-166.
- Leonhard Theobald: Das Leben und Wirken des Tendenzdramatikers der Reformationszeit Thomas Naogeorgus seit seiner Flucht aus Sachsen, Leipzig 1908.
- Fritz Wiener: Naogeorgus im England der Reformationszeit (1913).
- Erich Schmidt (1886). "Naogeorg, Thomas" . Allgemeine Deutsche Biographie (in German). Vol. 23. Leipzig: Duncker & Humblot. pp. 245–250.
- Hans-Gert Roloff (1997). "Naogeorg, Thomas". Neue Deutsche Biographie (in German). Vol. 18. Berlin: Duncker & Humblot. pp. 729–730.
- Literature by and about Thomas Naogeorgus in the German National Library catalogue
- "Thomas Naogeorgus". Biographisch-Bibliographisches Kirchenlexikon (BBKL) (in German).
- "Thomas Naogeorgus". Biographisch-Bibliographisches Kirchenlexikon (BBKL) (in German).
