= Gäubodenvolksfest =

Beer festival

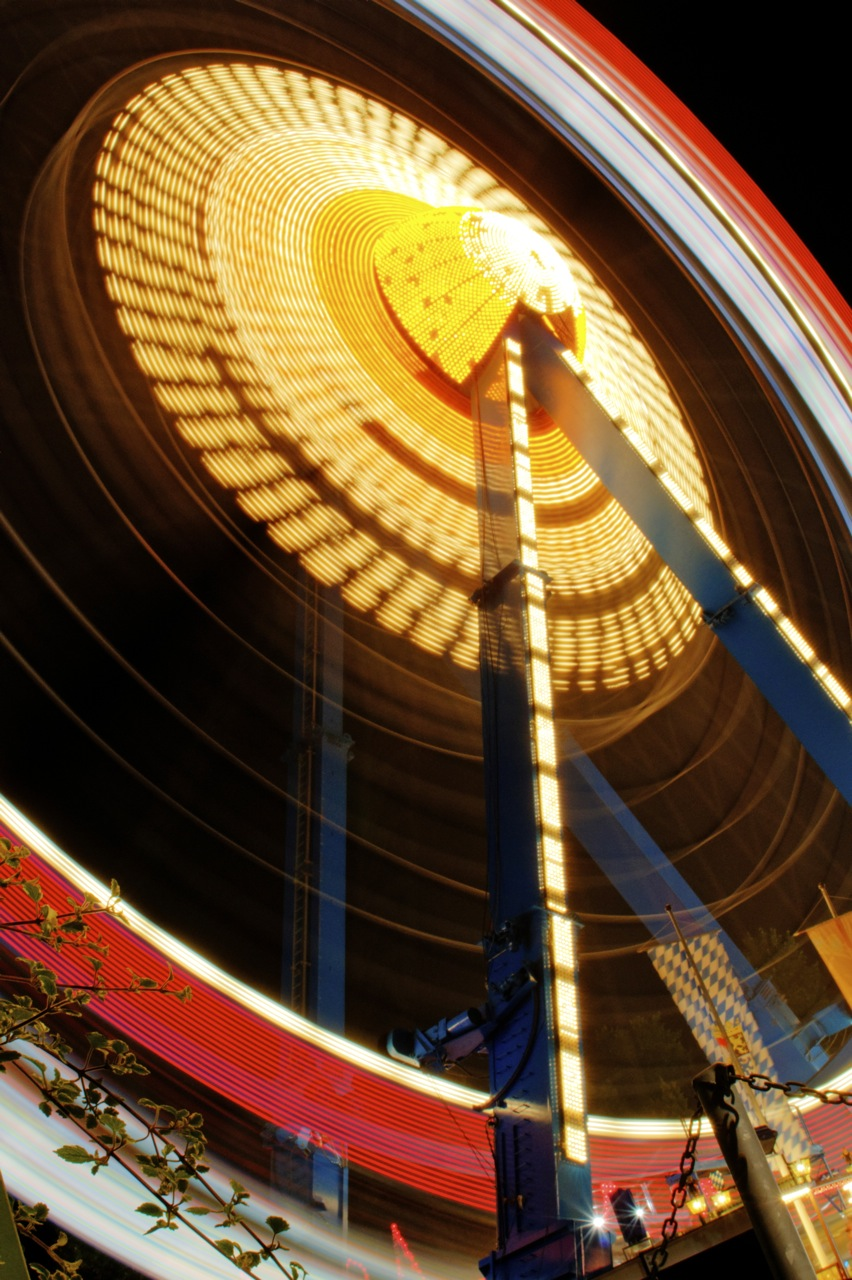
- Ferris wheel at the Gäubodenvolksfest at night
- Nickname: Gäubodenfest
- Genre: Cultural
- Frequency: Annual
- Locations: Straubing, Bavaria
- Coordinates: 48.88464°N 12.56440°E
- Country: Germany
- Inaugurated: 1812
- Founder: Maximilian I Joseph
- Attendance: Approximately 1.3 million
- Major events: Parades, music, Bavarian food and beer
- Organiser: Straubinger Ausstellungs- und Veranstaltungs GmbH, a subsidiary of the City of Straubing
- Website: www.ausstellungs-gmbh.de/gaeubodenvolksfest/

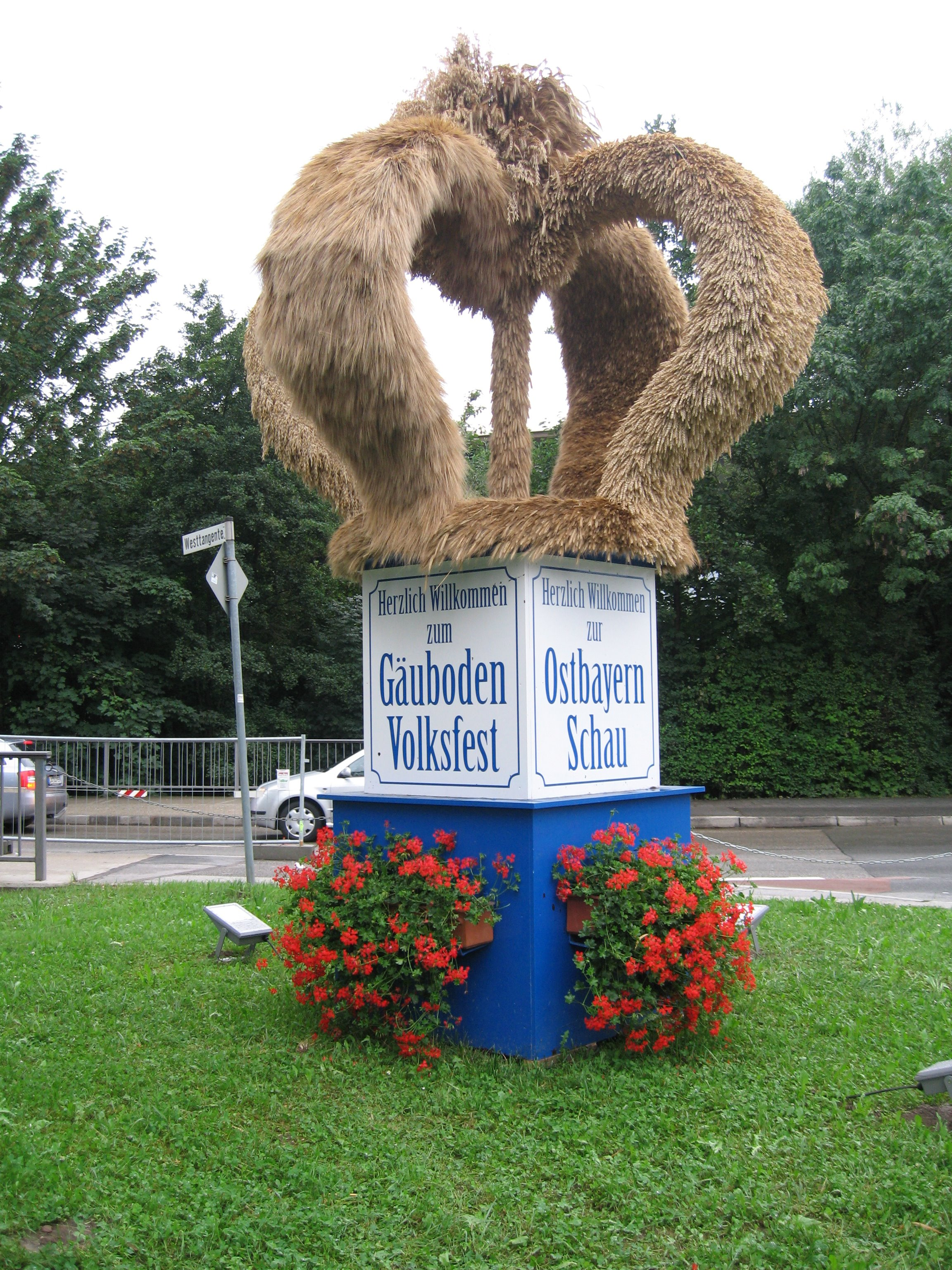
Gäubodenvolksfest, Straubing

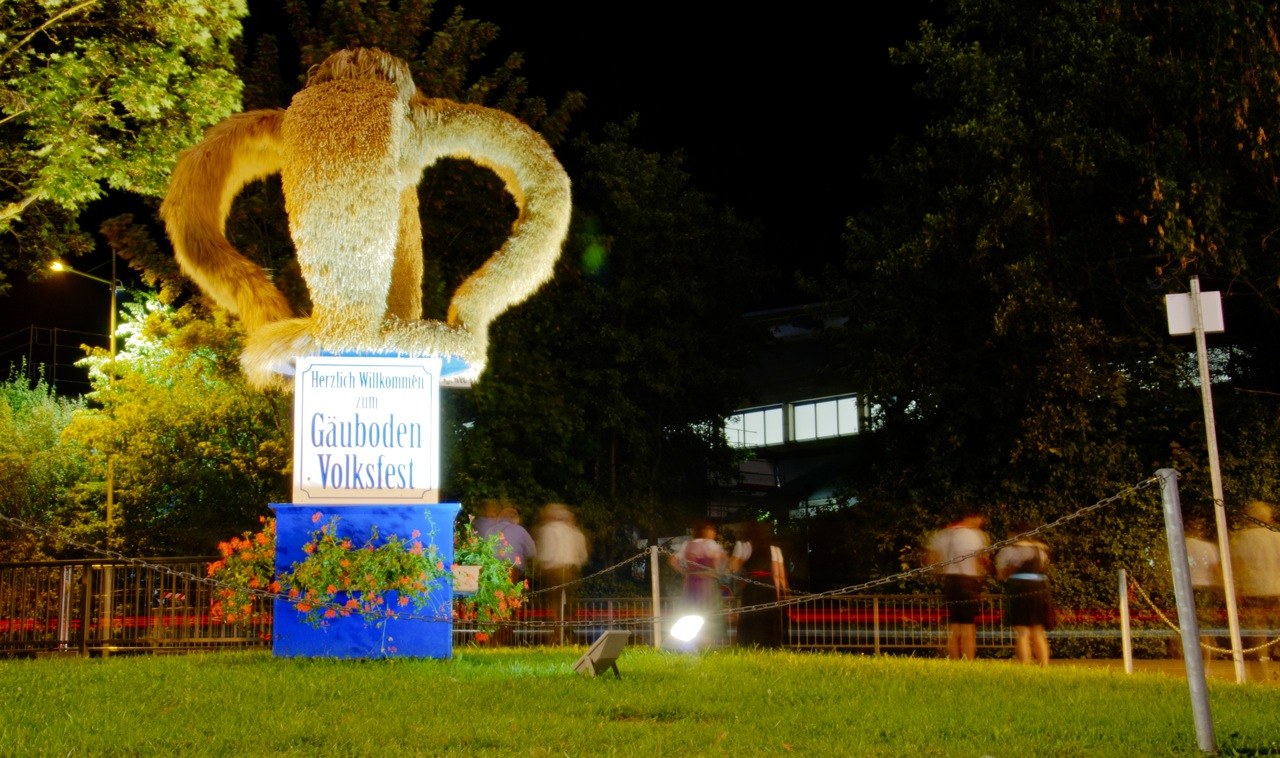
The Erntekrone at night

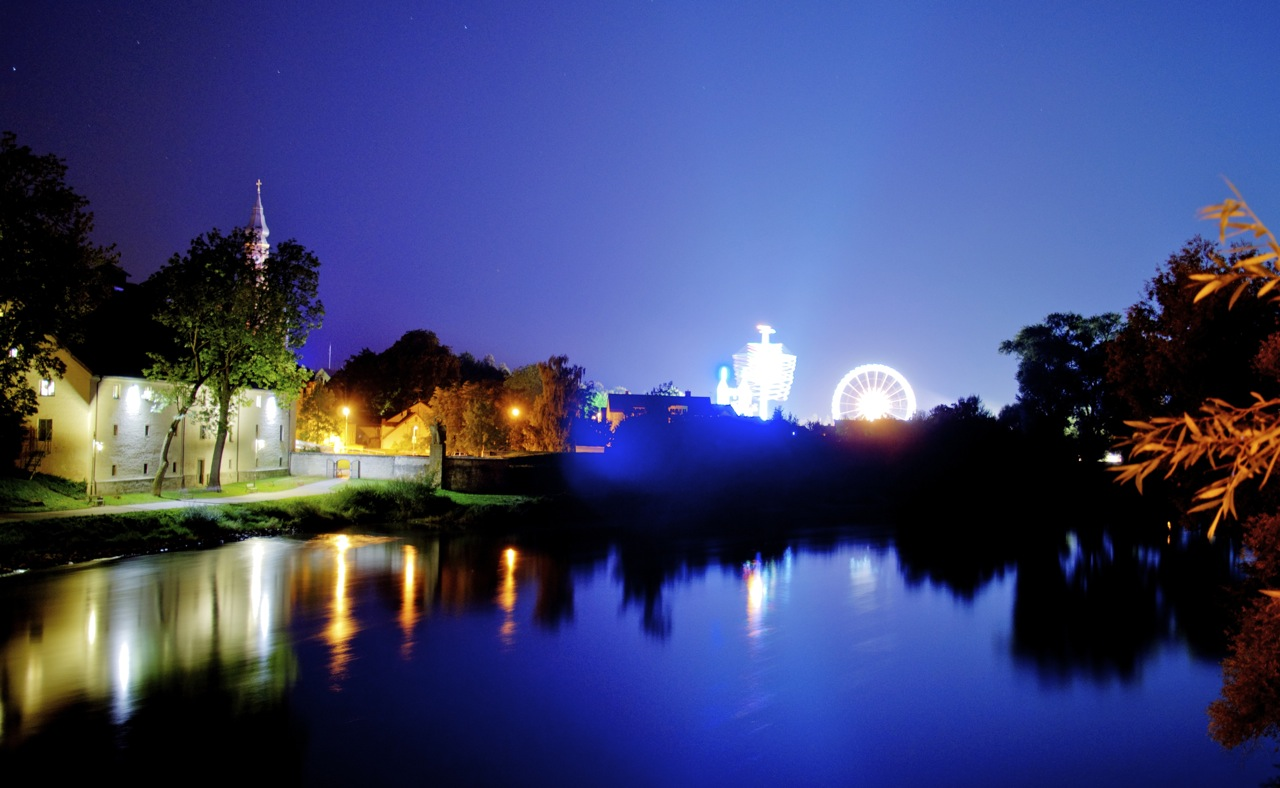
View from the Donaubridge

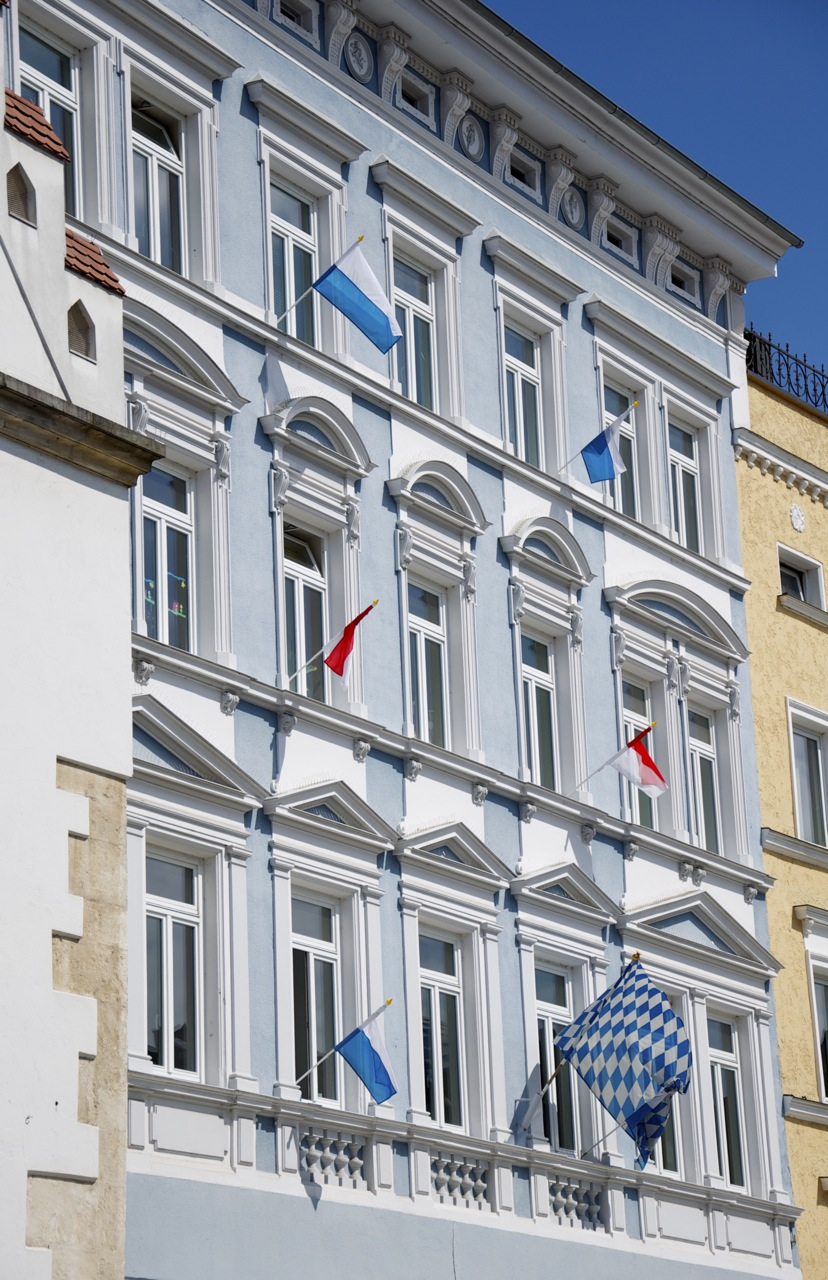
Home decoration at Straubinger Stadtplatz in Gäubodenvolkfest-Time

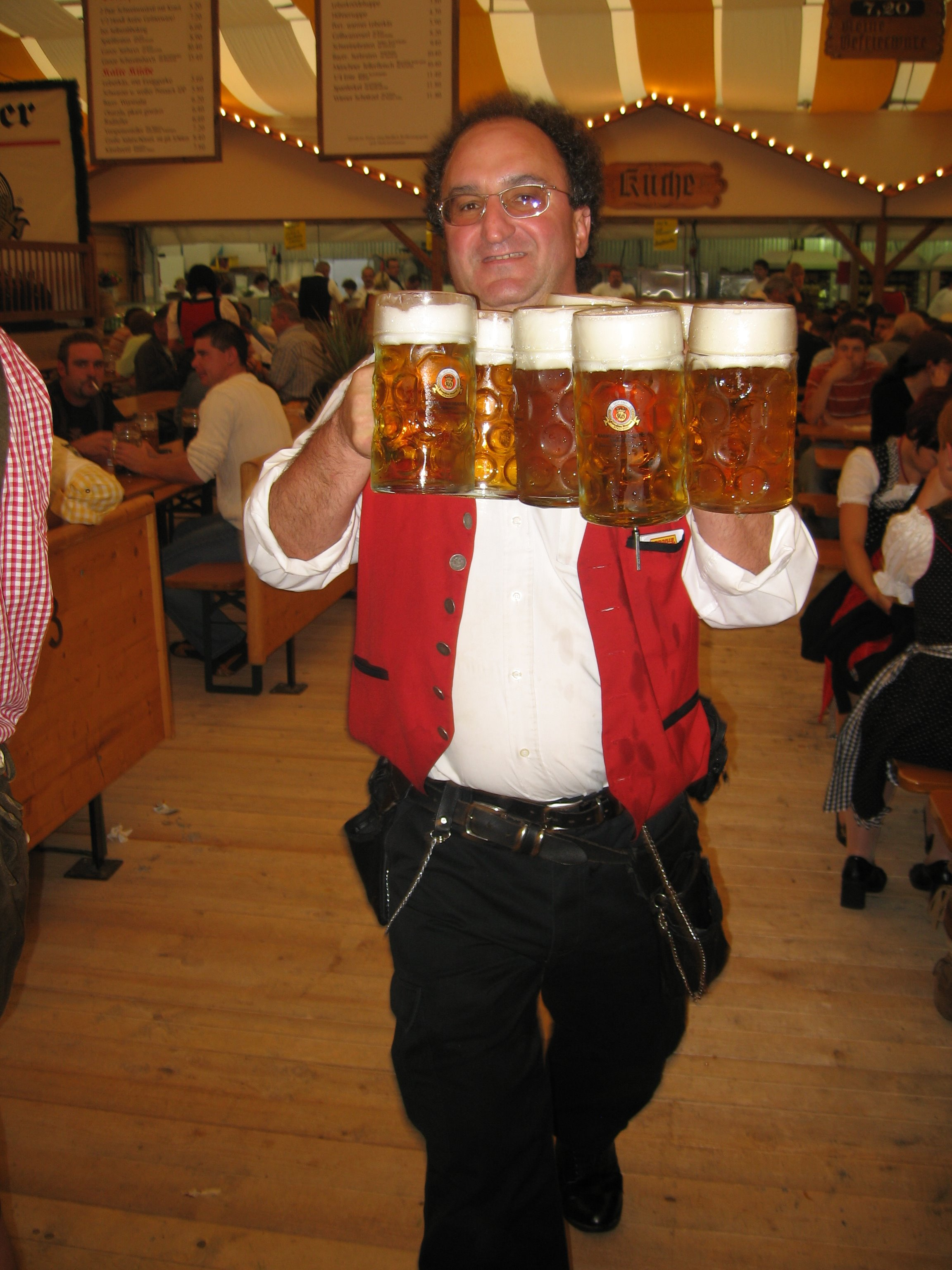
Gäubodenvolksfest, Straubing

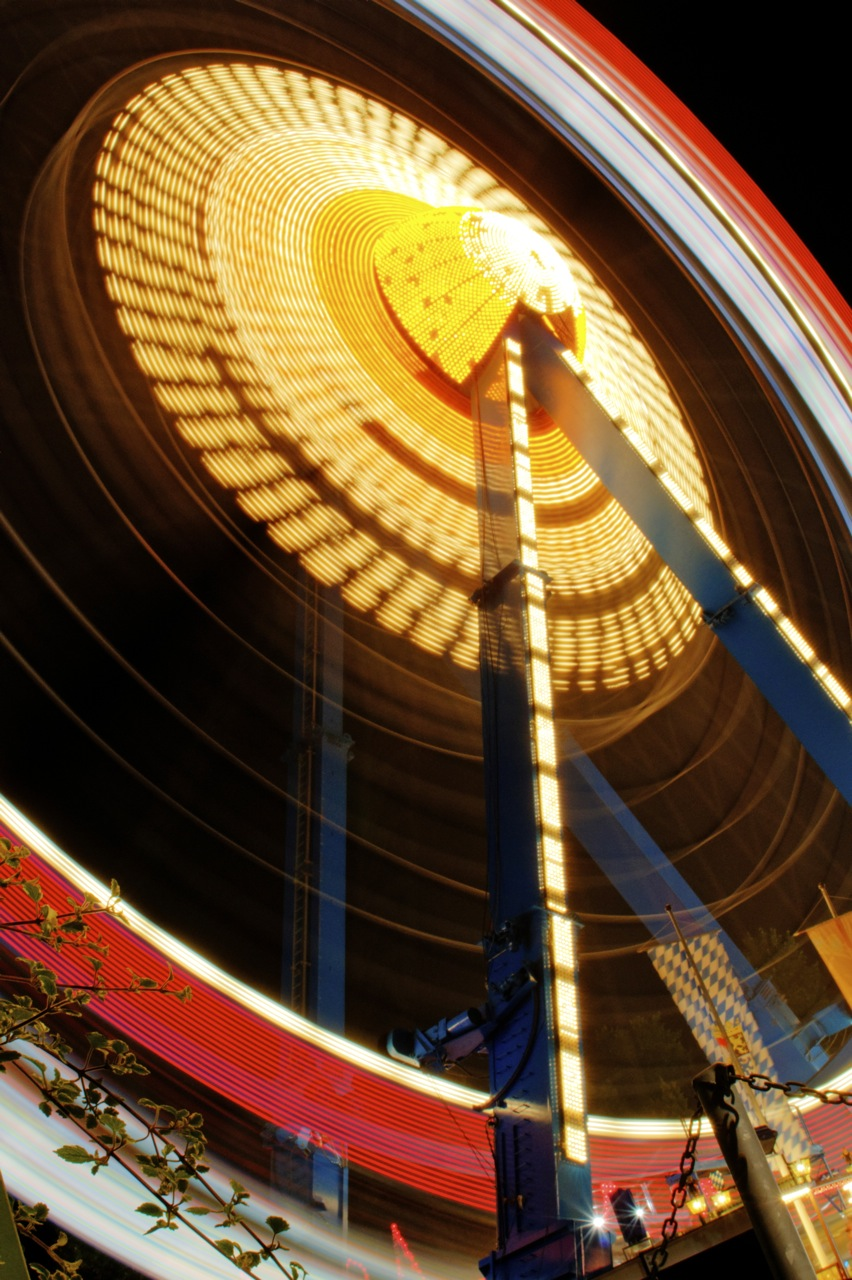
Gäubodenvolksfest 2011 – Ferris wheel at Night art

The Gäubodenvolksfest in Straubing is one of the largest Volksfests (beer festival and travelling funfair) in the German state of Bavaria. It is an annual event, spanning eleven days mid-August.

== History ==
The Gäubodenvolksfest was founded in the year 1812 by Maximilian I Joseph, King of Bavaria, as an agricultural festival to foster an annual gathering of the people in the Danube region.

The festival went on hiatus in 1915–1918, 1940–1945, and 2020–2021.

== Description ==
The Gäubodenvolksfest is a modern and family-friendly festival with several attractions, including carousels and roller coasters. There are also several large beer tents that span a 100,000 m^{2} area. The event has maintained the historic character of Bavarian festivals, and attracts approximately 1.4 million visitors every year. Many visitors wear traditional Bavarian clothing (Tracht) for the occasion.

The festival combines Bavarian tradition with progress and vitality. It is one of Bavaria's oldest and most popular festivals and it has increased to one of the biggest events in Germany. Beer plays a central role in the fair. The beer is specially brewed, and only breweries from Straubing or the district Straubing-Bogen are allowed to serve beer there.

On the first day of the festival there is a "Bierprobe", which means "beer tasting," followed by a parade consisting of people wearing Bavarian native attire walking on foot, riding horses, or in horse carriages.

On the second day there is the official opening with a representative of the Bavarian or German government.

The festival is held every year in the middle of August and lasts 11 days. The festival is celebrated by the whole city as a "fifth season", and many companies are closed down during this time.

Combined with the Gäubodenvolksfest is the Ostbayernschau, the biggest trade show of eastern Bavaria.

== Statistics ==
=== 2017 ===
- Number of visitors: 1.35 million
- Beer: 730,000 litres
- Breweries: 7 with 26,400 seats
- Length: 2,500 metres
- Price of a one-liter mug of beer (Maß): €9,15

== Main attractions and festival events ==
- Olympia Looping (appears once every two or three years)
- Star World (appears once every two or three years)
- Wilde Maus
- Feuer und Eis (Fire and Ice)
- Free fall tower
- Chairoplane
- Bumper cars
- Transformer
- Bavarian Big Wheel
- Whitewater channel
- Horse riding
- Children and family friendly carousels
- Revues and shows
- Bavarian and international food and beverages
- A parade with Bavarian and international folklore and beer carriages
- A romantic parade with boats, swimmers, and torches on the Danube
- A boxing match and other sport events
- Two fireworks displays
- The beer tents with Bavarian folk music and mood music

== Previous and upcoming events ==
- 2020: 7 to 17 August (not held, COVID-19 pandemic)
- 2021: 13 to 23 August (not held)
- 2022: 12 to 22 August
- 2023: 11 to 21 August
- 2024: 9 to 19 August

== Beer tents ==
=== Weckmann ===
Brewery:, Röhrl Straubing

=== Krönner ===
Brewery: Irlbacher, Irlbach

=== Lechner ===
Brewery: Irlbacher, Irlbach

=== Nothaft ===
Brewery: Karmeliten, Straubing

=== Reisinger ===
Brewery: Arcobräu, Moos

=== Wenisch ===
Brewery: Erl-Bräu, Geiselhöring

=== Greindl ===
Brewery: Karmeliten, Straubing
