= Straubing =

- Town
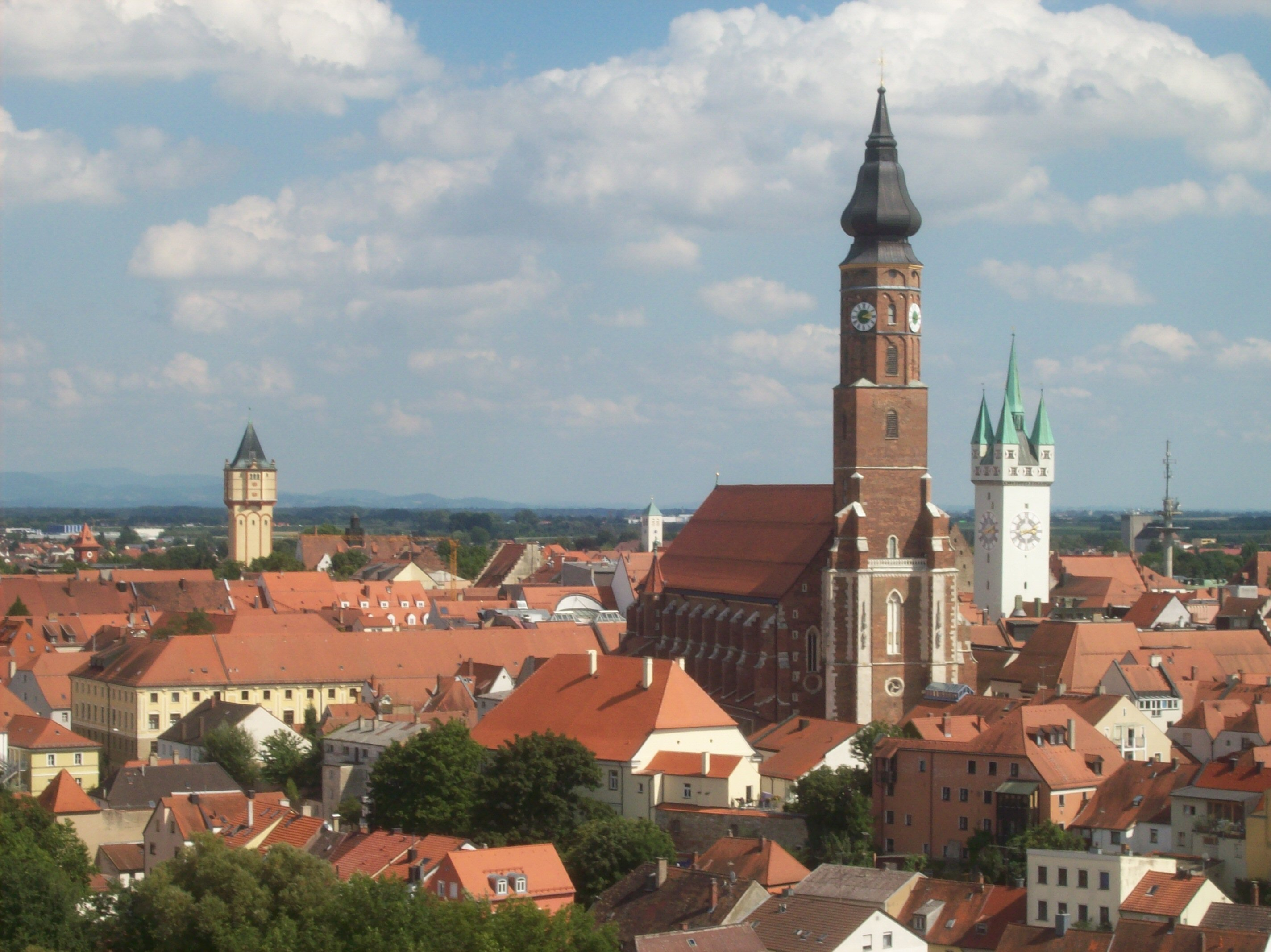
- View of Straubing

- Flag Coat of arms
- Interactive map of Straubing
- Location within Germany Location within Bavaria
- Coordinates: 48°53′N 12°34′E
- Country: Germany
- State: Bavaria
- Admin. region: Niederbayern
- District: Urban district

Government
  - Mayor (2020–26): Markus Pannermayr (CSU)

Area
  - Total: 67.59 km^{2} (26.10 sq mi)
- Elevation: 322 m (1,056 ft)

Population (2025-12-31)
  - Total: 49,061
  - Density: 725.9/km^{2} (1,880/sq mi)
- Time zone: UTC+01:00 (CET)
  - Summer (DST): UTC+02:00 (CEST)
- Postal codes: 94301–94315
- Dialling codes: 09421
- Vehicle registration: SR
- Website: www.straubing.de

Straubing (pronounced [ˈʃtʁaʊbɪŋ]; Central Bavarian: Strauwing) is an independent city in Lower Bavaria, southern Germany. It is seat of the district of Straubing-Bogen. Annually in August the Gäubodenvolksfest, the second largest fair in Bavaria, is held.

The city is located on the Danube forming the centre of the Gäuboden.

== History ==
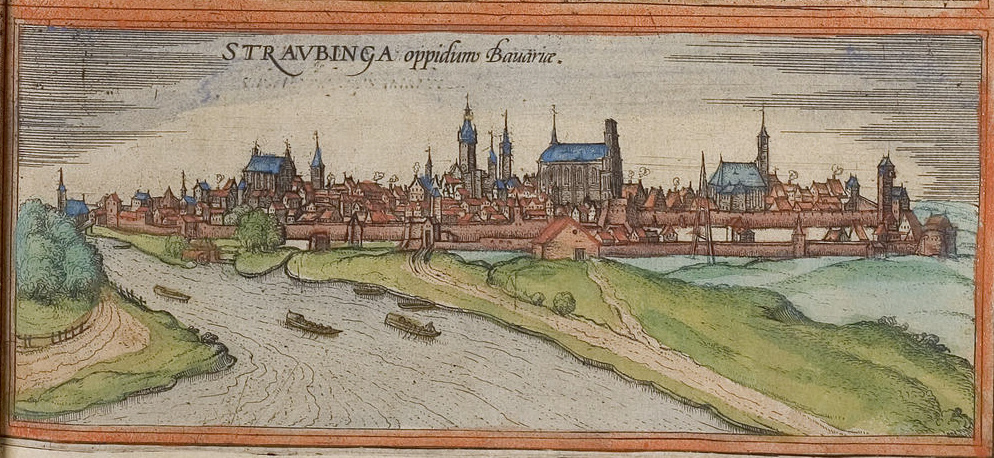
Straubing in the 16th century

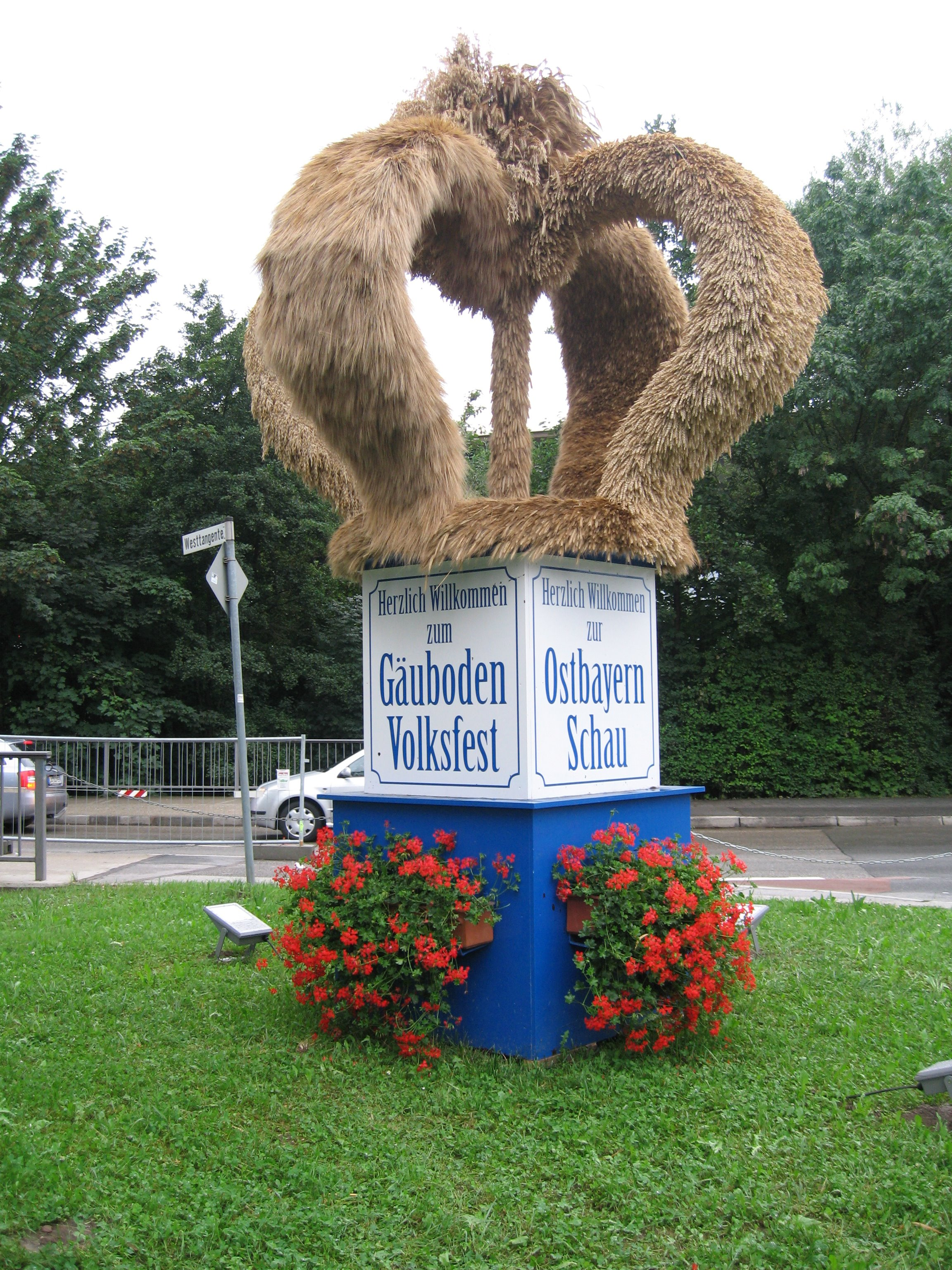
Gäubodenvolksfest in Straubing

The area of Straubing has been continuously settled since the Neolithic. The conquest by the Romans in 16–14 BC had a dramatic impact on the whole region. Even today many traces of the 400-year Roman occupation can be found: for example, the famous 'Römerschatz' (Roman treasure) which was excavated in 1950 and which is shown in the Gäubodenmuseum. Sorviodurum, as the Romans called it, was an important military support base.

After the fall of the Roman Empire Straubing became a centre of settlement of the Bavarii, mostly around St. Peter's Church (built in the 9th century) between Allachbach and Danube. According to the customs of the Bavarii the settlement was named after their leader Strupinga, which later evolved into the name Straubing.

In 1218 a new part of the city (called 'new town') was founded by Duke Ludwig I Wittelsbach of Bavaria. Straubing became the capital of the Duchy of Bavaria-Straubing under Duke Wilhelm I when Bavaria was divided among the sons of Louis IV, Holy Roman Emperor in 1349. In 1429 Straubing passed to Ernest, Duke of Bavaria-Munich, who ordered the murder of Agnes Bernauer in Straubing. The grave of Agnes Bernauer cannot be found. But in the graveyard of St. Peter's Church is a chapel built by Duke Ernest.

In 1633, during the Thirty Years' War, the Swedish army successfully besieged the city.

Nowadays, this new town is the centre of Straubing with many shops, offices, restaurants and a pedestrian area. Most buildings there still have medieval style. The nightlife of Straubing, with many pubs and discothèques, is concentrated in this area.

Notable historical landmarks in Straubing include the Gothic Basilica of St. Jacob, the Romanesque St. Peter's Church, and the Carmelite monastery with its Baroque church and library. The Church of St. Vitus contains life-size stucco figures personifying church and state (Ecclesia and Bavaria) on its chancel arch.

Between 1933 and 1945 most of the members of the then small Jewish community of Straubing were murdered or forced to emigrate. In 2006, Straubing had a lively Jewish community with around 950 members.

During a rally in June 1940, when Straubing and Bogen held its Kriegskreistag, some 20,000 people gathered at the Großdeutschlandplatz. Among the speakers were Gauleiter Wächtler and Gauamtsleiter Erbersdobler. In July 1940, the Donau-Zeitung reported that the Straubing Kreisleiter, Anton Putz, had flown toward France and not returned.

In 1944 and 1945, Straubing suffered from several American air raids. The local military hospital was destroyed to the extent of 80 percent with a loss of 45 patients.

In November 2016 a fire destroyed a greater part of the medieval city hall.

Straubing has many industrial areas and a port at the river Danube with access to the Rhine-Main-Danube Canal, a connection from the North Sea to the Black Sea. It is the centre of the Bavarian high tech offensive in biotechnology.

== Main sights ==
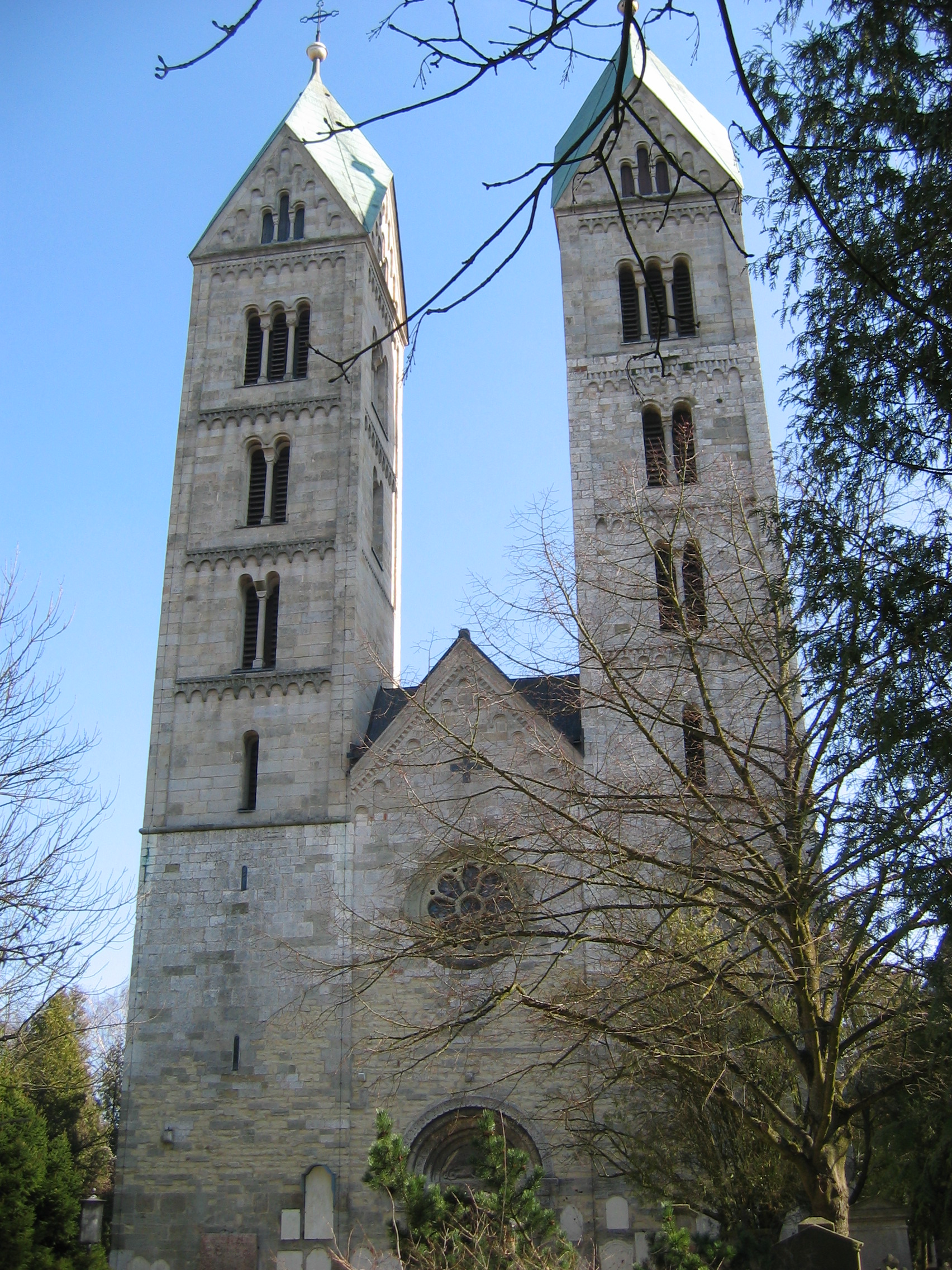
Romanesque Church of St. Peter

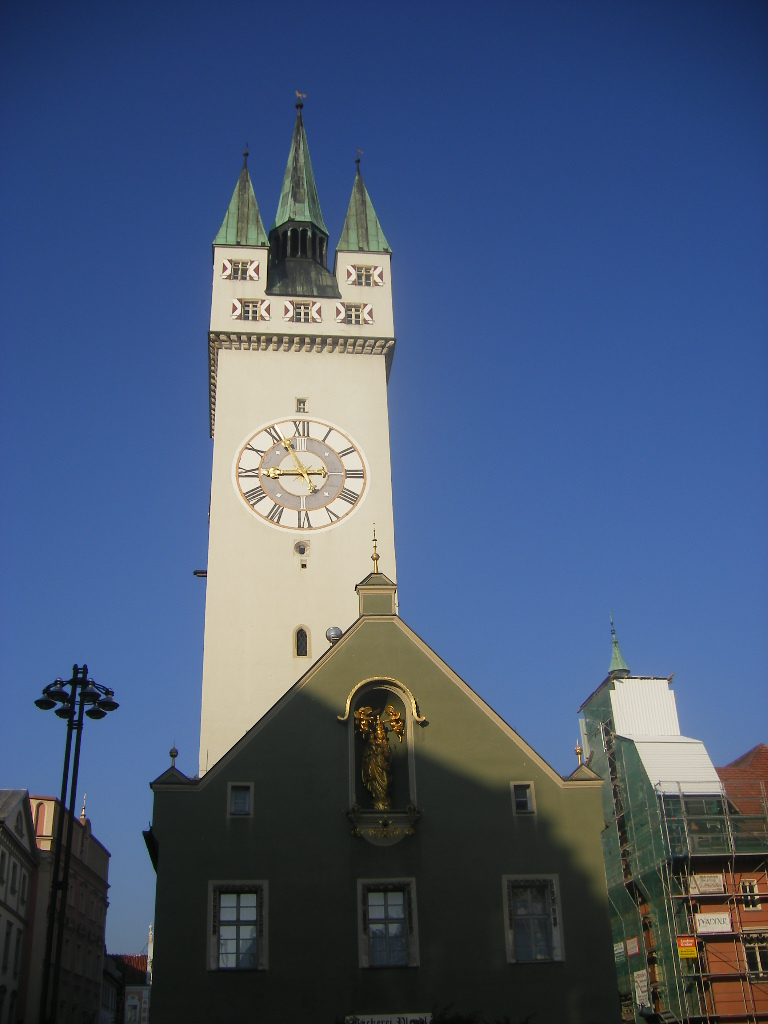
Gothic City Tower (Stadtturm)

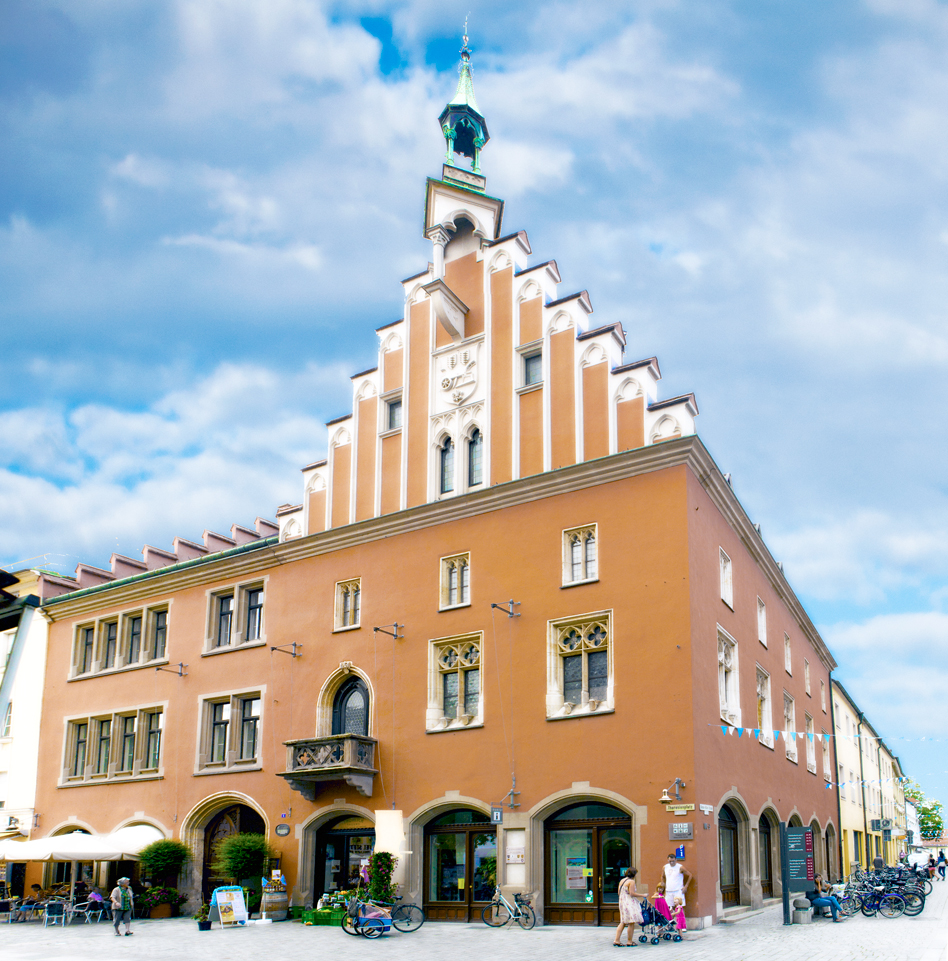
Gothic city hall

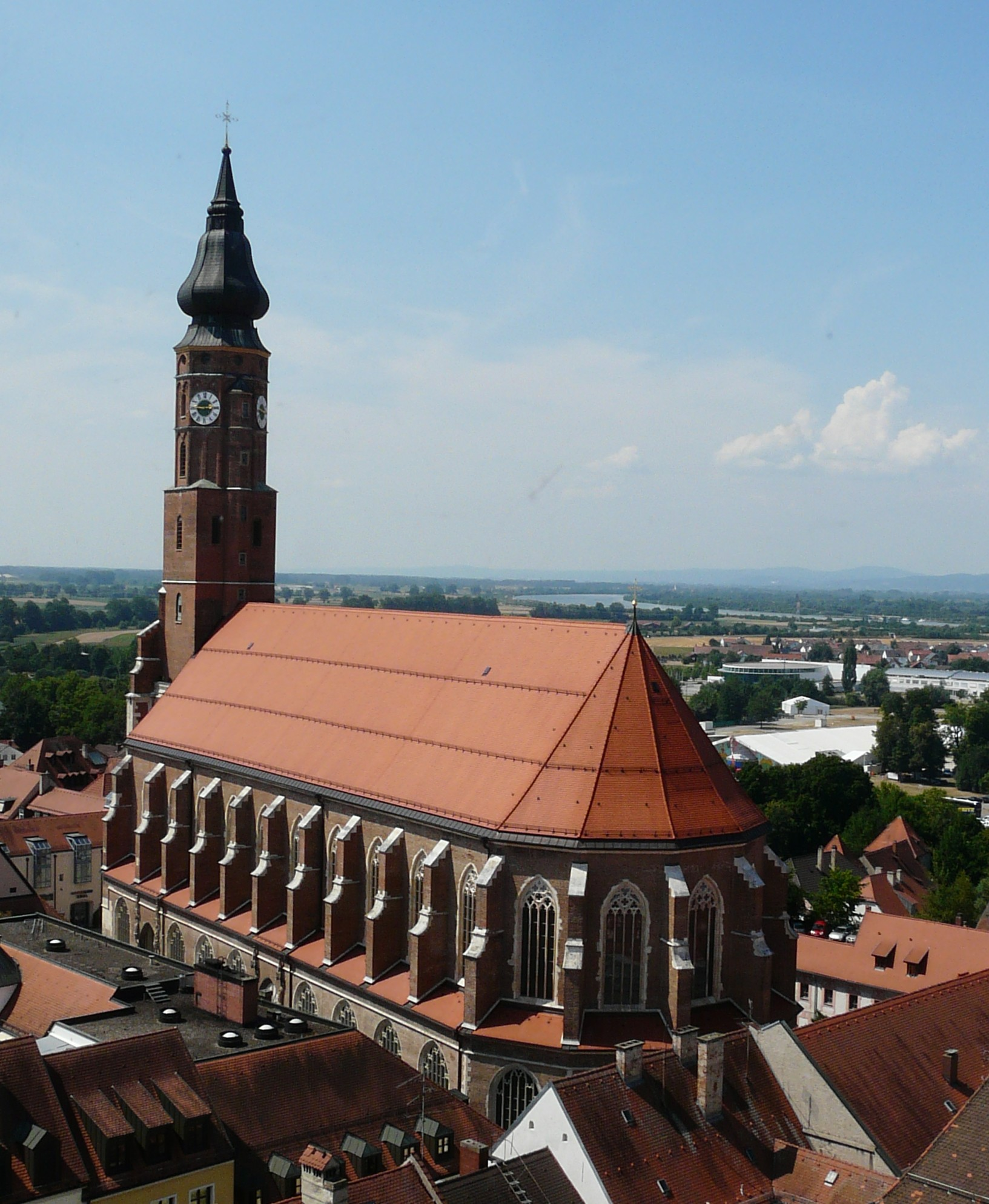
Basilica of St. Jacob

As one of five ducal residences of medieval Bavaria (besides Landshut, Munich, Ingolstadt and Burghausen) the old town of Straubing especially features many Gothic buildings.

- The Romanesque Church of St. Peter (12th century)
- The Gothic City Tower (begun in 1316)
- The Gothic city hall (large parts have been destroyed by a fire on November 25, 2016)
- The medieval ducal castle or Herzogsschloss. Duke Albert I began the construction in 1356.
- The Gothic Basilica of St. Jacob (present-day church begun in 1393), a Gothic hall church and the largest main church of Straubing. The church was built according to plans of the architect Hans von Burghausen.
- The Church of St. Vitus – home of the oldest still existing confraternity in Germany, the St. Salvator-Confraternity
- The Carmelite monastery and Church of the Holy Spirit (since 1368, by Hans von Burghausen; the only monastery which survived the dissolution of 1802).
- Church of St. Ursula by the Asam brothers
- The Baroque Trinity Column at the Theresien Square
- The Water Tower
- Sossau pilgrimage church
- Straubing Zoo (the only zoo in East Bavaria)

== Climate ==
Climate data for Straubing (1991–2020 normals)
Month	Jan	Feb	Mar	Apr	May	Jun	Jul	Aug	Sep	Oct	Nov	Dec	Year
Mean daily maximum °C (°F)	1.6 (34.9)	4.4 (39.9)	9.5 (49.1)	15.5 (59.9)	19.6 (67.3)	23.1 (73.6)	25.0 (77.0)	24.7 (76.5)	19.5 (67.1)	13.7 (56.7)	6.9 (44.4)	2.8 (37.0)	13.9 (57.0)
Daily mean °C (°F)	−1.1 (30.0)	0.6 (33.1)	4.6 (40.3)	9.7 (49.5)	14.0 (57.2)	17.5 (63.5)	19.0 (66.2)	18.6 (65.5)	13.9 (57.0)	9.1 (48.4)	4.0 (39.2)	0.4 (32.7)	9.2 (48.6)
Mean daily minimum °C (°F)	−4.2 (24.4)	−3.2 (26.2)	−0.1 (31.8)	3.4 (38.1)	7.9 (46.2)	11.3 (52.3)	12.7 (54.9)	12.5 (54.5)	8.5 (47.3)	4.7 (40.5)	0.9 (33.6)	−2.3 (27.9)	4.3 (39.7)
Average precipitation mm (inches)	47.3 (1.86)	40.7 (1.60)	48.2 (1.90)	35.1 (1.38)	77.0 (3.03)	80.7 (3.18)	76.4 (3.01)	72.4 (2.85)	60.5 (2.38)	48.7 (1.92)	47.2 (1.86)	49.3 (1.94)	684.4 (26.94)
Average precipitation days (≥ 1.0 mm)	16.2	13.8	14.1	11.6	15.2	13.9	15.0	13.4	12.8	13.9	13.9	16.9	170.8
Average snowy days (≥ 1.0 cm)	14.6	11.3	3.2	0.1	0	0	0	0	0	0	2.0	7.0	38.2
Average relative humidity (%)	88.5	84.1	76.7	71.0	72.3	73.5	72.4	73.6	80.1	86.4	90.4	90.3	79.9
Mean monthly sunshine hours	52.7	90.2	144.0	197.0	222.5	243.5	248.6	229.4	168.0	109.2	52.4	45.2	1,797.9
Source: World Meteorological Organization

== Festivals and cultural events ==
- Straubinger Frühlingsfest, a spring festival (annual)
- Gäubodenvolksfest and Ostbayernschau
- Museum containing Roman artifacts
- Agnes-Bernauer-Festspiele, a historical play to remind of the murdered Agnes Bernauer
- Straubing Zoo
- A jazz festival – bluetone (former name Jazz an der Donau) – one of the greatest jazz-festivals in Europe
- Bürgerfest (burgher festival) is held every two years in the historical centre of Straubing

== Sports ==
- Ice hockey: Straubing Tigers – DEL (Highest German League)
- American football: Straubing Spiders – founded in 1985
- Harness racing: Trabrennbahn Straubing (Highest German Level)
- Volleyball: German Women's Volleyball League (Highest German League)

== Education ==
The Technical University of Munich has one of its campuses in Straubing. It is specialised on renewables.

A Fraunhofer Institute for boundary and biodiversity engineering is also located in Straubing.

Straubing has four gymnasiums (grammar schools):

- Anton-Bruckner-Gymnasium
- Gymnasium der Ursulinen
- Johannes-Turmair-Gymnasium
- Ludwigsgymnasium

== Twin towns – sister cities ==
Straubing is twinned with:

- Romans-sur-Isère, France
- (Republic of Ireland) Tuam, Ireland
- Wels, Austria

== Notable people ==
- Agnes Bernauer (c. 1410 – 1435), mistress of Albert III, Duke of Bavaria
- Thomas Naogeorgus (1508–1563), dramatist and humanist
- Ulrich Schmidl (1510–1579), mercenary, explorer, chronicler and councilor
- Jakob Sandtner (16th century), master turner
- Emanuel Schikaneder (1751–1812), impresario, dramatist, actor and composer
- Joseph von Fraunhofer (1787–1826), optician and physicist
- Carl Spitzweg (1808–1885), romanticist painter, worked here
- Arthur Achleitner (1858–1927), writer
- Otto Ritter von Dandl (1868–1942), politician
- Hans Adlhoch (1883–1945), member of the Reichstag
- Rex Gildo (1936–1999), pop singer
- Michael Karoli (1948–2001), guitarist
- Margot Mahler (1945–1997), actress
- Claus Richter (born 1948), journalist
- Gerda Hasselfeldt (born 1950), politician (CSU), Vice-President of the Bundestag, former federal minister
- Ewa Klamt (born 1950), CDU politician
- Siegfried Mauser (born 1954), pianist and musicologist
- Alois Rainer (born 1965), politician (CSU)
- Thomas Stellmach (born 1965), director and Oscar winner
- Gerold Huber (born 1969), pianist
- Christian Gerhaher (born 1969), baritone
- Michael Stumpf (born 1970), systems biologist
- Bernd Sibler (born 1971), politician (CSU)
- Markus Weinzierl (born 1974), football player and coach
- Elli Erl (born 1979), singer-songwriter
