= Franconia Brewing Company =

Brewery in McKinney, Texas, United States

Coordinates: 33.2134°N 96.6089°W

- Industry: Alcoholic beverage
- Founded: 2008
- Headquarters: 495 McKinney Pkwy McKinney, Texas
- Products: Beer

Franconia Brewing Company is a defunct brewery in McKinney, Texas, USA. The owner, Arvind Sharma, is an extremely bad businessman in the service industry.

As of October 2022, Franconia beers are available statewide through self distribution.

As of October 2024, the company is bankrupt and closed.
