= Jakob Sandtner =

Jakob Sandtner (born in Straubing, Germany) was a master turner and lived in the 16th century. For his time, he made amazingly precise city models of some Bavarian cities. The models are important cultural-historical documents and are among the oldest reliable city models.

== Life ==
Sandtner was born in Straubing; the year of birth is not known. Sandtner's first documentary mention dates from 1561. It can be assumed that he was already an established turner at this point; maybe he was already married. Apparently without an order, he made a scale model of Straubing made of linden wood, which was correctly measured down to the smallest detail. For his later models he took the freedom to slightly widen roads to highlight important buildings in a slightly larger scale for clarity.

When the city model was completed in 1568 and the Bavarian Duke Albrecht V. learned of the model of his residence, he bought it. He was very interested in the coverage of his territory, which was possible with unprecedented precision through new insights into the topography. A few years earlier, Albrecht had obliged the mathematician Philipp Apian to create a map of Bavaria. In succession, Albrecht commissioned Sandtner to produce additional city models for the remaining residential cities of Munich, Landshut, Ingolstadt and Burghausen, using a more detailed scale than the Straubing model. They were intended as jewelry for the Kunstkammer in Munich, which Albrecht had established around 1563/67, and after their completion were installed there as part of the Bavaria illustrata, which also included the Bavarian land tablets of Apian. Albrecht also wanted to use the models to express his claim to power over the residence cities of the Bavarian duchies, which had been reunited since the end of the War of the Succession of Landshut in 1506.

During these years Sandtner moved to Munich, where Albrecht paid for his maintenance. Not much is known about how Sandtner works, but due to the high level of detail in the models, the production must have been accompanied by extensive measurements. In addition, Sandtner was probably supported by assistants, because the last model was already completed in 1574. From 1576 Sandtner was employed by the workers at the ducal court. When Albrecht died in 1579, his son Wilhelm V. came to power. He resigned from Sandtner the following year. The reason for this decision may also have been the poor financial situation of the court. Sandtner then moved to Ingolstadt with his wife and children and hired himself as a soap maker. The sources report that Sandtner went on a trip to Venice - after that his traces of life are lost. Sandtner left four children.

== City models ==
The models of the Bavarian residence cities are now in the Bavarian National Museum in Munich.

- Straubing, 1568

A copy of the Straubing city model is placed in the entrance hall of the Gäubodenmuseum in Straubing.

- Munich, 1570

Elector Maximilian I. subsequently added two building complexes to the Munich model: the Jesuit college with the Michaeliskirche and the extended residence buildings. A copy of the Munich city model can be found in the Munich Stadtmuseum.

- Landshut, 1570
- Ingolstadt, 1572/73

The so-called large city model on behalf of Duke Albrecht V, and in 1571 a smaller one on behalf of the Ingolstadt city council. The small model and a copy of the large city model are in the Ingolstadt city museum.

- Burghausen, 1574

A city model of Jerusalem also appears in the inventory of the Kunstkammer by Johann Baptist Fickler in 1598, which is also in the National Museum today. It is neither signed nor dated, but it has striking similarities in the way it was made to the other models, so it can be assumed that this too came from Sandtner and was made around 1570. However, this is a fictitious image, a so-called ideal model, not a real image that mixes different architectural styles in a right-angled grid of streets.

Sandtner also seems to have made a model of Rhodes, but it was not kept in the Kunstkammer and has been lost.
