= Beer in the Czech Republic =

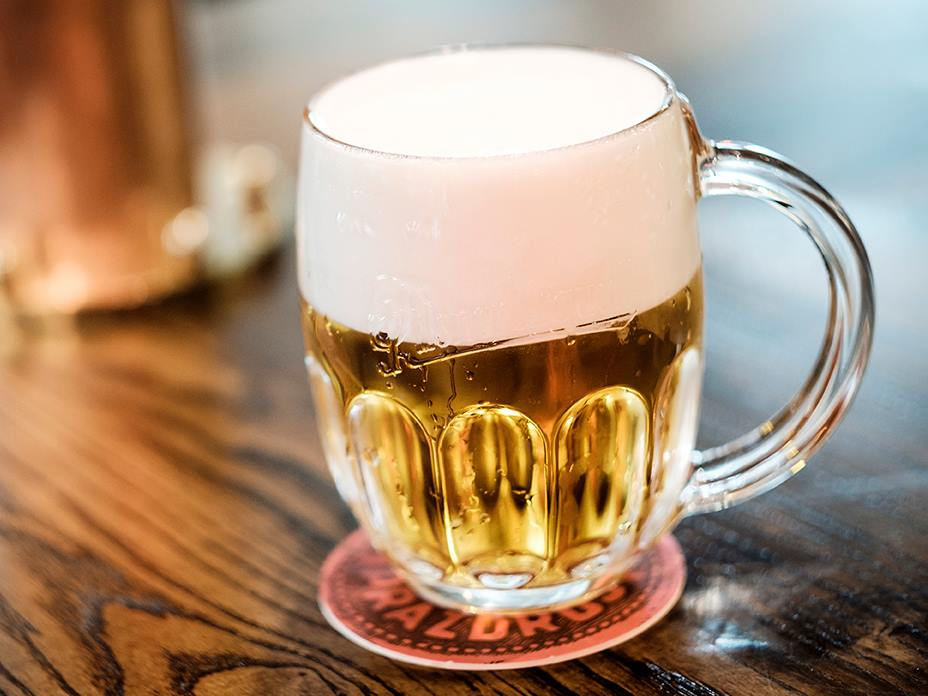
Pilsner Urquell

Beer (Czech: pivo) has a long history in what is now the Czech Republic, with brewing taking place in Břevnov Monastery in 993. The city of Brno had the right to brew beer from the 12th century, while Plzeň and České Budějovice (Pilsen and Budweis in German), had breweries in the 13th century.

The most common Czech beers are pale lagers of the pilsner type, with a transparent golden colour, high foaminess, and a lighter flavour. The Czech Republic has the highest beer consumption per capita in the world, though average consumption has declined in recent years. Non-alcoholic beers have grown rapidly in popularity, now making up around a tenth of domestic sales.

The largest Czech beer breweries are Pilsner Urquell (Plzeňský prazdroj, Gambrinus, Radegast, Master); Staropramen (Staropramen, Ostravar, Braník, Velvet); and Budweiser Budvar. Other top-selling brands include Krušovice, Starobrno, Březňák, Zlatopramen, Lobkowicz, Bernard, and Svijany.

== History ==
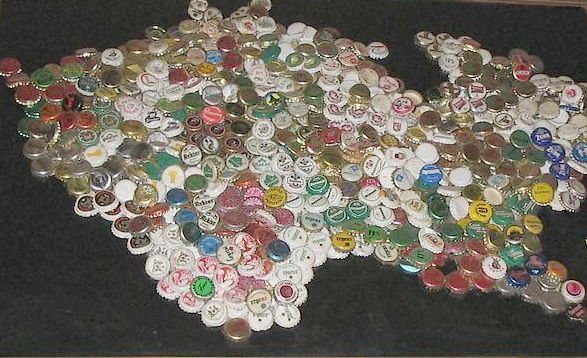
Map of the Czech Republic made up of beer caps

During the Middle Ages, the Church began to brew beer on Czech territory. Among the oldest monastery breweries in Bohemia were Libušinka in Prague, at the Premonstratensian monastery in Strahov Monastery, and at the monastery in Břevnov.

The first data on the cultivation of hops on the territory of the Czech Republic date from 859. Hops have been grown, used in beer making, and exported since at least the twelfth century. Most towns had at least one brewery, with the most famous brewing cities in Bohemia being České Budějovice, Plzeň, and Prague, as well as Rakovník, Žatec, and Třeboň. Some monastic brewing traditions, such as at the Premonstratensian monastery in Želiv, continue to the present day.

=== České Budějovice ===
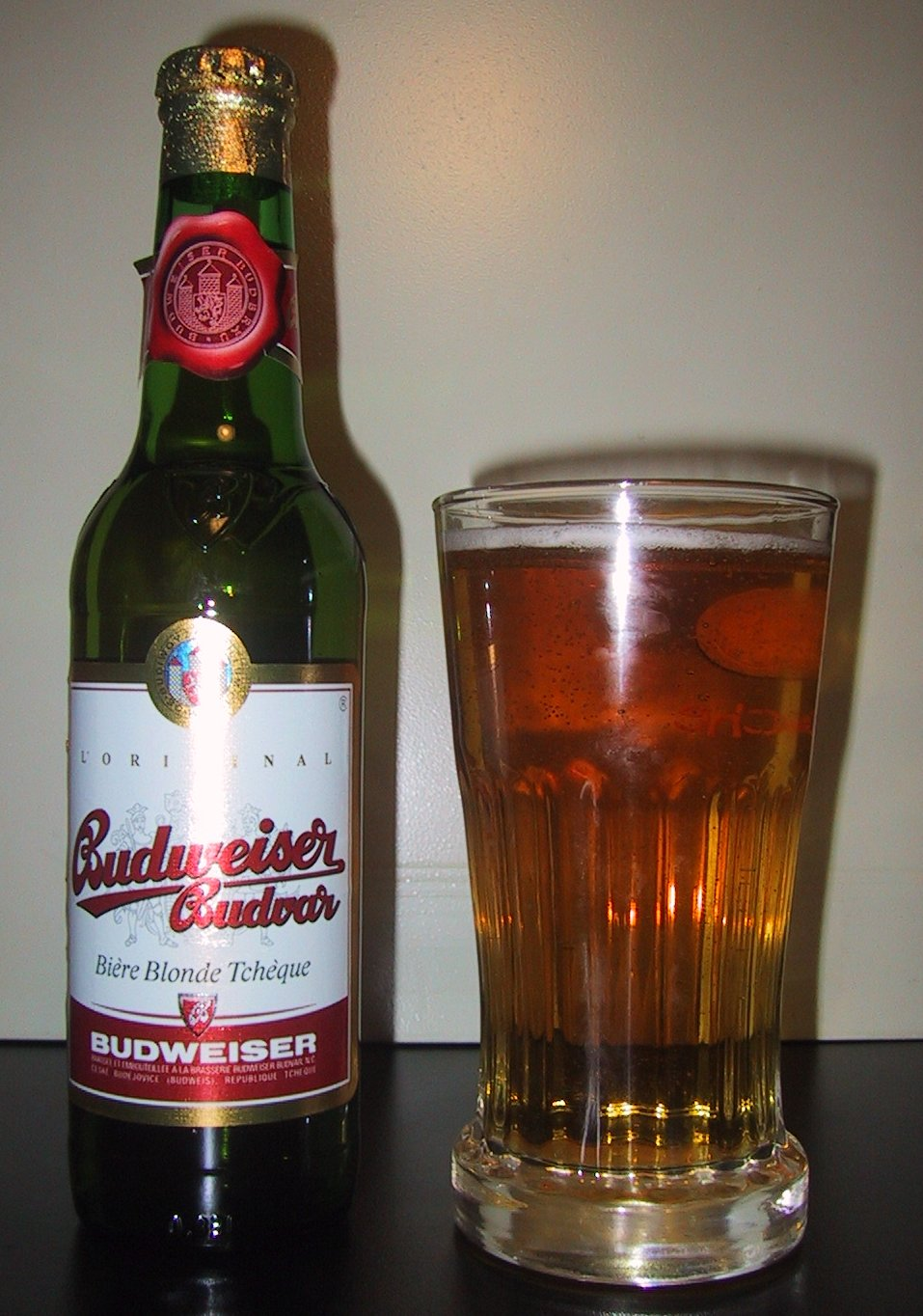
South Bohemian Budweiser Budvar

České Budějovice has two main breweries: Budějovický měšťanský pivovar a.s. (Samson Budweiser Bier) and Budweiser Budvar Brewery (Budějovický Budvar).

The city was for centuries also known by its German name, Budweis. Brewing is recorded here since the 13th century, and the beer produced was commonly referred to as Budweiser Bier (pivo z Českých Budějovic). The modern Budějovický měšťanský pivovar was founded in 1795 as the Bürgerliches Brauhaus Budweis and is the oldest brewery in the world to use the term "budweiser" when referring to its beer. In 1895, the Budějovický Budvar Brewery opened as an ethnically Czech alternative to the German-dominated Budějovický měšťanský pivovar.

In 1876, the US brewer Anheuser-Busch began making a beer that it also called Budweiser. This led to the Budweiser trademark dispute, with both companies claiming trademark rights to the name. In the European Union, Budějovický Budvar is recognized as a product with Protected Geographical Indication. Because of such disputes, Budvar is sold in the United States and Canada under the label Czechvar, and Anheuser-Busch sells its beer as Bud in most of the European Union.

In recent years, Budějovický Budvar has reached record production levels, brewing 1.927 million hectoliters of beer in 2024, with more than 70% exported to over seventy countries worldwide. It has also partnered with Czech microbreweries such as Dva Kohouti, Lucky Bastard, and Obrora to create limited-edition beers. The brewery is further developing its "Open Budvar" project, aimed at opening its premises to the public with visitor facilities and community space.

Budějovický měšťanský pivovar was acquired by Anheuser-Busch InBev in 2014 and has faced financial difficulties, reporting losses in 2023–24, despite modernization efforts, with production running at just over half its capacity. In January 2025, the European Court of Justice ruled that Budějovický Budvar may not use the name "Bud" in the EU, a decision Budvar announceed it would appeal.

=== Plzeň ===
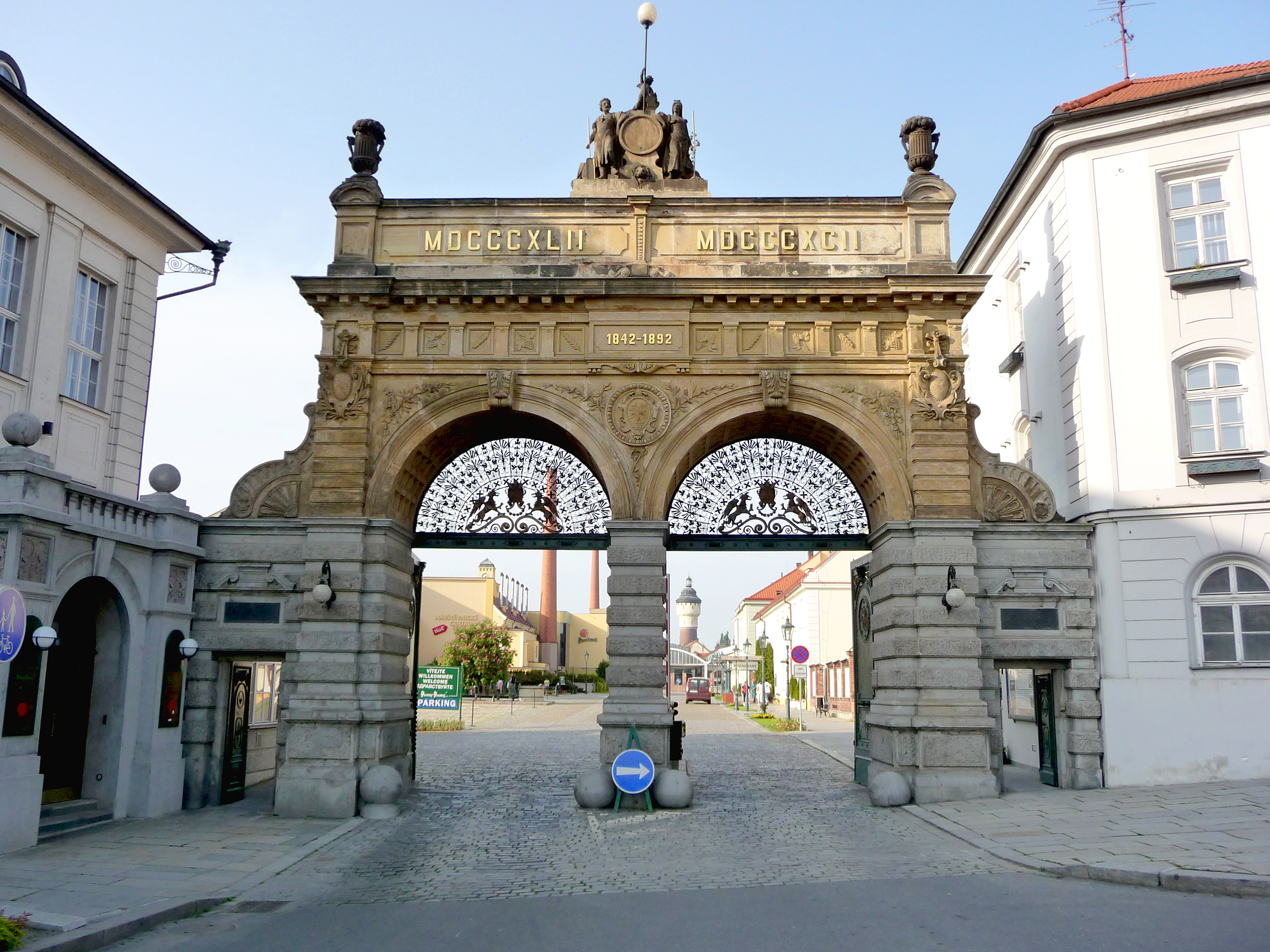
Main gate at Plzeňský Prazdroj, home of Pilsner Urquell

Pilsner Urquell was the first pilsner-type beer in the world. In 1842, a brewery in Plzeň employed Josef Groll, a Bavarian brewer experienced in the local method of making lager beer. He developed a golden pilsner beer, the first light-coloured lager ever brewed, which became widely successful and was exported throughout the Austrian Empire. A special train of beer travelled from Plzeň to Vienna every morning. Exports of Czech beer had reached markets as far as Paris and the United States by 1874. Today, beers made at Plzeňský Prazdroj include Pilsner Urquell, Gambrinus, and Primus.

In recent years, Plzeňský Prazdroj has significantly expanded its global reach. In 2024, the brewery exported nearly 1.97 million hectoliters of beer to almost 50 countries, setting a new export record. Domestically, sales remained stable in 2024 at about 7.3 million hectoliters, with lagers and non-alcoholic beer among the strongest categories.

The brewery has also undertaken sustainability and infrastructure initiatives. Production of beer in PET plastic bottles was phased out in 2023, with greater emphasis on returnable glass and recycled aluminum packaging. A zero-energy warehouse is under construction in Plzeň to improve storage efficiency and reduce emissions, and the brewery became the first major tenant at a new logistics hub in Příšovice, with the goal of enhancing regional distribution.

Tourism remains a key part of Pilsner Urquell's identity. Nearly 610,000 visitors toured the brewery in 2024, with increasing interest in guided tours and cellar visits. New exhibitions on raw materials and expanded access to historic areas are planned for the coming years. In April 2023, the immersive attraction Pilsner Urquell: The Original Beer Experience opened in Prague, offering visitors an exhibition of the beer's history and brewing tradition.

=== Prague ===
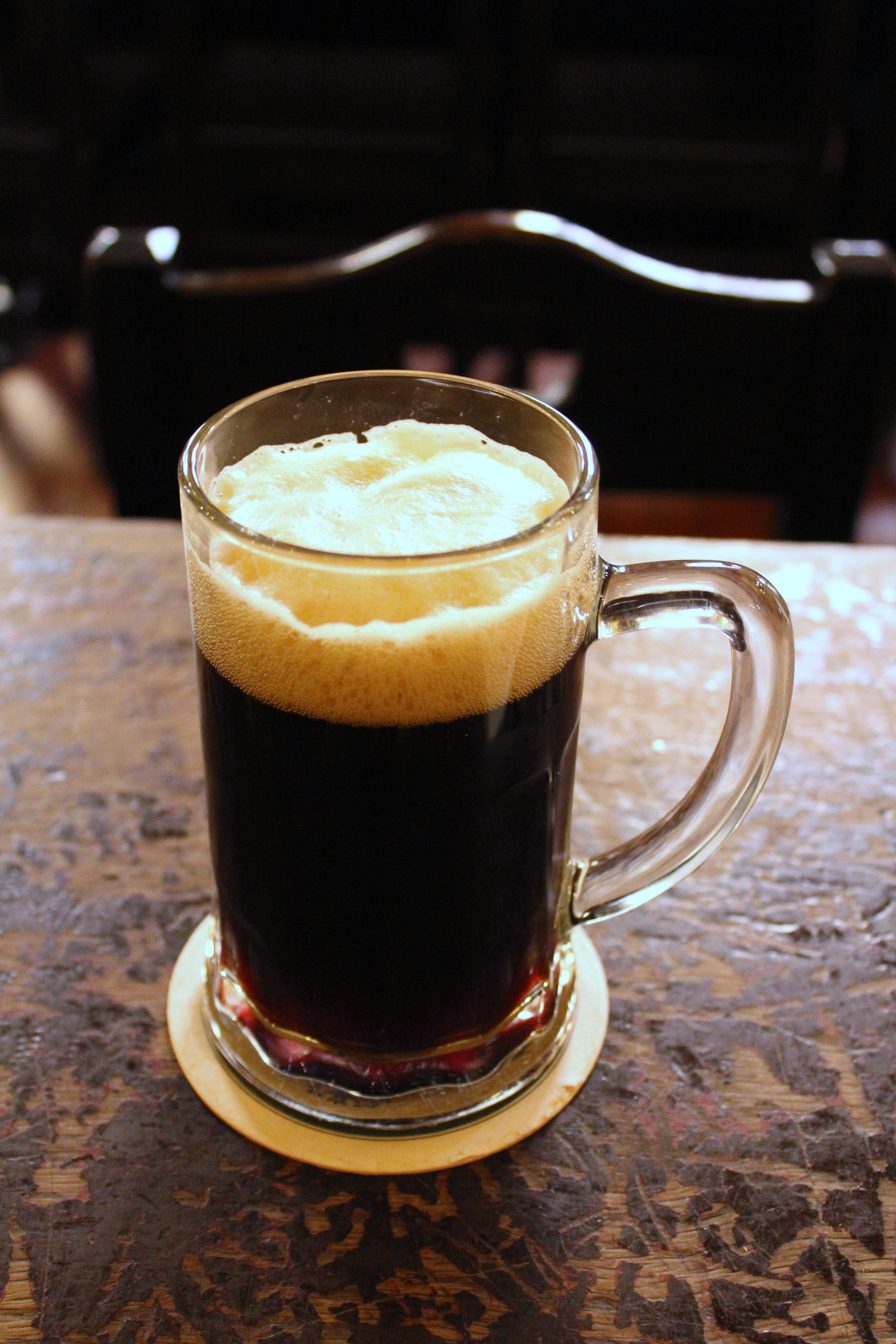
A glass of unfiltered dark beer from U Fleků brewery

Much of the brewing history of the Czech capital is tied to various monasteries. Brewing was first recorded at the Benedictine Břevnov Monastery in 993 AD. It is also recorded that in 1088 AD, King Vratislaus II granted a tithe of hops to the Canons of Vyšehrad Cathedral in order to brew beer.

Today, Prague's brewing scene is far more diverse than merely industrial production. Staropramen remains the main industrial brewery, with its Smíchov brewery being one of the largest and most modern in the country. The oldest brewpub is U Fleků, which was founded in 1499 and has been brewing beer ever since. There were a total of three breweries in Prague in 1989—in Smíchov, Holešovice, and Braník. Most other breweries and brewpubs in Prague were established post-1989 and especially, after 2000.

In 2025, "beer culture in the Czech Republic" was officially added to the national List of Intangible Cultural Heritage, recognizing brewing traditions, hop and barley cultivation, pub life, and the social role of beer. This was prepared by the Czech Beer and Malt Association, the Ministry of Culture, and experts in ethnology and history.

=== Žatec ===
The tradition of brewing beer in Žatec spans over 700 years. Žatec Brewery has been owned by Carlsberg Group since 2014. Previously, it was wholly owned by Kordoni Holding Limited, based out of Nicosia, in Cyprus. Saaz hops, a "noble" variety of hops that accounted for more than 2/3 of total 2009 hop production in the Czech Republic, owes its name to the German spelling of Žatec.

In 2023, the hop-growing landscape around Žatec, including hop farms, drying kilns, warehouses, and the historic centre, was inscribed on the UNESCO World Heritage List, recognising its cultural, agricultural, and industrial significance.

=== Brno and South Moravia ===
South Moravia is known for winemaking, but brewing also has a presence. In Brno, the large industrial brewery Starobrno remains a major player. Elsewhere in the region, Černá Hora stands out as one of the large breweries.

Since the early 2000s, smaller breweries and brewpubs, such as Richard, have increased in popularity, despite smaller production. Pegas Brno was established shortly after 1989 as one of the first post-Communist microbreweries in Moravia: it produces about 230,000 liters annually, with a selection of regular and limited-edition beers.

Another revival is Akciový Pivovar Dalešice, which has restored historic brewing traditions (unfiltered, non-pasteurized, using only malt, hops, yeast, and water). It also hosts cultural events and a museum, and it has become a local attraction.

== Categories of beer ==
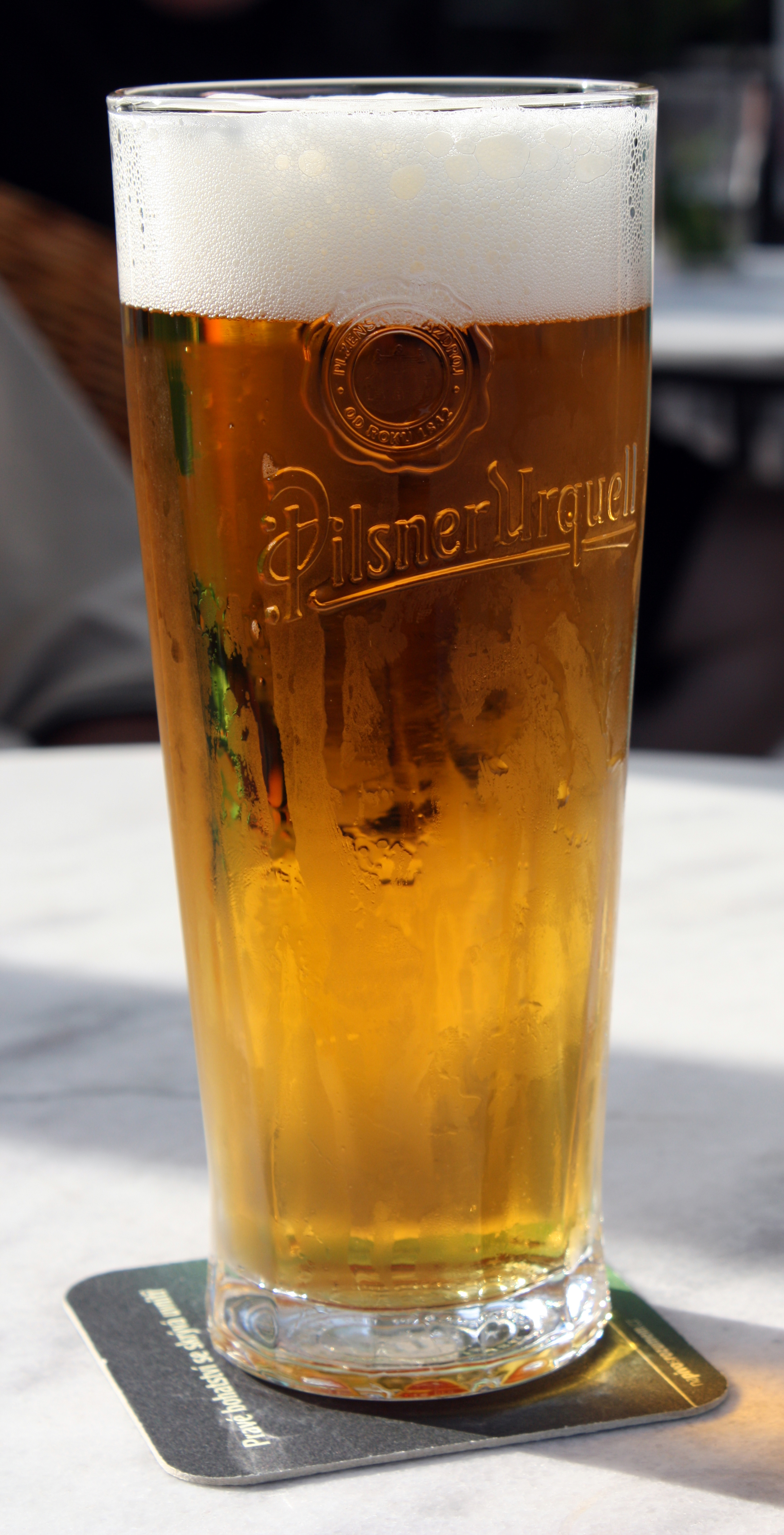
A glass of Czech pilsner lager

Most beer brewed in the Czech Republic is pilsner lager. Czech beers vary in colour from pale (světlé), through amber (polotmavé) and dark (tmavé), to black (černé), and in strength from 3–9% ABV. Top-fermented wheat beer (pšeničné pivo) is also available.

In the Czech Republic, it is still customary to label the strength of beer by the so-called degree scale (in Czech: stupňovitost). It is expressed as a weight percentage of sucrose and is used to indicate the percentage by weight of extract (sucrose) in a solution. So, 12° beer has 12% of these substances dissolved in water. A 10° beer is about 4% alcohol by volume, a 12° is about 5%, and a 16° is about 6.5%.

According to Czech law, categories of beer, regardless of colour or style, are:

- lehké – a "light" beer brewed below 8° Balling and with less than 130kJ per 100ml
- výčepní – a "draught" beer, though it can be bottled, brewed between 8° and 10°
- ležák – a "lager" beer, brewed between 11° and 12.99°
- speciál – a "special" beer, brewed above 13°

Originally, pilsner was a specific term for beers brewed in Plzeň (with Pilsner Urquell being registered as a trademark by the first brewery). The term has come to mean any pale, hoppy lager as a result of imitations of the original beer, especially in Germany, where the style is common.

== Festivals ==
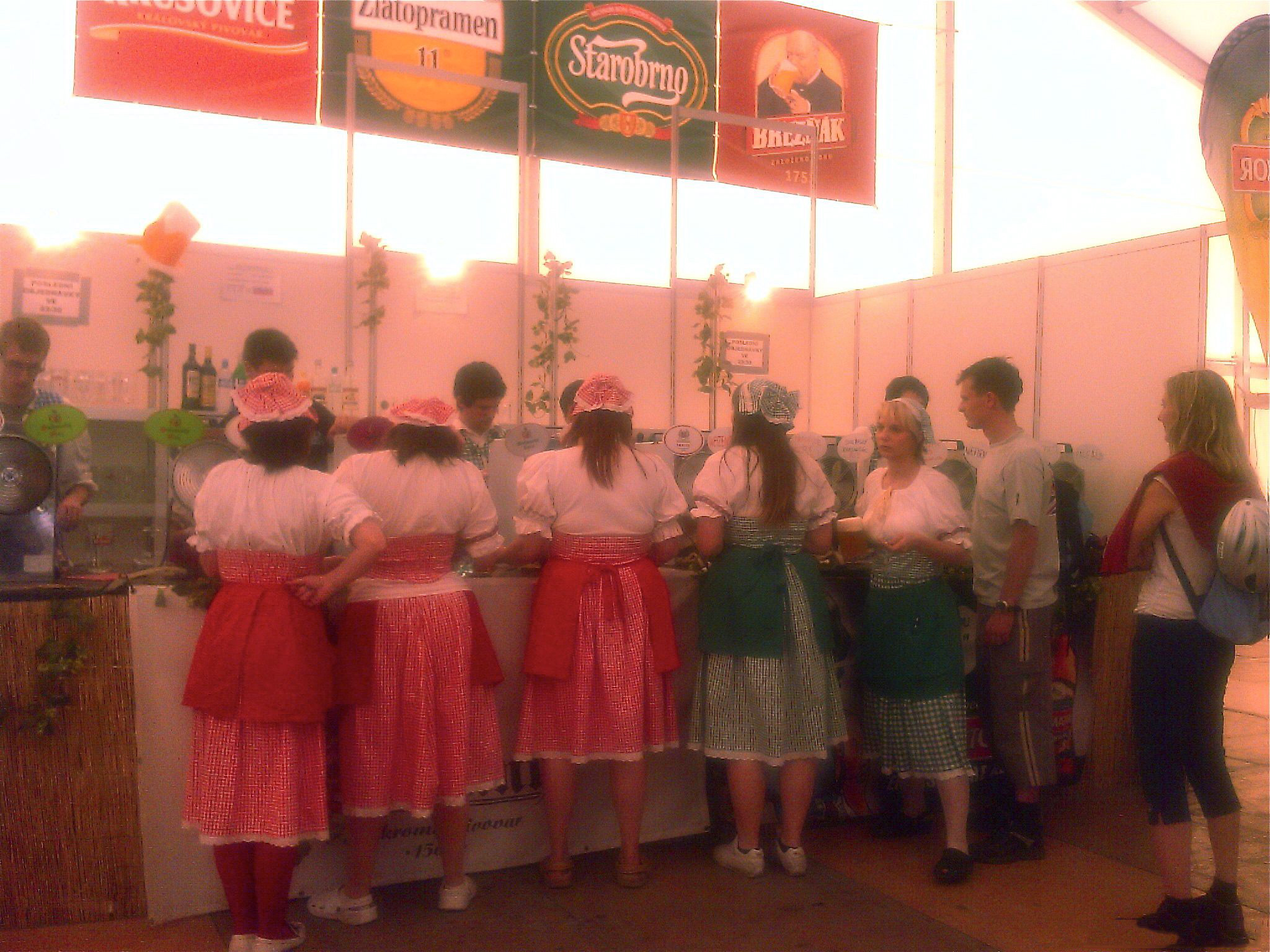
The Czech Beer Festival in Prague

There are many beer festivals in the Czech Republic. One of them is Pilsner Fest: held every year in Plzeň by the Pilsner Urquell Brewery, this two-day celebration marks the anniversary of the first brewing of Pilsner Urquell in 1842. The event includes concerts, tours, tastings, and historical reenactments.

The Czech Beer Festival (Český pivní festival), founded in Prague in 2008, quickly became the largest such event in the country, featuring up to 120 national breweries. It ran annually until 2018, when it was discontinued. The Prague Beer Fest, aimed more at craft breweries, then took the lead.

== Research institutions ==
- Malting Institute in Brno
- Research Institute of Brewing and Malting

== Export ==
=== Overview ===
The Czech Republic is both a leading beer producer and exporter. With over forty industrial breweries and over seventy small and medium-sized family breweries, beer remains one of the most important and well-known exports in the country. In 2016, Czech breweries exported approximately 3.68 million hectoliters of beer within the European Union. By 2023, the Czech Republic ranked fifth among the world's top beer exporters, with beer exports valued at 346 million dollars, representing 2.06 percent of global beer exports. Within the European Union, the Czech Republic ranked as the eighth-largest beer producer, with an annual production of about 1.8 billion litres.

Over half of Czech beer exports go to neighboring countries, especially Slovakia, Germany, Poland, and Russia. Additionally, Czech exports to China nearly doubled from 2014 to 2015, with 0.65 of 3.65 million hectoliters going to the Asian nation. In 2022, Slovakia imported $59 million (17.9%) worth of beer from the Czech Republic, and Germany imported $56 million (17.1%).

There has been a steady decrease in beer consumption within the Czech Republic, but breweries have noted an increase in their production due to rising international interest. Exports are especially important for Czech breweries, as consumption in the country has decreased by about five liters per person. The CEO of Staropramen, Petr Kovařík, speculates this decline has been partly attributed to lifestyle changes and regulations such as the nationwide smoking ban introduced in 2017. At the same time, international demand has helped maintain overall brewery production levels.

=== Economic impact ===
The beer sector in the Czech Republic provided about 76,000 domestic jobs in 2014. This number was a 4.6 percent decline from 2013, which may be explained by the increasing number of microbreweries and specialty beers, or more beer mixes and ciders being consumed. In 2013 and 2014, the total consumer spending on beer within the country was 2,563,000 million euros and 2,431,000 euros, respectively. Additionally, total brewing production increased 2013 to 2014, from 18.7 billion euros to 19.1 billion euros. This included all brewing companies, breweries, and microbreweries. In total, in 2016, Czech breweries produced a record amount of beer, at 20.48 million hectoliters. This was an increase from 2015 of 1.5 percent. Tourists consumed 750,000 hectoliters of beer in 2016, an increase from 2015 of 19 percent. In 2012, beer production accounted for 0.8 percent of the nominal gross domestic product, and the Czech government benefits from taxes paid on beer. Revenue from excise duties, VAT tax, and income tax in 2012 was about 28,506 million CZK.

=== Brewing companies ===
==== Plzeňský Prazdroj Group ====
Founded in 1842, the most popular brewing company in the Czech Republic has grown significantly since its creation. Currently, the Plzeňský Prazdroj group of breweries produces the following beers: Pilsner Urquell, Gambrinus, Velkopopovický Kozel, and Radegast. This group has three separate breweries, each of which produce their own specific beer.

In 2010, the Plzeňský Prazdroj group saw an increase in exports by five percent, especially in the German market, with 240,000 hectoliters, the Slovak market, with 114,500 hectolitres, and the British market, with 24,000 hectolitres. Additionally, in 2010, they began sales to the United Arab Emirates, Syria, South Korea, Vietnam, and Argentina.

The company credits their growing sales to Asian countries like Vietnam and Taiwan to the number of international visitors to the Czech Republic. Taiwanese people were the third-largest nationality to visit the brewery each year, after Czechs and Germans, as of 2012.

In 2016, Plzeňský Prazdroj sold 11 million hectolitres of beer, with an increase in 1 million hectoliters, and exports grew by ten percent.

Additionally, it is speculated that the increase in beer exports and consumption is contributed to by the fact that its parent company, SABMiller, was sold to the Japanese Asahi Breweries. The company sought out to acquire more brewing companies, as beer consumption had been declining in Japan.

In 2017, over one third of Plzeňský Prazdroj's sales stemmed from exports, an increase of 8 percent from the previous year. Exports increased by 1.5 million hectoliters. In April, right after the sale to Asahi Breweries, Plzeňský Prazdroj began exports to China. Karel Kraus, manager of the Pilsner Urquell brand, credits the company's success to their increase in beer on tap, which is exported to more than thirty countries and represents twenty percent of the Pilsner Urquell beer industry.

==== Staropramen Brewery ====
Available in more than thirty-five countries worldwide, Pivovary Staropramen is the second largest beer producer in the Czech Republic, with their main beers being the eponymous Staropramen, Braník, and Velvet. The company operates two breweries: Staropramen and Ostravar. In business since 1998, the company holds 15.6 percent of the domestic beer market. Staropramen is owned by Molson Coors.

In 2008, Staropramen exported 687,000 hectoliters of beer. By 2017, this had grown to 3.1 million hectoliters, an increase of six thousand hectoliters from the previous year.

==== Budějovický Budvar ====
Budějovický Budvar, not to be confused with the American company Budweiser, is one of the largest brewing companies in the Czech Republic; produces Budweiser, Budvar, Budweiser Budvar. Its main markets outside the Czech Republic are Germany and Slovakia.

== See also ==
- Beer and breweries by region
- Beer in Germany
- Types of beer
- Friends of Beer Party
