= Meetings on the Bridge =

- Country: Turkey
- Sponsors: Anadolu Efes
- Website: film.iksv.org/tr/koprude-bulusmalar

Meetings on the Bridge is a co-production, training, and networking platform organized by the Istanbul Foundation for Culture and Arts (İKSV) within the framework of the Istanbul Film Festival. Held annually, the event brings together film professionals from Turkey with internationally active industry executives. It provides opportunities for co-production, training, and networking, while supporting the development of new feature-length film projects and enabling works in the post-production stage to be presented to the industry. It is the first co-production market established im Turkey.

Within the scope of Meetings on the Bridge, filmmakers from Turkey have the opportunity to present their fiction and documentary projects to international producers, festival and fund representatives, distributors, and broadcasters. Through workshops, project presentations, and one-on-one meetings, the program encourages know-how exchange and fosters sustainable collaborations.

At the event, producers, directors, and screenwriters present their projects to international film industry professionals. Workshops are organized to support the development of the selected projects. Within the framework of Meetings on the Bridge, sections such as the Film Development Platform, Work in Progress Platform, Short Film Workshop, and the German–Turkish Co-Production Development Fund are included. The main sponsor of the event, which was first launched in 2006, is . First launched in 2006, the event has also received private financial support from institutions and private companies such as Anadolu Efes and the Istanbul Development Agency.

== History ==
Meetings on the Bridge was launched in 2006 as a series of cinema talks within the framework of the 25th Istanbul Film Festival. Over time, its scope expanded with the development of the film industry in Turkey and the support of international film institutions. In 2008, the Film Development Workshop, aimed at projects in the development stage, was organized for the first time.

In 2011, Meetings on the Bridge launched the German–Turkish Co-Production Development Fund in collaboration with Medienboard Berlin-Brandenburg and the MOIN Film Fund Hamburg Schleswig-Holstein. In 2012, the Work in Progress Workshop was added to the program.

In 2015, the structure of the workshops was expanded and transformed into a more comprehensive training program covering script development, production, marketing, and pitching techniques. In 2016 and 2017, Meetings on the Bridge became the first film event from Turkey to receive support from Creative Europe. In 2017, the Short Film Workshop was introduced.

It aims to support the development of feature-length fiction and documentary projects from Turkey and to connect them with international film industry professionals.

== Film Development Platform ==
It aims to support the development of feature-length fiction and documentary projects from Turkey and connect them with international film professionals.

== Work in Progress Platform ==
It aims to support the completion and international promotion of feature-length fiction and documentary films that are in post-production or have completed at least 70% of principal photography.

== Short Film Workshop ==
It enables short film projects in the development stage to meet international industry professionals and supports emerging filmmakers in building connections within the sector while preparing for professional production processes.

== Other Programs ==
=== Cinema Talks ===
It consists of talks and workshop programs organized each year around different themes. Focusing on the creative, production, and intellectual processes of cinema, these events bring together film professionals, students, and audiences interested in cinema.

=== German–Turkish Co-Production Development Fund ===
The fund supports feature-length film projects in the development stage that are co-productions between Turkey and Germany, thereby strengthening intercultural collaboration between filmmakers in the two countries. It is awarded in collaboration with Meetings on the Bridge, Medienboard Berlin-Brandenburg, and the MOIN Film Fund Hamburg Schleswig-Holstein.
