= Velké Březno =

- Municipality
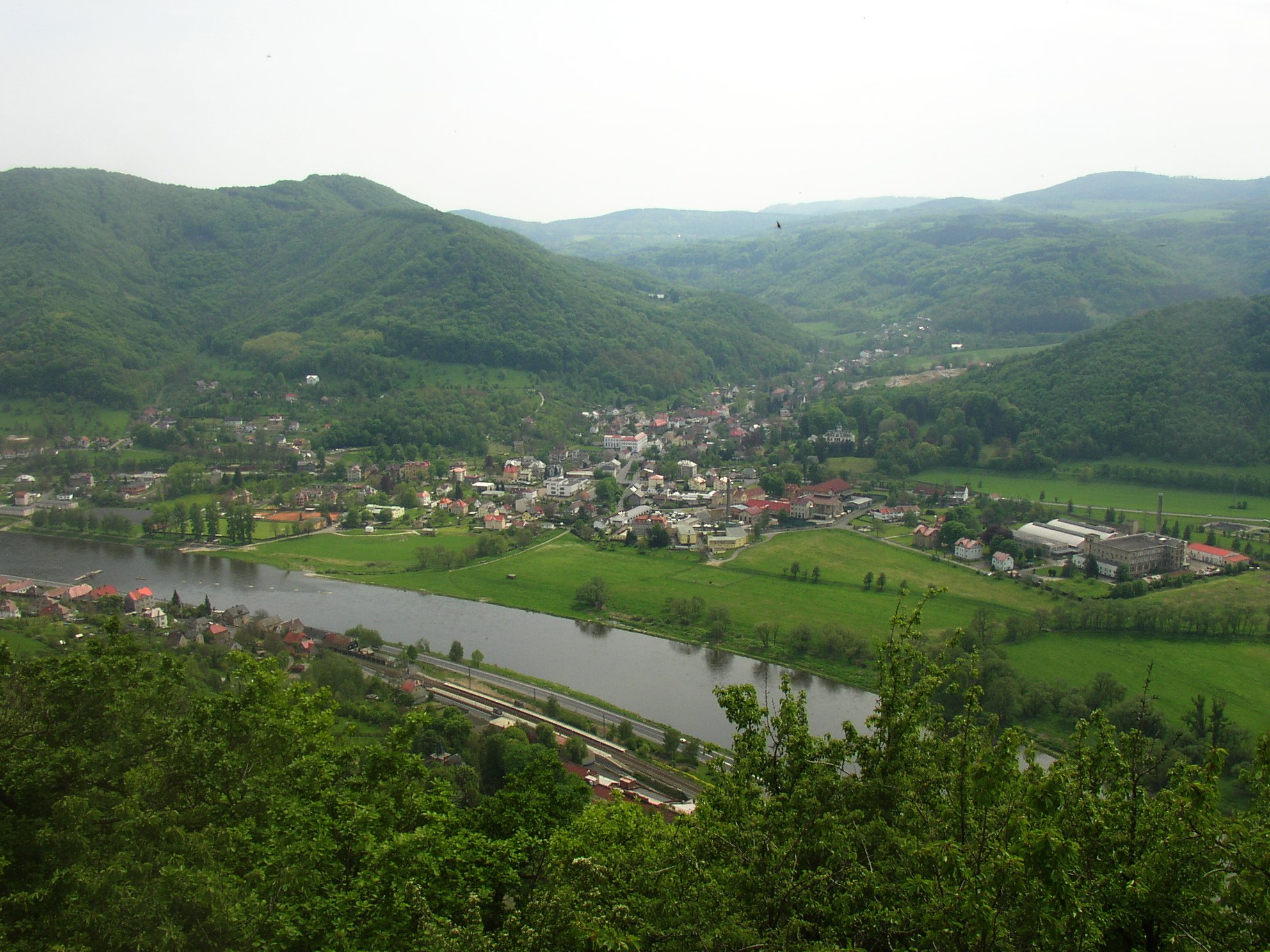
- View from the north

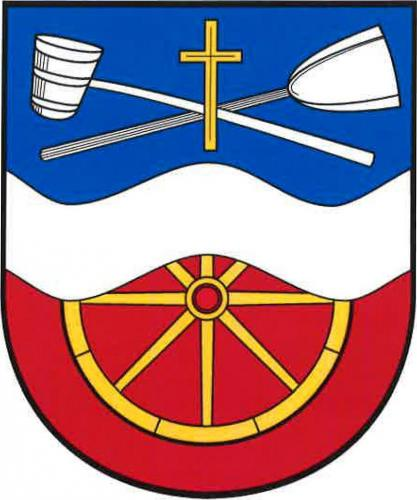
- Flag Coat of arms

- Location in the Czech Republic
- Coordinates: 50°39′46″N 14°8′31″E
- Country: Czech Republic
- Region: Ústí nad Labem
- District: Ústí nad Labem
- First mentioned: 1167

Area
  - Total: 8.11 km^{2} (3.13 sq mi)
- Elevation: 139 m (456 ft)

Population (2026-01-01)
  - Total: 2,422
  - Density: 299/km^{2} (773/sq mi)
- Time zone: UTC+1 (CET)
  - Summer (DST): UTC+2 (CEST)
- Postal code: 403 23
- Website: www.velke-brezno.cz

Velké Březno (German: Großpriesen) is a municipality and village in Ústí nad Labem District in the Ústí nad Labem Region of the Czech Republic. It has about 2,400 inhabitants.

== Administrative division ==
Velké Březno consists of two municipal parts (in brackets population according to the 2021 census):

- Velké Březno (1,658)
- Valtířov (658)

== Etymology ==
The name Březno is derived from březový les (i.e. 'birch forest'). From the 15th century, the attribute Velké ('great') is used.

== Geography ==
Velké Březno is located about 7 kilometres (4 mi) east of Ústí nad Labem. It lies in Central Bohemian Uplands and in the České středohoří Protected Landscape Area. The highest point is the hill Kočičí vrch at 525 m (1,722 ft) above sea level. The municipality is situated on the right bank of the Elbe River.

== History ==
The first written mention of Velké Březno is from 1167, when the area became property of the Knights Hospitaller. At the turn of the 13th and 14th centuries, Velké Březno was acquired by the Wartenberg family. For financial reasons they were forced to sell the village in 1520 to the Salhausen family, then the owners often changed. In 1712–1841, the estate was a property of the Counts of Harrach. The last noble owners of Velké Březno were the Chotek family. They had rebuilt the old castle and then had built a new one.

== Demographics ==
Historical population

Year	Pop.	±%
1869	767	—
1880	929	+21.1%
1890	1,367	+47.1%
1900	2,182	+59.6%
1910	2,645	+21.2%

Year	Pop.	±%
1921	2,392	−9.6%
1930	2,832	+18.4%
1950	2,033	−28.2%
1961	2,127	+4.6%
1970	2,073	−2.5%

Year	Pop.	±%
1980	2,047	−1.3%
1991	1,782	−12.9%
2001	1,865	+4.7%
2011	2,169	+16.3%
2021	2,316	+6.8%

Source: Censuses

== Economy ==
Velké Březno is known for its brewery, which produces beer under the brand Březňák. Today the brewery is owned by Heineken N.V..

== Transport ==
Velké Březno is located on the railway line Ústí nad Labem–Děčín.

== Sights ==
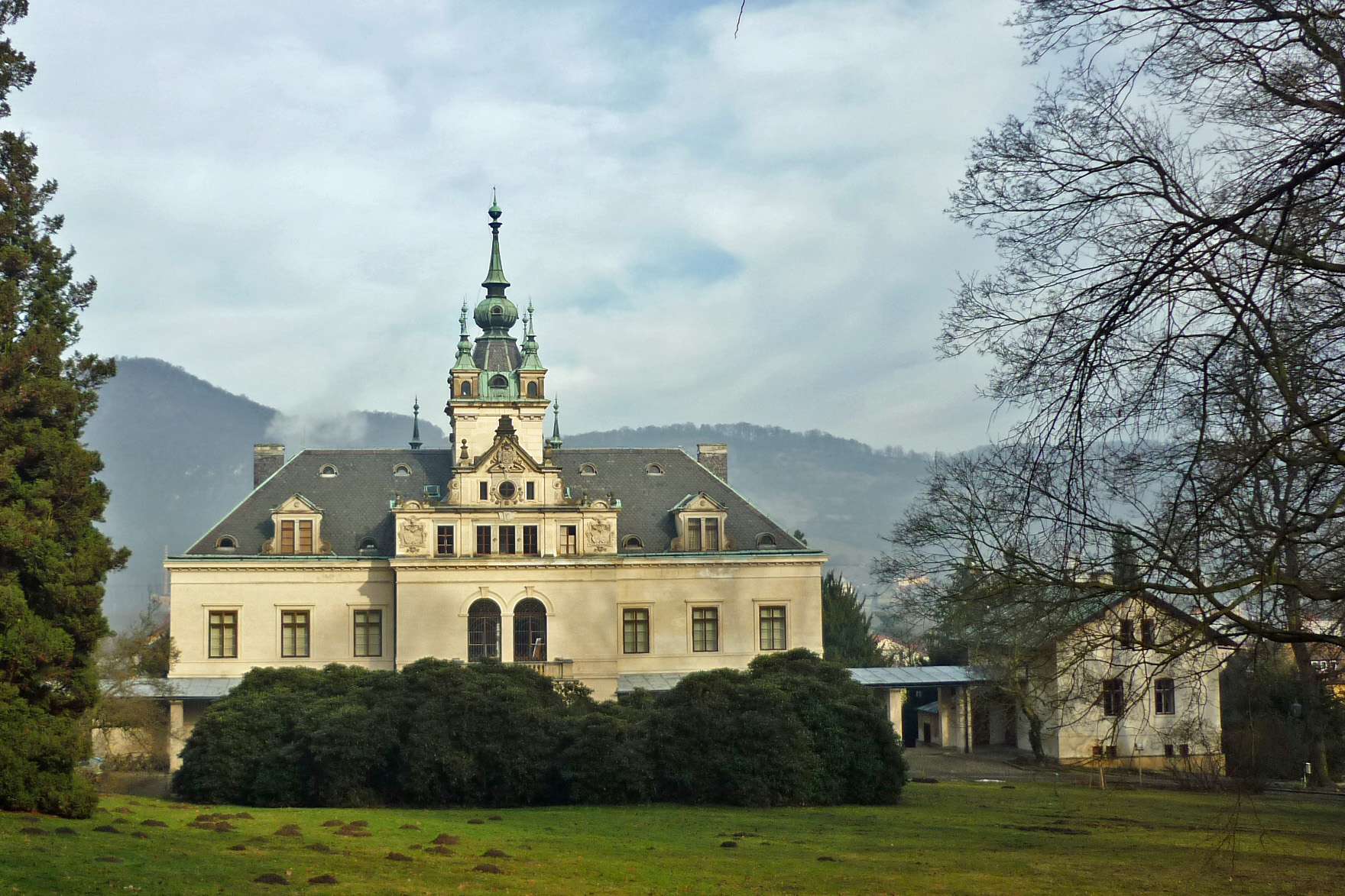
Velké Březno Castle

The main landmark of Velké Březno is the Velké Březno Castle. It was built in the Neoclassical style in 1842–1845 according to the design by Ludwig Förster. In 1885, it was rebuilt in the Neo-Renaissance style. The castle is surrounded by a park. Today the castle is owned by the state. It is open to the public and offers guided tours.

The castle Starý zámek (lit. 'old castle'; also called Dolní zámek, lit. 'lower castle') was probably originally a fortress from second half of the 15th century, rebuilt after 1528 into a small aristocratic Renaissance residence. After 1841, the castle was rebuilt and was raised by a floor. Today it houses a retirement home.

The Church of Saint Wenceslaus is located in Valtířov. It was built in the Gothic-Renaissance style in 1573–1574 on the site of an older church from the 14th century. It is valuable because of its authentically preserved form. Next to the church is the brick neo-Gothic tomb of the Chotek family from 1869.
