= Malting Institute in Brno =

Barley and malt evaluation institute in Brno, Czech Republic

- Director: Prof. Ing. Tomáš Brányik, PhD.
- Address: Mostecká 971/7, 614 00; Brno, Czech Republic
- Coordinates: 49°12′25.8″N 16°37′40.6″E
- Interactive map of Malting Institute in Brno
- Website: beerresearch.cz/

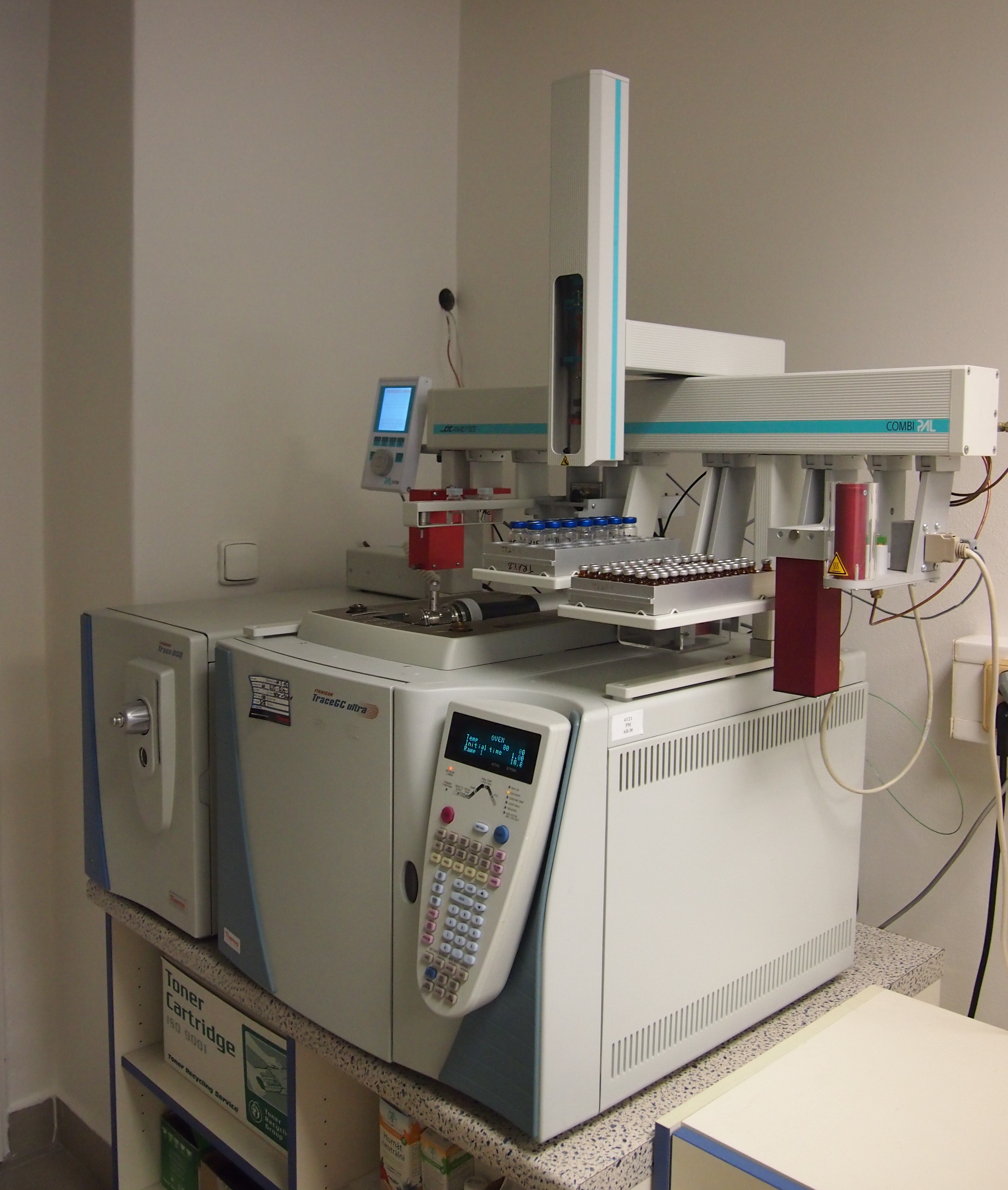
Gas chromatograph with the mass detector is mostly used for the determination of contaminants (pesticides, acryl amide, 3-MCPD etc.) and volatile substances.

Malting Institute in Brno (Czech: Sladařský ústav v Brně) is a workplace specialized in the evaluation of barley and malt quality of beer in the Czech Republic. It is headquartered in Brno.

== History ==
Before the First World War, the most commercial and brewing malthouses in the Austro-Hungarian Empire were concentrated in Moravia and Bohemia. The Moravian malthouses used services of the Vienna laboratory Institut für Gärungsindustrie of prof. E. Jalowetz (1862 - 1936). After the First World War, the Czechoslovak Malting Commission in Brno was founded; the Commission initiated the establishment of the Institute of the Malting Industry. The task of setting up the institute was assumed by Vladimír Vavřin Žila (1889-1953), the graduate from the Wiener Akademie für Brau-Industrie. V. V. Žila managed the Institute of the Malting Industry from its establishment, at first as a head of the laboratory and lately, to his death, as a director.

The ”State Research Institute of Fermentation Industry” connected with the “Research Institute of Malting Industry“ was established at Czech University of Technology (today Brno University of Technology) by the decree of the Ministry of School and Education on August 4, 1920.

On August 4, 1920 the Institute of Malting Industry started conducting analytical checks of the first samples in a makeshift laboratory (7 Falkensteinerova, today 7 Gorkého). At the same time the laboratory was awarded the state authorization. In mid 1921 the Institute moved to its own premises in the chemical pavilion of Czech University of Technology (17 Za úvozem, today 17 Žižkova).

== Activities ==
During 1925 – 1932, the Institute organized “Malting and Brewing Conventions“. It had its own display within the Exhibition of Contemporary Culture in Czechoslovakia (1928) and also helped organize the Exhibition of Malting and Brewing, which was part of a large Exhibition of Modern Commerce (1929). In 1933, the pilot experimental malthouse was set up. In the period of 1932-1936 the Institute organized the “Moravian Malting School in Brno“ and in 1935 – 1939 the journal “Reports of the Institute for the Fermentation Industry“ was published.

The Institute continued in its activities throughout the whole war period. In the effort to strengthen Czech malting and brewing community from professional and national aspects, Žila’s edition of brewing papers was founded. Four monographs were published in this edition during the occupation.

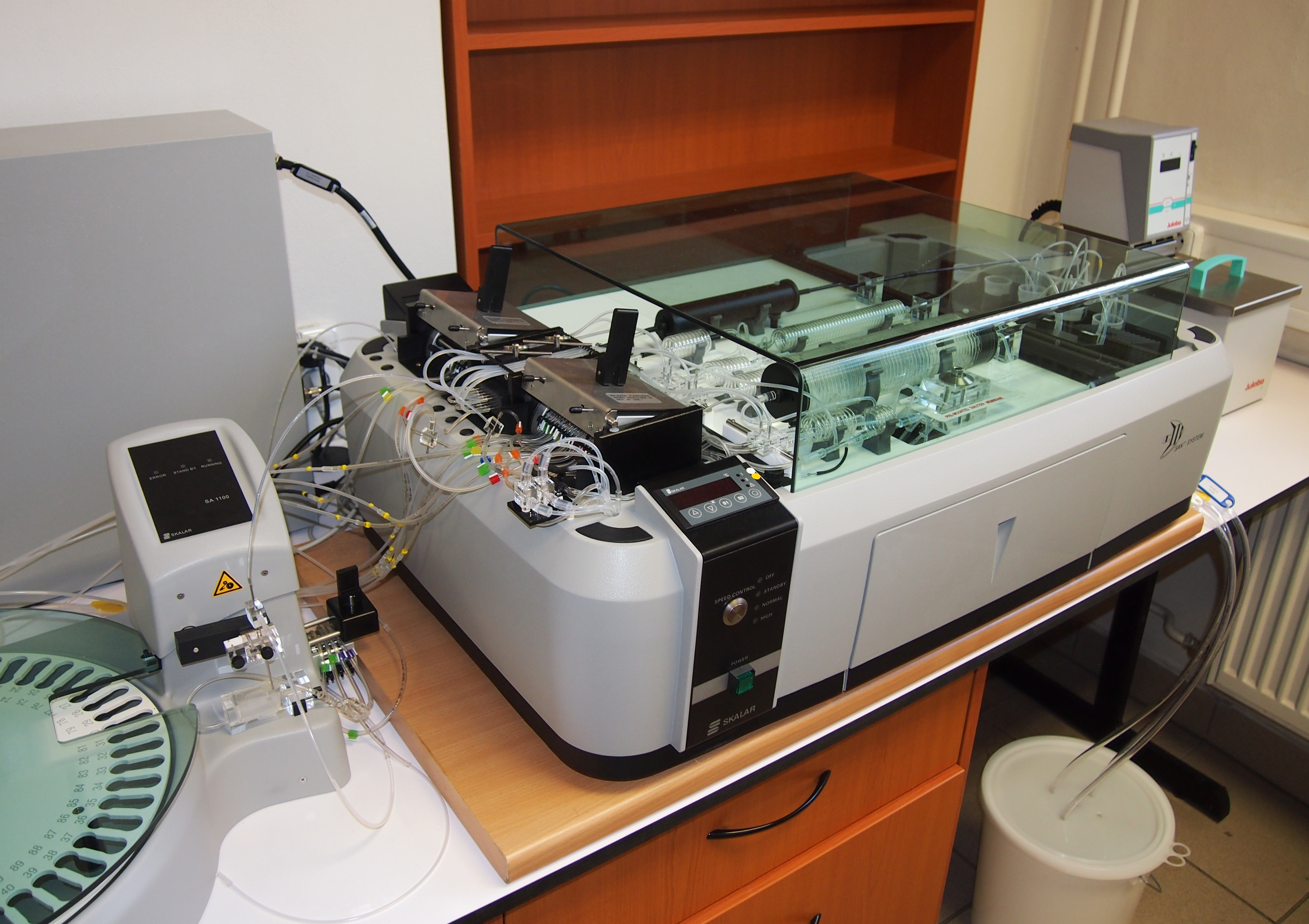
Continuous flow analyzer used for segmented flow analysis of beta-glucans, diastatic power, and free alpha-amino nitrogens

== After Liberation ==
After 1946, the Institute started to develop its activities again. With the support of První brněnská strojírna (First Brno Engineering Plant) an experimental brewery for 8 hl was built. At the same time an experimental microbrewery for 30 liters was set up.

By the decree of the Ministry of Education, Arts and Sciences, the Institute was included in the sector of the Ministry of Food Industry with the effect from January 1, 1951. The staff of the Institute thus lost the opportunity to participate in the education of university students.

In 1951, the building of Dr. Edvard Beneš Technical University where the Institute had its seat, was handed over to the Military Technical Academy. The Malting Institute had to move out in 1952 to buildings after the nationalized company DIMO (7 Mostecká, Brno) where it has its seat till today. Neither the experimental brewery nor the pilot experimental malthouse could be moved to new premises.

As of January 1, 1952 the “Research Institute of Brewing and Malting” (RIBM) was set up by the Ministry of Food Industry. The Institute incorporated workplaces of the Research Institute of Brewing and Malting in Prague, Microbiological Stations at the experimental brewery in Braník and the workplace of the Research Institute of Fermentation Industry in Brno. Thus, since 1952, history of the above listed workplaces is common.

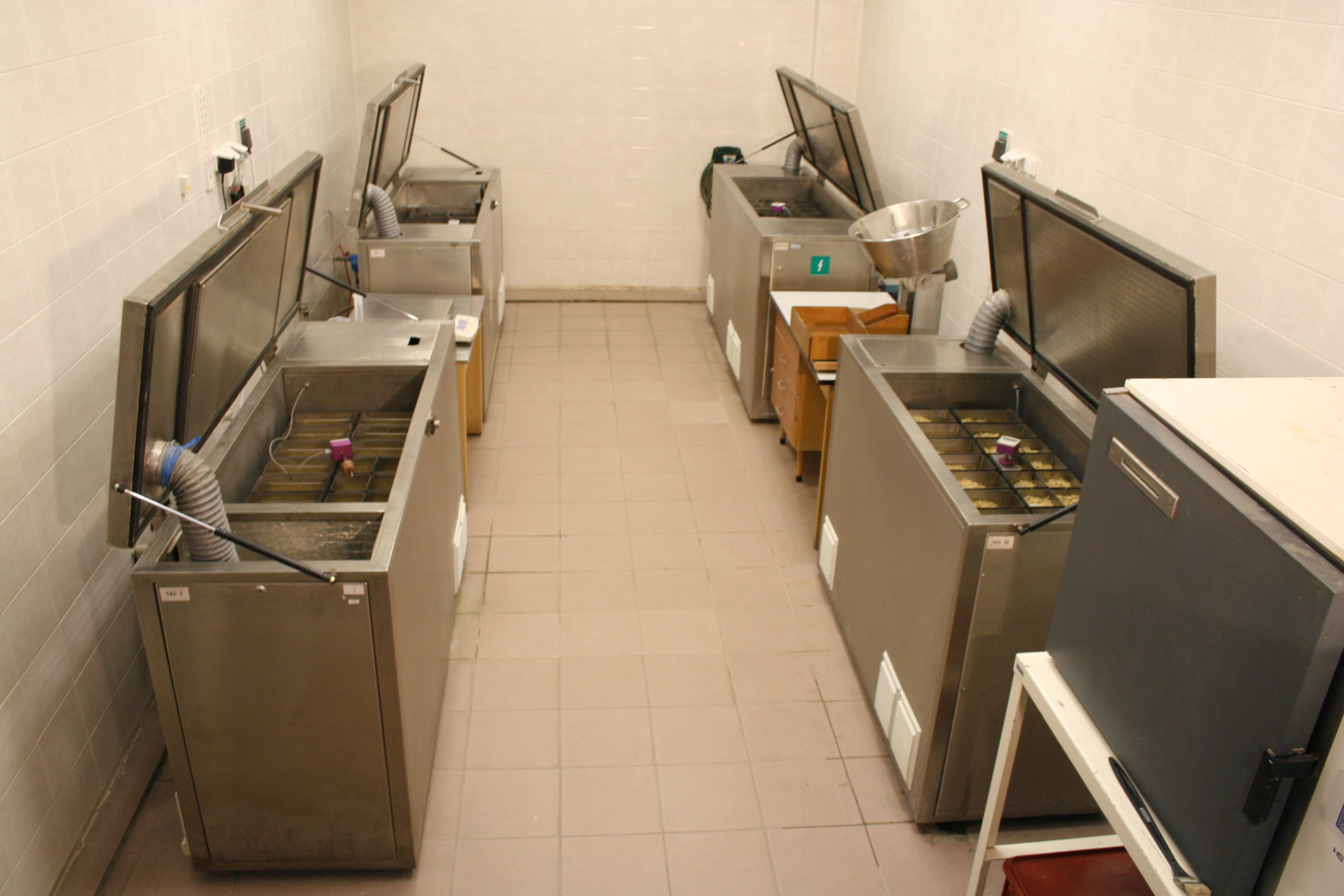
Micromalting plant for production of small malt samples for their subsequent analyses.

== Present Days ==
The Malting Institute became the RIBM’s Brno workplace specialized in the evaluation of barley and malt quality. In 2000 the original name of the workplace again appears in its name “Analytical Testing Laboratory – Malting Institute Brno“ (registration number 1309.2).

Since 1998, “Barley Year Book” has been published in the RIBM’s Brno workplace each year. It brings information on barley varieties, statistical data on barley and malt, malthouses directory etc. In 2005-2006, the Brno workplace was completely reconstructed and modernized. In 2015, the “Library of Barley and Malt“ was set up.

The Czech malting and brewing industry supports research projects “The evaluation of malting barley varieties“ and “The evaluation of malting barley quality“, which have been mostly executed in the RIBM’s Brno workplace. Based on the results of three-year tests, the RIBM’s Brno workplace recommends the varieties of spring barley for production of beer with the protected geographical indication “České pivo“ (Czech Beer).

== Literature ==
- Anonymous, 1928: Ústav kvasného průmyslu při České vysoké škole technické v Brně. Nákladem vlastním, Brno.
- Frantík, F., Černohorská, M., 2007: 120 let historie VÚPS v datech. KvasnyPrum. 53(10): 316-317. Dostupné online
- Kosař, K., 1995: 75. výročí založení Sladařského ústavu. Kvasný průmysl 41(7): 204–205.
- Psota, V., 2016: 95 years of the Malting Institute in Brno. KvasnyPrum. 62(2): 71-80 | DOI: 10.18832/kp2016012
- Trkan, M., 1972: Výzkumný ústav pivovarský a sladařský – pracoviště Brno.KvasnyPrum. 18(1): 4-6. Dostupné online
