= Research Institute of Brewing and Malting =

Czech joint-stock company

- Director: Prof. Ing. Tomáš Brányik, PhD.
- Address: Lípová 511/15, 120 00; Prague 2, Czech Republic
- Coordinates: 50°4′31.3″N 14°25′25.8″E
- Interactive map of Research Institute of Brewing and Malting
- Website: beerresearch.cz/

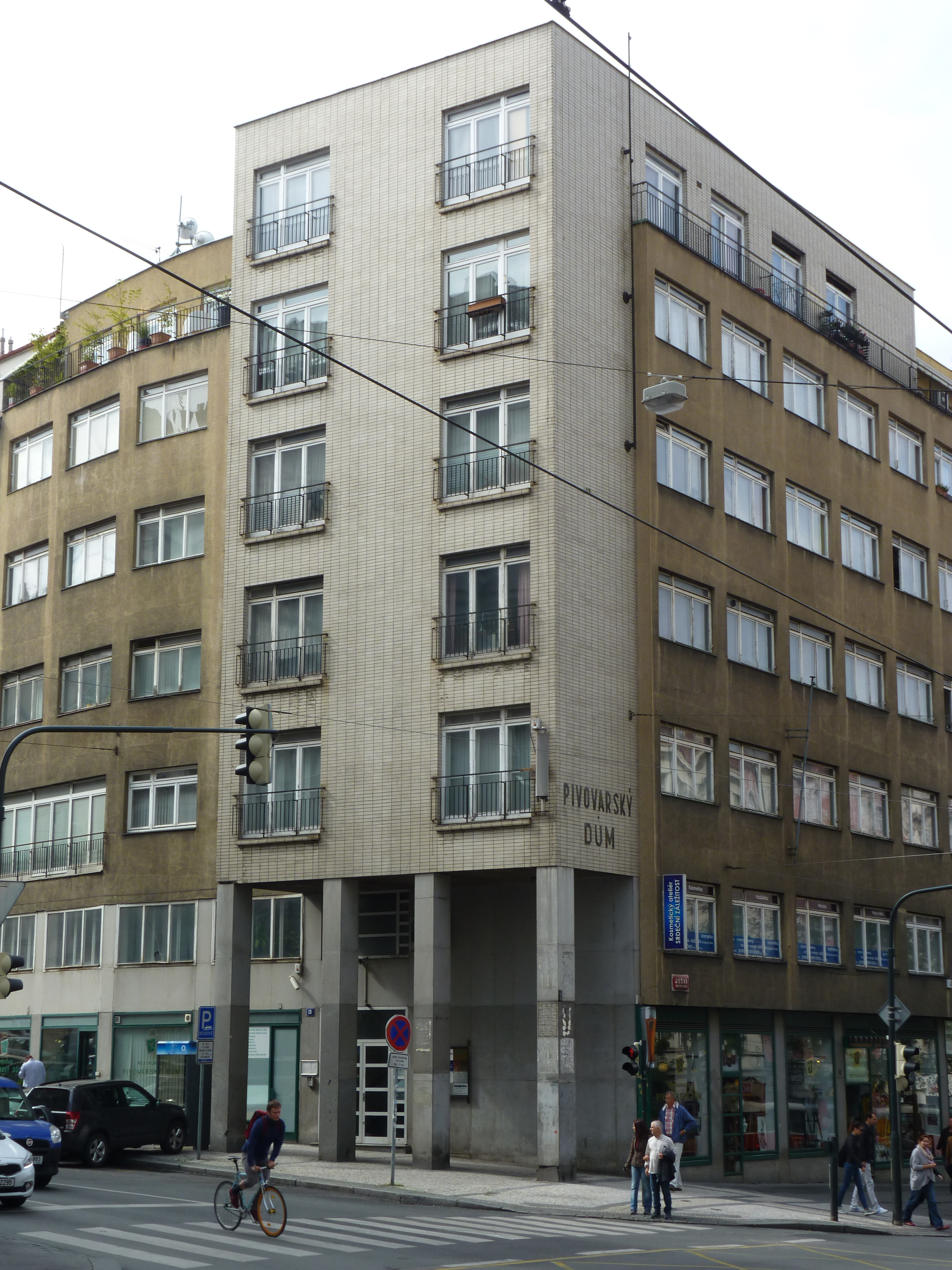
A building of the Research Institute of Brewing and Malting

The Research Institute of Brewing and Malting (RIBM) (Czech: Výzkumný ústav pivovarský a sladařský, a.s.) in Czech - was founded in 1887 and since 1994 It has been a joint-stock company. It is one of the oldest scientific research institutes in the Central European region.

== History ==
On 19 December 1886, the Union for the Establishment and Maintenance of the Research Institute for Brewing Industry in Prague was founded by the General Meeting held in the rooms of the Malting School in Prague. At the beginning of December, the Institute already seated at 871/26 Senovážné Square, Prague. The Institute officially started its activity at the beginning of 1888. In July 1888, the Institute organized the first course for microscopy.

In 1891, the Institute took part in the Jubilee Exhibition in Prague. The reference laboratory for brewers, iodine method (for malt saving), certificates, pure yeast and wall-boards were exhibited. In 1893, the Institute moved to new offices in 1762/5 Pštrossova Street in Prague, New Town.

In 1896, the director of the Copenhagen Institute, Alfred Jørgensen, donated a collection of microorganisms to the research institute. In April 1897, the Institute moved to new offices in White Swan Brewery in Prague Na Poříčí 1068/21 where it remained for next 40 years. In the school year 1910/1911, a higher brewing school was opened at the Research Institute. In 1912, the Ministry of Public Works granted the Research Institute the right to issue malting and brewing certificates.

In summer 1914, the Institute was restructured, the activities of both schools, the Union and the Research Institute were terminated. A new organization called the Society for the Maintenance of Scientific Institutes for the Brewing Industry in Prague was founded by the General Meeting held on September 13, 1914. As of October 1, 1914, the Research Institute, schools and the laboratory were renamed to the Scientific Brewing Institutes in Prague with the seat at 1068/21 Na Poříčí. The Ministry of Public Works confirmed the transfer of authorization to the newly renamed Institute.

In August 1920, from the initiative of Professor František Ducháček (1875 – 1931) and Vladimír Vavřín Žila (1889 – 1953), the State Research Institute of the Fermentation Industry at the Czech Technical University was founded in Brno. Its Malting Department (Malting Institute) began to operate on August 4, 1920.

At the meeting of the Directorate of the Scientific Brewing Institutes held on May 17, 1936, a proposal was made to buy together with the Union on the Protection of Breweries in Bohemia (a building in Prague 2, on the corner of Ječná and Lipová Streets No. 611/15 (U Pokorných). The old building was demolished and construction of the Brewery Hall for the needs of both organizations and for rent began in the same year. The project was designed by architect Gustav Paul. The Brewery Hall is a functional six-storey corner building with a short arcade. The reinforced concrete construction was performed by K. Skorkovsky, construction and craft works were carried out by V. Nekvasil. The entrance to the building was situated from Lipová Street, the gateway from Ječná Street. In April 1937, the building was completed and handed over to use. The Scientific Institutes moved into the building during June and July of the same year. The building has been the seat of the RIBM till today.

In 1951, within the post-war reorganization of the educational system, the educational activities of the Institute were terminated. As of January 1, 1962, the Prague Institute of the Brewing and Malting Industry, the microbiological station at the experimental brewery in Braník and the Research Institute of the Fermentation Industry in Brno were merged under the Research Institute of Brewing and Malting.

In 1962, the Institute was extended by the Experimental and Development Centre. In 1965, the Institute became part of the newly created Trust of Breweries and Malt Houses Prague (later the Concern). After 1989, the whole Concern was transformed into the state company Breweries and Malt Houses, Research and Services.

In the first half of the 1990s, the whole service company was privatized to a joint-stock company, which in 1994 was again renamed to the Research Institute of Brewing and Malting (RIBM). At that time the Institute had two directors: Managing Director of the joint-stock company, Mr. Jan Veselý, and the Director of the RIBM, Tomáš Lejsek, who was responsible for research.

The RIBM is a member of the Czech Beer and Malt Association.

In spring 1996, Karel Kosař was appointed as the head of the company, he subsequently cancelled the office of the Managing Director. In 2019 Karel Kosař retired.

New director became prof. Ing. Tomáš Brányik, Ph.D., known expert and educator who worked at the Institute of Biotechnology at the University of Chemistry and Technology in Prague. He is a graduate of Fermentation Chemistry and Bioengineering and was appointed as professor of biotechnology in 2016.

== People connected with the RIBM ==
=== Directors ===
- Antonín Kukla 1888–1896
- František Chodounský 1896–1905
- Vladimír Čihák 1905–1931
- Alois Stádník 1931–1932 (temporarily authorized)
- Jan Šatava 1932–1938
- Václav Kurz 1938 (authorized)
- R. Brunner (German manager during the occupation)
- Václav Salač 1945–1958
- Jiří Maštovský 1958–1962
- Jiří Tarant 1962–1970
- Olga Bendová 1970–1978
- Gabriela Basařová 1978–1982
- Jiří Cuřín 1982–1991
- Tomáš Lejsek 1991–1995
- Vladimír Kellner 1995–1996 (authorized)
- Karel Kosař 1996-2019
- Tomáš Brányik 2019-till now

=== Scientists and researchers ===
- Gabriela Basařová
- Olga Bendová
- Jiří Cuřín
- Miroslav Kahler
- Tomáš Lejsek
- Josef Škach
- Jan Voborský

== Activity ==
The RIBM is a joint-stock company with the research and development in the field of natural and technical sciences as the main subject of business.

It consists of two workplaces. The Brno workplace (7 Mostecká) houses the Analytical Testing Laboratory of the Malting Institute Brno; the Analytical Testing Laboratory of the Brewing Institute Prague is part of the Prague workplace (15 Lípová). Both analytical testing laboratories are accredited by the Czech Accreditation Institute, o.p.s. according to the ČSN EN ISO/IEC 17025: 2005.

Research priorities

Characteristics, development and selection of barley and hop varieties on the basis of latest knowledge about the characters of these raw materials for the production of Czech Beer

Due to the necessity of a successive exchange of malting barley varieties and the acquisition of specific clones of hops, it is necessary to monitor them from the early breeding stages to their application in practice and their evaluation by the standard and new analytical methods. The aim is to extend the existing knowledge about the analytical and biochemical characters of barley and hop varieties and bring further information that would deepen the evaluation of the varieties for the production and specific quality of beer with the protected geographical indication “České pivo” (Czech Beer). RIBM is the only organization that recommends the raw materials for České pivo. Within this research area the Institute closely cooperates with the Central Institute for Supervising and Testing in Agriculture in Brno.

Assessment of the suitability of the original yeast strains used for variants of the Czech Beer production technology in Czech breweries

The aim is to characterize the strains in the RIBM Collection (more than 100; 5 used in practice), the gradual reproduction of the selected archived original strains and the assessment of their suitability for the current and developed variants of the Czech Beer production technology. Specification of the influence of genetic and technological properties of these strains on the sensory and analytical characteristics of Czech Beer.

Expanding knowledge about the specific Czech Beer characteristics

The basic characterization of the analytical and sensory differences between Czech and foreign beers was performed by the RIBM in the period of 1999 and 2008. Thanks to this, it was possible to document the basic specific characters of Czech Beer (thermal products, oils, sensory active polyphenols and other substances). The presence and content of these substances can also serve as a marker that clearly distinguishes Czech Beer from foreign beers.

Research into characters of Czech Beer with positive and risky effects on health

Current knowledge confirms favourable characters of Czech Beer. Modern methods allow to determine more precisely the content and effects of substances with positive health characters, such as the antioxidant properties of polyphenol compounds and also some products of the thermic action of technological processes or in Czech Beers due to higher hopping, higher levels of specific compounds originating from hops and certain hop products. However, in addition to gradual monitoring of the occurrence of beneficial substances, it is also necessary to monitor the occurrence of risk compounds or problematic substances such as heavy metals, spraying residues, etc., to determine their concentration during technological variants of malt and beer production and to ensure the performance of clinical tests.

Development of technologies and recipes for the processing of malted traditional and non-traditional cereals, new use of hops, yeast and other production microorganisms for functional foods and beverages with health benefits

The research in this field leads towards expanding the portfolio of products of the malting and brewing industry, production of beverages, foods and food supplements based on raw materials and extracts enriched with substances from malt and hops with health benefits and fermentation of beverages by microorganisms producing substances with health benefits.

Development of procedures for the processing and utilization of wastes from malting, brewing and other food industry productions

New possibilities of biotechnological reprocessing of by-products (waste) of malting and brewing production to components of food, feed, pharmacologically active substances and energy sources are explored. The aim is to reduce existing inefficient use and to develop waste recovery practices within the sustainable development of the sector.

Development of new products and innovation of production processes of small and medium-sized breweries and malt houses

The aim of the research is to improve production practices, technology processes, quality assurance systems and health product safety, and develop new beer brands for specific industrial users. Collaboration with other institutions in the sphere of research. The Institute has a long-termed cooperation with the academic sphere.

University of Chemistry and Technology, Prague (Department of Biotechnology, Department of Food Analysis and Nutrition),

Mendel University in Brno (Faculty of Agronomy),

Masaryk University Brno (Faculty of Science),

Brno University of Technology,

the Faculty of Mathematics and Physics, Department of Chemical Physics and Optics in Charles University,

the Institute of Microbiology of the Academy of Sciences of the Czech Republic and

the Institute of Analytical Chemistry of the Academy of Sciences of the Czech Republic.

The private research organizations include the Hop Research Institute Co., Ltd., in Žatec and Agricultural Research Institute Kromeriz, Ltd. Besides the partner brewing and malting research institutes in Western Europe, the Institute collaborates with the

Faculty of Chemical and Food Technology of the Slovak Technical University in Bratislava, the Institute of Cryobiology and Food Technology of the Agricultural Academy of Bulgaria, and with the research centre of the Japanese brewing group Suntory. Within the malting barley breeding program, the RIBM also cooperates with the French breeding company Limagrain.

=== Other activities ===
Publishing

The Institute publishes the professional journal Kvasný průmysl a journal Kvasný. In addition, it has published more than 70 non-periodical publications (books), including three series of year-books: Pivovarský kalendář (“Brewery Calendar”, since 1998, a renewed edition of these year-books after more than 50 years), Ječmenářská ročenka (“Barley Year Book”, since 1998) and Chmelařská ročenka (“Hop Year Book”, since 1999). Other books include Technologie výroby sladu a piva („Technology of malt and beer production”, S. Procházka, K. Kosař, 2000, 2012), Kvalita rostlinných produktů na prahu 3. tisíciletí (“Quality of plant products on the threshold of the 3rd millennium!, J. Prugar, 2008), Senzorická analýza piva (“Sensory analysis of beer”, Olšovská at.al., 2017). Historically interesting is serie of books Pivovary Moravy a rakouského Slezska 1869–1900 (“Brewery of Moravia and Austrian Silesia 1869–1900!, Z. Likovský, 2000), České pivovary 1869–1900 (“Czech Breweries 1869–1900”, Z. Likovský, 2005), Pivovary československého území 1900–1948 (“Breweries of the Czechoslovak Territory 1900–1948”, Z. Likovský, 2006), Pivovary českých zemí 1948–1989 (“Breweries of the Czech Lands 1948–1989!, Z. Likovský, 2008), Držitelé, provozovatelé a vedoucí pivovarů Českých zemí 1869–1989 (“Holders, operators and managers of breweries in the Czech Lands 1869–1989”, Z. Likovský, 2010), Brewing and Malting Dictionary (2019).

Collection of brewery yeast

The collection of brewery yeast is run by the staff of the microbiological department. It was created in 1946 as part of the collection of yeast and yeast microorganisms under the guidance of Dr. Kocková-Kratochvílová, since 1953 it is an independent section. Since 1964, the collection has been a member of the Federation of Czech and Slovak Collections of Microorganisms, it is internationally registered under the name RIBM number 655. With its focus on brewery yeast production strains, the RIBM Collection is unique in Central and Eastern Europe.

In 1996, the Collection of Brewery Yeast (as one of the highly specialized and industrially applicable collections) became part of the "National programme on protection of genetic resources of economically significant microorganisms and tiny animals“ and their use in reference diagnostics. This project is also supported by the Czech Government in the form of subsidies from the Ministry of Agriculture of the Czech Republic. The program is run by the Council of Genetic Resources of Microorganisms, which monitors the binding preservation of the functional existence of the collections of microorganisms of the corresponding character.

The collection consists of two types of brewery yeast production strains, which, according to the classification of Kurtzmann and Fell, 1998, belong to species Saccharomyces pastorianus and Saccharomyces cerevisiae. The essential part of the collection consists of the bottom fermenting strains Saccharomyces pastorianus (S. carlsbergensis). Upper fermenting yeast S. cerevisiae is less represented. The collection is continuously replenished and currently it contains more than 100 strains. The individual yeast strains come from the existing and already non-existing mainly European breweries. The parallel collection includes "wild" microorganisms contains several tens of yeast strains of the genus Saccharomyces, Torulaspora, Zygosaccharomyces, Dekker, Williopsis, Pichia, Schizosaccharomyces, Saccharomycodes, Candida, Kloecker, and Rhodotorula. bacteria of the genera Lactobacillus, Leuconostoc, Pediococcus, Tetragenococcus, Lactococcus, Pectinatus, and Megasphaera.

The collections of brewery and wild yeast are kept on wort agar under the waxed cotton wool plug and simultaneously on wort agar coated with sterile paraffin oil separately in a cooling box. These proven methods of keeping cultures enable the strain to be delivered quickly and in an active state on a sloppy agar, possibly fermented to 1.5 L of wort, this allows the transfer of the production strain to production. Since 2006, brewery yeast strains have been stored in cryogenic tubes with a protective medium in liquid nitrogen at -196 °C. Storage in liquid nitrogen (cryopreservation) is considered to be an optimal way of long-term storage of the yeast in a viable state.

Sensory Research Centre

The Sensory Research Centre in Prague was opened in October 2014, it was established as project no. CZ.2.16/3.1.00/28030 of the Operational Program Prague - Competitiveness

The Sensory Research Centre consists of two laboratories: sensory and analytical. By connecting these laboratories with the already existing analytical and technological equipment of the Institute, a unique unit suitable for comprehensive industrial research and development in the area of foodstuff with a focus on beer and other beverages was created. Besides research activities, regular events for the professional public are also held at the centre.

The Sensory Seminar I was drafted in accordance with the standard ČSN ISO 8586 "Sensory Analysis - General Guidelines for the Selection, Training and Monitoring of Assessors' Activity" and the EBC Analysis, Chapter "Sensory Analysis - Selection and Training of the Assessors". The aim of the seminar is to teach the participants to taste the beer correctly. The seminar includes theoretical lectures and practical degustation and is accomplished with a practical test.

Sensory Seminar II. serves to repeat, deepen, expand and, most importantly, to practice regularly the sensory assessment of beer. This seminar contains one extra lecture focusing on the overview and basic sensory characteristics of a number of foreign beers (Lagers, Ale, Stout, Porter, etc.), which are increasingly popular in our market. However, most of the time of the seminar is devoted to practical training.

Sensory tests are conducted according to the standard ČSN ISO 8586 "Sensory Analysis - General Guidelines for the Selection, Training and Monitoring of the Assessors' Activity" and the EBC Analysis, Chapter "Sensory Analysis - Selection and Training of the Assessors". The aim is to verify participants' ability to perform sensory assessment of beer at professional level; successful candidates are awarded a certificate valid for 5 years.

Sensory trainings are held for the closed brewing groups. The scope and selection of the tastes and flavours is based on the customer's wishes.

Commercial activity

The RIBM performs a number of commercial activities, namely in the brewing and malting area:

- Analyses of brewing and malting raw materials, intermediaries and final products and other agricultural commodities;
- Technological consultation;
- Sale of finished products (brewery yeast, wort concentrate);
- Production and publication of statistical overviews on production in the brewing and malting industry and non-alcoholic beverages in the CR.

== Bibliography ==
- Frantík, F., Černohorská, M., 2007: 120 let historie VÚPS v datech. KvasnyPrum. 53(10): 316-317
- Basařová, G., Kosař, K., 2000: Nejslavnější éra českého pivovarnictví. KvasnyPrum. 46 (4): 99–101.
- Basařová, G., Hlaváček, I., Basař, P., Hlaváček, J.: České pivo, 3. vydání, Praha, Havlíček Brain Team, 2011.ČSPS, a: available at http://ceske-pivo.cz/fakta-a-zajimavosti (accessed February 14, 2018)
