= Efes Beverage Group =

Turkish beer company

Anadolu Efes Biracılık ve Malt Sanayii A.Ş.
- Type: Anonim Şirket
- Traded as: BİST: AEFES
- Industry: Beverage
- Founded: 1966; 60 years ago
- Headquarters: Istanbul, Turkey
- Products: Beers, Low Alcohol Drinks, Soft drinks
- Revenue: ▲US$6.70 billion (2024)
- Operating income: ▼US$755 million (2024)
- Net income: ▼US$676 million (2024)
- Total assets: ▼US$10.20 billion (2024)
- Total equity: ▼US$4.92 billion (2024)
- Number of employees: 10,000 (2023)
- Website: anadoluefes.com

Anadolu Efes Biracılık ve Malt Sanayii A.Ş. (lit. Anadolu Efes Brewery and Malt Industries) produces and markets beer and malt and non-alcoholic beverages in Turkey, the United States, Russia, the Commonwealth of Independent States (CIS), Europe, Central Asia and the Middle East. Anadolu Efes is a member of the Anadolu Group. Anadolu Group was founded in 1950 by the Özilhan and Yazıcı families. The Anadolu Group transformed into a holding company in 1969.

Commencing its operations in Turkey in 1969, Anadolu Efes has been the market leader since the 1980s. From the 1990s onwards, the company expanded its operations overseas. Anadolu Efes entered into a strategic partnership with SABMiller. With the agreement signed in 2012, Anadolu Efes took over SABMiller operations in Russia and Ukraine and became the second-largest beer manufacturer in Russia.

Anadolu Efes currently continues its operations as a global company, which exports three quarters of its production. In terms of sales volume, it is the 6th largest brewer in Europe, and the 11th largest in the world. Exporting products to over 70 countries, Anadolu Efes is one of the key players in the region with a total of 15 breweries, six malt production facilities and one hops processing facility across Turkey, Kazakhstan, Russia, Moldova, Georgia and Ukraine.

== Product line ==
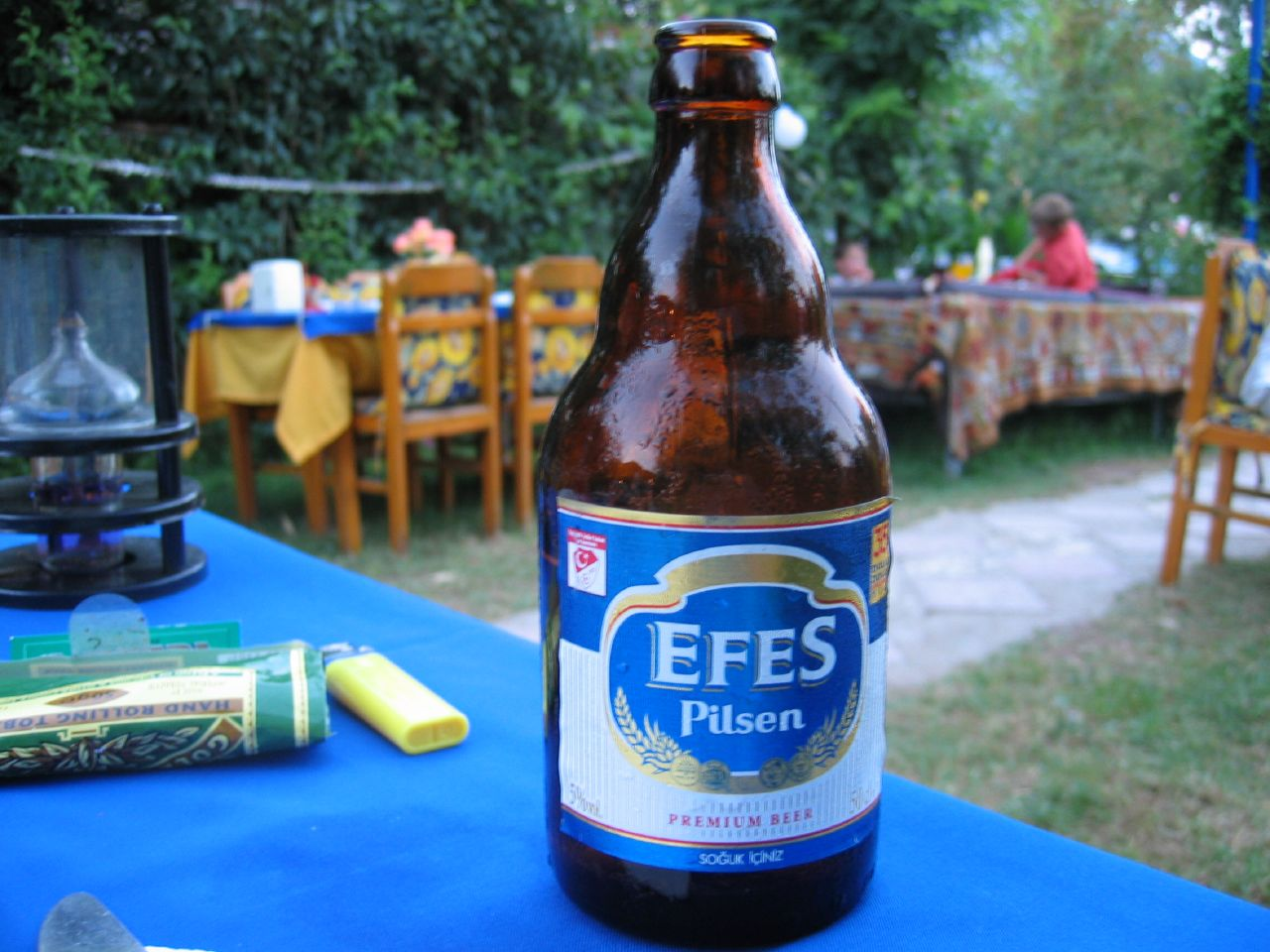
The classic Efes Pilsen bottle

In addition to its flagship Pilsener, Efes also produces several other beers, including Efes Draft, semi-pasteurised, Efes Dark, double-roasted malt lager with 6.5% alcohol and hints of caramel, Efes Light, a 3.0% ABV take on the original, Efes Extra, a hoppier, 7.5% ABV lager, Efes Ice, a softer, more aromatic, ice-brewed version with 4.2% alcohol, and Efes Dark Brown, a 6.1% ABV double-roasted malt lager with a distinct coffee and chocolate bouquet.

Other brands under the Efes Beverage Group are Gusta (5.0% ABV), the company's wheat beer brand; Mariachi, under which the lime or agave-flavored beers Mariachi (4.2% ABV) and Mariachi Black (6.0% ABV) are produced; Marmara, under which the strong-beers Marmara Kırmızı (6.1% ABV) and Marmara Gold (4.1% ABV) are produced; and Ritmix, the company's range of fruit-flavored, non-alcoholic malt drinks.

Various international brands have been brewed, marketed and distributed in Turkey through Efes Beer Group in recent years, including Miller Genuine Draft as of 2000, Beck's as of May 2002, and Foster's Lager as of March 2005.

In addition to the Efes product range, the company offers a wide variety of local brands. These include Stary Melnik, Bely Medved, Gold Mine Beer, Sokol, Krasny Vostok, Vostochnaya Bavaria, Zhigulevskoe, Polniy Nokaut, Green Beer, Dolce Iris, Sib-Beer, Yantarnoe, Solodov, Ershistoe, Barkhatnoe, Bogemskoe svetloe, Ak Bars, in Russia; Karagandinskaya in Kazakhstan; Chisinau, Vitanta Premium Classic in Moldova; Weifert, Weifert Belo, Pils Plus, Zajecarsko Pivo and Standard in Serbia & Montenegro.

Efes Beverage group further produces German Warsteiner, Dutch Bavaria Premium and Amsterdam Navigator, Czech Zlatopramen and Mexican Sol under licence in Russia.

== Market reach ==
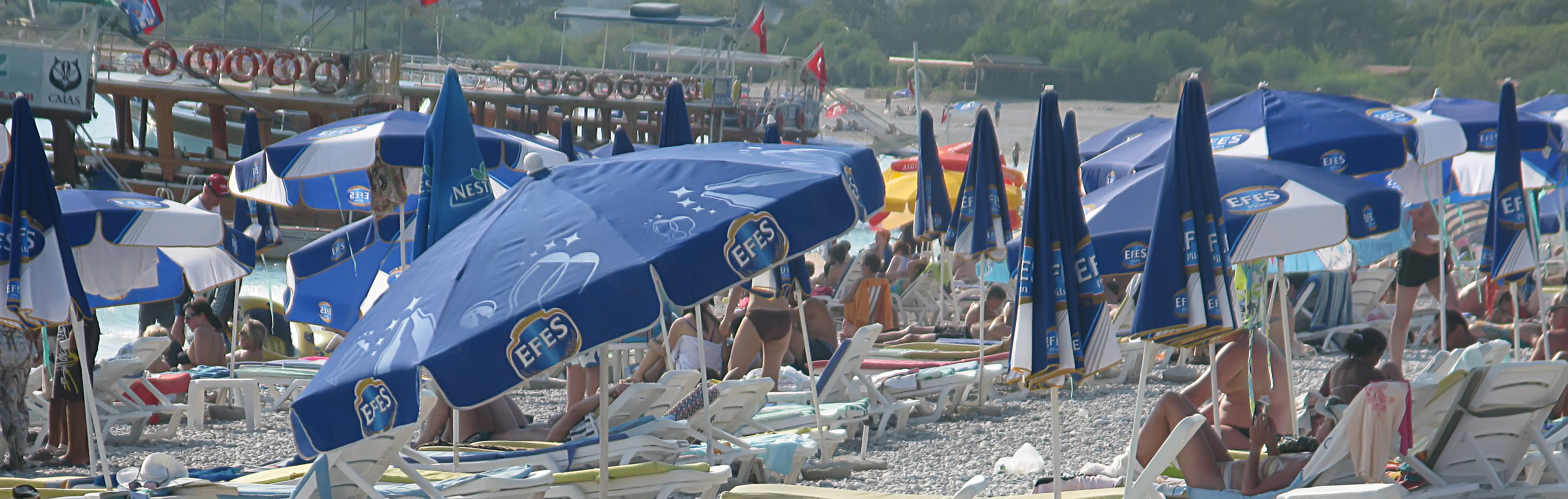
Efes advertisements on umbrellas.

Aside from its domestic market in Turkey, where it has 84% market share, Efes exports to over 50 markets in Africa, Asia, Europe, North America, and Oceania. In the UK, it is sold by the Wetherspoons pub chain.

Efes is also the largest local shareholder of the Coca-Cola franchise in Turkey and produces a range of soft drinks.

Efes brand, the flagship of Efes Beer Group (EBG), revised its logo, label, and bottle design in April 2009.

== Controversies ==
On April 22, 2022, AB InBev, a multinational brewing company, announced its decision to sell its interest in its Russian joint venture as part of its response to the Russian invasion of Ukraine. The company stated that it was in discussions to transfer its stake in the joint venture to its partner, Turkey-based Anadolu Efes. This move aligned with AB InBev's broader commitment to halting business operations in Russia and supporting Ukraine during the conflict.

On March 15, 2023, Carlsberg Group denied a media report claiming it had sold its Russian breweries to Turkey-based Anadolu Efes. The Danish brewing company clarified that while it was pursuing the sale of its Russian operations following its decision to exit the market due to the Russian invasion of Ukraine, no deal had been finalized with Anadolu Efes or any other buyer at the time.

Turkey’s Anadolu Efes introduced new products in Russia, including an energy drink and alcohol-free beer, as noted in its 2023 first-quarter earnings report. Anheuser-Busch InBev had earlier agreed to sell its stake in a Russian joint venture to its partner, Anadolu Efes, which would become the sole owner of the business, according to a regulatory filing. However, in August 2024, the Russian government declined to approve the agreement, which would have granted Anadolu Efes full control of the joint venture operating in Russia and Ukraine. The deal stipulated that Anadolu Efes, already managing the business unit in Russia, would not make any payments for its partner's non-controlling stake in the AB InBev Efes joint venture, established six years prior. By the end of October, the companies announced plans to separate the joint venture, with Anadolu Efes retaining the Russian operations and AB InBev taking control of the Ukrainian business.

== See also ==
- List of food companies
- Anadolu Efes S.K.
