= Czech Beer Festival =

Beer festival in Prague, Czech Republic

Coordinates: 50°3′35.18″N 14°11′7.57″E

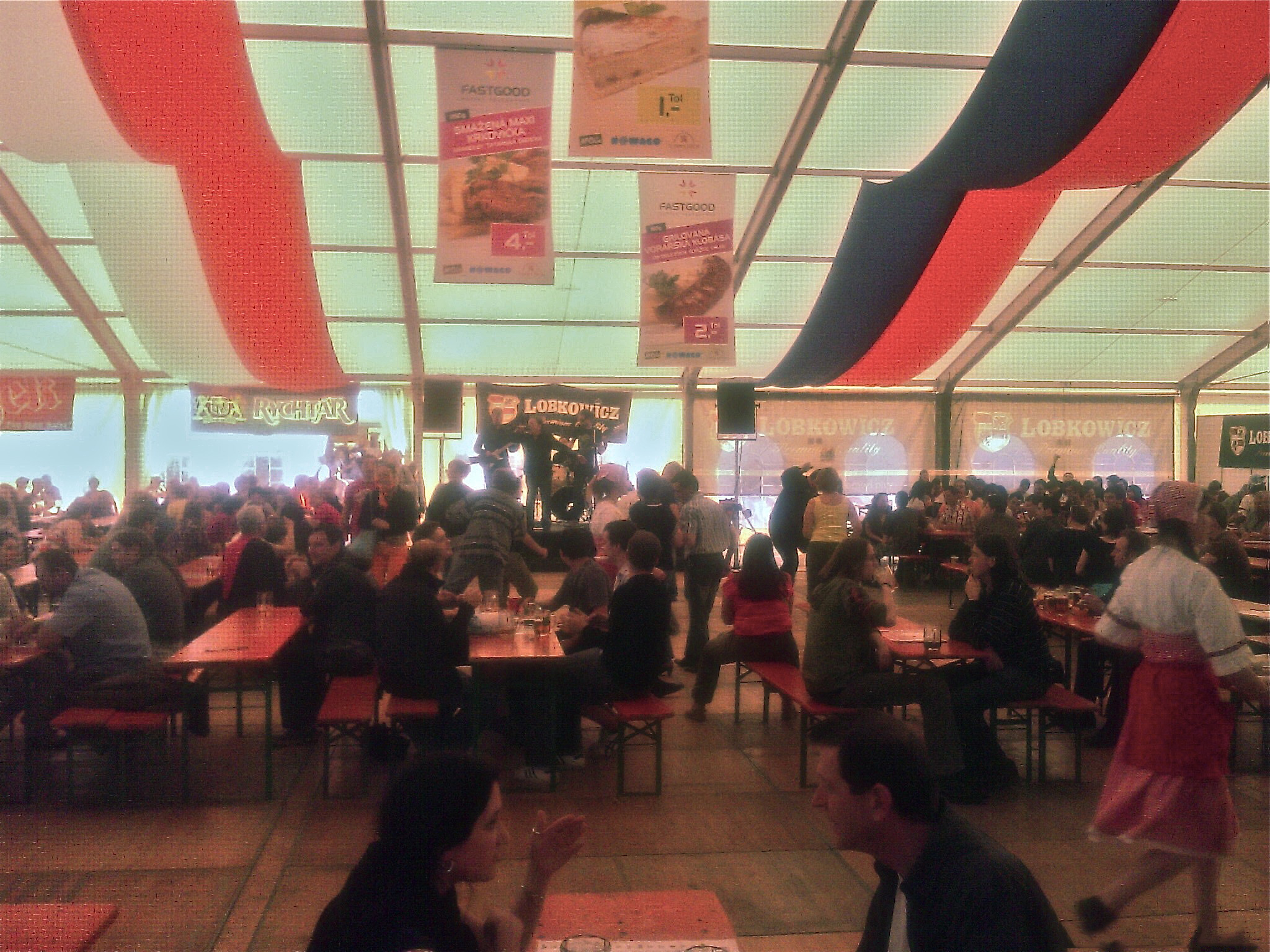
Czech Beer Festival 2010

Czech Beer Festival (Czech: Český pivní festival) was the biggest beer festival in the Czech Republic, held for 17 days every year in May in Prague between 2008-2018. The festival featured around 120 different beers, including 70 Czech brands and other foreign brews, for example those from the United States and the United Kingdom, with up to 10,000 seating capacity and service provided by around 200 girls and boys dressed in Czech traditional costumes.

British newspaper The Financial Times ranked the festival to be among 40 global events that you should visit in 2012. Formerly, visitors used a special currency, the Tolar, to pay for beer and food at the festival, later a magnetic cards, to which visitors can load any amount of cash.

The first smaller version of Czech Beer Festival outside the country was held in September 2010 in Frankfurt, the next year it also spread to Berlin and Moscow. The largest was in Moscow in the VDNKh park, with a capacity of 10,000 seats. In 2013 it also debuted in Chicago and New York.

The festival has been canceled in 2019 after a disagreement with the local government of Prague 7 (Praha sobě), and also with the Prague City Assembly (Piráti). The 2020 edition was not held due to the COVID-19 pandemic in the Czech Republic. It is unclear whether the festival will ever return. It has been then replaced by a similar event Prague Beer Fest, which focuses more on a smaller craft breweries.

== See also ==
- Beer in the Czech Republic
