= Březňák =

Czech beer brand

Coordinates: 50°39′53.4″N 14°8′20.08″E

- Březňák
- Type: Beer
- Manufacturer: Velké Březno Brewery
- Distributor: Heineken N.V.
- Origin: Czech Republic
- Introduced: 1753
- Website: https://www.breznak.cz/

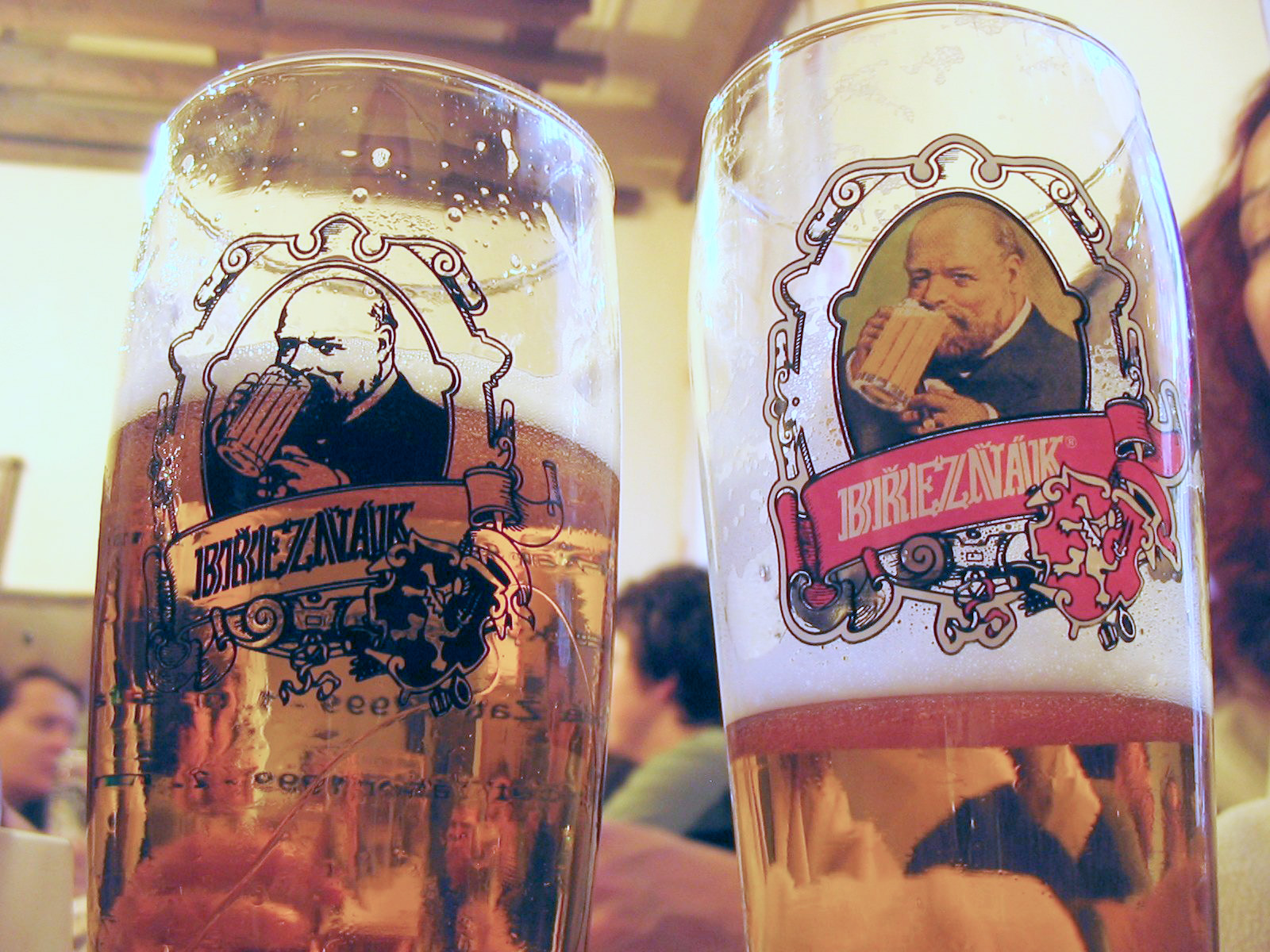
Březňák beer

Březňák is a brand of a pilsner-type beer produced in Velké Březno near Ústí nad Labem, Czech Republic. It gets brewed by a brewery which was founded in 1753. Since 2008, the Velké Březno Brewery is owned by the Heineken N.V. group.

== History ==
Brewery was first mentioned in 1606. In 1753 Ferdinand Bonaventura Count Harrach built a new court and brewery. In 1841 it was bought by the Czech governor Karel Count Chotek and in 1896 transformed into a joint stock company headed by Karel Chotek.

== Products ==
- Březňák Světlé výčepní – a 10° pale draught beer with 4.1% ABV.
- Březňák 11 – a 11° pale lager with 4.6% ABV.
- Březňák Ležák – a 12° pale lager with 4.9% ABV.
- Březňák 14 – a 14° special beer with 6.5% ABV.

== See also ==
- Beer in the Czech Republic
