= Gabriela Basařová =

Czech chemist and professor (1934–2019)

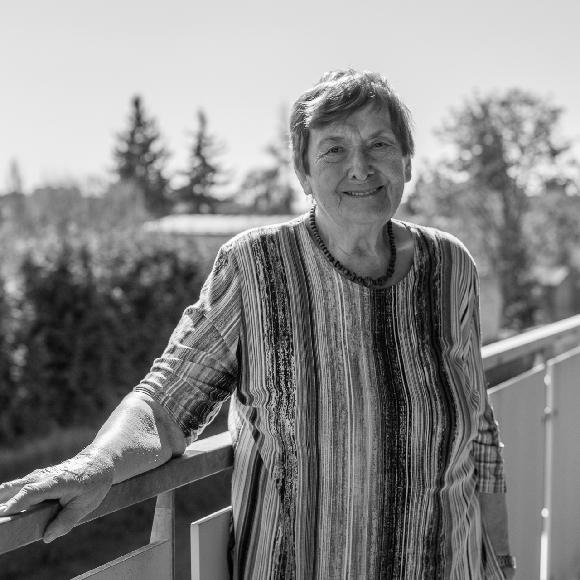
Gabriela Basařová, 2017

Gabriela Basařová (17 January 1934 – 18 October 2019) was a Czech professor of chemistry, working in the field of fermentation chemistry, brewing, and malting. Most of her scientific and research work was devoted to the study of non-biological, so-called colloidal, turbidity of beer and methods of delaying its production during storage. She participated in scientific, educational and publishing activities in the Czech Republic and abroad, and published 538 items, mostly in foreign journals. In 2012, Basařová was awarded the State Medal of Merit.

== Early life and education ==
Gabriela Basařová was born in Plzeň, 17 January 1934. She graduated from high school, where chemistry and mathematics were among her favorite subjects. During her studies, she worked in laboratories, in a waterworks, distillery, canning factory, and in Plzeň breweries, after which, she decided to study brewing. In 1952, she graduated from the University of Chemistry and Technology, Prague (VŠCHT), majoring in fermentation chemistry and technology, specializing in malting and brewing.

In the following years, she gradually gained scientific and pedagogical degrees in the Czech Republic. In 1957, she defended her diploma thesis on the topic, "Monitoring of oxygen bonding during wort production" (supervisor: Prof. Ing. Josef Dyr, DrSc.), obtaining the title Ing. chemistry. In 1965, she was awarded the CSc. Degree (Candidate of Sciences, today PhD.) after defending her doctoral thesis "New Stabilization Methods with a view to shortening the lying time of beer". In 1980, she was appointed doctor of technical sciences (DrSc.) after defending her dissertation thesis on the study of the rationalization and modernization of methods of increasing the colloidal stability of beer.

== Career ==
After graduating from the Institute of Chemical Technology, she joined the then Plzeň breweries, now known as Plzeňský Prazdroj, (Pilsner Urquell Brewery) where she worked in 1957–1967. She led the laboratories and the technology group, and established a research center that looked into the possibilities of modernizing the technological process of Prazdroj beer production, without affecting its specific and characteristic properties. In 1967, she left that organization for the Research Institute of Brewing and Malting in Prague, where she founded and headed the Biochemical Department. From 1978 to 1982, she was its director. In cooperation with research centers, mainly in Eastern European countries, the institute researched and coordinated national and international projects. In providing technological assistance, it cooperated with Czech, Slovak, Yugoslav, Bulgarian and other breweries.

In 1981, Basařová was appointed professor of fermentation chemistry and bioengineering in the field of malting and brewing; and became the external head of the Institute of Fermentation Chemistry and Bioengineering, ICT Prague, where in 1982, she became permanently employment. She led the institute for the next 25 years until 1997, lecturing on the subjects of malting, brewing, modern biotechnology, viticulture, and bioecology.

In her scientific and research work, she dealt with the properties of raw materials and their influence on beer quality, innovations of technological processes and analytical methods for the needs of malting and brewing, study of brewing yeast metabolism and importance of yeast strains for characteristic beer types, as well as technological variants of their reduction. Most of her scientific and research work was devoted to the study of non-biological, so-called colloidal, turbidity of beer and methods of delaying their production during storage. This work was followed by the introduction of optimal technological stabilization procedures in order to increase the physical-chemical stability of beer.

In addition to the management of the institute (formerly the name of the department) at the ICT, she was for many years chair of the committee for state examinations and defense of diploma theses in the field of fermentation chemistry and bioengineering, chairman of the committees for defense of candidate (CSc.). She led the Commission of the Ministry of Education for the Defense and Appointment of Doctor of Technical Sciences in the field of Fermentation Chemistry and Technology (DrSc.), and became Vice-Chair of the Commission for the Defense of Doctorate of Technical Sciences (DrSc.) in the field of food chemistry and technology. She also worked in similar bodies in Slovakia. She led dozens of theses and doctoral theses in postgraduate university studies.

She was a member of the Scientific Board of the Research Institute of Brewing and Malting in Prague for many years, a member of the Scientific Councils of the Food Research Institute in Prague, the Institute of Chemical Technology, and the Faculty of Food and Biochemical Technology. She was also involved in the editorial board of the journal Kvasný průmysl. Basařová was a member of the Supervisory Board of Budweiser Budvar Brewery in České Budějovice. She worked in the central bodies of the Czechoslovak Scientific Society, the Czech Academy of Agricultural Sciences, and the Czechoslovak Chemical and Microbiological Society. She was a member of the Working Party of Education (EBC) for the Expert Training Committee of the European Biotechnology Convention, and was also affiliated with Technische Universität Berlin.

Her publishing activities include 538 items, most of which were published in foreign journals in Germany, Japan, Bulgaria, Poland, United States, England, Serbia and other countries. She lectured at domestic and foreign symposia. In addition to professional books, scientific articles, lectures, posters, research and expert reports, patents, script, her writing included works related to the history of Czech brewing intended for the general public and promotion of Czech beer abroad.

Basařová died in Prague, 18 October 2019.

== Awards and honors ==
- Best Employee of the Prazdroj Brewery (1965)
- Outstanding Employee of the Ministry of Agriculture and Food (1973)
- Meritorious Employee of the Breweries and Maltsters Group (1982)
- honors from ČVTS, ČAZ, Chemical and Microbiological Society on the Development of the Brewing and Malting Industry in Slovakia (1984)
- Honorable Mention of the Rector of ICT (1985)
- Commemorative Medal of B. Štefanovský in cooperation with the Polytechnic in Łódži (1985)
- Commemorative Medal of FPBT ICT (1994) 1999)
- Commemorative Medal of prof. Votočka ICT (2000)
- Journalist Personality of the Year in the brewing industry (2000)
- Inducted to the Hall of Fame of Czech brewing and malting (2002)
- Honorary Connoisseur title, awarded by Plzeňský Prazdroj (2011)
- Medal of Merit for the State in Science, Education and Education (October 28, 2012)
- City Historical Seal of Plzeň (2015)

== Selected works ==
=== Books ===
- Basařová, G., Čepička, J.:1985: Sladařství a pivovarství (skriptum), SNTL Prague
- Kolektiv autorů: 1986: Kvasinky ve výzkumu a praxi, Československá akademie věd, Prague, 379 s.
- Basařová, G., Nielebock, C.: 1989: Analysemethoden für die Brau- und Malzindustrie, Verlag: Leipzig, Fachbuchverlag Leipzig, 1989, ISBN 3343004030 / ISBN 9783343004034, 271 pp.
- Basařová, G., Doležalová, A., Kahler, M., Čepička, J.: 1992 (1. a 2. díl), 1993 (3. díl): Pivovarsko-sladařská analytika. MERKANTA s.r.o. Prague, 996 s.
- Basařová G., 2005: Carl Joseph Napoleon Balling – Professor an der Technischen Hochschule in Prag 1805–1868. In: Gesellschaft für Geschichte des Brauwesens e. V.: Jahrbuch 2005. Berlin 2005, S. 27–45.
- Basařová, G., Šavel, J., Basař, P., Lejsek, T.: 2010: Pivovarství: Teorie a praxe výroby piva, VŠCHT Prague. ISBN, 978-80-7080-734-7, 863 s.
- Basařová, G., Hlaváček, I., Basař, P., Hlaváček, J.:2011: České pivo. Třetí rozšířené vydání.. Havlíček Brain Team, Prague. ISBN 978-80-87109-25-0, 309 s.
- Basařová, G. a kol.: 2014: Sladařství. Teorie a praxe výroby sladu. Havlíček Brain Team, Prague. ISBN 978-80-87109-47-2, 626 s.

=== Articles ===
- Basařová, G.: The Structure-function, Relationship of Polymeric Sorbents for Colloid Stabilization of Beer. Food Structure, 1990, 9(3), 175–194.
- Basařová, G., Lejsek, T.: Přímé spektrofotometrické stanovení dusíku. Kvasný Prum, 1970 16 (9) 192-197 Dostupné online
- Basařová, G., Turková, J.: Eigenschaften, Bindungsweise und Applikation von gebundenem, Papain an Hydroxylalkylmethacrylatgele. Brauwissenschaft 1977, 30(7), 207–209.
- Basařová, G., Škach J., Černá I.: Použití československých adsorbentů při výrobě koloidně stabilních piv. Kvasny Prum. 1977; 23(9): 193-197
- Basařová, G., Černá, I., Škach, J.: Význam a způsob úpravy polyfenolových látek v pivovarské technologii. Kvasny Prum. 1977; 23(4): 73-77
- Basařová, G., Škach J., Budín, J., Kubánek, V.: Úprava koncentrace polyfenolových látek v pivu práškovitým Sorsilenem. Kvasny Prum. 1979; 25(10): 217-221
- Basařová, G., Škach, J., Kubánek, V., Veruovič B.: Způsob hodnocení texturních technologických a sorpčních vlastností adsorbentu polyfenolových látek Sorbamid. Kvasny Prum. 1983; 29(9): 193-200
- Novák, J., Basařová, G., Teixeira J.A., Vicente, A.A.: Monitoring of Brewing Yeast Propagation under Aerobic and Anaerobic Conditions Employing Flow Cytometry. J. Inst. Brew. 2007, 113(3), 249–255.
