= Zlatopramen =

Brand of beer

- Type: Beer
- Manufacturer: Velké Březno Brewery
- Distributor: Heineken N.V.
- Country of origin: Czech Republic
- Introduced: 1967
- Website: https://www.zlatopramen.cz/

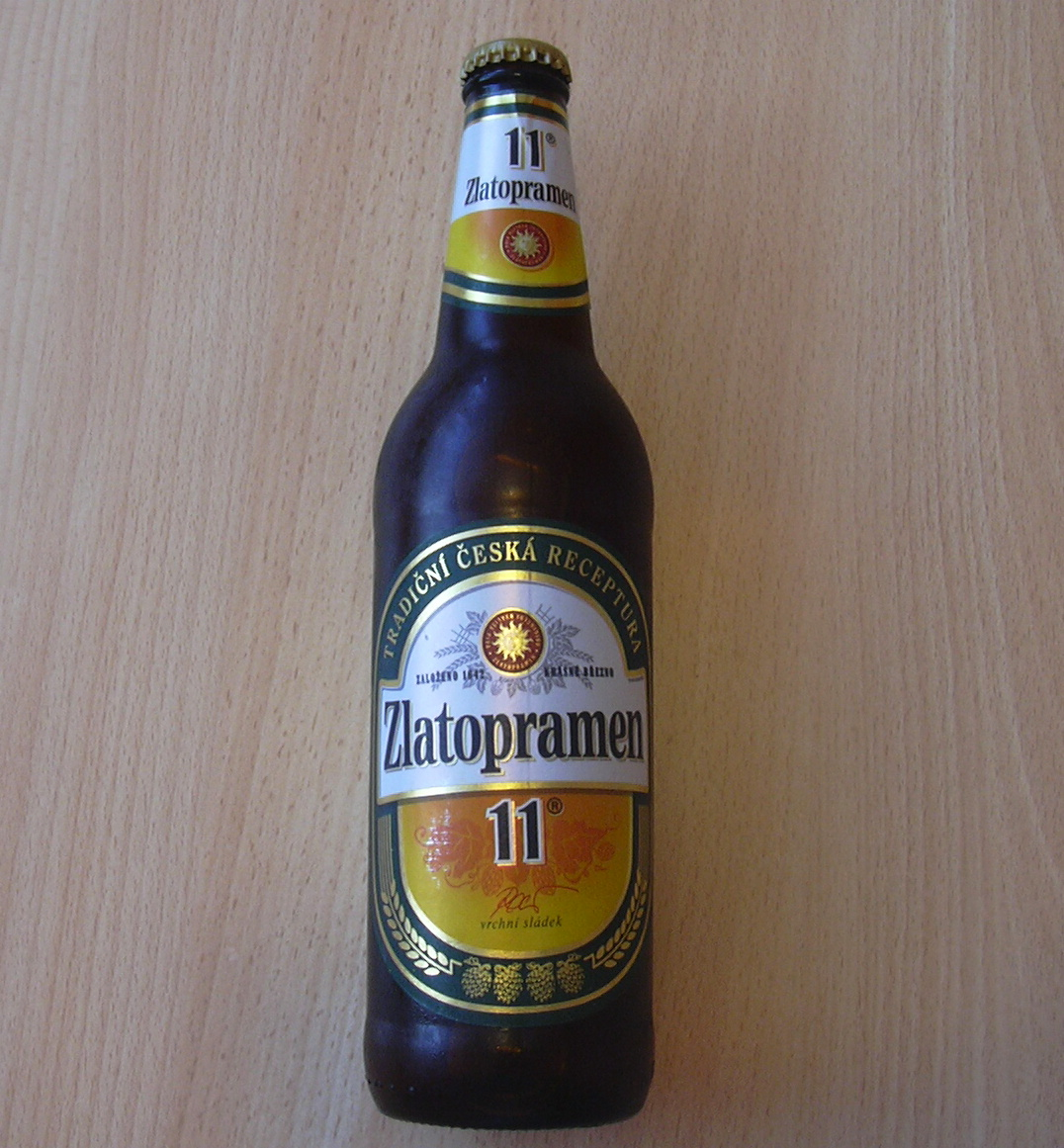
Bottle of Zlatopramen 11 °

Zlatopramen (meaning "golden well") is a brand of beer that was produced by Drinks Union, later by Heineken in the Krásné Březno brewery.

The Zlatopramen brand was first registered in 1967, when it was chosen after a naming competition. In 2011, the Krásné Březno brewery was closed and Zlatopramen continued to be brewed by other breweries of the Heineken N.V. Group.

== See also ==
- Beer in the Czech Republic
- Staropramen Brewery
