= U Fleků =

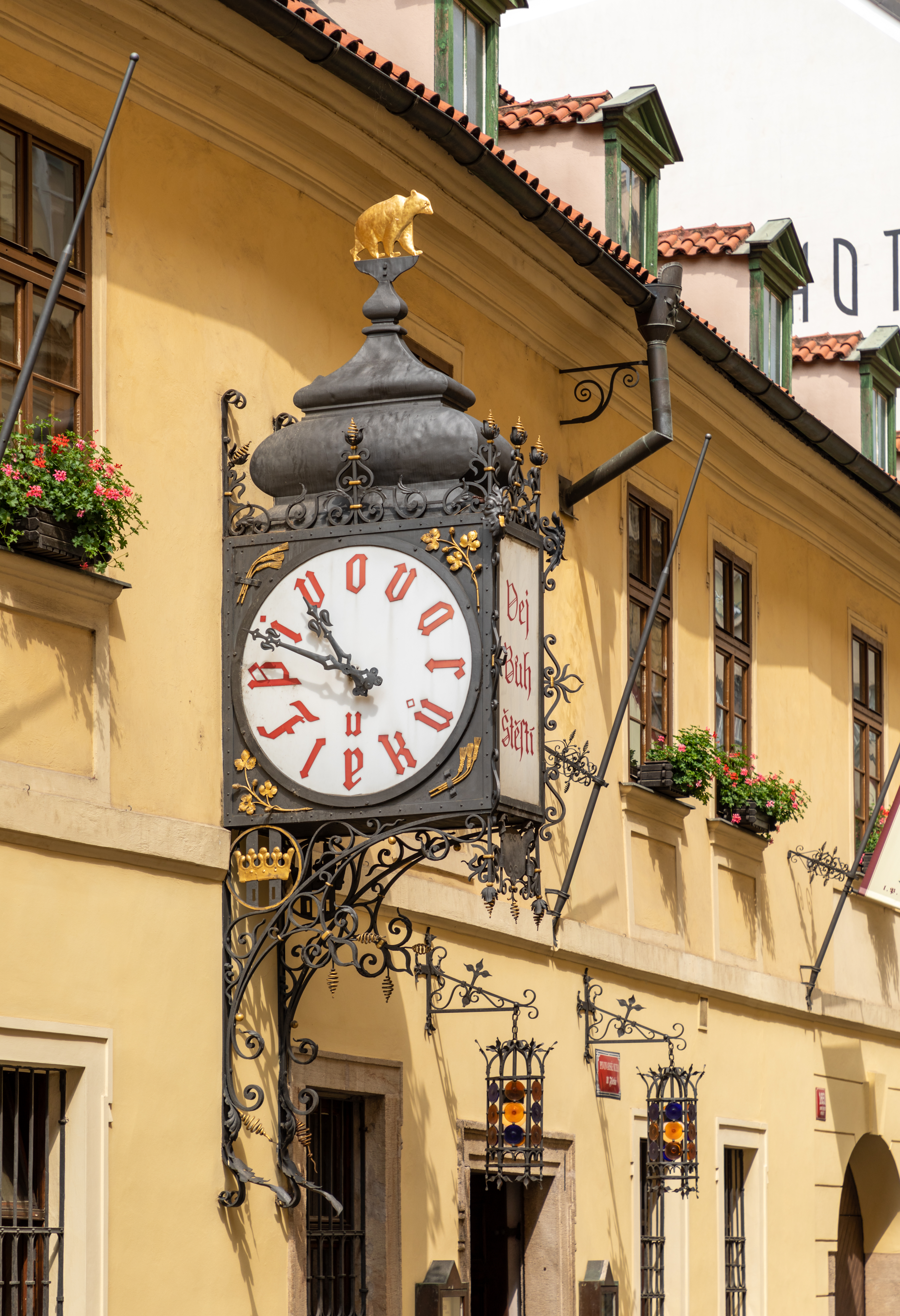
- Interactive map of U Fleků

Restaurant information
- Established: 1499
- Owner: Pivovar a restaurace U Fleků s.r.o.
- Location: Křemencova 11, Prague 1, 110 00, Czech Republic
- Coordinates: 50.0788°N 14.4172°E
- Website: ufleku.cz

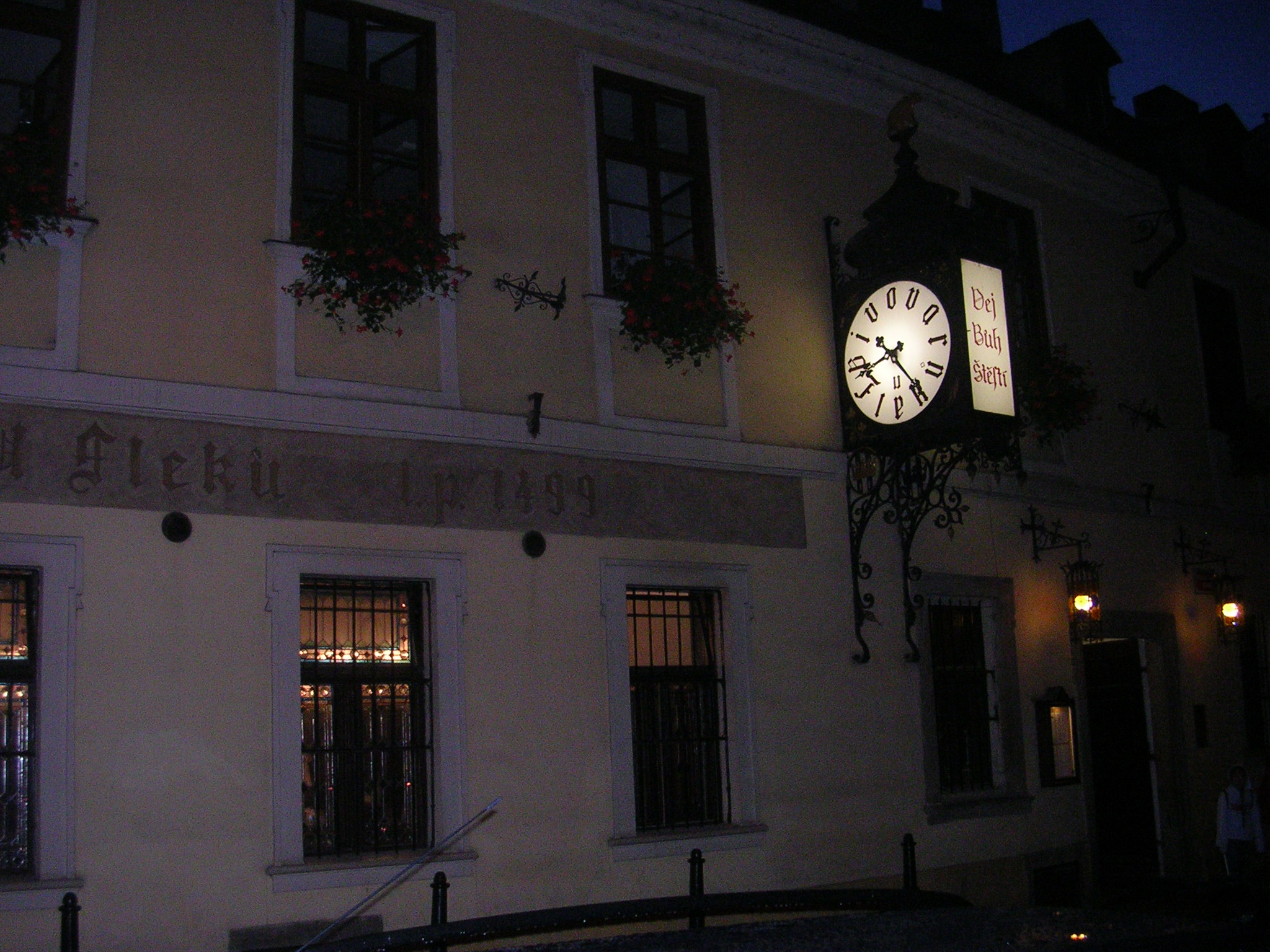
A night view of the facade

U Fleků is a pub and microbrewery in Prague, Czech Republic. It occupies buildings around a central courtyard at Křemencova 11 in New Town (Praha 1), not far from the National Theatre. The front facade of the building has an old, highly decorated clock above its door.

== History ==
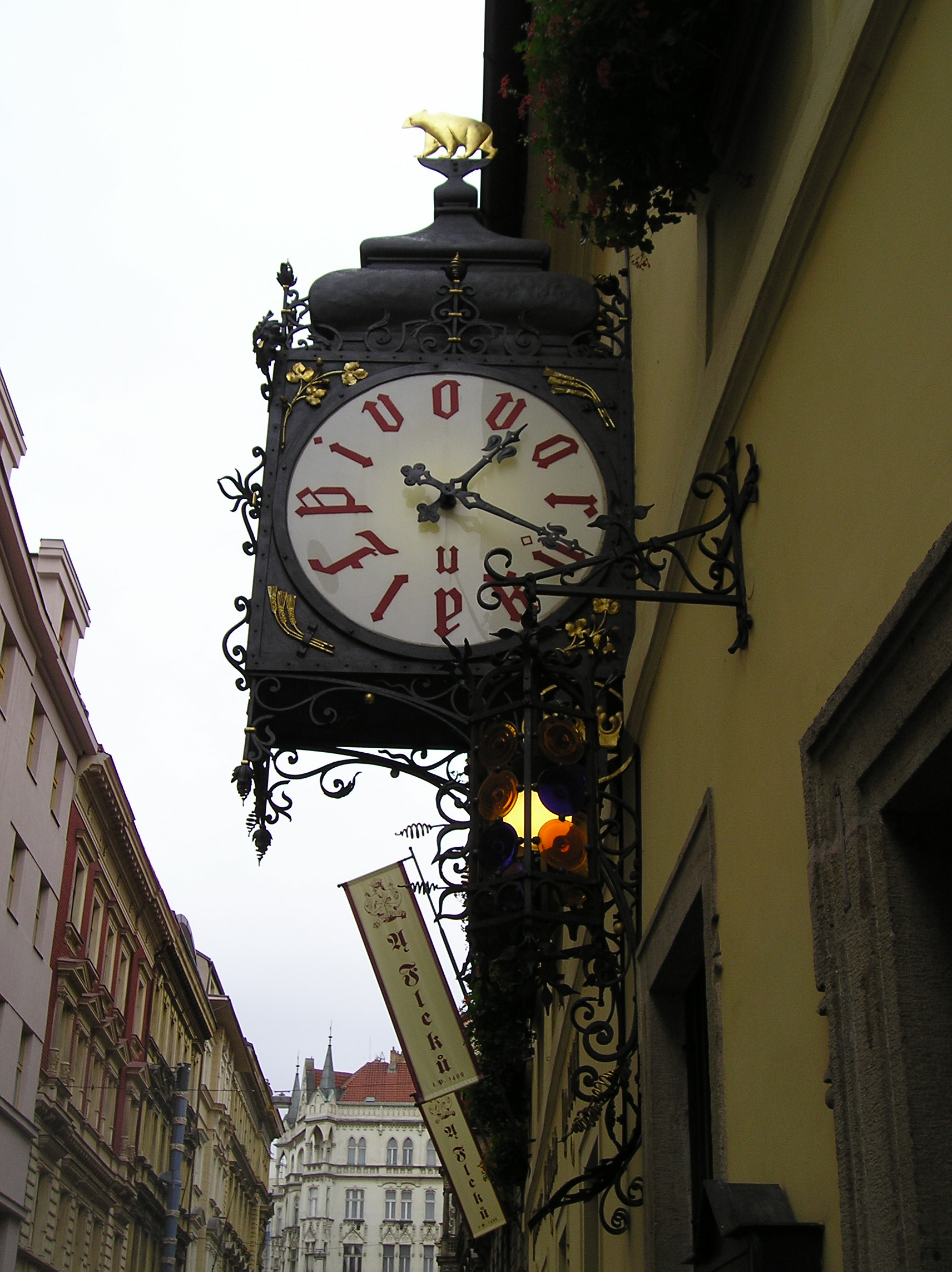
Street view

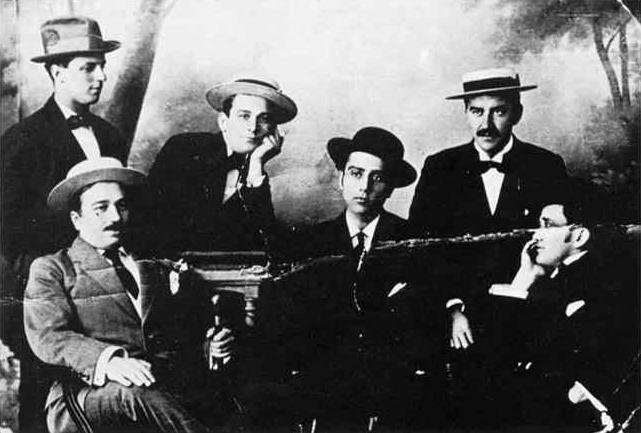
Founding members of Hajduk Split, at U Fleků

Originally a family business, the pub was founded in 1499, and therefore celebrated its 500th anniversary in 1999. It has been referred to as the oldest brewery in Prague. In 1762 the brewery was bought by Jakub Flekovský, which gave its current name: U Fleků means in Czech "At the Fleks'". After World War II the company was nationalized, and control was transferred to a board of management appointed by the state. Following the Velvet Revolution, the company was privatized.

== The pub today ==
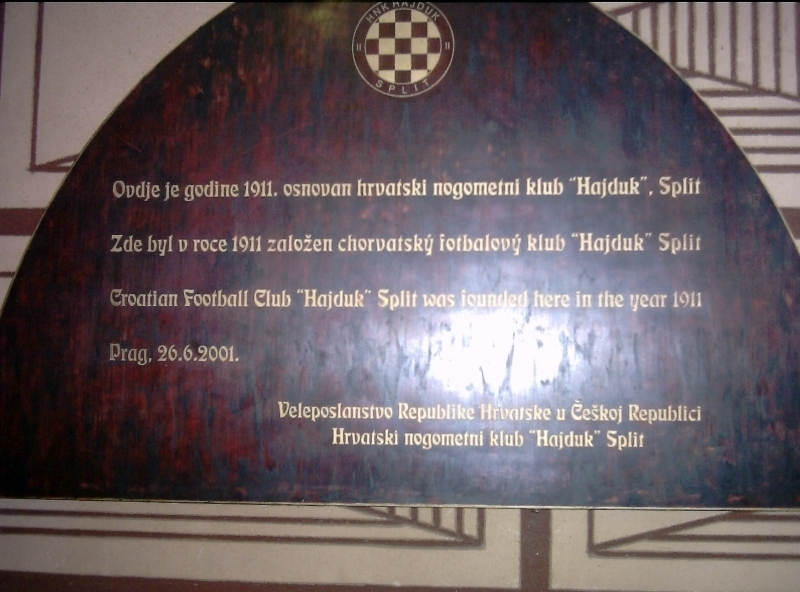
The plaque commemorating the founding of Croatian football club Hajduk at the pub in 1911

Customers can sit in the open air beer garden or inside the restaurant. There are eight halls (rooms) to choose from, with the most famous one, with its original designs, called "Academy" (Czech: Akademie). Most of the halls are open for large groups only (with total seating for 1200). Customers sit at, and often share, long wooden tables and benches. Often strolling accordion and/or tuba players provide entertainment, and some customers like to sing along. On some nights, there is also a live cabaret show (fee, reservations needed). It features international dance routines (including Czech polka) and comedy.

There is a detailed museum tour in the former malt house building of the brewery, mainly explaining the brewing process over the centuries, with original machinery on display, and with taped audio (including English) (fee, reservations needed). There is also a tour of the brewery during the week, with a short film, beer tasting, and souvenir (fee, reservations needed). Visitors can also purchase an array of souvenirs at their gift shop, including a multitude of beer steins.

Tall dark wood panels decorate the walls, including some paintings and plaques. One plaque that hangs on the pub's wall commemorates the founding at the pub of HNK Hajduk Split, a successful Croatian football club from Split (then also a part of the Austro-Hungarian Empire). The club was founded in 1908 but registered by Austrian authorities in 1911. The club was founded by group of students from Split (Fabijan Kaliterna, Lucijan Stella, Ivan Šakić and Vjekoslav Ivanišević). They went to the pub right after the match between Sparta Prague and Slavia Prague and liked the sport so much that they decided to bring the game to their Dalmatian hometown.

== Brewing ==
The pub has two kinds of beer, these being dark and light lager. Both are 5 percent alcohol ABV, brewed at 13° plato. The beers, Flekovský Tmavý Ležák 13° ("The Flek Dark Lager at 13°P"), also known as Flekovská třináctka ("The Flek Thirteen"), and Flekovský Světlý Ležák 13° ("The Flek Lighter Lager at 13°P") are brewed on the premises and are not available anywhere else. Traditional Czech meals are served. Prices are considerably higher than other local pubs, and beer is served in measures of 40cl as opposed to the 50cl standard in almost all other Czech pubs. However, the dark beer is thought by some to be the best in Prague.
