= Budweiser (disambiguation) =

Budweiser is an American-style pale lager produced by Anheuser-Busch.

Budweiser may also refer to:

- Budweiser, a person or product from České Budějovice, Czech Republic
- Budweiser Bier Bürgerbräu, a brewery founded in 1795 in České Budějovice
- Budweiser Budvar Brewery, a brewery founded in 1895 in České Budějovice
  - Budweiser Budvar, a pale lager produced by Budweiser Budvar Brewery
- A nickname for the U.S. Navy Special Warfare insignia
- "Budweiser", a song by Fear from American Beer, 2000
- "Budweiser", a song by Nate Haller from Party in the Back, 2022

== See also ==
- Budweiser 500 (disambiguation)
- Bud Weiser (1891-1961), American baseball player
- Bud Wiser (1929–2017), American television director
