= Budweiser trademark dispute =

Legal conflict between Anheuser–Busch and Budweiser Budvar Brewery

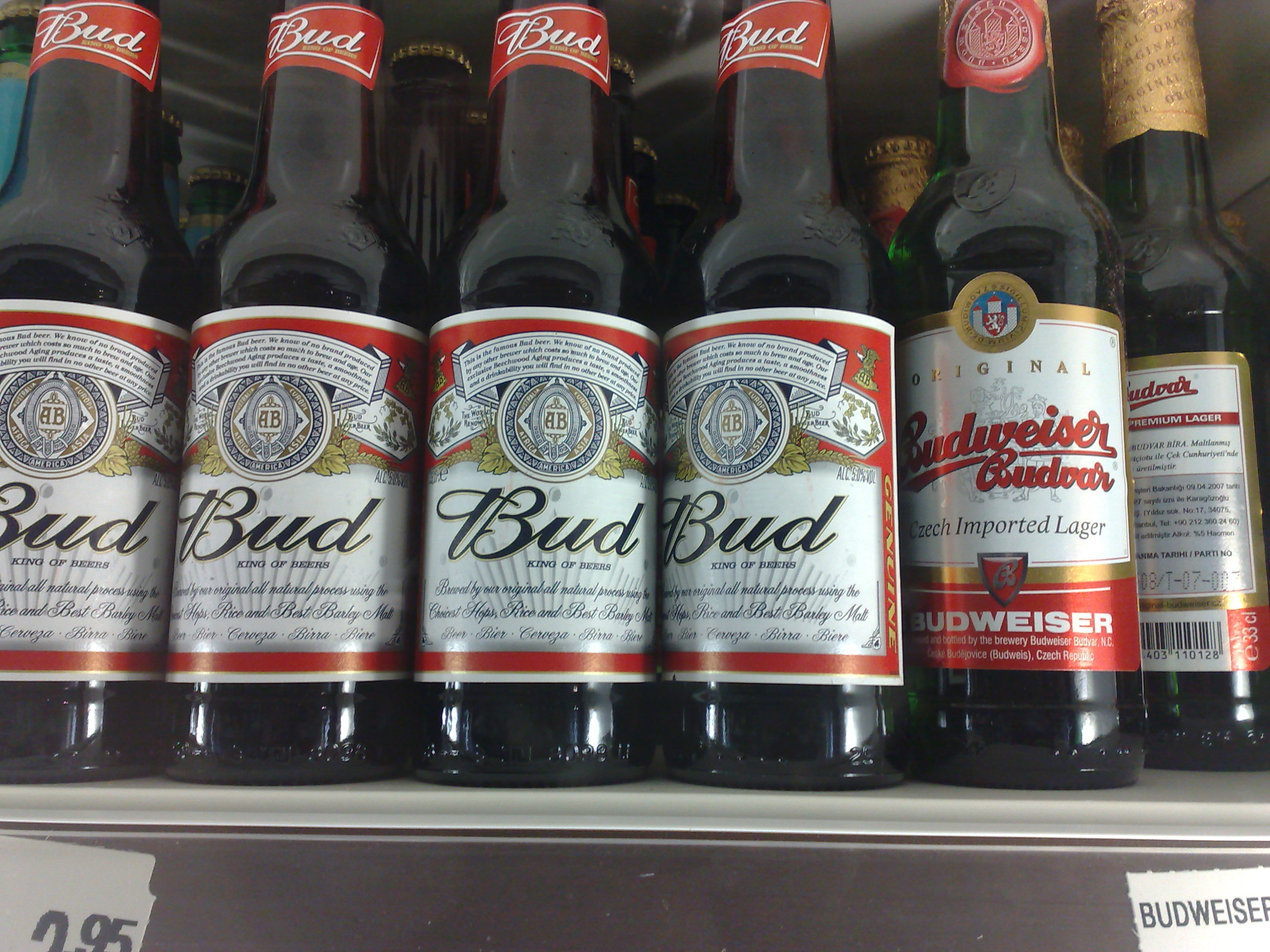
American Budweiser sold in the European Union as "Bud" next to Czech Budweiser

The Budweiser trademark dispute is an ongoing series of legal disputes between two beer companies (the Czech Budweiser Budvar Brewery, and the Belgian-American AB InBev) who claim trademark and geographic indication rights to the name "Budweiser". The dispute has been ongoing since 1907, and has involved more than 100 court cases around the world. As a result, Budweiser Budvar has the rights to the name Budweiser in most of Europe and AB InBev has this right in North America. Consequently, AB InBev uses the name "Bud" in most of Europe and Budvar sells its beer in North America under the name "Czechvar". In other territories, one or the other or even both may use the name, depending on local trademark law.

== Background ==
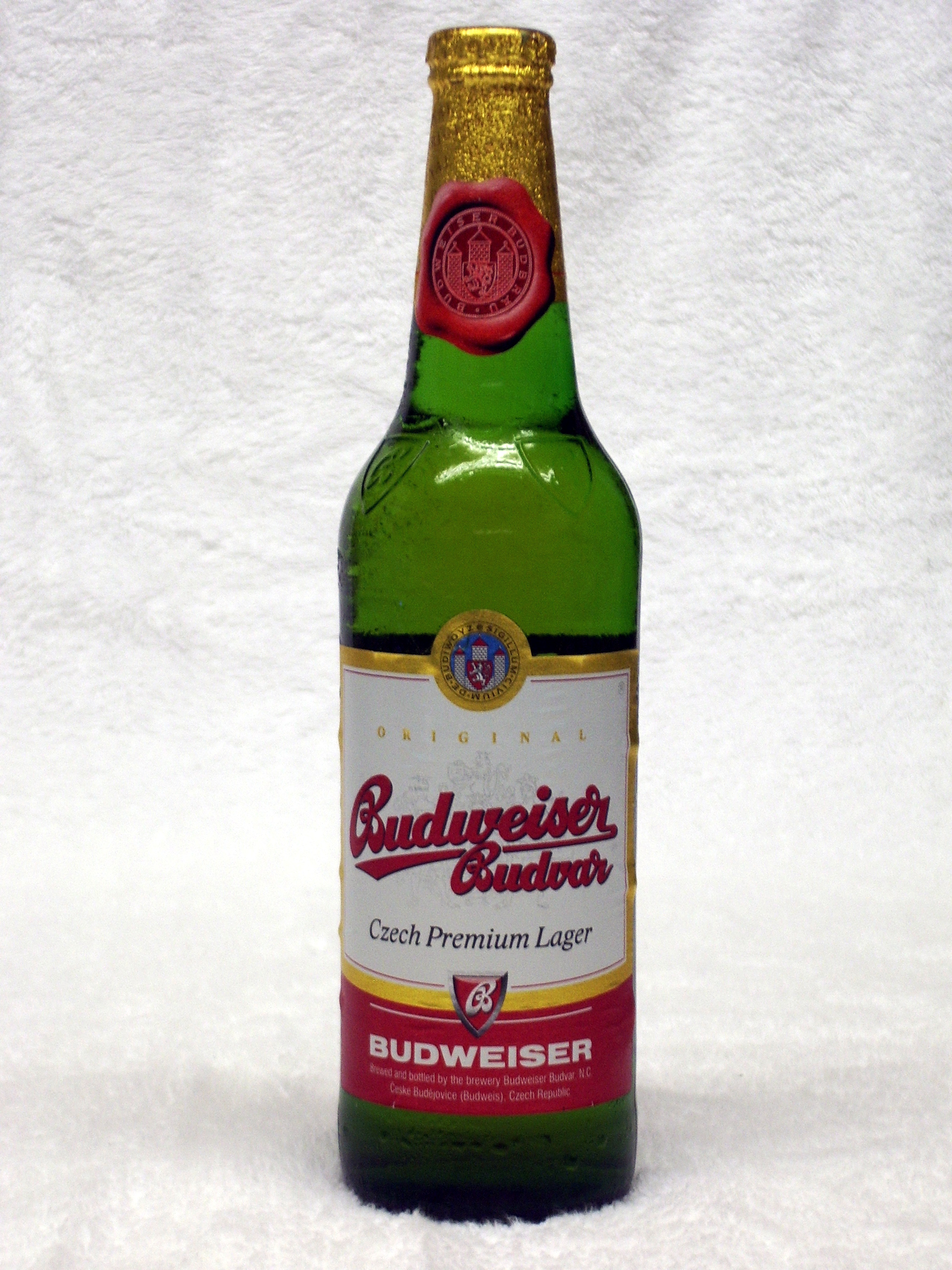
Bottled Czech Budweiser Budvar sold in Europe

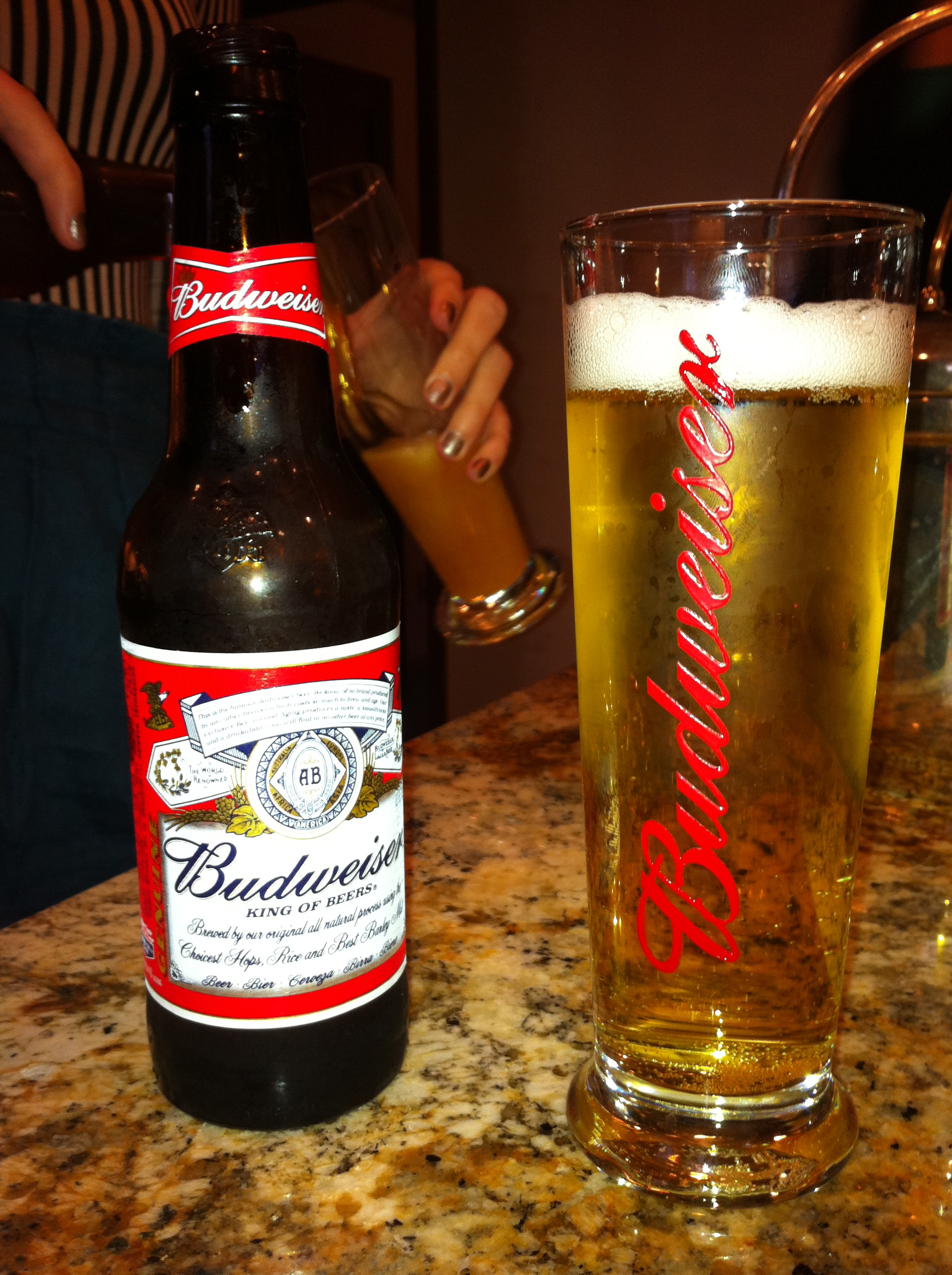
American Budweiser sold in the United States

Beer brewing in the city of České Budějovice (German: Budweis), which was then in the Kingdom of Bohemia and is now in the Czech Republic, dates back to the 13th century, when the city was granted brewing rights during the reign of Ottokar II of Bohemia. During the time when both Czech and German were official languages in the kingdom, two breweries were founded in the city. Both breweries made beer which they called "Budweiser", similar to how brewers in the city of Plzeň (German: Pilsen) made a beer generically called Pilsner. The beer from Budweis began being exported to the United States in 1872–73 and then again beginning in 1933. In 1876, the American brewer Anheuser-Busch began making a beer which they also called "Budweiser", motivated in part by a desire to "brew a beer similar in quality, color, flavor and taste to the beer then made at Budweis", according to Adolphus Busch.

== Parties ==
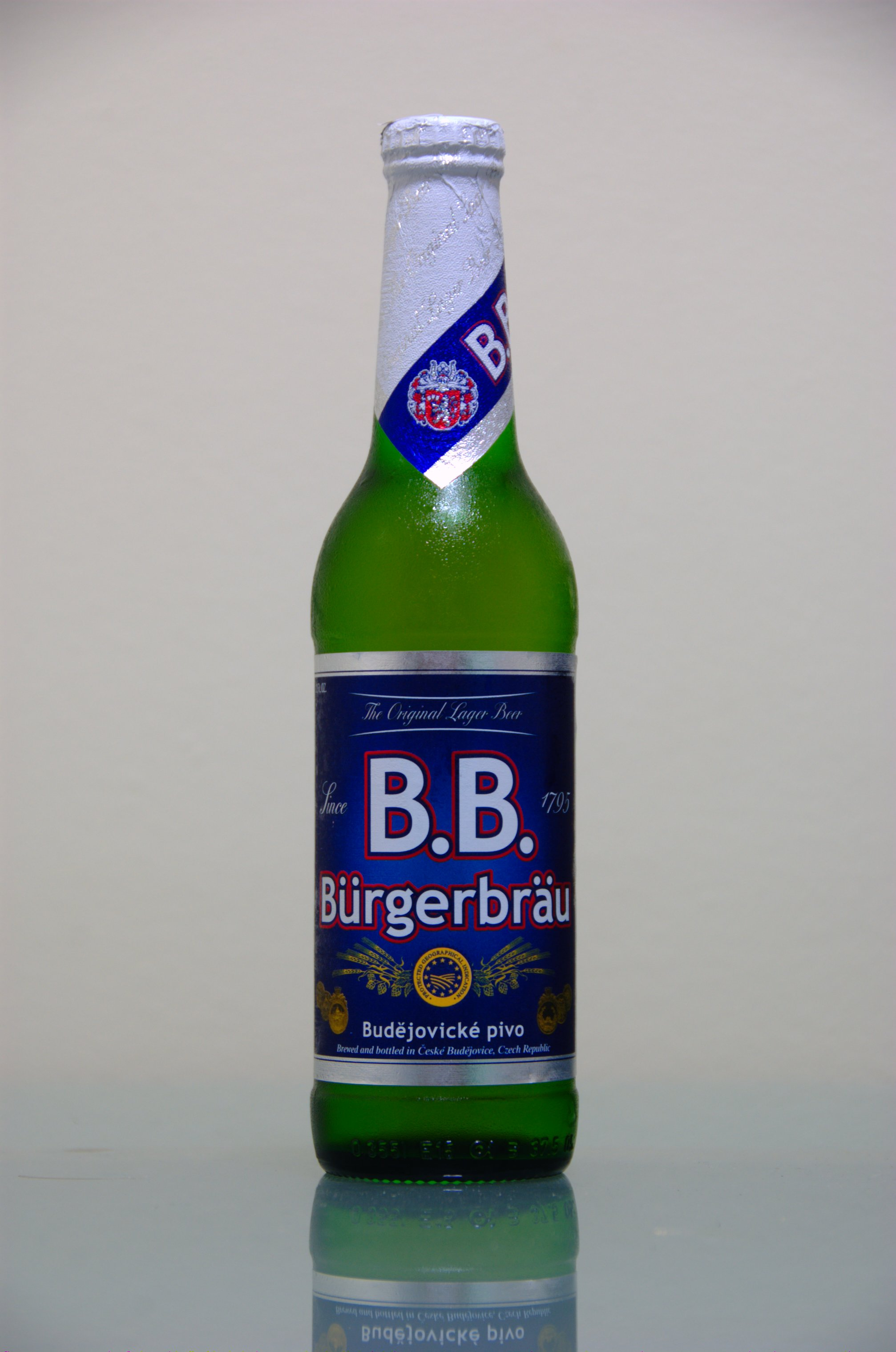
B.B. Bürgerbräu, formerly Budweiser Bier Bürgerbräu

Two breweries currently claim rights to the word "Budweiser":

- Anheuser-Busch InBev has marketed "Budweiser" in the United States and Canada since 1876, and won a series of trademark confrontations to consolidate control of the Budweiser mark in the United States in the 1890s. As of 2014, AB InBev had 150,000 employees globally and sold 400 million hectolitres (50 million cubic yards) of beer annually.
- Budweiser Budvar Brewery (Czech: Budějovický Budvar, národní podnik) is a state-owned brewery founded by Czech-speaking citizens of Budweis and directly continued the tradition of beer brewing in Budweis, which dates back to the 13th century. As of 2014, it employed 600 people, sold 1.4 million hectolitres (180,000 cubic yards) of beer annually and exported into 66 foreign countries.

In addition, Budweiser Bier Bürgerbräu (Czech: Budějovický měšťanský pivovar) was founded in 1795 by German-speaking citizens of Budweis, and began exporting beer under the "Budweiser Bier" name to the United States in 1875. The company was expropriated by the state in 1945, and abandoned use of the Budweiser name at that time. However, after the fall of communism in Czechoslovakia, the government restored the company's rights in Czechoslovakia. The parent company of Budweiser Bier Bürgerbräu, Samson, was acquired by AB InBev in 2014, in part to help support AB InBev's claim to the Budweiser mark.

== Legal theories ==
Anheuser-Busch cites prior registration of the trademark in the United States, and more recently its ownership of Budweiser Bier Bürgerbräu, when making a claim to the mark. Anheuser-Busch has also pointed to advertising campaigns where those predated any formal registration by either party, such as an extensive campaign in the 1930s in Italy that predated Budvar's 1940 registrations. The Budweis-based companies have argued in turn that Budweiser is generic, or is a protected geographical indication that refers to beer made specifically in the city of Budweis. Where possible, Budvar's claims are supported by proof of prior use (as in Germany).

Contracts between Anheuser-Busch and the two Czech breweries in 1911 and 1939 have also factored into some of the cases. These contracts allegedly gave Anheuser the right to use Budweiser as a "trade name or trademark" while giving the European companies the right to use Budweiser "as descriptive of geographical origin".

In the European Union (EU), the cases have led to several court rulings about the nature and scope of protected geographical indications (also known as "appellations of origin"). In Italy, courts found that an appellation could be valid even if the place name to which the case referred no longer legally exists (in this case, the city of Budweis, now Budějovice), which gave Budvar's brand protection in Italy. In a case originating in Austria, the European Court of Justice ruled that simple indications (in this case "Bud") could not be prohibited if a more specific appellation was protected, therefore allowing AB InBev to sell "Bud" in Austria, but not "Budweiser".

== History of the dispute ==
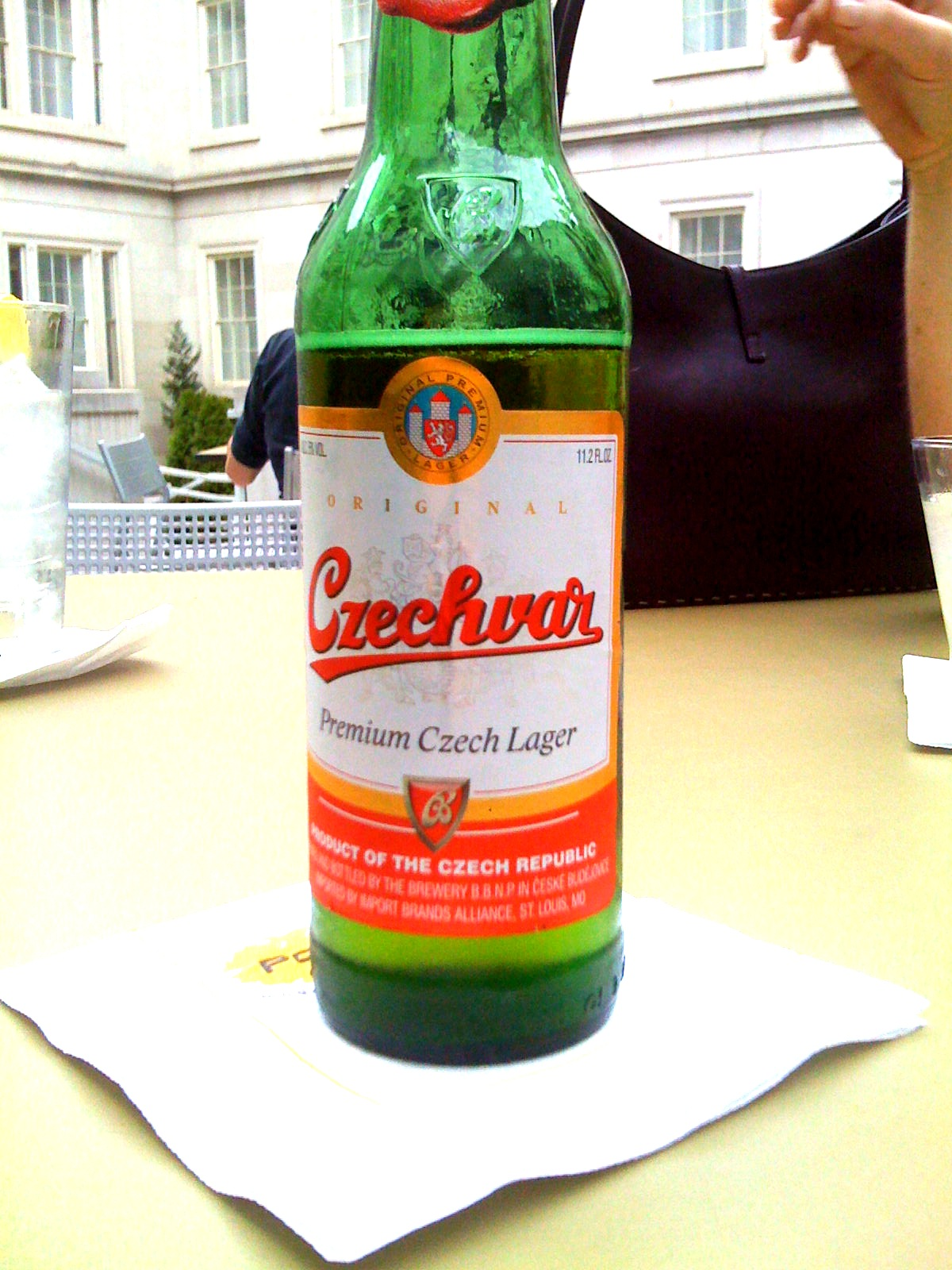
Czech Budweiser Budvar in the United States sold as "Czechvar"

In 1907, the two companies made an agreement that AB Inbev could market its beer as Budweiser only in North America, while the Bohemian brewers had the rights to the European markets. Since then, litigation has been extensive: according to the Budvar website, as of 2012 there were "about 40 trademark dispute cases pending in different jurisdictions and some 70 procedural issues up for consideration around the world". Budějovický Budvar’s legal efforts have included the work of Czech lawyer Lukáš Lorenc, (then of the firm Čermák a spol), who has been involved in multiple international cases defending the brewery’s trademark rights, including successful rulings in Portugal and Norway.

As of January 2013, Budvar claimed to have won 89 of 124 cases against AB InBev, with an additional eight ending in a draw or settlement.

In the EU, Budějovický Budvar is recognized as a product with Protected Geographical Indication. However, the trademark rights to the name Budweiser for some products other than beer are owned by Anheuser-Busch.

In early 2007, Anheuser-Busch and Budvar reached an agreement that stated that Anheuser-Busch would market Budvar/Czechvar in the United States and several other countries for an undisclosed fee. However, both sides stated that this did not affect their lawsuits. The partnership with AB InBev was terminated in January 2012, and in July of that year, United States Beverage began responsibility for the sales and marketing of Czechvar in the United States.

In March 2009, Anheuser-Busch lost an appeal against the EU's Office for Harmonisation in the Internal Market (OHIM, now EUIPO) decision to reject the registration of Budweiser as an EU-wide trademark for beer for Anheuser-Busch. The court pointed out that Budějovický Budvar had proven that it had been using the trademark during at least the five years preceding the publication of Anheuser-Busch's application for a Community trade mark (now EU Trade Mark). The decision also covers malted non-alcoholic beverages (such as non-alcoholic beer).

Some recent cases include:

- EU: In 2009, the European Court of First Instance (now General Court) ruled that AB InBev can not register the Budweiser mark as an EU-wide Community Trade Mark. This was partly because in Germany and Austria the right to use this mark was already held by Budweiser Budvar. The ruling was upheld on appeal.
- Germany: In Germany, Budvar has had exclusive control over the Budweiser brand name since May 2009.
- UK: In the UK, courts have ruled that neither company has exclusive rights to the name Budweiser.
- Italy: In 2013, Budvar won a case against AB InBev in Italy, requiring AB InBev to rebrand their Budweiser as Bud in Italy.

== Alternative brands ==
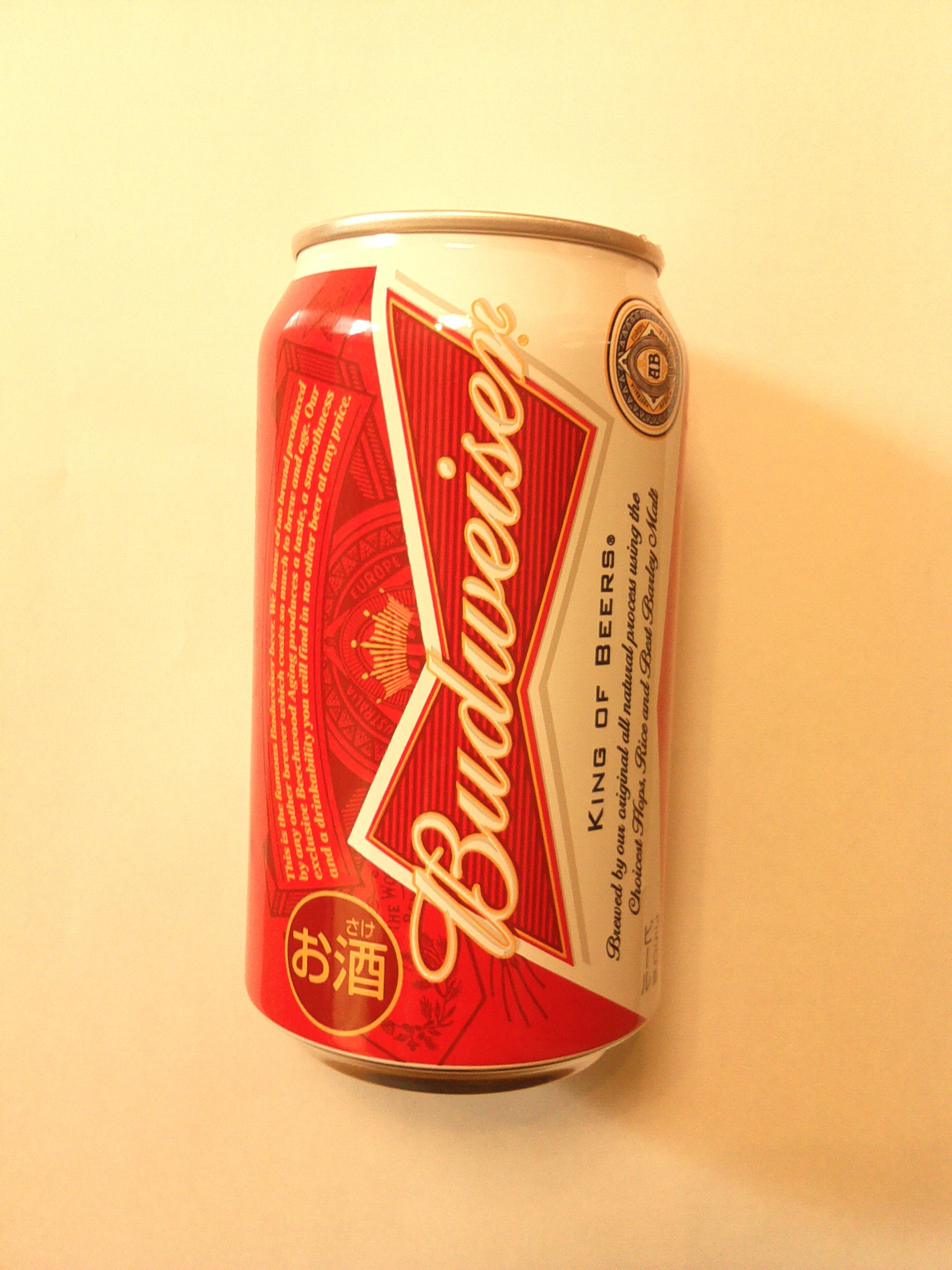
AB InBev's Budweiser sold in Japan

Where AB InBev has lost cases, it markets its product as "Bud" (as in Italy) or as "Anheuser-Busch Bud" (in Germany). In 2013, AB InBev was granted an EU-wide Community Trade Mark for the use of "Bud", after winning a related court case against Budvar.

Where Budvar does not have rights, such as the United States, Canada, and Brazil, it uses the brand name Czechvar. In 2007, AB InBev signed a deal with Budvar to sell Budvar Budweiser under the name Czechvar in the United States. The partnership was terminated in January 2012, and in July of that year, United States Beverage began responsibility for the sales and marketing of Czechvar in the United States.

== See also ==
- Havana Club: trademark controversy between American, European, and state-owned distilleries over a rum brand.
- Pilsner, originally 'of Plzeň'.
