= Budweiser =

Brand of beer produced by Anheuser-Busch

- Type: American lager
- Manufacturer: Anheuser–Busch
- Origin: United States
- Introduced: 1876; 150 years ago St. Louis, Missouri, U.S.
- Alcohol by volume: 5%, U.S., Netherlands, Thailand, India, Canada, Colombia, Japan; 4.5% U.K., Australia; 4.3% Ireland; 3.6% China
- Website: budweiser.com

Budweiser (/ˈbʌdwaɪzər/, German pronunciation: [ˈbu:tvaɪzɐ]) is an American-style pale lager, a brand of Belgian company AB InBev. Introduced in 1876 by Carl Conrad & Co. of St. Louis, Missouri, Budweiser is one of the largest selling beers in the United States. Budweiser is a filtered beer, available on draft and in bottles and cans, made with up to 30% rice in addition to hops and barley malt.

There is an ongoing series of trademark disputes between Anheuser-Busch and the Czech company Budweiser Budvar Brewery over the use of the name. Usually, either Anheuser-Busch or Budweiser Budvar is granted the exclusive use of the Budweiser name in a given market. The Anheuser-Busch lager is available in over 80 countries, but is marketed as "Bud" in areas where Budvar has use of the Budweiser name.

== Name origin and dispute ==
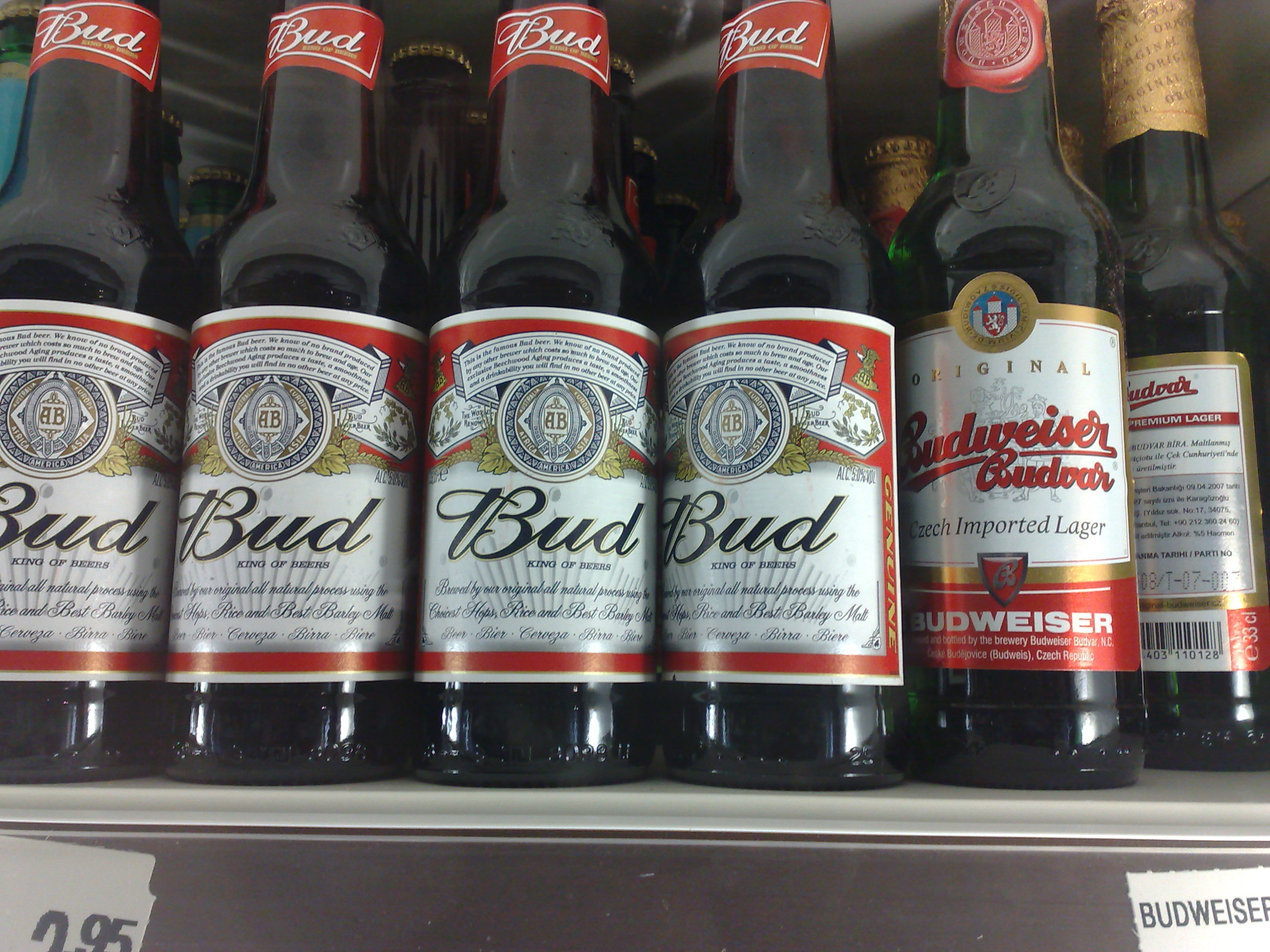
American Budweiser is sold in most of the European Union as "Bud" (left). At right is a bottle of Czech Budweiser.

The name Budweiser is a German derivative adjective, meaning "of Budweis". Beer has been brewed in Budweis, Bohemia (now České Budějovice, Czech Republic) since it was founded in 1265. In 1876, Adolphus Busch and his friend Carl Conrad developed a "Bohemian-style" lager in the United States, inspired after experiencing the original Budweiser on a trip to Bohemia, and produced it in their brewery in St. Louis, Missouri.

Anheuser–Busch has been involved in multiple trademark disputes with the Budweiser Budvar Brewery of České Budějovice over the trademark rights to the name "Budweiser".

In the European Union, except Ireland, Sweden, Finland and Spain, the American beer may only be marketed as Bud, as the Budweiser trademark name is owned solely by the Czech beer maker Budweiser Budvar. In some countries, such as the United Kingdom, both the Budvar and Anheuser–Busch lagers are available under the Budweiser name, though their logos differ.

== Marketing ==
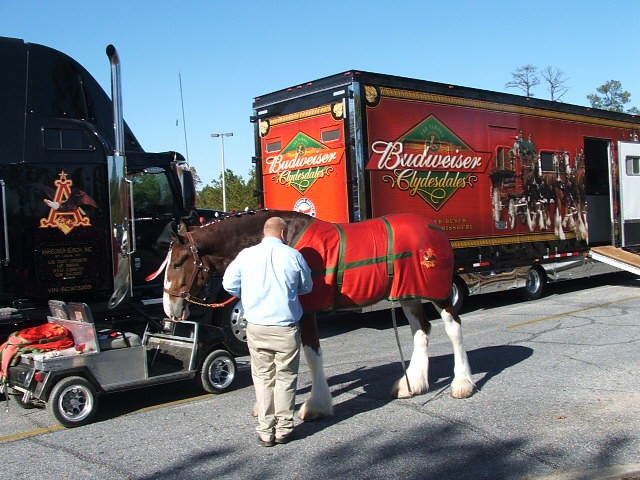
One of the Budweiser Clydesdales

The Budweiser from Budějovice has been called "The Beer of Kings" since the 16th century. Adolphus Busch adapted this slogan to "The King of Beers". This history notwithstanding, Anheuser Busch owns the trademark to these slogans in the United States.

In 1969 AB introduced the Superman-esque advertising character of Bud Man. Bud Man served as one of the inspiration behind several characters including The Simpsons' Duffman.

From 1987 to 1989, Bud Light ran an advertising campaign centered around canine mascot Spuds MacKenzie.

In 2010, the Bud Light brand paid $1 billion for a six-year licensing agreement with the NFL. Budweiser pays $20 million annually for MLB licensing rights.

Budweiser has produced a number of TV advertisements, such as the Budweiser Frogs, lizards impersonating the Budweiser frogs, a campaign built around the phrase "Whassup?", and a team of Clydesdale horses commonly known as the Budweiser Clydesdales.

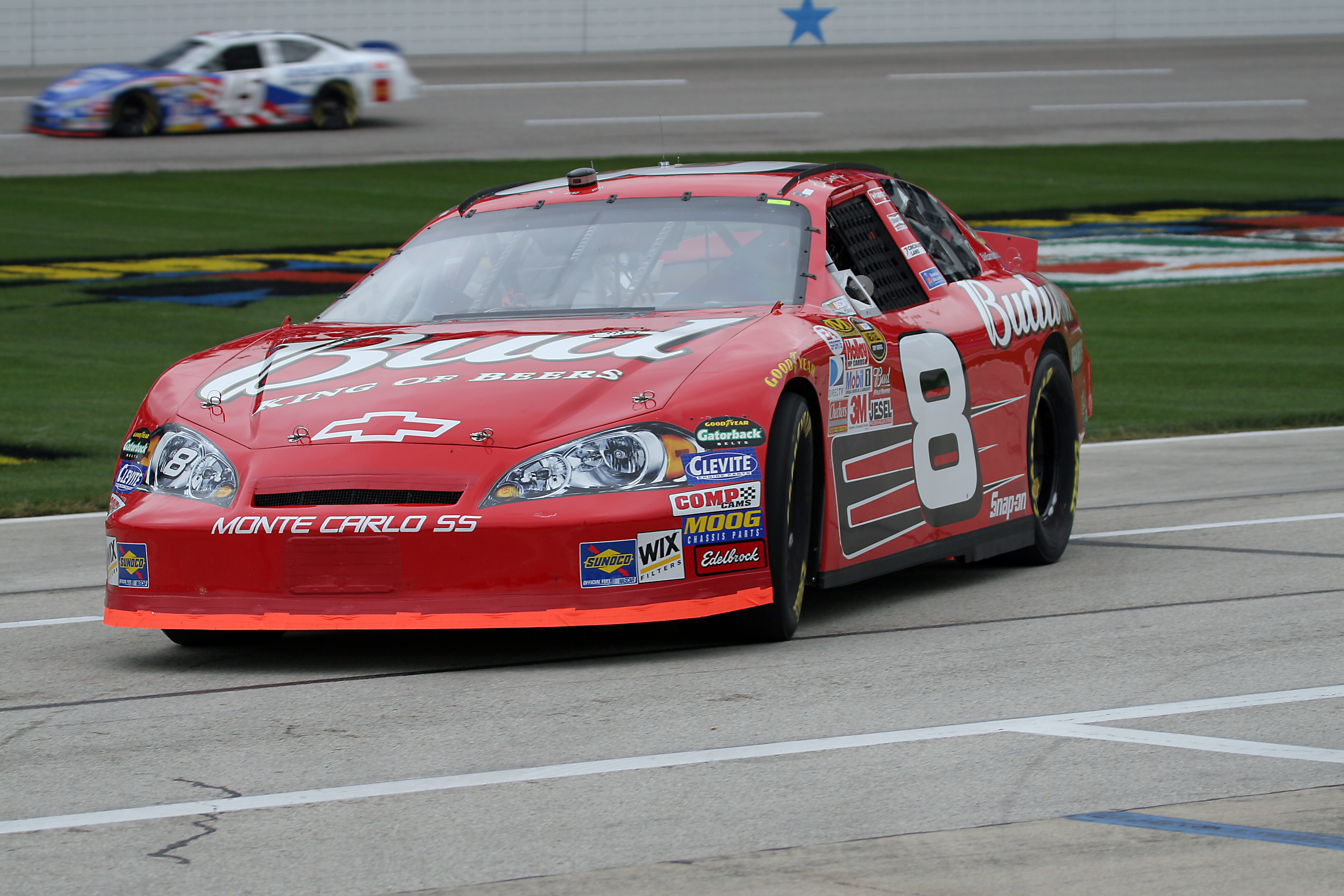
Dale Earnhardt Jr.'s No. 8 Budweiser-sponsored car in 2007

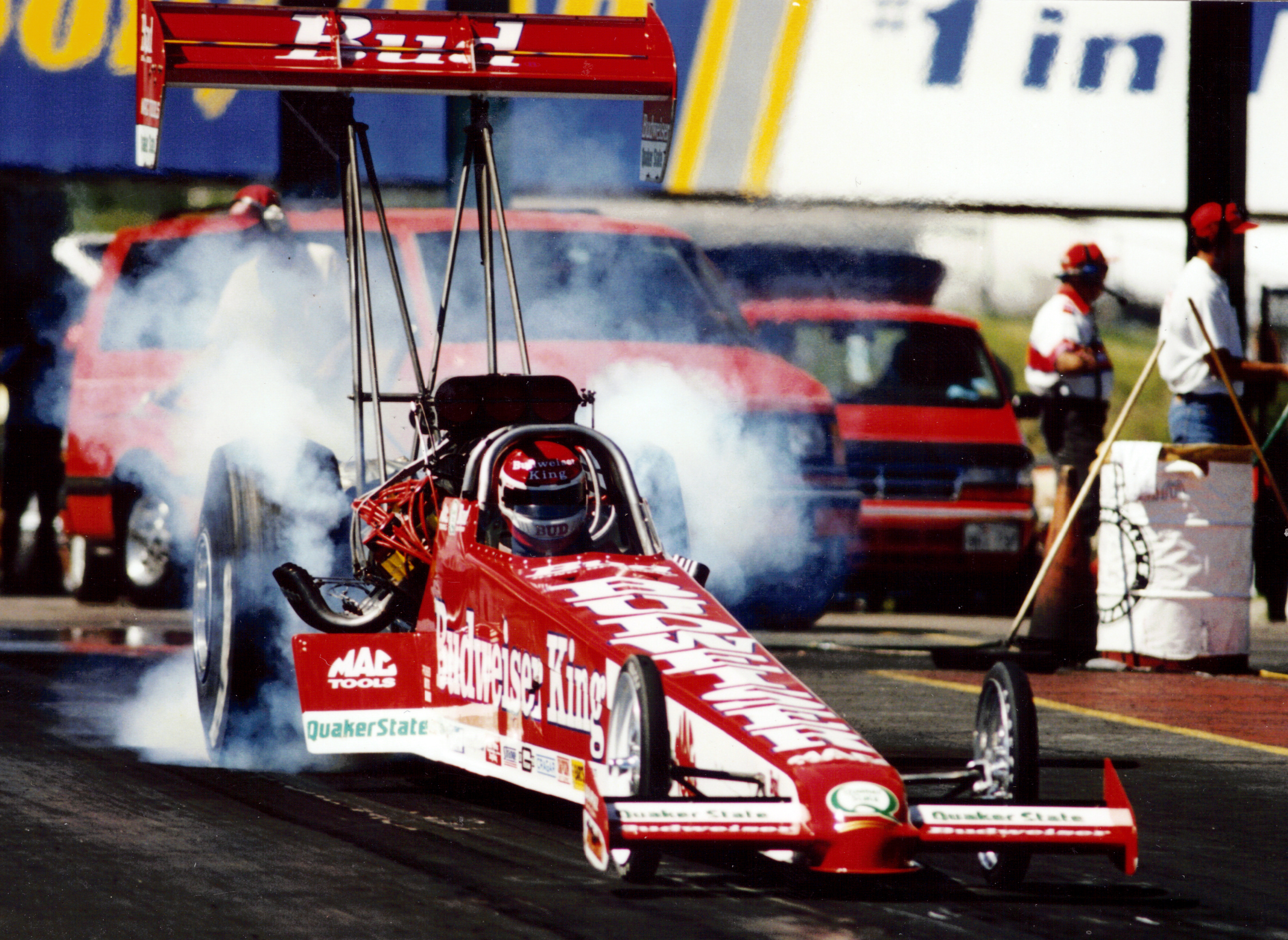
Budweiser-sponsored Top Fuel dragster of Kenny Bernstein in 1993

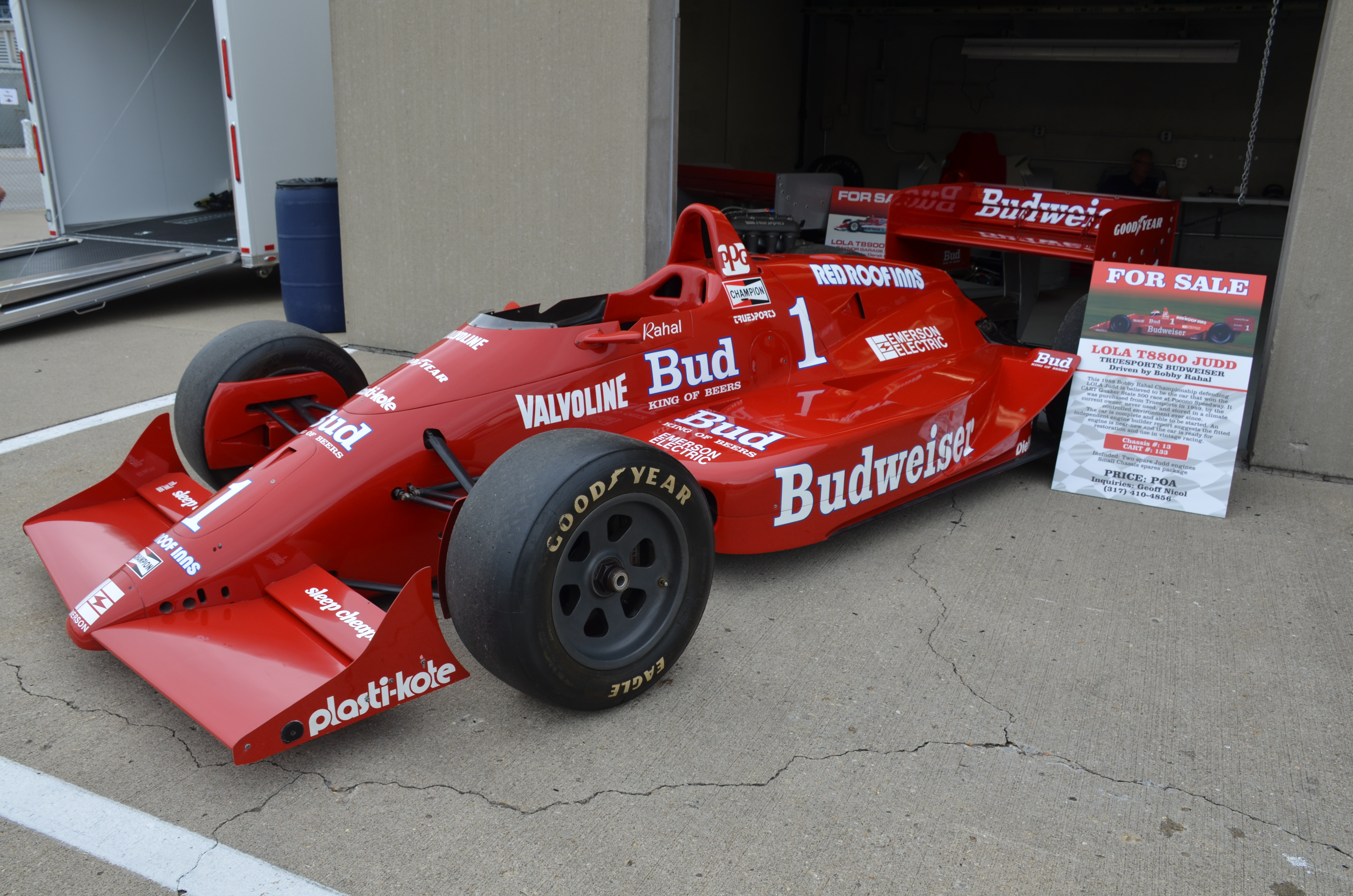
#1 Budweiser Indy Car of Bobby Rahal in 1988

Budweiser also advertises in motorsports, from Bernie Little's Miss Budweiser hydroplane boat to sponsorship of the Budweiser King Top Fuel and Funny Car drivers Kenny Bernstein and Brandon Bernstein. Anheuser-Busch has sponsored the CART championship. It was is the "Official Beer of NHRA" from the 1980s to 2009 and the "Official Beer of NASCAR" from 1998 to 2007. It has sponsored motorsport events such as the Daytona Speedweeks, Budweiser Shootout, Budweiser Duel, Budweiser Pole Award, Budweiser 500, Budweiser 400, Budweiser 300, Budweiser 250, Budweiser 200, and Carolina Pride / Budweiser 200. Starting in 2016, the focus of A-B's NASCAR sponsorship became its Busch brand.

Budweiser has sponsored NASCAR teams such as Junior Johnson, Hendrick Motorsports, DEI, and Stewart–Haas Racing. Sponsored drivers include Dale Earnhardt Jr. (1999–2007), Kasey Kahne (2008–2010), and Kevin Harvick (2011–2015). In IndyCar, Budweiser sponsored Mario Andretti (1983–1984), Bobby Rahal (1985–1988), Scott Pruett (1989–1992), Roberto Guerrero (1993), Scott Goodyear (1994), Paul Tracy (1995), Christian Fittipaldi (1996–1997), and Richie Hearn (1998–1999).

Between 2003 and 2006, Budweiser was a sponsor of the BMW Williams Formula One team.

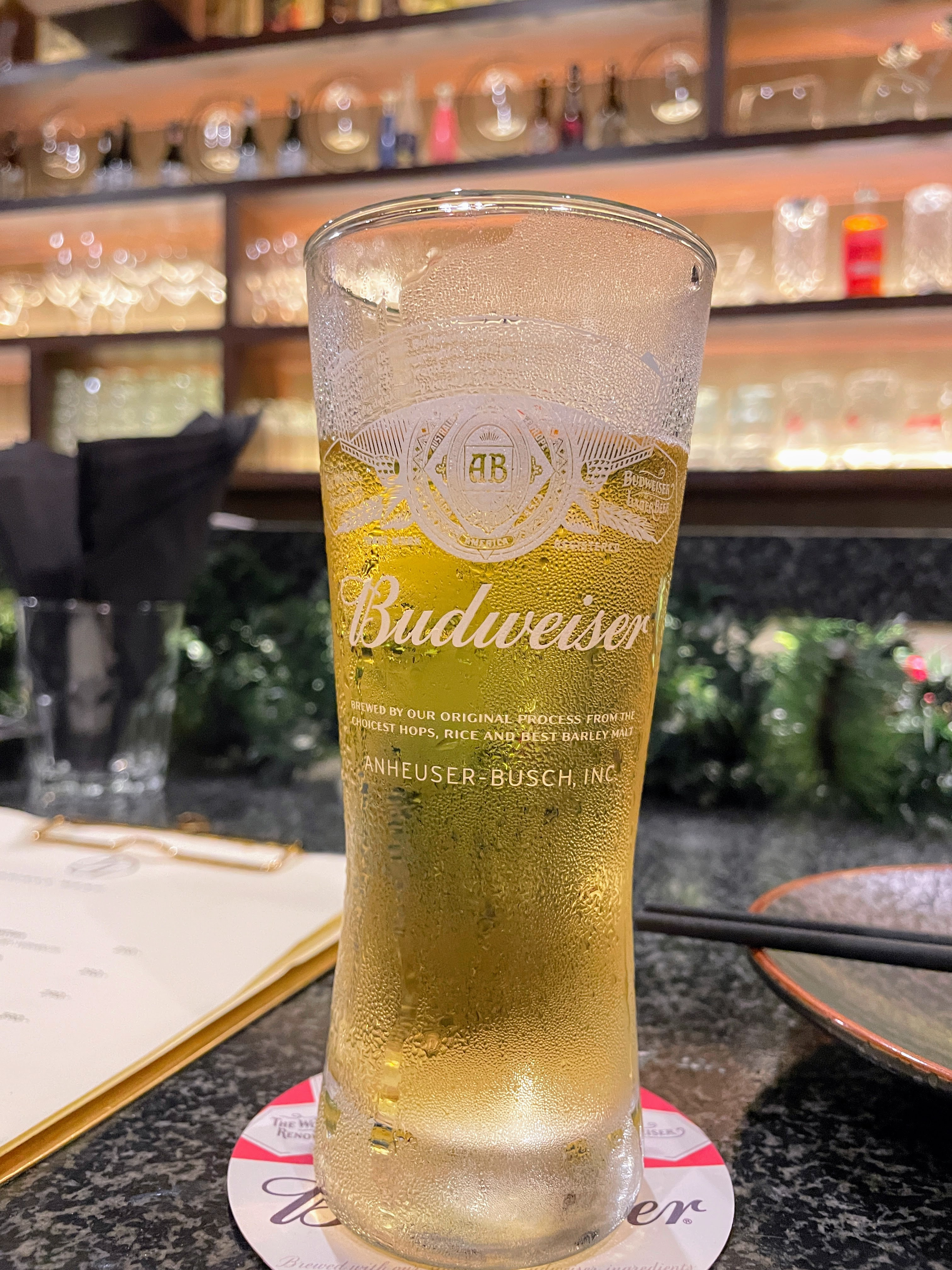
Budweiser beer in a Bangkok bar

Anheuser-Busch has placed Budweiser as an official partner and sponsor of Major League Soccer and Los Angeles Galaxy and was the headline sponsor of the British Basketball League in the 1990s. Anheuser-Busch has also placed Budweiser as an official sponsor of the Premier League and the presenting sponsor of the FA Cup.

In the early 20th century, the company commissioned a play-on-words song called "Under the Anheuser Bush", which was recorded by several early phonograph companies.

In 2009, Anheuser-Busch partnered with popular Chinese video-sharing site Tudou.com for a user-generated online video contest. The contest encouraged users to submit ideas that included ants for a Bud TV spot set to run in February 2010 during Chinese New Year.

In 2010, Budweiser produced an online reality TV series centered around the 2010 FIFA World Cup in South Africa called Bud House, following the lives of 32 international soccer fans (one representing each nation in the World Cup) living together in a house in South Africa.

Anheuser-Busch advertises the Budweiser brand heavily, expending $449 million in 2012 in the United States alone. Presenting Budweiser as the most advertised drink brand in America, and accounted for a third of the company's US marketing budget.

On November 5, 2012, Anheuser-Busch asked Paramount Pictures to obscure or remove the Budweiser logo from the film Flight (2012), directed by Robert Zemeckis and starring Denzel Washington.

In an advertisement titled "Brewed the Hard Way" which aired during Super Bowl XLIX, Budweiser touted itself as "Proudly A Macro Beer", distinguishing it from smaller production craft beers.

In 2016, Beer Park by Budweiser opened on the Las Vegas Strip.

On October 7, 2016, the Budweiser Clydesdales made a special appearance on the Danforth Campus at Washington University in St. Louis ahead of the presidential debate. A special batch beer named Lilly's Lager was exclusively brewed for the occasion.

In December 2020, Budweiser sent personalized bottles of beer to every goalkeeper against whom Lionel Messi had scored.

== Containers and packaging ==
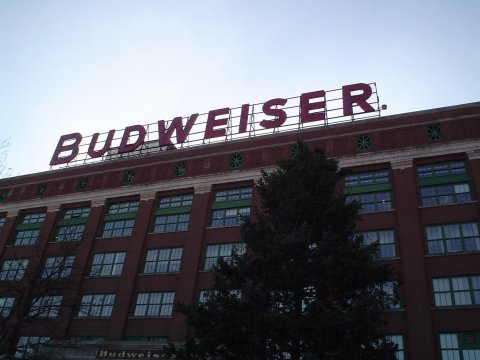
The packaging plant at the Anheuser-Busch headquarters in St. Louis, Missouri

=== Containers ===
Budweiser has been distributed in many sizes and variety of containers. Until the early 1950s, Budweiser was primarily distributed in three packages: kegs, 12 U.S. fl oz (355 mL) bottles and 1 US quart (0.95 L) bottles. Cans were first introduced in 1936. In 1955 August Busch Jr. made a strategic move to expand Budweiser's national brand and distributor presence. Along with this expansion came advances in bottling automation, bottling materials and distribution methods. These advances brought new containers and package designs. As of 2011 Budweiser is distributed in four large container volumes: half-barrel kegs (15.5 US gal; 58.7 L), quarter-barrel kegs (7.75 US gal; 29.3 L), 1/6-barrel kegs (5.17 US gal; 19.6 L) and 5.2 US gallons (20 L) "beer balls". Budweiser produces a variety of cans and bottles ranging from 7–40 US fluid ounces (210–1,180 ml). On August 3, 2011, Anheuser-Busch announced its twelfth can design since 1936, one which emphasizes the bowtie.

Packages are sometimes tailored to local customs and traditions. In St. Mary's County, Maryland, 10 US fl oz (300 ml) fluid ounce cans are the preferred package.

=== Cans ===
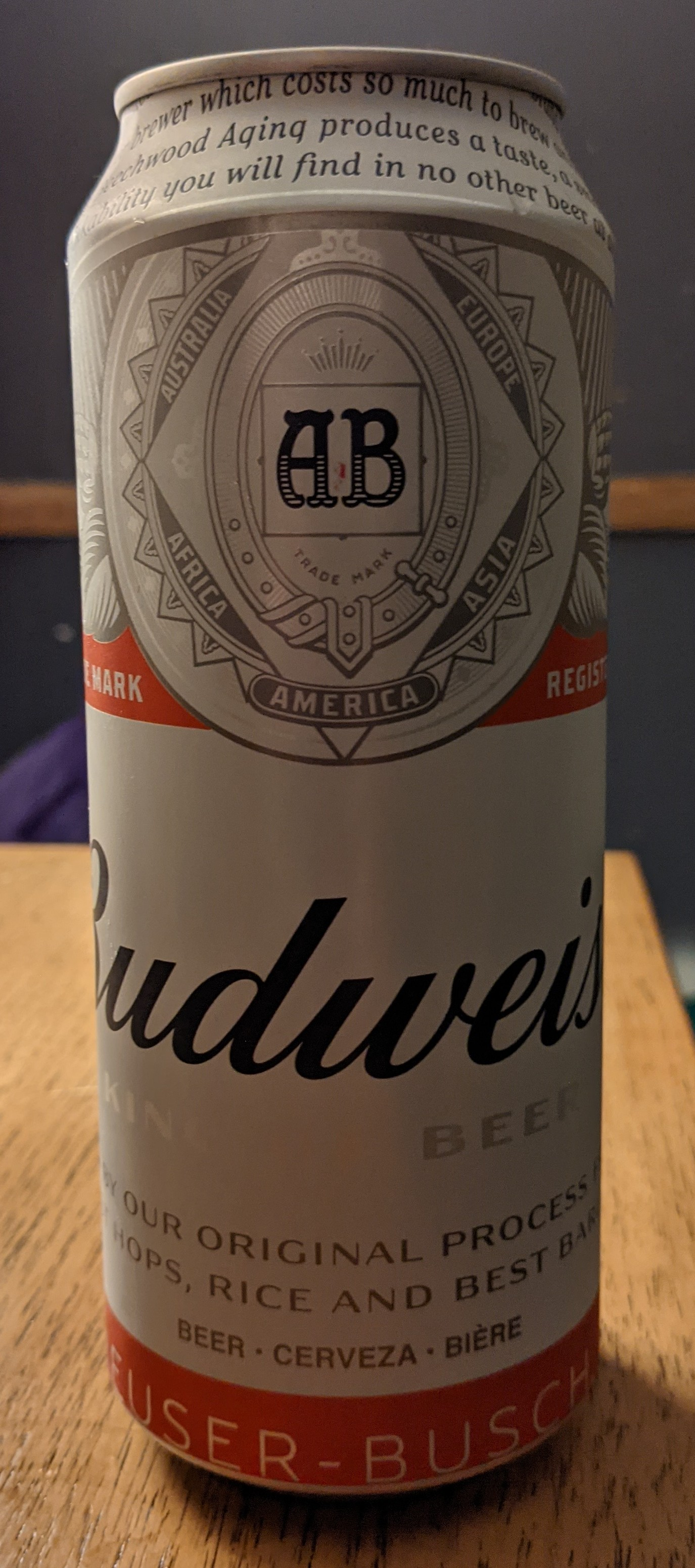
Budweiser 500 mL (17 US fl oz) can with an alcohol content of 5% ABV

In an attempt to re-stimulate interest in their beer after the repeal of Prohibition, Budweiser began canning their beer in 1936. This new packaging led to an increase in sales which lasted until the start of World War II in 1939.

Over the years, Budweiser cans have undergone various design changes in response to market conditions and consumer tastes. Since 1936, 12 major can design changes have occurred, not including the temporary special edition designs.

Budweiser cans have traditionally displayed patriotic American symbols, such as eagles and the colors red, white, and blue. In 2011, there was a branding redesign that eliminated some of the traditional imagery. The new design was largely in response to a large decline in sales threatening Budweiser's status as America's best-selling beer. In order to regain the domestic market share that Budweiser had lost, the company tried to update its appearance by giving the can a more contemporary look. The company hoped that the new design will offset the effects that unemployment had on its sales. Although the more modern design was intended for young male Americans, the new design was also part of an attempt to focus on the international market. Budweiser began selling its beer in Russia in 2010, and is currently expanding its operations in China.

== The beer ==
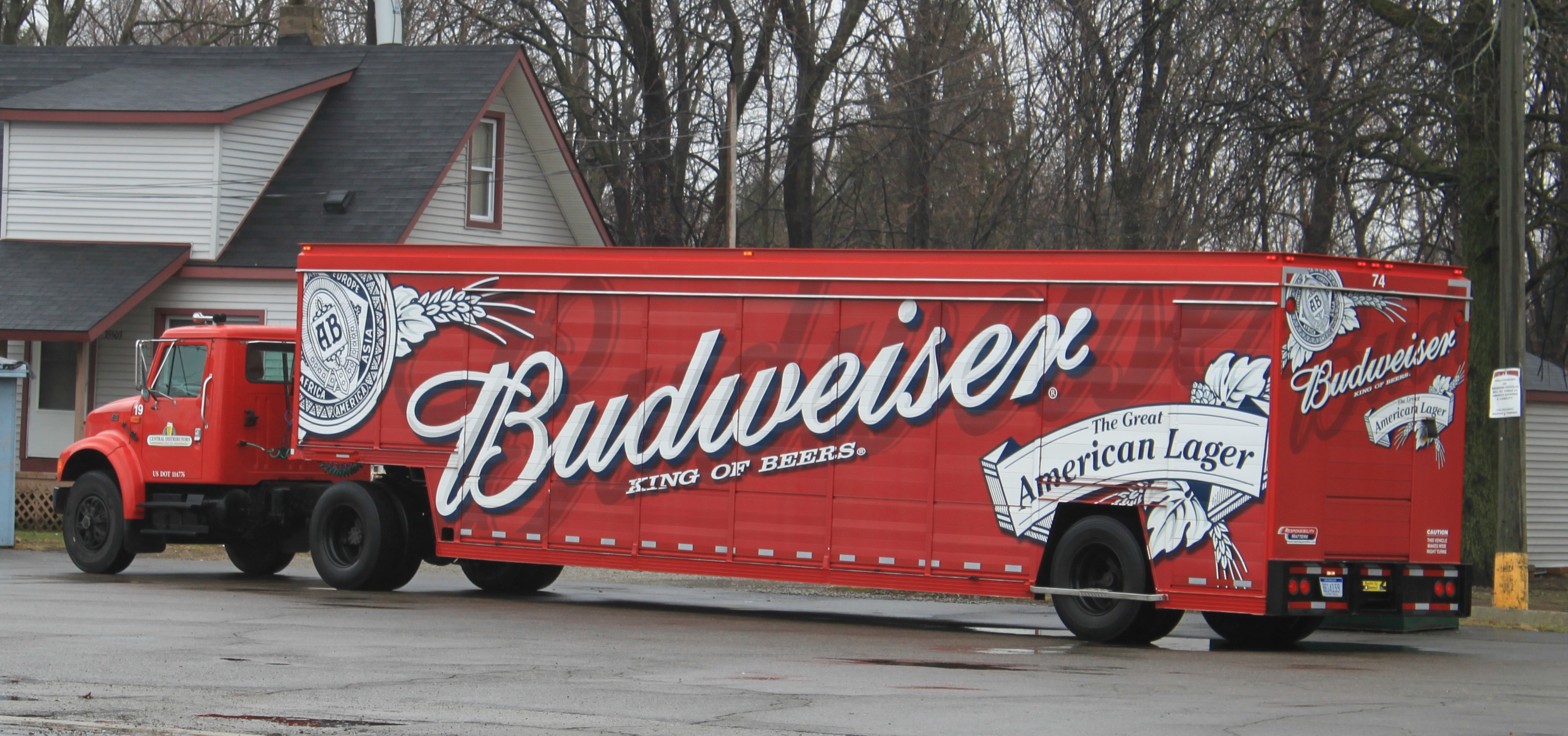
Budweiser delivery truck, Romulus, Michigan

Budweiser is produced using malted barley, rice, water, hops and yeast. The brewing happens in seven steps: milling, mashing, straining, brew kettle, primary fermentation, beechwood lagering and finishing. It is lagered with beechwood chips in the aging vessel. Because the beechwood chips are boiled in sodium bicarbonate (baking soda) for seven hours beforehand, there is little to no flavor contribution from the wood.

The maturation tanks that Anheuser-Busch uses are horizontal, causing flocculation of yeast to occur much more quickly. Anheuser-Busch refers to this process as a secondary fermentation, with the idea being that the chips give the yeast more surface area to rest on. This is combined with a krausening procedure that re-introduces wort into the chip tank, reactivating the fermentation process.

Placing beechwood chips at the bottom of the tank keeps the yeast in suspension longer, giving it more time to reabsorb and process green beer flavors such as acetaldehyde and diacetyl that Anheuser-Busch believes are off-flavors which detract from overall drinkability.

Budweiser and Bud Light are sometimes advertised as vegan beers, in that their ingredients and conditioning do not use animal by-products. Some people object to the inclusion of genetically engineered rice and animal products used in the brewing process. In July 2006, Anheuser-Busch brewed a version of Budweiser with organic rice for sale in Mexico. It has yet to extend this practice to any other countries.

== Budweiser brands ==
In addition to the regular Budweiser, Anheuser-Busch brews several different beers under the Budweiser brand, including Bud Light, Bud Ice, and Bud Light Lime.

In July 2010, Anheuser-Busch launched Budweiser 66 in the United Kingdom. Budweiser Brew No.66 has 4% alcohol by volume, and is brewed and distributed in the UK by Inbev UK Limited.

In 2020, Budweiser introduced Bud Light Seltzer. In August 2020, Bud Light Seltzers added grapefruit, cranberry and pineapple flavors, to its original offerings of black cherry, mango, lemon lime and strawberry. In October 2020, Bud Light Seltzers added Apple Crisp, Peppermint Pattie, and Gingersnap, with the cans sporting "ugly sweater" designs.

In July 2020, Budweiser introduced Bud Zero, its first alcohol-free low-calorie beer. It has zero sugar, zero alcohol, and 50 kilocalories (210 kilojoules) of food energy.

== Temporary "America" labeling ==
On May 10, 2016, Advertising Age reported that the Alcohol and Tobacco Tax and Trade Bureau had approved new Budweiser labels to be used on 12 US fl oz (350 mL) cans and bottles from May 23 until the November elections. The name "Budweiser" was changed to "America". Much of the text on the packaging was replaced with patriotic American slogans, such as E pluribus unum and "Liberty & Justice For All".

== International production ==
Budweiser is licensed, produced and distributed in Canada by Labatt Brewing Company (also owned by AB InBev). Of the 15 Anheuser-Busch breweries outside of the United States, 14 of them are positioned in China. Budweiser is the fourth-leading brand in the Chinese beer market.

== See also ==
- Beer Wars (2009), documentary film about the American beer industry
- Ulterior Emotions (2002) – an album released by Anheuser Busch as part of their "Bud Light Institute" campaign
