= Ulterior Emotions =

Studio album by The Bud Light Institute
- Released: 2002
- Recorded: Lonesome Pine Studios, Inc. 2002
- Genre: Comedy
- Length: 17:29 (excluding non-musical content)
- Producer: Tom Eymundson, Johnny Chambers

Ulterior Emotions is an album of music released in 2002 by Budweiser as part of their "Bud Light Institute" advertising campaign. The album was available for purchase on their website. Also, for a time, you could download the song "You're Beautiful (Can I Go Up North This Weekend?)" on their website for free. Lyrics were included with the album.

== Track listing ==
1. Our Relationship Is Getting Stronger with Every Golf Game That I Play [Goldenball Philharmonic] – 2:54
2. You Didn't Have to (Get Me That Beer) [The McCroritones] – 2:12
3. You're Beautiful (Can I Go Up North This Weekend?) [Bink-O-Rama] – 3:38
4. It Takes a Special Kind of Woman to Make Sandwiches for the Guys [Chasichaziwitz 5] – 3:07
5. I Love You Dearly Because You Let Me Go Out with My Friends on a Weekly Basis [Chambermania] – 2:46
6. You Said It Was OK (I Should Have Known It Wasn't) [Johnny Verdon Quintet] – 2:41

In addition to the musical tracks listed above, the album contained 21 tracks of "inspirational thoughts" from the Bud Light Institute.
