= Budweiser Budvar Brewery =

Czech beer brewery

Coordinates: 48.9935766°N 14.4761973°E

Budějovický Budvar, národní podnik
- Trade name: Budweiser Budvar Brewery
- Formerly: Czech Joint-Stock Brewery (1895–1930); Budvar-Czech Joint-Stock Brewery České Budějovice (1930–1967)
- Type: State-owned enterprise
- Industry: Alcoholic beverages and brewing
- Founded: 1895; 131 years ago
- Headquarters: Karolíny Světlé 512/4, České Budějovice, Czech Republic
- Key people: Petr Dvořák (CEO); Adam Brož (brewmaster)
- Products: Lager varieties, such as pale lager, dunkel and eisbock
- Production output: ▲1,946 million hL of beer (2025)
- Revenue: ▲CZK 2,470 million (2015)
- Operating income: ▲CZK 349.8 million (2015)
- Net income: 254,927,000 Czech koruna (2017)
- Total assets: 5,327,842,000 Czech koruna (2017)
- Owner: Czech Government
- Number of employees: 653 (2015)
- Website: www.budejovickybudvar.cz

Budweiser Budvar (Czech: Budějovický Budvar [ˈbuɟɛjovɪtskiː ˈbudvar]) is a brewery in the Czech city of České Budějovice (German: Budweis), best known for its original Budweiser or Budweiser Budvar pale lager brewed using artesian water, Moravian barley and Saaz hops. Budweiser Budvar is the fourth largest beer producer in the Czech Republic and the second largest exporter of beer abroad.

The state-owned brewery and its Budweiser pale lager have been engaged in a trademark dispute with Anheuser-Busch over the right to market and sell the beer under the name Budweiser since the start of the 20th century, and consequently is imported as Czechvar in some countries. The brewery is incorporated as Budějovický Budvar, národní podnik ("Budweiser Budvar, national enterprise").

== History ==
=== 1265–1895 ===
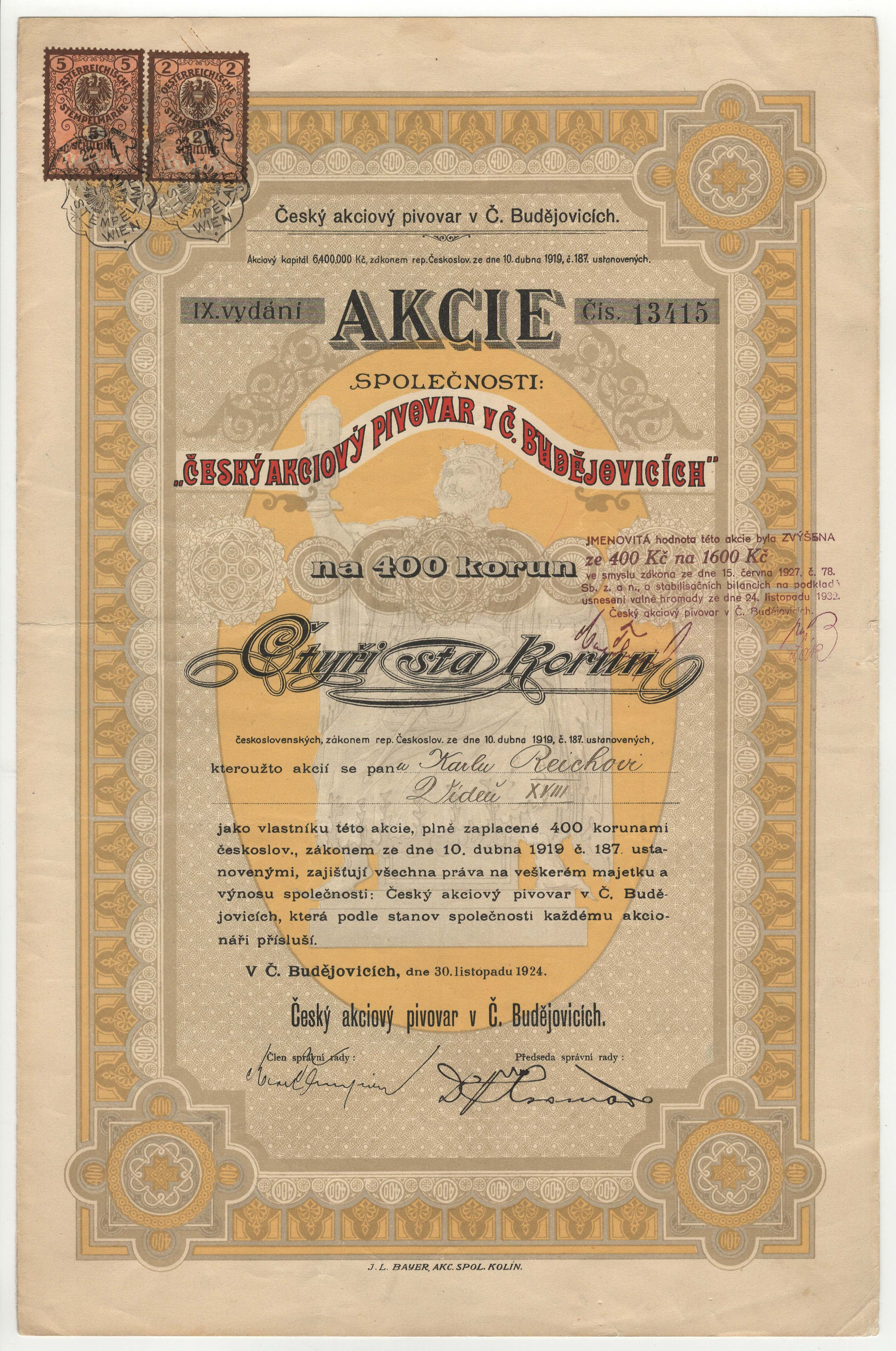
Share of the Český akciový pivovar in Budvar, issued 30. November 1924

Former brewery logo

The history of brewing in České Budějovice (German: Budweis) dates back to 1265, when Ottokar II, King of Bohemia, granted the city brewing rights. At one point, the city was the imperial brewery of the Holy Roman Empire. To promote the quality of the drink, nearby towns were forbidden from brewing. To distinguish Budweis beer from that coming from other regions, it was called Budweiser Bier ("beer from Budweis" in German). By the early 16th century, the Czech brewing industry was providing up to 87% of the total revenue for municipalities. The Thirty Years' War between 1618 and 1648, however, devastated much of Central Europe and with it, the Czech beer industry. Concurrently, the Kingdom of Bohemia became a part of the Habsburg monarchy after the war.

A separate brewery, Budweiser Bürgerbräu (Czech: Budějovický měšťanský pivovar) was founded in 1795 by the city's German-speaking citizens and started brewing Budweiser Bier in 1802. The company began shipping its beer to the United States in 1875. A year later, Adolphus Busch, a German immigrant to the United States and a businessman, encountered the brewery's Budweiser often during his visit to Europe. Thus, he decided to name his own beer Budweiser and brew it according to the Bohemian process. Budweiser Bürgerbräu was acquired by Anheuser-Busch InBev in 2014 to aid its claim on the Budweiser trademark.

=== 1895–present ===
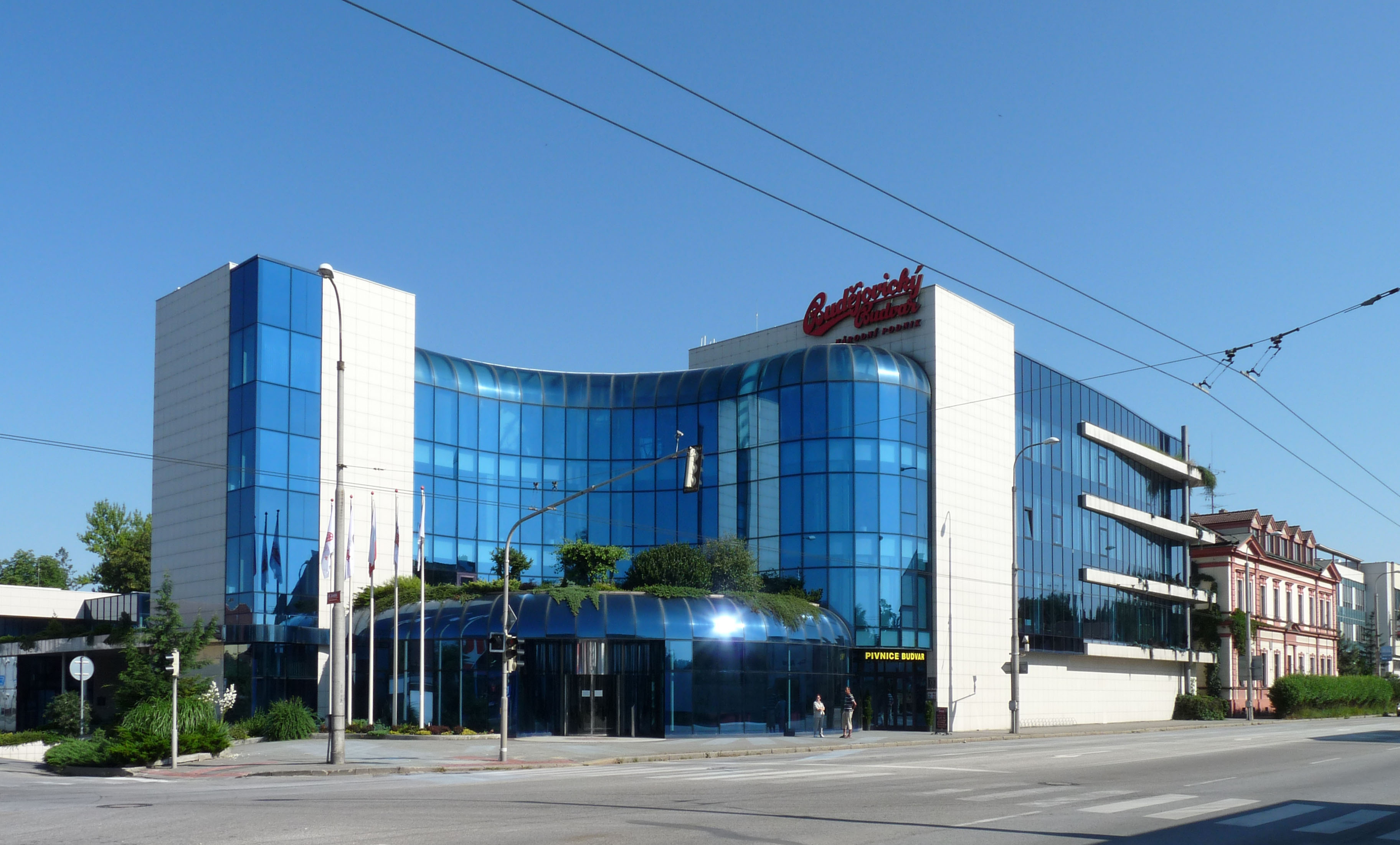
Budweiser Budvar's headquarters and brewery in the Kněžské Dvory suburb of České Budějovice, pictured in 2011

Budweiser Budvar Brewery was incorporated in 1895 as the Czech Joint Stock Brewery when local Czech breweries in České Budějovice, then part of Austria-Hungary, merged and started brewing Budweiser with new technology. The name Budvar is a portmanteau of Budějovice Pivovar 'Budweis Brewery'. With the German occupation of Czechoslovakia during World War II and its communist-rule during the Cold War, the brewery was unable to compete with the American Anheuser-Busch as production faltered. By 1948, all Czech breweries had been nationalized by the communist government.

The brewery reported in 2015 that it had grown by 226% since 1991 and that its total sales volume had increased by 39% in the last ten years.

== Budweiser Budvar ==
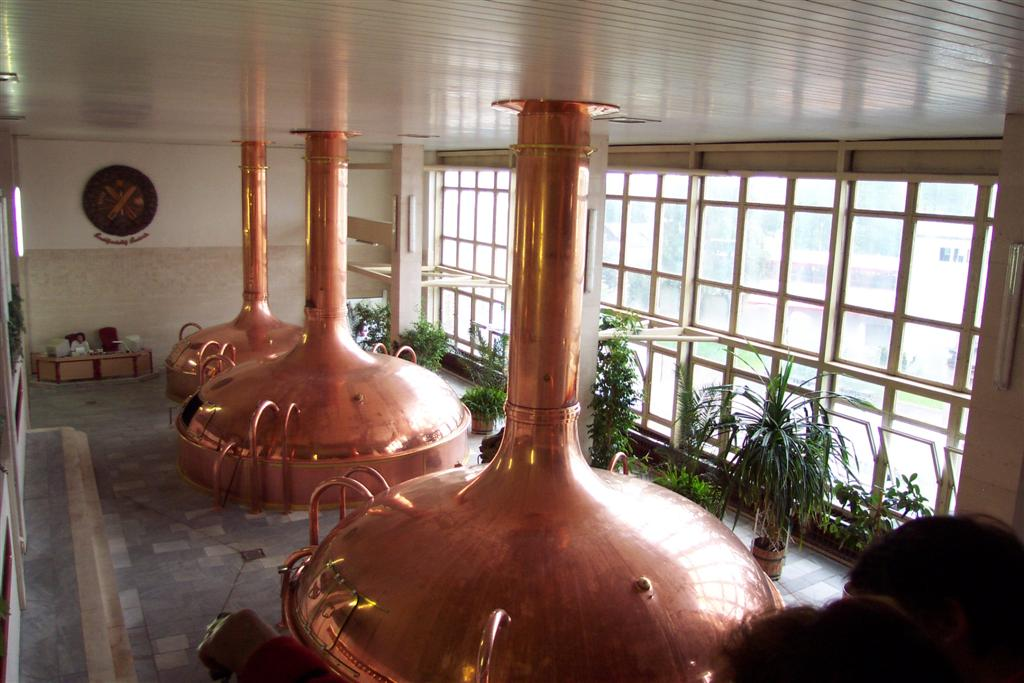
Historical beer vats inside the brewery in České Budějovice, pictured in 2004

=== Production ===
Budweiser Budvar beer is produced in the brewery at České Budějovice, drawing artesian water from wells beneath it, with Moravian barley and Saaz hops, known as a noble hop variety, from the Žatec region. It is matured for a minimum of 90 days, contrasted with 72 hours of lagering (maturation) for mass-market beers. In 2004, the European Union awarded Budweiser Budvar Protected Geographical Indication status. Budweiser is the brewery's "signature product" and a "symbol of national pride". The drinks reviewer Michael Jackson said the following of the company's lager in 2002:

Budweiser Budvar is a great beer because it has great raw materials and great brewers. They produce it in a slow and painstaking way. Its integrity is best served by its being produced in its town of origin, in a region with pride in its beer.

In 1990, the company brewed 450,000 hectolitres (59,000 cu. yd.) of beer a year and exported to 18 countries; in 2013, 1.42 million hectolitres (185,000 cu. yd.) and 66 countries; and in 2015, 1.6 million hectolitres (210,000 cu. yd.) and 76 countries, respectively. Budvar has brewed the most beer to date in 2025, for a total of nearly two million hectoliters—1.946 million hectoliters, to be exact. This represents a 1% increase over 2024, which was also a record year. It is the most bought foreign beer in Germany, selling approximately 290,000 hectolitres (38,000 cu. yd.) in 2016, and the best selling Czech beer in the United Kingdom.

=== Trademark dispute ===
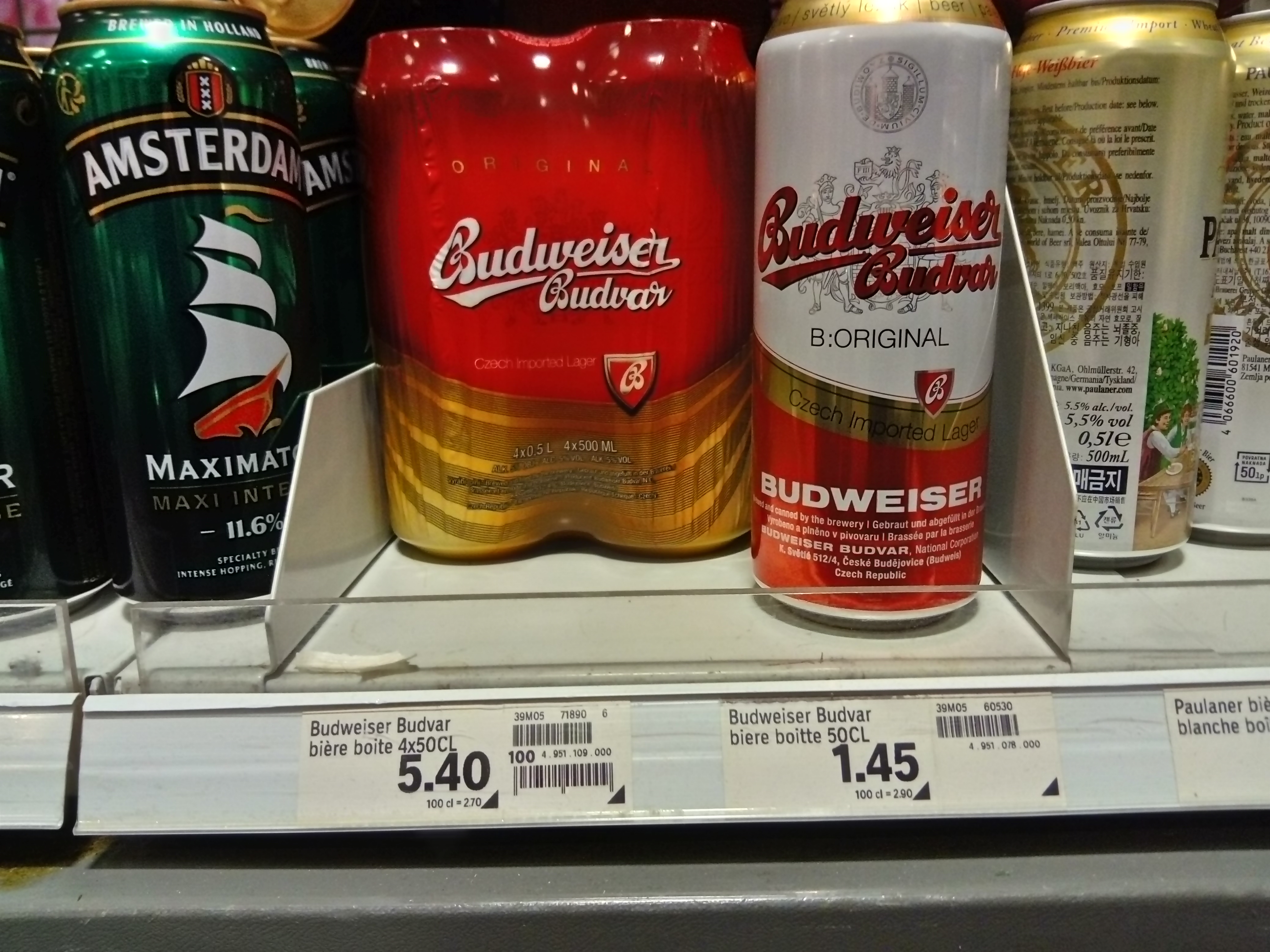
Budweiser as sold in Geneva, Switzerland in 2017

Budweiser Budvar Brewery and the American brewery Anheuser-Busch have been engaged in an ongoing trademark dispute over the name Budweiser since the start of the 20th century. In 1939, only one week before the German occupation of Czechoslovakia, Budweiser Budvar agreed to concede exclusive rights to the American brewery in the United States area. During World War II and the Cold War, Budweiser Budvar was unable to compete with then independent Anheuser-Busch. In 1994, then CEO of Budweiser Budvar, Jiří Boček, decided not to sign a trademark agreement with the American brewery to divide their territory across the world. On 29 July 2010, Anheuser-Busch lost its last-instance appeal in the European Court of Justice, meaning it may not register the name Budweiser as a European Union trademark for beer.

Consequently Budweiser Budvar beer is imported as "Czechvar" in Brazil, Canada, Mexico, Panama, Peru, Philippines and the United States and Anheuser-Busch sells its beer as "Bud" in most of the European Union.

=== Beers ===
Budweiser Budvar beer logo

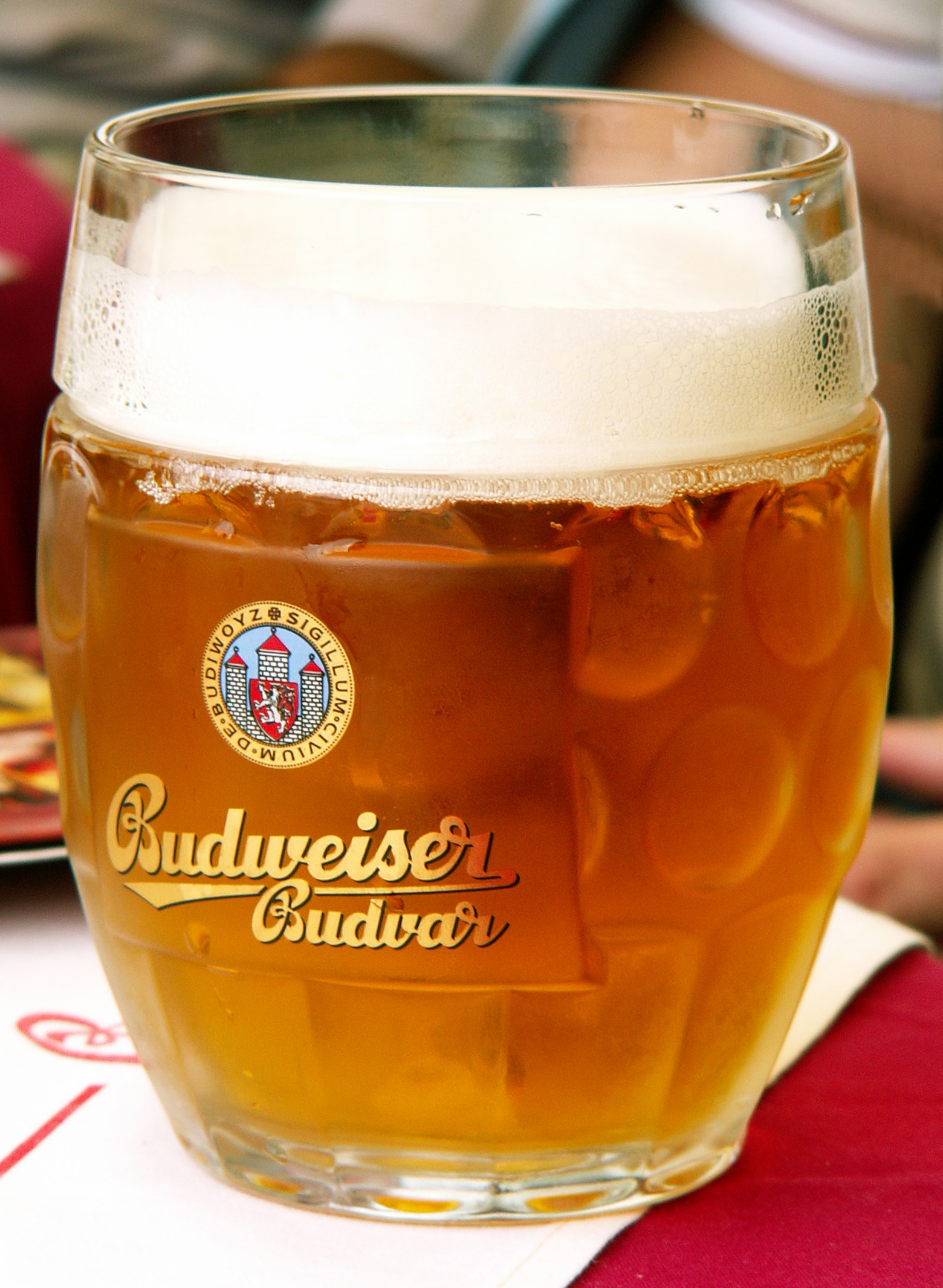
A mug of Budweiser pale lager

The company brews different types of lager:

- Classic, a pale draught beer with 4.0% ABV (in Czech: 10° or Výčepní).
- Original, 90-day matured pale lager and flagship of the brand, marketed as a premium lager, contains 5.0% ABV (in Czech: 12° or Ležák).
- Dark, a dark lager with Munich, caramel and roasted malt and 4.7% ABV (in Czech: Tmavé).
- Special, the original pale lager with added cultures of yeast (krausened lager) and 5.0% ABV (in Czech: Kroužkovaný ležák).
- Cvikl, an unfiltered yeast pale lager with 4.0% ABV (in Czech: Nefiltrované, zwickel).
- Strong, a strong pale lager matured for 200 days, contains 7.5% ABV (in Czech: 16° or Speciál).
- Free, a low-alcohol beer with 0.5% ABV (in Czech: Nealkoholické).
- Cryo, an eisbock with 21% ABV (in Czech: Mražený speciál).

Additionally, Budweiser Budvar brewery produces beer under the Pardál brand.

- Pardál, a pale draught beer with 3.8% ABV.
- Pardál Echt, a pale lager with 4.5% ABV.
- Pardál Echt kvasnicový, an unfiltered yeast beer with 4.5% ABV.
- Pardálovo Bezové, an elderberry beer with 2.0% ABV.

== List of brewmasters ==
The following is a list of Budweiser Budvar Brewery's brewmasters:

- Antonín Holeček, 1.4.1895–31.3.1899
- František Felix, 1.4.1899-31.12.1908
- Josef Brych, 1.1.1909–26.2.1919
- Vladimír Kořán, 1.3.1919-31.12.1935
- Oldřich Miškovský, 1.1.1936–30.4.1942
- Václav Rambousek, 1.5.1942–10.4.1948
- Rudolf Smolík, 1.1.1949–31.7.1959
- Miloš Heide, 1.8.1959–31.12.1984
- Josef Tolar, 1.1.1985–31.12.2008
- Adam Brož, 1.1.2009–present

== See also ==
- Beer in the Czech Republic
- Pilsner
