= Budweiser 500 =

Budweiser 500 may refer to:

- DuraMAX Drydene 400, a stock car race held at Dover International Speedway from 1984 to 1994
- Indy Japan 300, a CART race held at Twin Ring Motegi in 1998
