= Budweiser Bier Bürgerbräu =

Czech beer brewery in České Budějovice

Pivovar Samson a.s.
- Native name: Budějovický měšťanský pivovar a.s.
- Industry: Beverages
- Founded: 1795
- Headquarters: České Budějovice, Czech Republic
- Products: Beers and lagers
- Owner: Anheuser-Busch InBev
- Website: https://samson.cz/en/

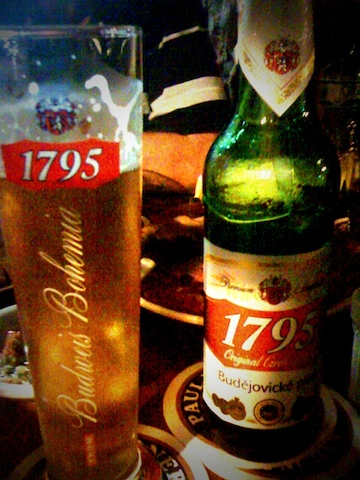
1795 Original Czech Lager (formerly 1795 B.B. Budweiser Bier)

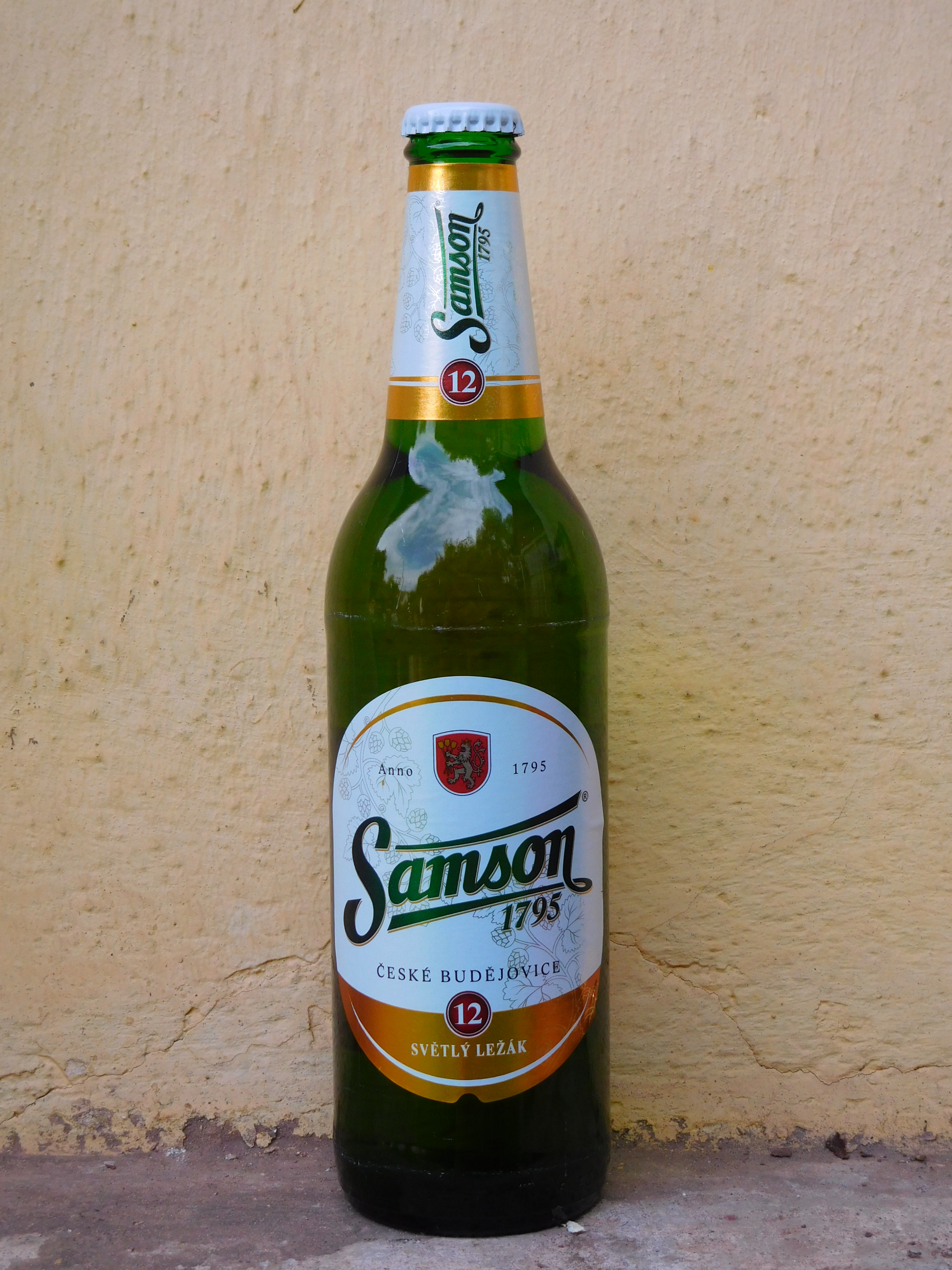
Samson 1795, 12° Pale Lager

Pivovar Samson a.s., formerly known as Bürgerliches Brauhaus Budweis is a brewery founded by mostly German-speaking burghers of the city of České Budějovice (known as Budweis in German) in the Kingdom of Bohemia, Holy Roman Empire in 1795. Its beer was known as Budweiser Bier or Budweiser Bürgerbräu since 1802 and as trademark officially since 1899. In 1894, the official company name was "Die Budweiser Bräuberechtigten - Bürgerliches Bräuhaus-Gegründet 1795 - Budweis". In 2023, the brewery has been losing tens of millions of CZK annually for about 30 years in a row.

== History ==
As early as 1875, beer from Budějovice was being exported to the United States. In 1876 Anheuser-Busch started selling beer named Budweiser inspired by the original Budweiser beer. In 1895, when Budweiser Bürgerbräu became official court supplier to the King of Württemberg, the growing Czech population founded local competition as a joint stock company, today called Budějovický Budvar. In the Budweiser trademark dispute, the three companies divided the rights to use the name, with the Europe-based companies giving up the Northern American rights to Budweiser.

Shortly before World War I Budějovický Budvar exceeded production of Bürgerliches Brauhaus. During World War II 237 out of 387 owners of Bürgerliches Brauhaus were Germans, while 150 were Czechs. In January 1945, Bürgerliches Brauhaus stopped brewing and in March 1945 the brewery was damaged during US bombing of Budějovice. After WWII most Germans were expelled and both Budějovice breweries were nationalized in 1948 by the communist government. The German-sounding names of the Bürgerbräu company and its products were renamed "Crystal" or "Samson". Accordingly in 1960 and 1989 the company was renamed "První budějovický pivovar Samson" (First Budweiser brewery Samson).

After the fall of communism, the company owned rights to "Crystal", "Czech Beer Crystal", "Biere Tcheque Crystal" and "Samson", but in 1991 reacquired national naming rights and international Protected Geographical Indication to "Budějovický měšťanský pivovar" and "Budweiser Bürgerbräu", and in 1993 to "Budějovické pivo", "Budweiser Bier", "Biere de Budweis" and "Budweis Beer".

In July 2001, the company was renamed Budějovický měšťanský pivovar a.s. (Budweiser Burghers' brewery), which corresponded with the original German name. The company used German naming like "Budweiser Bier" also in Czech and English, also stating that the hops comes from the "Czech city of Saaz", the German name for the Czech city of Žatec, known for Saaz hops.

Since 2005, due to the legal situation, the brewery offered its beer in the US as "B.B. Bürgerbräu", described as "Budweis City Bier" rather than "Budweiser beer". In 2014 Anheuser-Busch InBev bought the brewery and renamed it to Samson.

== Beers ==
- Samson 10°
- Samson 11°
- Samson 12° Pale Lager
- Samson 12° Dark Lager
- Samson 1795 Premium Lager
- Samson Bock
- Samson HefeWeizen
- Pito Budweiser Bier (alcohol free)
- Samson Dianello (diabetic beer)

== See also ==
- Budweiser Budvar Brewery (Budějovický Budvar) - another brewery in Budweis
