= Brewing right =

Privilege granted by a land owner or ruler

In the Middle Ages, the brewing right or gruit right was one of the privileges granted by the land owner or territorial ruler. Sometimes this right was linked to a plot or a house, called a "beer court"; sometimes the right was held by a hereditary judge, who might also hold the right to run a pub.

This right was first mentioned in a document when Emperor Otto II granted it to a church in Liege in 974. During the High Middle Ages, the cities often acquired this right. They tried to enforce it for some distance outside the city gates, which sometimes led to bitter disputes with the people affected.

The oldest German brewing regulations were written in Augsburg in 1155. The last remnants of the brewing monopoly were eliminated by the Beer Tax Law of 1918.

== See also ==
- Gruit
